= Cheddar =

Cheddar most often refers to:

- Cheddar cheese
- Cheddar, Somerset, the village after which Cheddar cheese is named

Cheddar may also refer to:

== Places ==
- Cheddar, Ontario, Canada
- Cheddar Yeo, a river in the village of Cheddar

== Food and service ==
- Cheddaring, a process in the manufacturing of cheddar cheese
- Cheddars, a brand of biscuit

== People ==
- Cheddar Gorgeous (born 1984), English drag performer and academic
- Rabab Cheddar (born 1991), Moroccan boxer

== Other uses ==
- Cheddar (TV channel), a live and on demand financial news network
- "Cheddar" (Brooklyn Nine-Nine), a television episode
- Slang for money

== See also ==
- Cheddar Valley (disambiguation)
- Cheddar Complex, a biological site of special scientific interest
- Cheddar Gorge, the largest gorge in the UK
- Cheddar Man, the Mesolithic remains of a human male found in Cheddar Gorge
- Cheddar Reservoir, an artificial water reservoir
- Cheddar's Scratch Kitchen, a Florida-based chain of dining restaurants
- Cheddar Wood, a site of special scientific interest
