= Bristol Reservoirs =

Reservoirs serving Bristol, England

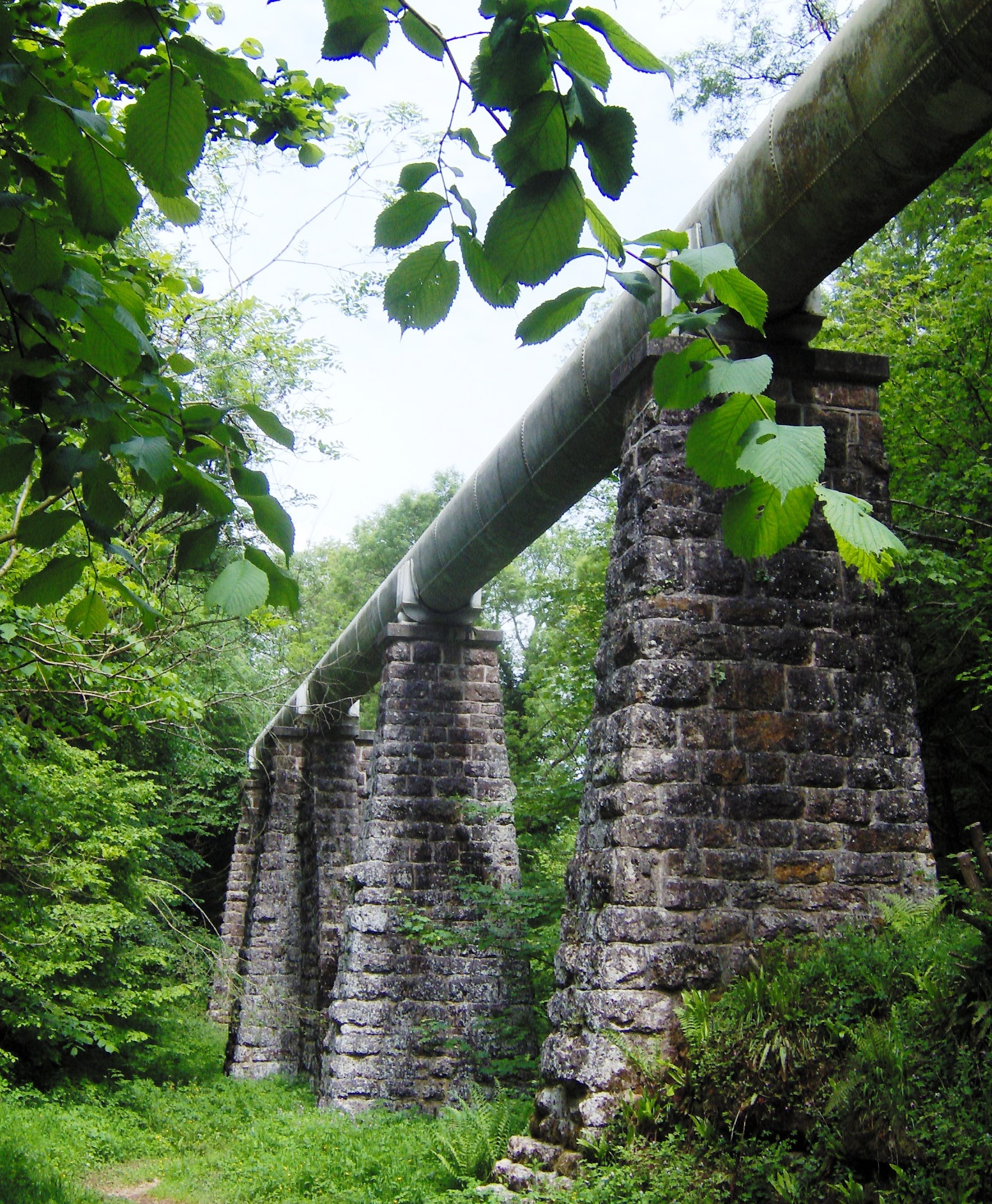
The aqueduct in Harptree Combe

The Bristol Reservoirs are six reservoirs or sets of reservoirs in the area south of Bristol. All six are operated by Bristol Water.

They are (in decreasing order of size):

- Chew Valley Lake
- Blagdon Lake
- Cheddar Reservoir
- Barrow Gurney Reservoirs
- Litton Reservoirs
- Chew Magna Reservoir

Between 1846 and 1853 Bristol Water created a series of tunnels, pipes and aqueducts called the "Line of Works" which still carry approximately 4 million imperial gallons (18,000 m^{3}) of water a day from the Mendip Hills to Barrow Gurney Reservoirs for filtration and then onto Bristol and the surrounding areas. All this is done by gravity as it collects and conveys water from the Chewton Mendip and East and West Harptree areas.
