= St Mary's Church, Litton =

Church in Somerset, England

Church of St Mary
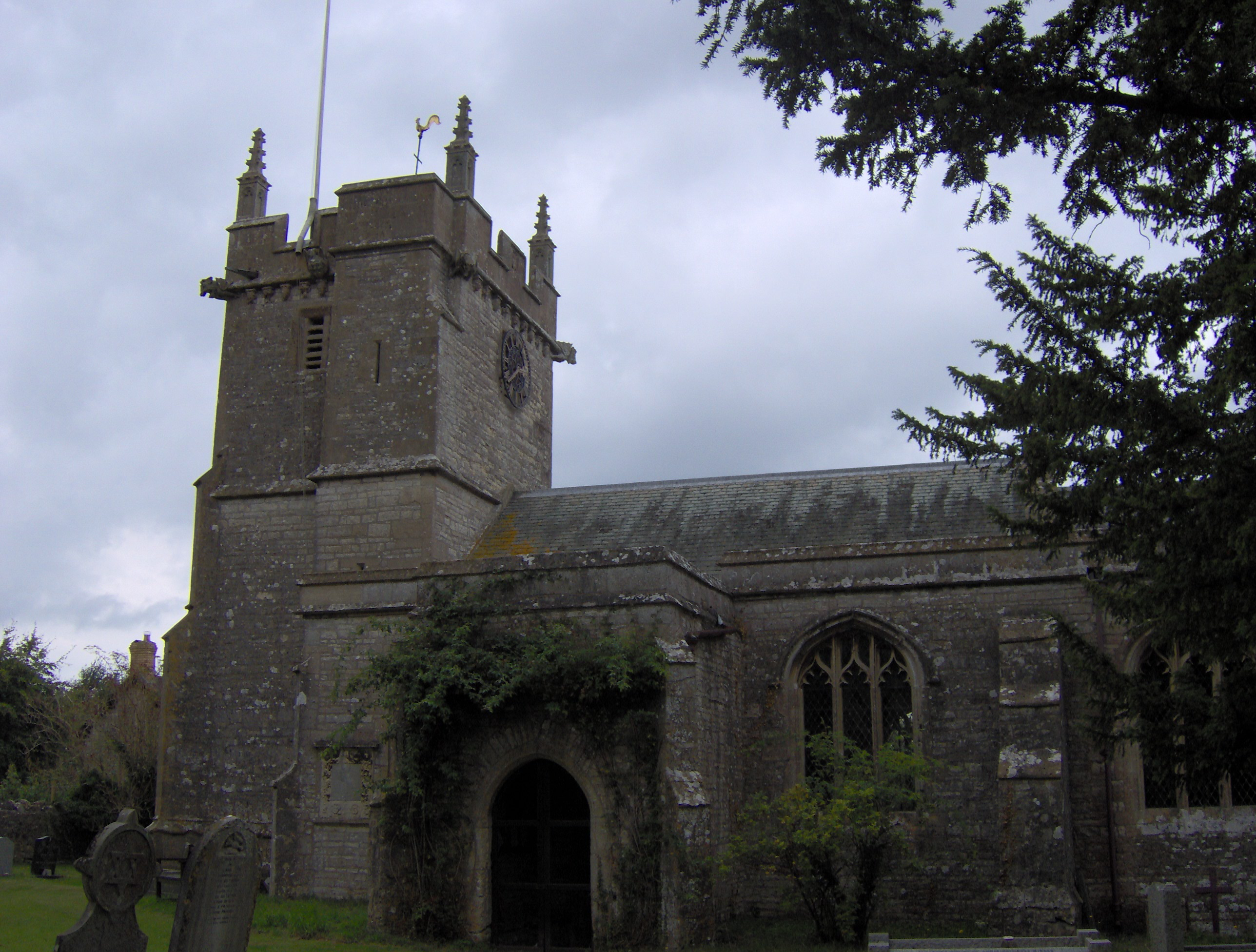

- Location within Somerset

General information
- Location: Litton, Somerset, England
- Coordinates: 51.2899°N 2.5830°W
- Completed: 13th century

The Church of St Mary in Litton, Somerset, England, dates from the 13th century. It is a Grade I listed building.

There is some evidence for the existence of a Saxon church on the site before the Norman Conquest. The village was listed in the Domesday Book of 1086 as Litune, meaning 'The small enclosure' from the Old English lyt and tun. It was the property of Gisa, Bishop of Wells, and a Norman building was later incorporated into the present building.

The north isle was added around 1850 to accommodate the influx of people involved in the construction of the Litton Reservoirs. It contains the 14th century font. The pulpit is Jacobean and the benches are from the 15th century.

It has a Perpendicular three-stage tower with battlements, pinnacles and a bell chamber, containing six bells which were repaired and rehung around 1910.

Several of the memorials and crosses in the churchyard are also listed buildings. There is also a damaged Saxon font.

== See also ==
- List of Grade I listed buildings in Mendip
- List of towers in Somerset
- List of ecclesiastical parishes in the Diocese of Bath and Wells
