= Harptree =

Harptree could refer to

- East Harptree or West Harptree, two villages in Somerset, England
- Harptree Combe, a wooded valley nearby
- Baron Dean of Harptree, a British peer
- Harptree, Saskatchewan
