= List of statutory instruments of the United Kingdom, 1958 =

This is an incomplete list of statutory instruments of the United Kingdom in 1958.

== Statutory instruments ==
=== 1-499 ===
- Electricity (Consultative Council) (Areas) Order 1958 (SI 1958/1)
- Small Ground Vermin Traps Order 1958 (SI 1958/24)
- Exeter (Water Charges) Order 1958 (SI 1958/43)
- Tees Valley and Cleveland Water Order 1958 (SI 1958/44)
- Work in Compressed Air Special Regulations 1958 (SI 1958/61)
- Explosives (Fees for Importation) Order 1958 (SI 1958/136)
- Reciprocal Enforcement of Judgments (Pakistan) Order 1958 (SI 1958/141)
- Guildford Godalming and District Water Board Order 1958 (SI 1958/163)
- Guildford Godalming and District Water Board (No. 2) Order 1958 (SI 1958/165)
- Fulwood (Water Charges) Order 1958 (SI 1958/218)
- Conveyance of Explosives Byelaws 1958 (SI 1958/230)
- Ripon Water Order 1958 (SI 1958/252)
- Thanet Water Board (Charges) Order 1958 (SI 1958/264)
- Dragonby Ironstone Mine (Diesel, Diesel-Electric and Storage Battery Vehicles) Special Regulations 1958 (SI 1958/320)
- Winn's Ironstone Mine (Diesel, Diesel-Electric and Storage Battery Vehicles) Special Regulations 1958 (SI 1958/321)
- Superannuation (Fire Brigade and other Local Government Service) Interchange (Amendment) Rules 1958 (SI 1958/361)
- Agriculture (Avoidance of Accidents to Children) Regulations 1958 (SI 1958/366)
- Reciprocal Enforcement of Judgments (India) Order 1958 (SI 1958/425)
- North Devon Water Board (SI 1958/434)
- North Cumberland Water Board Order 1958 (SI 1958/442)
- Irwell Valley Water Board Order 1958 (SI 1958/470)
- Dark Smoke (Permitted Periods) Regulations 1958 (SI 1958/498)
- Special Constables (Pensions) (Scotland) Order 1958 (SI 1958/499)

=== 500-999 ===
- Stopping up of Highways (Norfolk) Order 1958 (SI 1958/500)
- Grantham Waterworks Order 1958 (SI 1958/501)
- Oxford Water Order 1958 (SI 1958/531)
- Watford (Water Charges) Order 1958 (SI 1958/518)
- Bristol Waterworks (Axbridge) Order 1958 (SI 1958/553)
- Coventry Water Order 1958 (SI 1958/554)
- Imported Livestock Order 1958 (SI 1958/558)
- Grimsby Cleethorpes and District Water Board (Weelsby Pumping Station) Order 1958 (SI 1958/587)
- National Insurance and Industrial Injuries (France) Order 1958 (SI 1958/597)
- Central Banks (Income Tax Schedule C Exemption) Order 1958 (SI 1958/598)
- Fire Services (Pensionable Employment) Regulations 1958 (SI 1958/640)
- Newcastle and Gateshead Water Order 1958 (SI 1958/724)
- Family Allowances, National Insurance and Industrial Injuries (Belgium) Order 1958 (SI 1958/771)
- Kent Joint Advisory Water Committee Order 1958 (SI 1958/872)
- Dark Smoke (Permitted Periods) (Vessels) Regulations 1958 (SI 1958/878)
- Petroleum-Spirit (Conveyance by Road) Regulations 1958 (SI 1958/962)
- Stopping up of Highways (London) Order 1958 (SI 1958/999)

=== 1000-1499 ===
- Stopping up of Highways (York, West Riding) Order 1958 (SI 1958/1000)
- Copyright (International Organisations) (Amendment) Order 1958 (SI 1958/1052)
- Meters (Permitted Alterations) Order 1958 (SI 1958/1061)
- Folkstone (Water Charges) Order 1958 (SI 1958/1086)
- Government Annuities Payment Regulations 1958 (SI 1958/1181)
- Guildford Godalming and District Water Board (No. 3) Order 1958 (SI 1958/1214)
- Mid-Northamptonshire Water Board Order 1958 (SI 1958/1215)
- National Insurance (New Entrants Transitional) Amendment Regulations 1958 (SI 1958/1239)
- Visiting Forces (Designation) (Malta) Order 1958 (SI 1958/1261)
- Visiting Forces (Designation) (Colonies) (Amendment) Order 1958 (SI 1958/1262)
- Family Allowances, National Insurance and Industrial Injuries (Yugoslavia) Order 1958 (SI 1958/1263)
- Central Banks (Income Tax Schedule C Exemption) (No. 2) Order 1958 (SI 1958/1265)
- Silverwood Mine (Electric Trolley Locomotives) Special Regulations 1958 (SI 1958/1276)
- Chequers Estate (Appointed Day) Order 1958 (SI 1958/1352)
- Sheffield Water Order 1958 (SI 1958/1383)
- Southend Water Order 1958 (SI 1958/1390)
- Higham Ferrers and Rushden Water Board (Ditchford Works) Order 1958 (SI 1958/1428)
- Brighton (Lewes) Water Order 1958 (SI 1958/1482)
- Stopping up of Highways (County of Buckingham) Order 1958 (SI 1958/1499)

=== 1500-1999 ===
- Stopping up of Highways (County of Southampton) Order 1958 (SI 1958/1500)
- North Borneo (Definition of Boundaries) Order in Council 1958 (SI 1958/1517)
- Sarawak (Definition of Boundaries) Order in Council 1958 (SI 1958/1518)
- Cinematograph (Safety) Regulations 1958 (SI 1958/1530)
- Abertillery and District Water Board Order 1958 (SI 1958/1563)
- West Dorset Water Board Order 1958 (SI 1958/1607)
- Bolton Water Order 1958 (SI 1958/1615)
- Mid and South East Cheshire Water Board Order 1958 (SI 1958/1616)
- Durham County (Water Charges) Order 1958 (SI 1958/1620)
- Opencast Coal (Notice of Work) Regulations 1958 (SI 1958/1649)
- Staffordshire Potteries Water Board Order 1958 (SI 1958/1676)
- General Claims Tribunal (Transfer Date) Order 1958 (SI 1958/1752)
- Claro Water Board Order 1958 (SI 1958/1808)
- Cardiff Corporation Water (Llandegfedd Reservoir) Order 1958 (SI 1958/1851)
- Act of Sederunt (Legal Aid Rules) 1958 (SI 1958/1872)
- Trowbridge, Melksham and District Water Board Order 1958 (SI 1958/1913)
- Singapore (Constitution) Order in Council 1958 (SI 1958/1946)
- Import Duty Reliefs (Administration) Order 1958 (SI 1958/1965)
- Foreign Compensation Commission (Amendment) Rules, Approval Instrument 1958 (SI 1958/1995)

=== 2000-2280 ===
- London Traffic (Prescribed Routes) (Harrow) Order 1958 (SI 1958/2001)
- Metropolitan Water Board Order 1958 (SI 1958/2033)
- Whaling Industry (Ship) (Amendment) Regulations 1958 (SI 1958/2042)
- South-East Breconshire Water Board Order 1958 (SI 1958/2046)
- East Surrey Water Order 1958 (SI 1958/2060)
- Matrimonial Causes (Property and Maintenance) Act (Commencement) Order 1958 (SI 1958/2080)
- Maintenance Orders Act 1958 (Commencement) Order 1958 (SI 1958/2111)
- Opencast Coal (Notice of Record) Regulations 1958 (SI 1958/2121)
- National Insurance (New Entrants Transitional) Amendment (No. 2) Regulations 1958 (SI 1958/2124)
- British Wool Marketing Scheme (Amendment) Order 1958 (SI 1958/2125)
- British Wool Marketing Scheme (Directions) Order 1958 (SI 1958/2126)
- Superannuation (English Local Government and Northern Ireland) Interchange (Amendment) Rules 1958 (SI 1958/2136)
- Coast Protection (Variation of Excluded Waters) Regulations 1958 (SI 1958/2146)
- Slaughter of Animals (Prevention of Cruelty) Regulations 1958 (SI 1958/2166)
- Pensions Commutation Payment Regulations 1958 (SI 1958/2195)
- Land Powers (Defence) Act (Inquiries) Rules 1958 (SI 1958/2231)
- Bristol Waterworks (Shepton Mallet) Order 1958 (SI 1958/2263)
- Newark Corporation Water Order 1958 (SI 1958/2280)

== See also ==
- List of statutory instruments of the United Kingdom
