= Cheddar Yeo =

River in Somerset, England

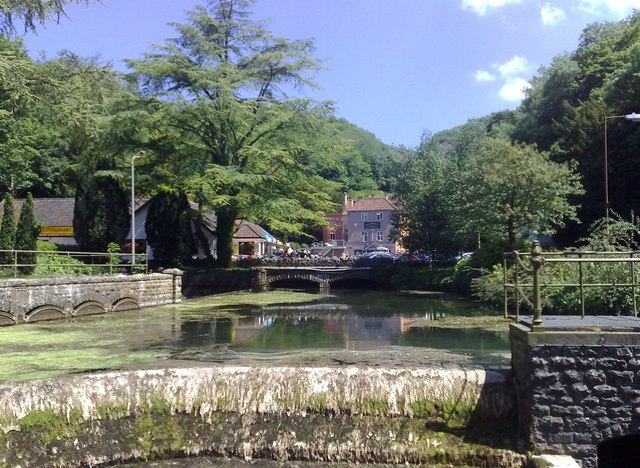
- The dam at the bottom of Cheddar Gorge

Location
- Country: England
- District: Somerset

Physical characteristics
- Source
  - location: Cheddar, Somerset, England
  - coordinates: 51°16′54.45″N 2°45′58.93″W
- Mouth: River Axe
  - location: Near Rackley, Somerset, Somerset, England
  - coordinates: 51°17′22.96″N 2°53′30.37″W

The Cheddar Yeo is a small river in Somerset, England. Beneath the limestone of the Mendip Hills it forms the largest underground river system in Britain. After emerging into Cheddar Gorge it flows through the village of Cheddar, where it has been used in the past to power mills. From the Middle Ages until the 19th century the river had ports for seagoing vessels but is no longer navigable. Some of the water, which is of good quality, is diverted into Cheddar Reservoir to provide drinking water for Bristol.

== Course ==
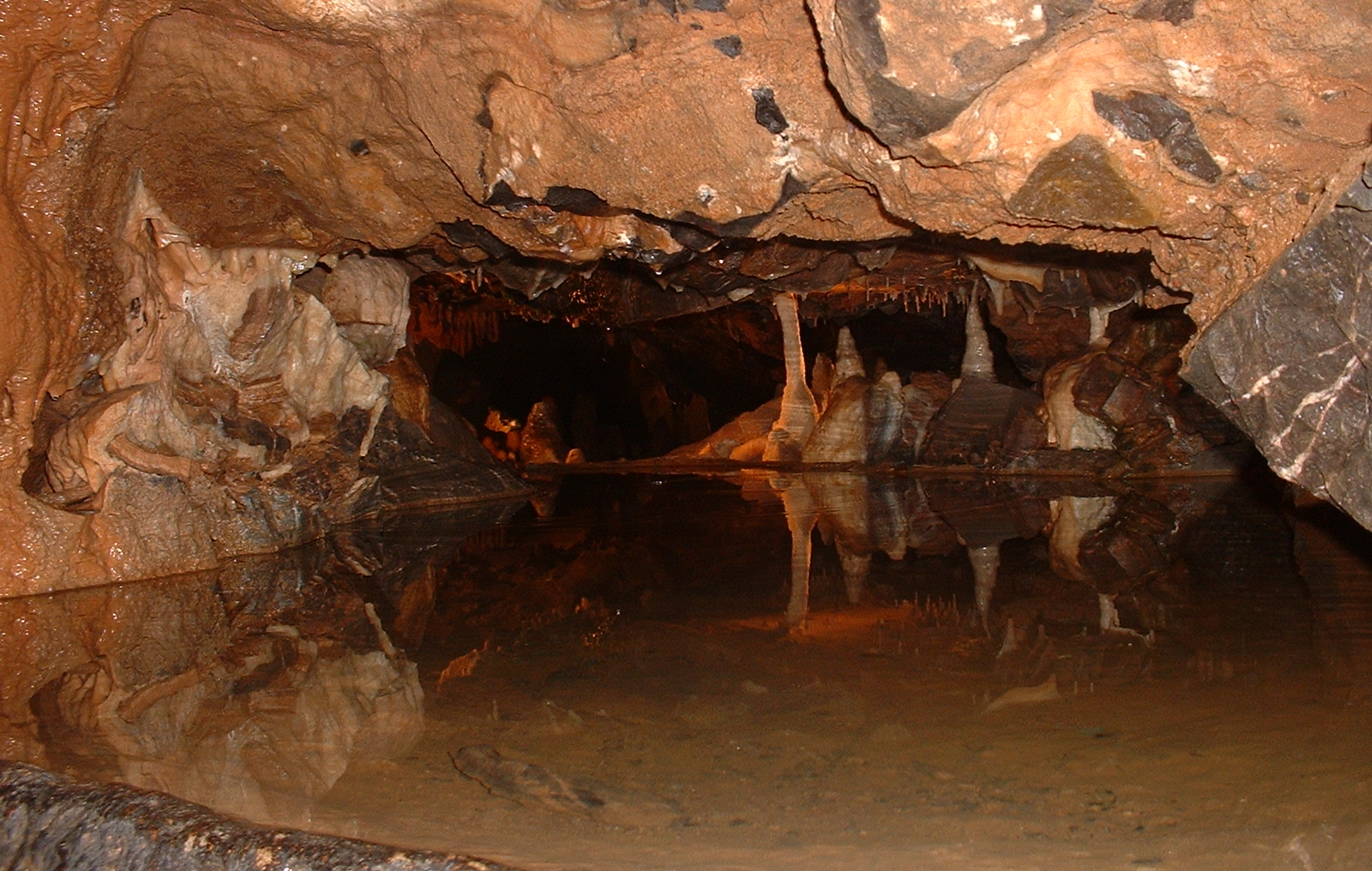
Inside Gough's Cave

The Yeo rises from a spring near Charterhouse, then disappears under the limestone of the Mendip Hills, reappearing in Gough's Cave, before emerging into Cheddar Gorge. Within Gough's Cave the river forms the largest underground river system in Britain. From a point relatively close to the areas of the cave open to the public, the cave-divers' descent into Sump 1a begins through a tight passage known as Dire Straits. The bottom of that passage opens into the river passage, which is several meters across. This has been explored for 335 m (1,099 ft) downstream, whilst upstream a dive of 150 m (490 ft) brings the diver out in a 20 m (66 ft) long chamber named Lloyd Hall (which can now also be reached by an alternative, dry, route). Another dive of 140 m (460 ft) through Sump 1b, finishing with an ascent through a rising passage, leads to another chamber, 60 metres (197 ft) long and 25 metres (82 ft) wide at its widest point, and full of large boulders, called Bishop's Palace. This chamber is the largest chamber currently found in the Cheddar caves. Further on, three sump pools (named the Duck Ponds) lead to Sump 2 which is about 27 metres (89 ft) deep at its lowest point and 150 metres (492 ft) long. Air is again reached at Sheppard's Crook, which is followed by Sump 3. This sump is 55 metres (180 ft) deep and at its bottommost point is about 30 metres (98 ft) below sea level. Following Sump 3, a wide ascending passage continues for 370 metres (1,214 ft) before reaching an impassable blockage, still below the water's surface.

After emerging from the cave the river flows through Cheddar past the site of a Saxon palace, in the grounds of The Kings of Wessex School, together with a 14th-century chapel dedicated to St. Columbanus. Roman remains have also been uncovered at the site.

It then flows south under a disused railway bridge which used to carry the Cheddar Valley line and west through Rackley before joining the River Axe.

The catchment area is 54 square kilometres (21 sq mi).

== History ==
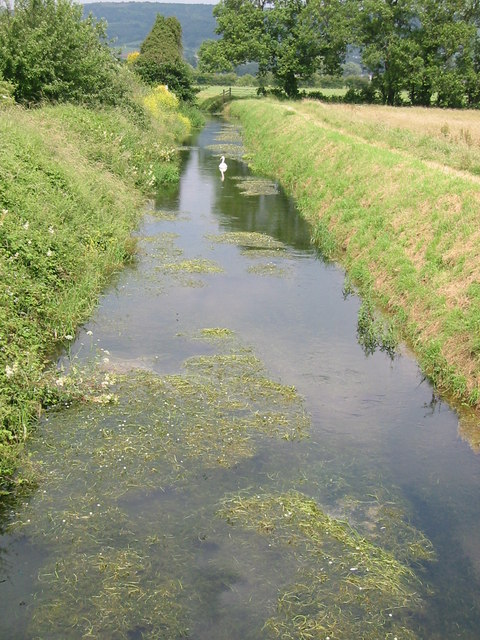
The Cheddar Yeo at Hythe

As early as 1527 there are records of watermills on the river. In the 17th and 18th centuries, there were several watermills which ground corn and made paper, with 13 mills on the Yeo at the peak, declining to seven by 1791 and just three by 1915. In the Victorian era it also became a centre for the production of clothing. The last mill in Cheddar, which was used as a shirt factory, closed in the early 1950s.

Rackley was a trading port in the Middle Ages following construction of a wharf in 1200. In 1324 Edward II confirmed it as a borough, however by the end of the 14th century the port was in decline. In the 14th century a French ship sailed up the river and by 1388 Thomas Tanner from Wells used Rackley to export cloth and corn to Portugal, and received iron and salt in exchange. Later slate was imported through this route and it may have still been possible to trade through Rackley until the act of 1915 authorising the drainage of the Axe and installation of the flood gate at Bleadon.

There was also a small port at Hythe on the Wedmore Road, just south of Cheddar, which was used until the 19th century.

== Reservoir ==
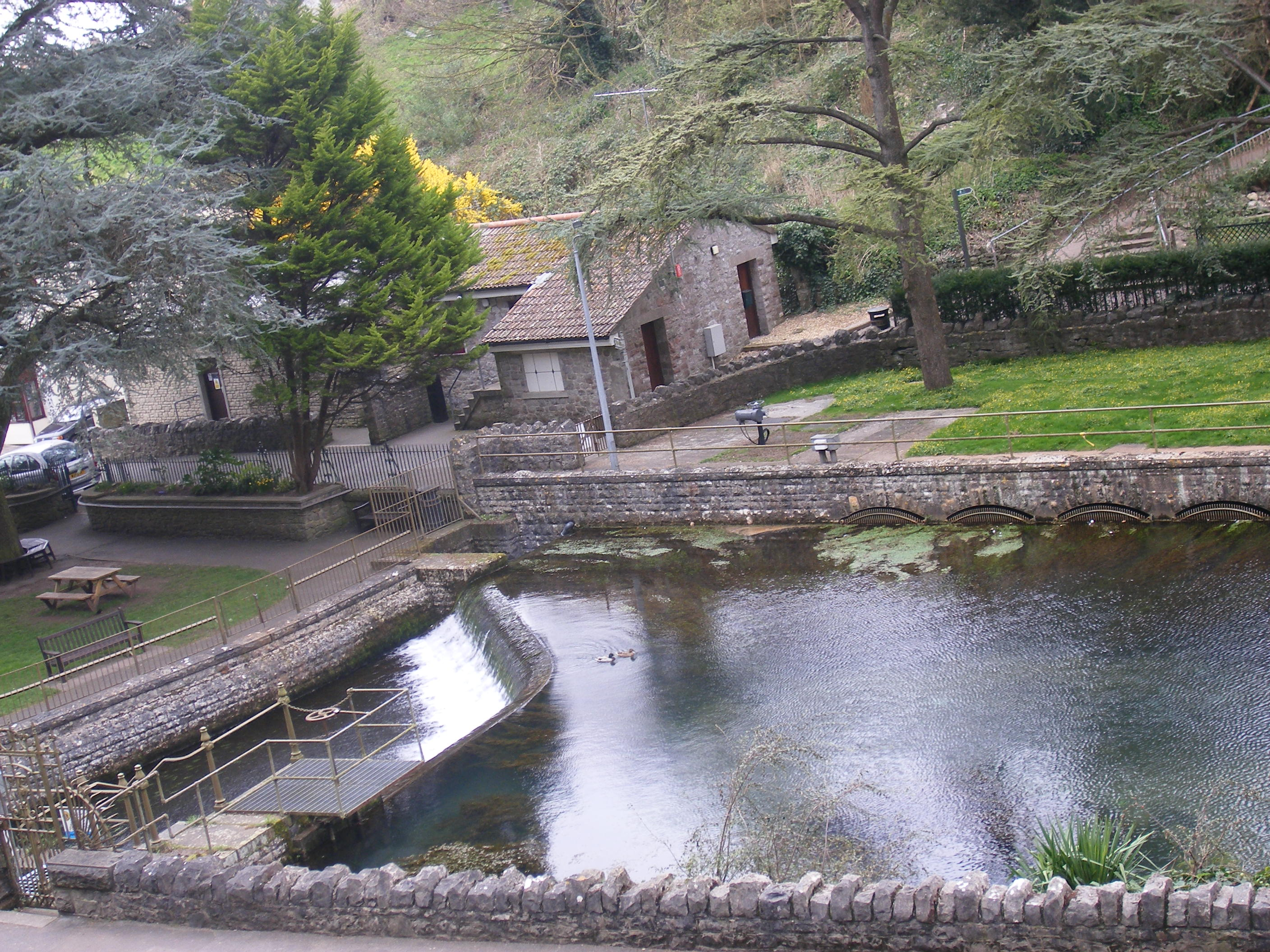
The arches which can be seen in the centre are the start of the pipe transporting water to the reservoir.

Water from the river also flows into Cheddar Reservoir which is a circular artificial reservoir operated by Bristol Water. The inlet grate for the 54 inches (1.4 m) water pipe that is used to transport the water can be seen next to the sensory garden in Cheddar Gorge. Dating from the 1930s, the reservoir has a capacity of 135 million imperial gallons (610,000 m^{3}). It has been designated as a Site of Special Scientific Interest (SSSI) due to its wintering waterfowl populations.

In 2007 it announced that the new reservoir close to the existing site would be one of the options considered in its Draft 2009 Water Resources Plan. The new reservoir would hold 6,000 million litres, roughly the same size as the existing reservoir, and built on the alluvial flood plain the Cheddar Yeo.

== Water quality ==
The Environment Agency have rated the Cheddar Yeo as having moderate water ecological quality, but failed the chemical assessment in 2016.

== Gallery ==
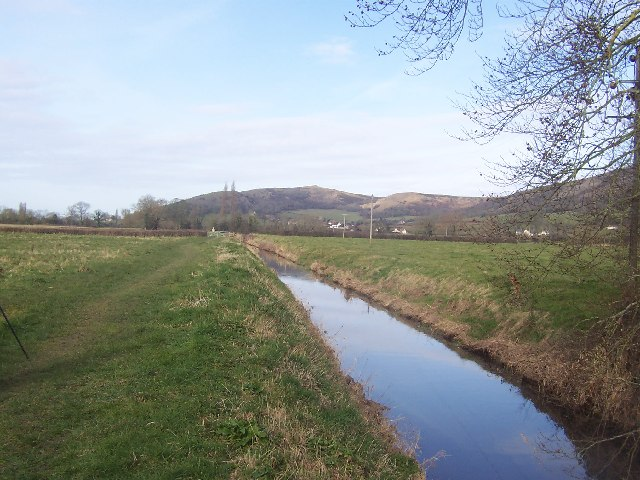

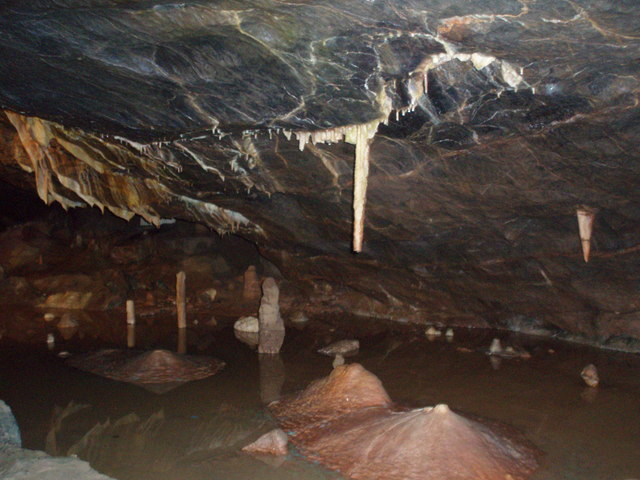

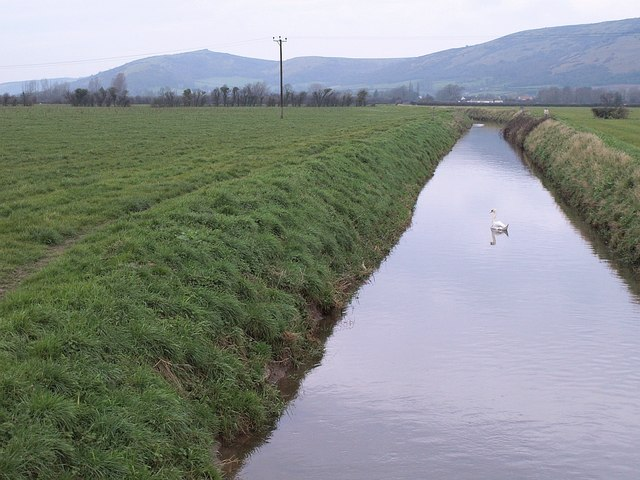

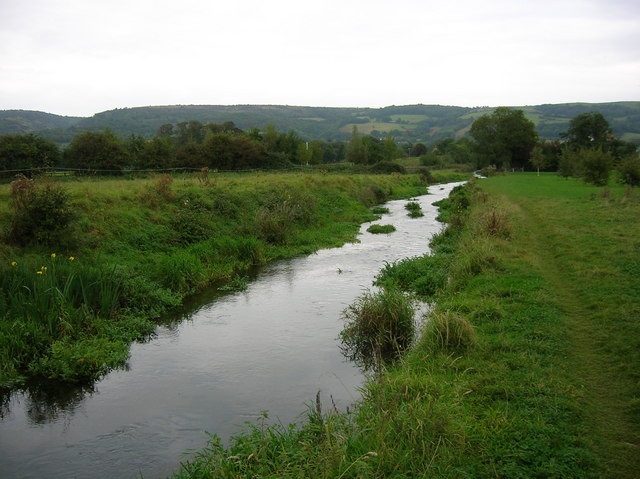

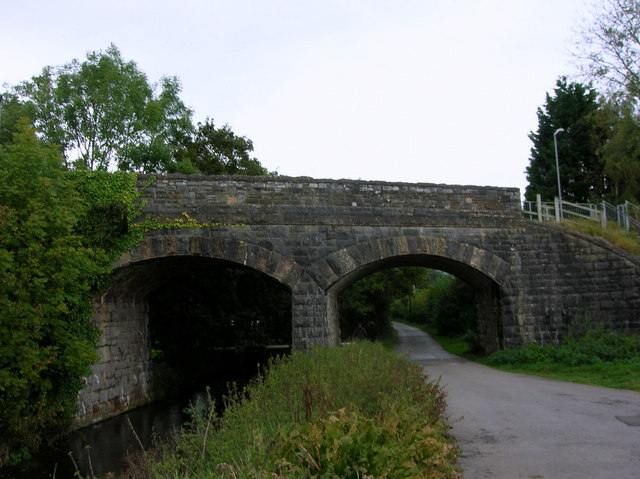

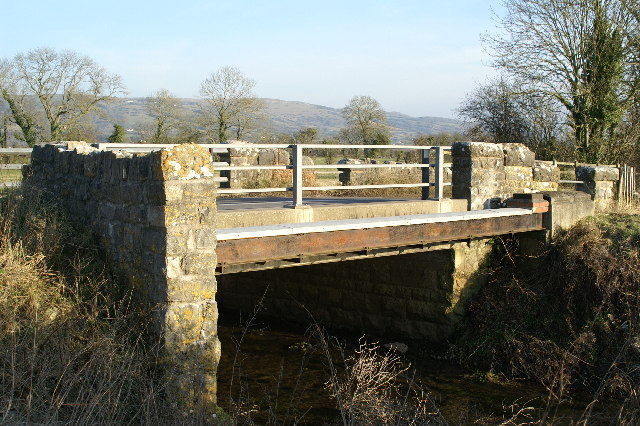
