= Cheddar Gorge =

Valley in Somerset, England

Coordinates: 51°16′57″N 2°45′56″W

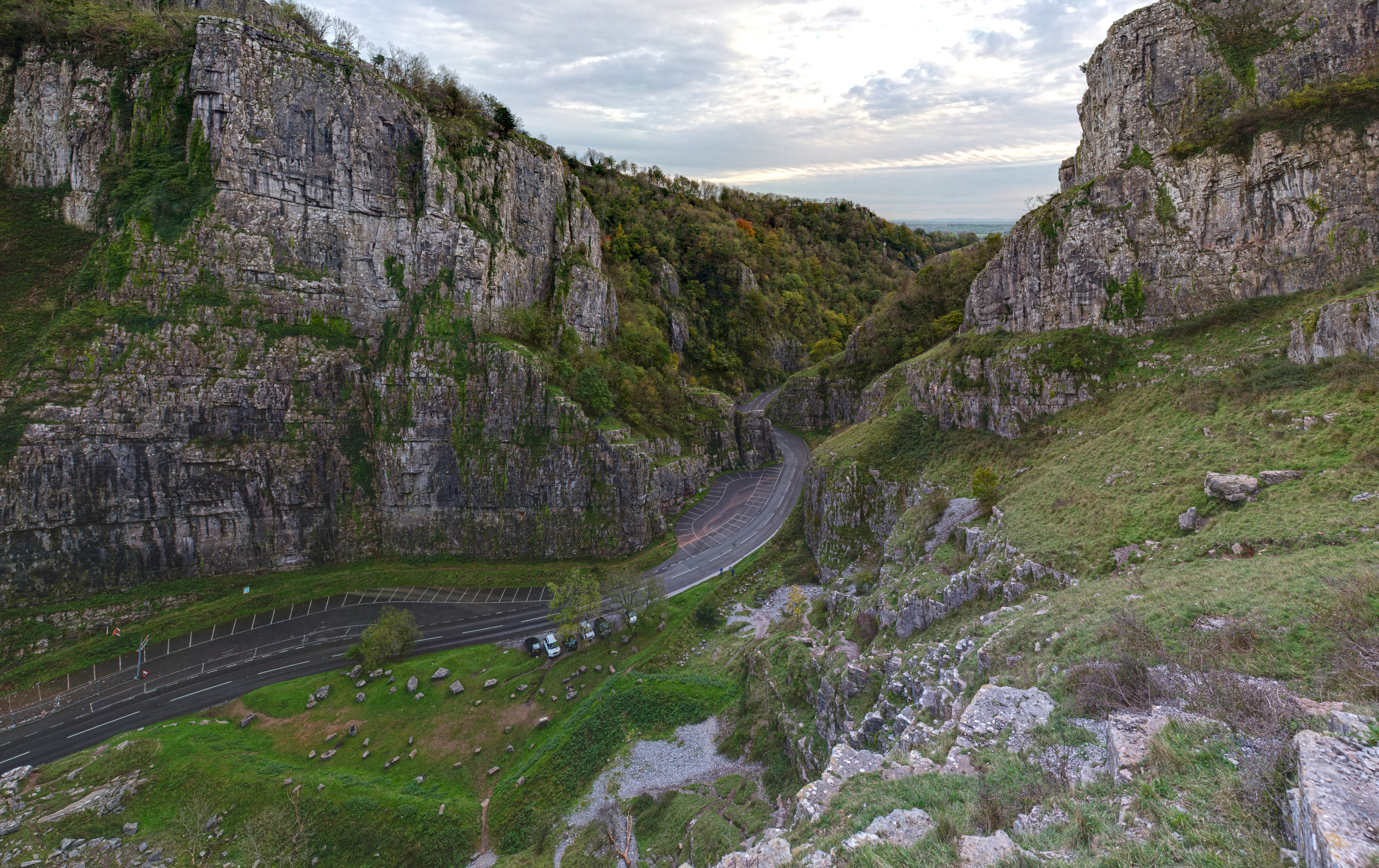
Cheddar Gorge in 2013

Location in the United Kingdom

Cheddar Gorge is a limestone gorge in the Mendip Hills, near the village of Cheddar, Somerset, England. The gorge is the site of the Cheddar show caves, where Great Britain's oldest complete human skeleton, Cheddar Man, estimated to be 9,000 years old, was found in 1903. Older remains from the Upper Late Palaeolithic era (12,000–13,000 years ago) have been found. The caves, produced by the activity of an underground river, contain stalactites and stalagmites. The gorge is part of a Site of Special Scientific Interest called Cheddar Complex.

Cheddar Gorge, including the caves and other attractions, has become a tourist destination. In a 2005 poll of Radio Times readers, following its appearance on the television programme Seven Natural Wonders (2005), Cheddar Gorge was named as the second-greatest natural wonder in Great Britain, surpassed only by Dan yr Ogof caves. The gorge attracts about 500,000 visitors per year.

== Geology ==
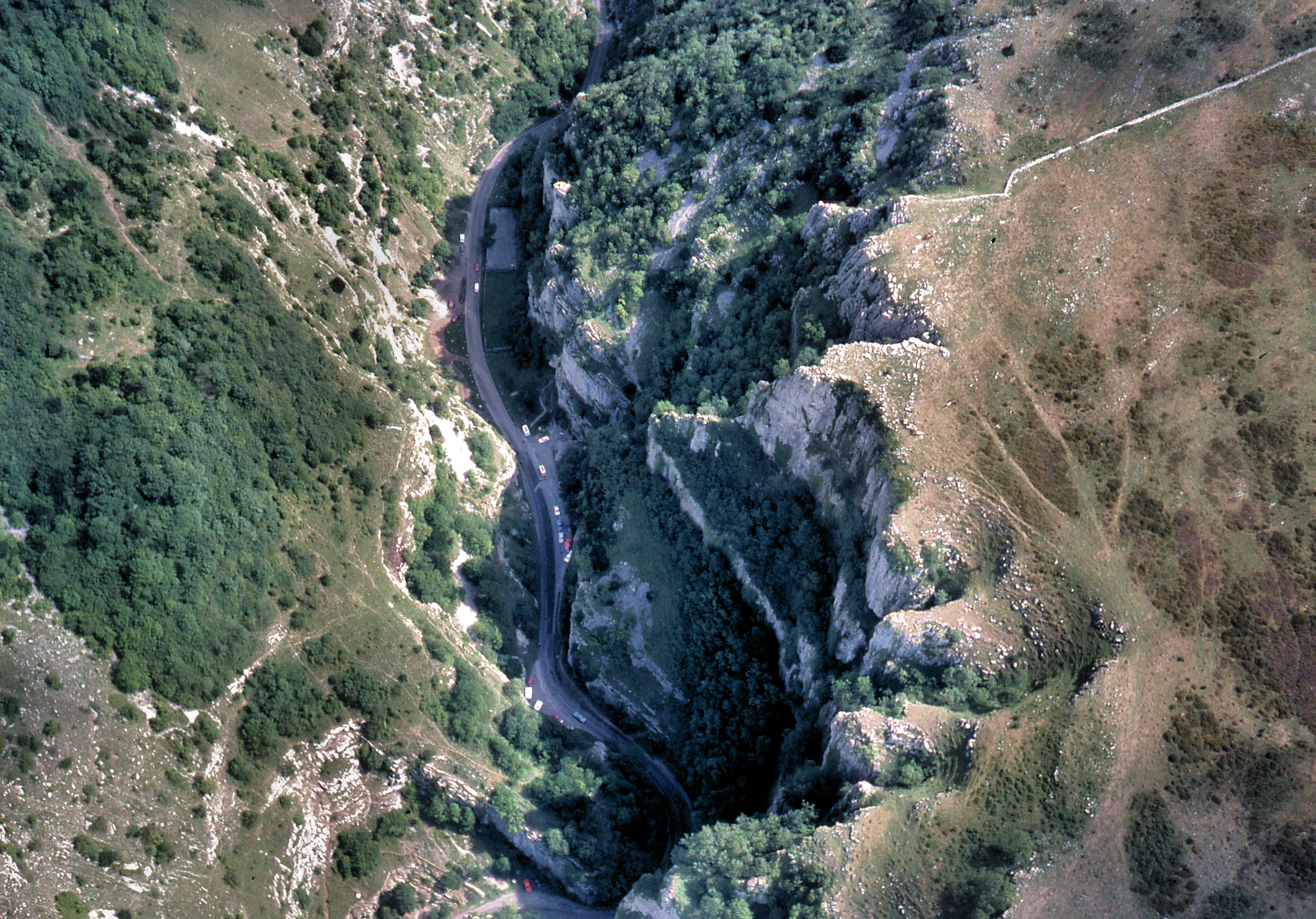
Aerial photograph, showing the cliff faces to the south (right hand side of picture) and the slopes to the north

Cheddar Gorge is on the southern edge of the Mendip Hills, with a maximum depth of 137 m (449 ft). The area is underlain by Black Rock slate, Burrington Oolite and Clifton Down Limestone of the Carboniferous Limestone Series, which contain ooliths and fossil debris, on top of Old Red Sandstone and by dolomitic conglomerate of the Keuper. Evidence for Variscan orogeny is seen in the sheared rock, cleaved shales and anticlinal fold of the Mendip hills. In many places weathering of these strata has resulted in the formation of immature calcareous soils.

The gorge was formed during the Permo-Triassic period about 260 million years ago.. At that time Britain had a warm arid climate, not dissimilar to northern Africa today. Occasionally flash floods cause huge volumes of water to run off the hills, forming wadis — an Arabic term for the steep-sided ravines characteristic of intermittent streams. Cheddar Gorge and its near neighbour, Burrington Combe, are exhumed wadis. They were filled with Triassic rocks that were eroded and 'exhumed' by glacial meltwaters at the end of the last Ice Age. Parts of Burrington Combe still have these Triassic rocks, forming an unconformity with the Carboniferous limestones along their sides and bottom.

At the end of the last Ice Age permafrost blocked the caves with ice and frozen mud, making the limestone impermeable. When the surface permafrost melted during the summers, water flowed on the surface, carving out the softer Triassic rocks, exhuming the wadi. During warmer periods the water flowed underground through the permeable limestone, creating the caves and leaving the gorge dry, so that today much of the gorge has no river until the underground Cheddar Yeo river emerges in the lower part from Gough's Cave. The river is used by Bristol Water, which maintains a series of dams and ponds supplying the nearby Cheddar Reservoir via a 137-centimetre (54 in) diameter pipe that takes water just upstream of the Rotary Club Sensory Garden, a public park in the Gorge opposite Jacob's Ladder.

The gorge is susceptible to flooding. In the Chew Stoke flood of 1968 the flow of water washed large boulders down the gorge, damaging the café and the entrance to Gough's Cave and washing away cars. In the cave itself the flooding lasted for three days. In 2012 the B3135 road through Cheddar Gorge was closed for several weeks following damage to the road surface as a result of extensive flooding.

== Ownership ==
The south side of the gorge is owned and administered by the Marquess of Bath's Longleat Estate. The cliffs on the north side of the gorge are owned by The National Trust. Every year both of the gorge's owners contribute funds towards the clearance of scrub, bushes and trees from the area.

Most of the commercial visitor activity in the gorge is on the Longleat-owned south side, including access to the two main commercial show caves and the visitor centre, which is operated by Longleat-owned company Cheddar Gorge and Caves Ltd. Because the number of visitors to the show caves fell from 400,000 a year in the 1980s to 150,000 in 2013, Ceawlin Thynn, Viscount Weymouth, who runs the Longleat estate on behalf of the family trust, proposed the installation of a 600-metre (2,000 ft) 18-gondola cable car at an estimated cost of £10m, which would take visitors from the entrance area to the caves direct to the top of the southside cliffs. The National Trust opposed the proposed development, stating that it would spoil the view and cheapen the experience, creating a "fairground ride" that would make the area feel more like an amusement park. Planning permission was planned in Spring 2014, which would have meant that operations would start in Spring 2016. In 2015 the financial feasibility was still being investigated.

== Ecology ==
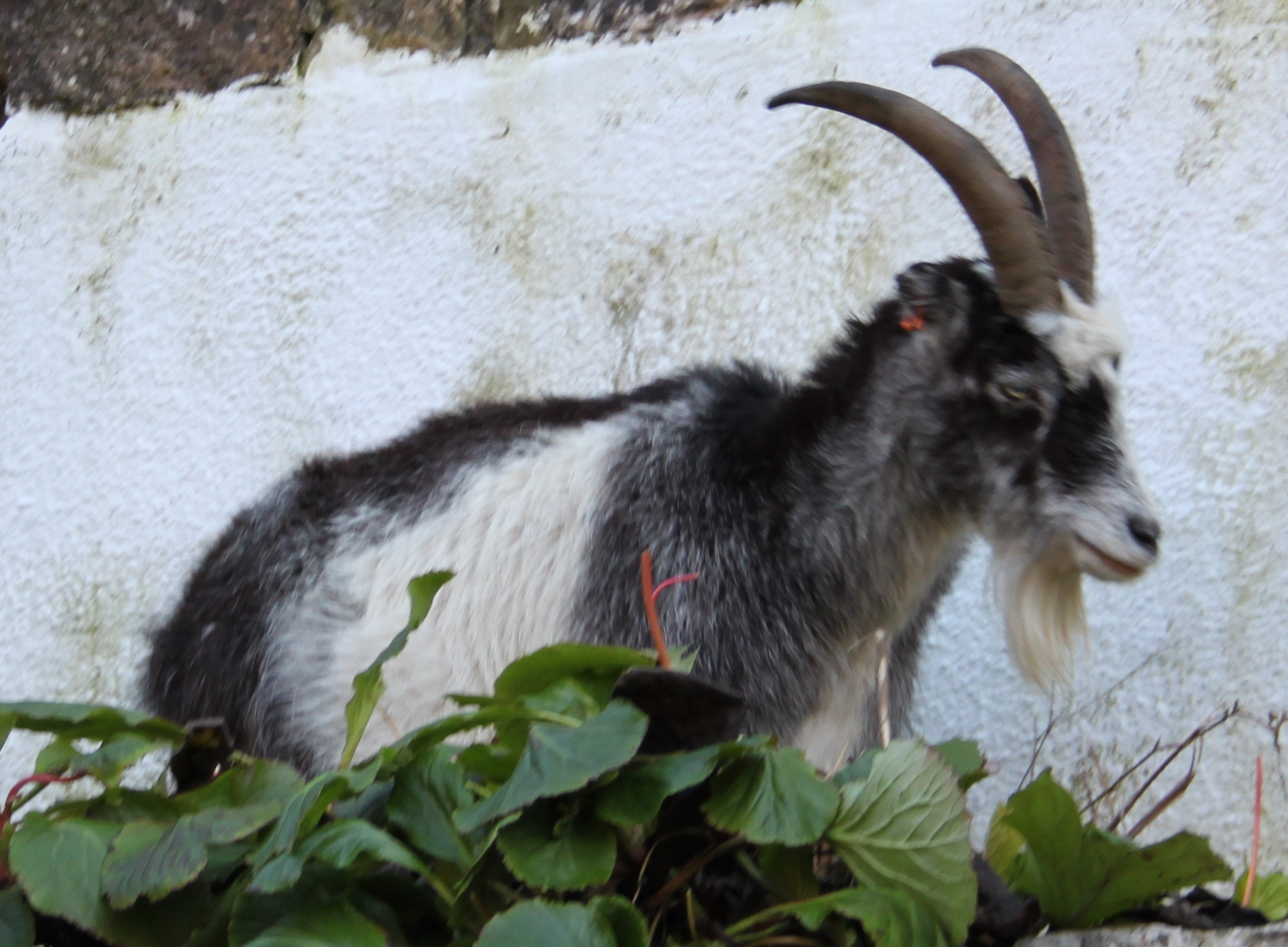
A goat in the gorge

Notable species at the gorge include dormice, yellow-necked mice, slowworms and adders and the rare large blue butterfly (Maculinea arion), and small pearl-bordered fritillary (Boloria selene).

Birds that may be seen in Cheddar Gorge include peregrine falcon, buzzard, kestrel, raven and grasshopper warbler.

The flora include chalk grassland-loving species such as marjoram and wild thyme. The Cheddar pink, Dianthus gratianopolitanus, also known as firewitch, grows in the wild only in the gorge. It was once common in the gorge but declined after being picked by collectors. It is also home to unique species of whitebeam. The nationally rare little robin geranium (Geranium purpureum), Cheddar bedstraw (Galium fleurotii) and the nationally scarce species slender tare (Vicia tenuissima), dwarf mouse-ear (Cerastium pumilum) and rock stonecrop (Sedum forsteranum) also occur in the gorge. It is one of the few localities in England with native populations of the Welsh poppy Papaver cambricum. It is one of the very few areas in southern Britain where the lichens Solorina saccata, Squamaria cartilaginea and Caloplaca cirrochroa can be found.

The gorge is also an important site for whitebeams and in 2009 a survey was carried out by botanists from the Welsh National Herbarium as part of a nationwide survey of whitebeams. Among the eight species identified were three species previously unknown to science. Nineteen specimens with oval-shaped leaves were named the Cheddar whitebeam, Aria cheddarensis, fifteen specimens with roundish leaves and greyish brown bark were named the Twin Cliffs whitebeam, Aria eminentoides, and thirteen with long, narrow leaves were named Gough's Rock whitebeam, Aria rupicoloides. The Cheddar whitebeam, which has evolved as a cross between the common whitebeam and the grey-leaved whitebeam, is unique to the gorge, but its survival is threatened by the goats that were introduced specifically to keep down the growth of new trees and encourage the proliferation of rare plant species such as the Cheddar pink. Cuttings have been taken from the trees to be grafted and grown on at the Welsh National Herbarium.

Longleat Estate has fenced off a large part of its land and introduced goats as part of a scheme to encourage the biodiversity of the area; the goats were intended to replace the sheep that grazed in the gorge until the 1970s. The National Trust announced in March 2007 that it planned to release a flock of sheep on its side of the gorge for the same purpose but would first consult local residents and interested parties on whether to fence off the gorge or introduce cattle grids to prevent the sheep from straying. There is already a small flock of feral Soay sheep in the gorge.

== Caves ==
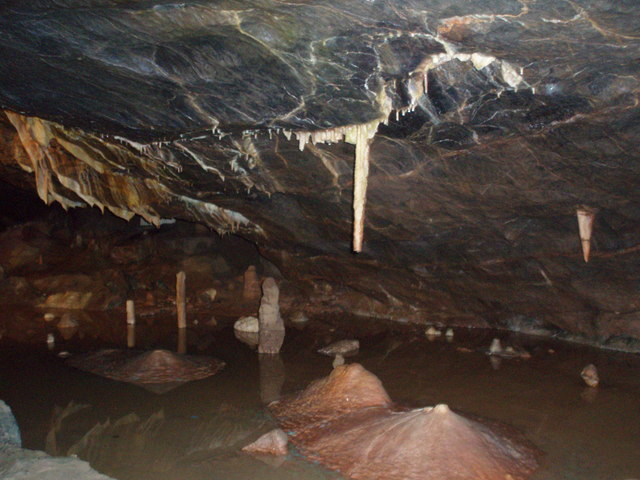
Stalagmites and stalactites in Gough's Cave

The two main caves open to the public are on the south side of the Gorge and owned by Longleat Estate. The extensive Gough's Cave and the smaller Cox's Cave are named after their respective discoverers. Both are known for their geology, and it has been suggested that the caves were used for maturing cheese in prehistoric times.

Gough's cave, which was discovered in 1903, leads some 400 m (437 yd) into the rock face and contains a variety of large rock chambers and formations. Cox's Cave, discovered in 1837, is smaller but contains many intricate formations. In 2016 Cox's cave was turned into Dreamhunters, a multimedia walk-through experience with theatrical lighting and video projection.

The Gorge's many caves are home to colonies of Greater and Lesser horseshoe bats.

In 1999 the Channel 4 television programme Time Team investigated Cooper's Hole in an attempt to find evidence of Palaeolithic human activity.

These caves are the inspirations for the glittering caves of Aglarond situated in the White Mountains behind Helm's Deep in J. R. R. Tolkien's The Two Towers, which was later founded as a new kingdom of Durin's Folk by Gimli after the War of the Ring.

Several of the caves have been scheduled as ancient monuments as nationally important archaeological sites including: Gough's Old Cave, Great Oone's Hole, Saye's Hole, Soldier's Hole and Sun Hole.

== Recreational use ==
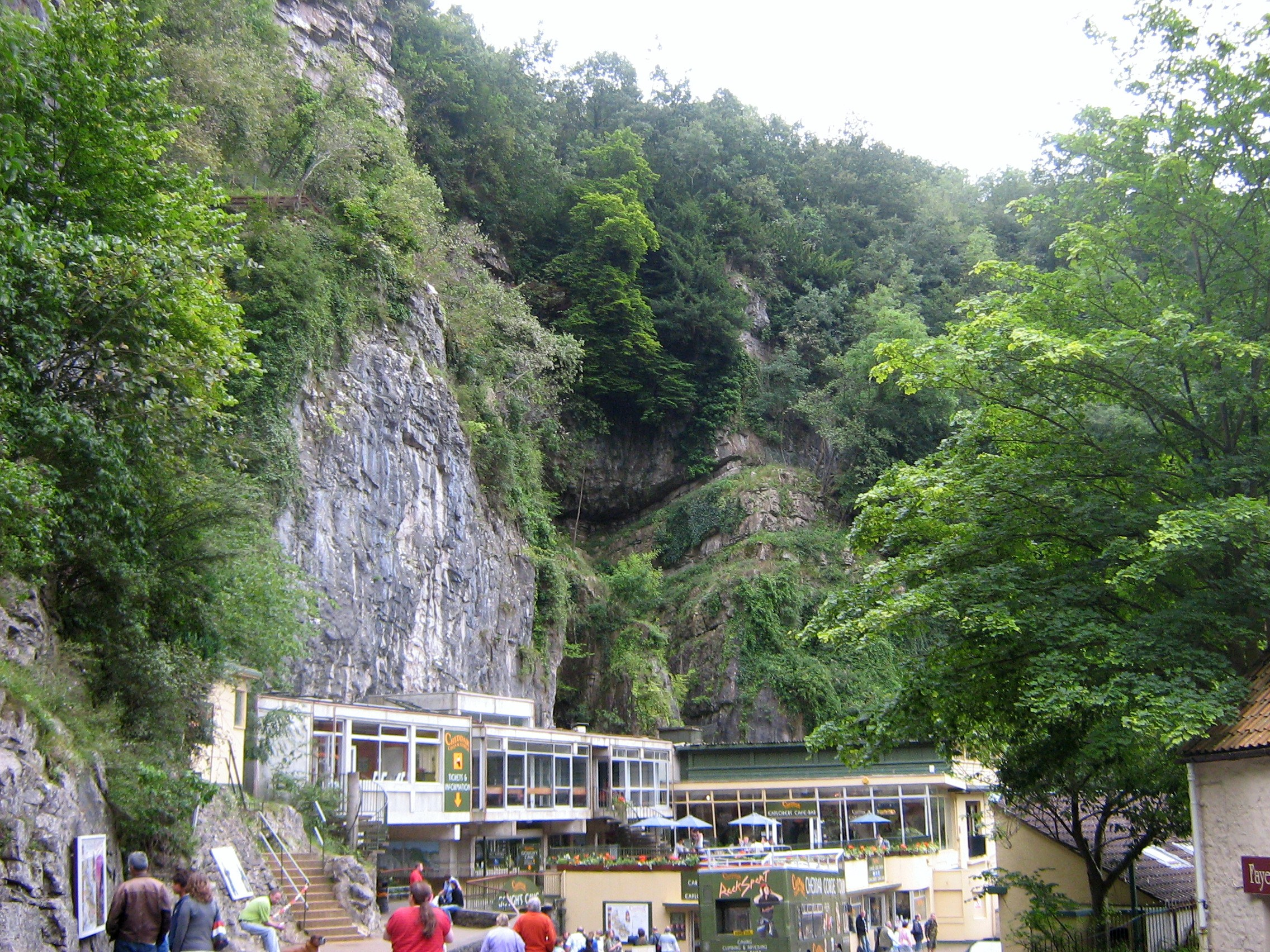
Exposed limestone cliffs above visitor centre and restaurant

Cliff Road (B3135), which runs through the Gorge, offers a popular climb for bicyclists and has a maximum gradient of 16%. The ascent featured in stage 6 of the 2011 Tour of Britain.

There are about 590 graded rock-climbing routes on the south side of the gorge, which are generally open to climbers between 1 October and 15 March each year. The north side of the gorge has about 380 climbing routes and the land is predominantly owned by the National Trust and mapped as Open Access land, which gives a right of access for climbers all year. Each of the routes is named and included in the British Mountaineering Council guidebook. Although the majority of the climbs are "trad" or "traditional", which means that the leader places protection as they go up, there are also some "sport" routes where bolts are left in place. Climber Chris Bonington was the first to scale the Coronation Street route in 1965.

Visitors to the gorge have experienced a number of accidents. Rescue services, including local mountain rescue and cave rescue groups, frequently use the gorge to stage exercises. It is also used as a training location for military rescue-helicopter pilots.

The Cheddar Man Museum of Prehistory, inspired by the discovery of ancient hominids such as Cheddar Man, contains information about the caves and their palaeontological development. Exhibits include original flint tools and human remains excavated from the caves. The Visitors' Centre and Restaurant is an important Modernist design by Geoffrey Jellicoe, dating from 1934. Jellicoe was commissioned by the fifth Marquess of Bath and created a two-block structure with a rooftop pool. He drew inspiration from International Modernist buildings, including the De La Warr Pavilion. The integrity of the building has been greatly compromised. In the 1960s the glass roof to the restaurant, and the pool above it, were removed to increase seating capacity and it has since been reclad in poor-quality materials. Michael Spens, in his comprehensive study The Complete Landscape Designs and Gardens of Geoffrey Jellicoe, writes that it is "now barely recognizable as a pioneer construction of the modern period".

There is a clifftop walk from Jacob's Ladder along the crest of the gorge and back to the road, with views of the gorge. A caving experience is offered in Gough's Cave. There is a path of 274 steps, built up the side of the gorge, known as Jacob's Ladder after the Biblical description of a ladder to the heavens. A watchtower at the top provides a 360–degree view of the entire area and village. An open-top bus operates during the summer. Cheddar cheese is made in the lower part of the gorge.

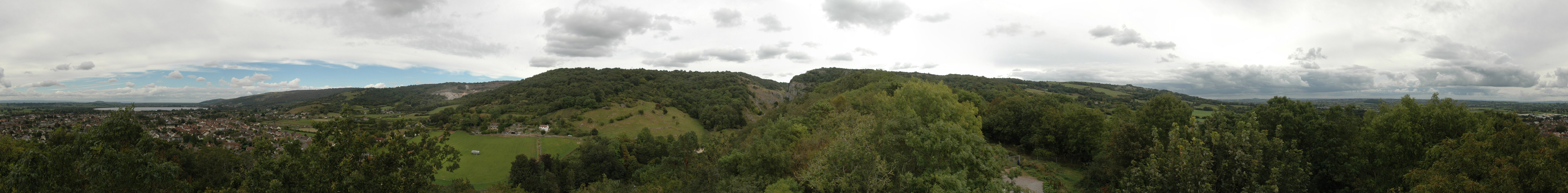
View of Cheddar Village, reservoir, Batts Combe quarry and gorge taken from the watchtower at the top of Jacob's Ladder

== In popular culture ==
In 1916 a scene for the movie Just a Girl was filmed at Cheddar Gorge. The heroine, played by Daisy Burrell, had to fire a revolver while riding a pony, which bolted. Burrell clung on grimly and filming had to be abandoned for the rest of the morning. Parts of the 2025 horror film 28 Years Later were filmed at Cheddar Gorge.

A climb of the gorge in 1965 by Chris Bonington, Tony Greenbank and Mike Thompson was broadcast as part of the World of Sport programme.

Gough's Cave and Cox's Cave were cited by author J. R. R. Tolkien as the inspiration for the Glittering Caves of Helm's Deep in The Lord of the Rings: The Two Towers. Tolkien and his wife, Edith Tolkien, spent their honeymoon in Clevedon, 10 miles north-west of the gorge.

The British artist, drag performer, academic and RuPaul's Drag Race UK series 4´s runner-up Michael John Atkins was inspired by the landmark's name (which they have visited several times during their childhood) to call their drag persona Cheddar Gorgeous.

A level of the 2006 video game Resistance: Fall of Man is set in Cheddar Gorge.

English band The Troggs were photographed for the cover of their first album, From Nowhere, at Cheddar Caves.

== See also ==
- Geology of the United Kingdom
- List of National Trust properties in Somerset

== External ==
- Cheddar Caves and Gorge, a commercial company operating some of the tourist attractions at Cheddar Gorge, Somerset
- British Geological Survey information about Cheddar Gorge
- Cheddar Gorge at Beautiful World
