= Litton, Somerset =

Village and civil parish in Somerset, England

Coordinates: 51.2890°N 2.5829°W

Litton
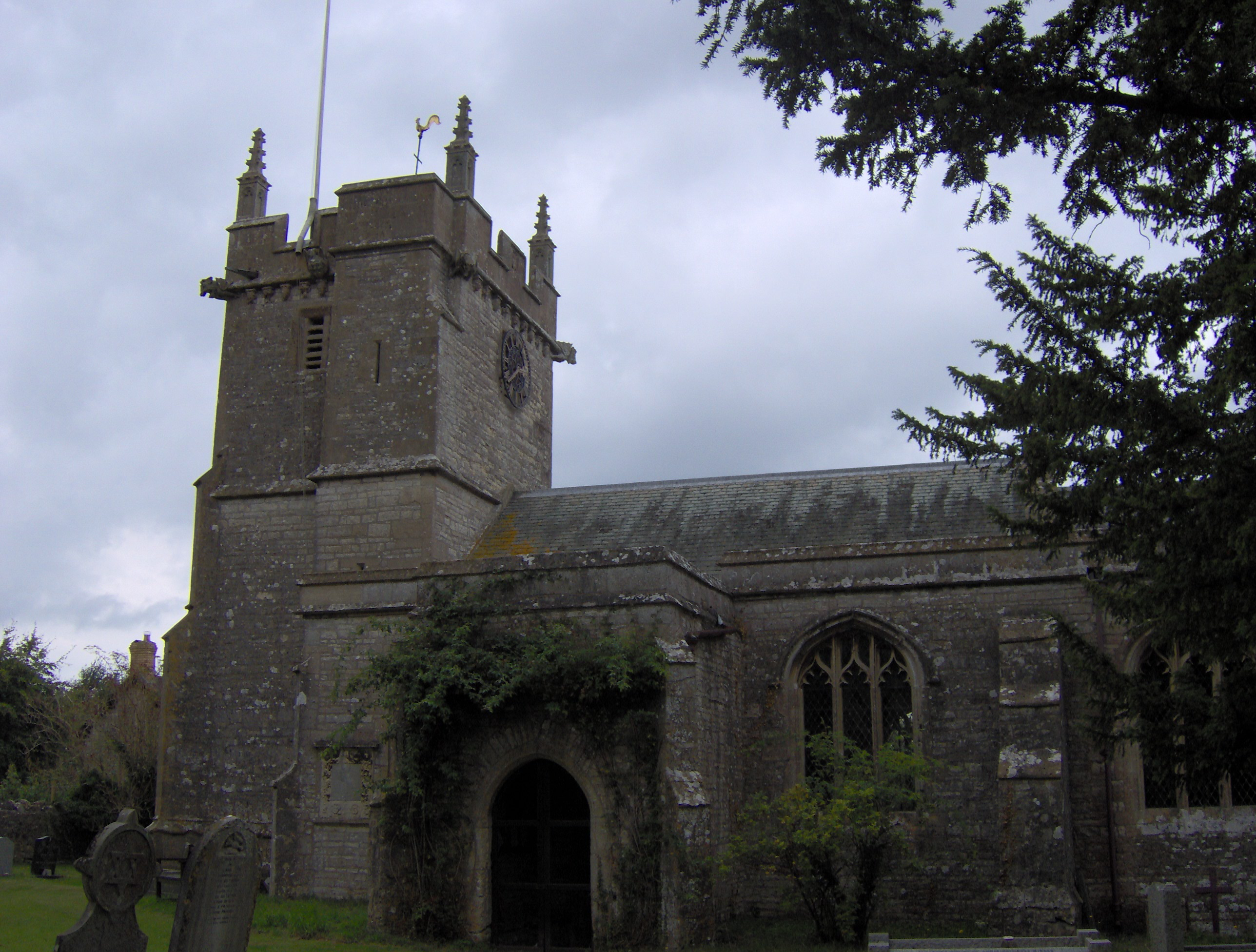
- Church of St Mary, Litton

- Location within Somerset
- Population: 240 (2011)
- OS grid reference: ST593546
- Unitary authority: Somerset Council
- Ceremonial county: Somerset
- Region: South West
- Country: England
- Sovereign state: United Kingdom
- Post town: RADSTOCK
- Postcode district: BA3
- Dialling code: 01761
- Police: Avon and Somerset
- Fire: Devon and Somerset
- Ambulance: South Western
- UK Parliament: Wells and Mendip Hills

Litton (grid reference ST593546) is a small village and civil parish between Chewton Mendip and West Harptree in the Chew Valley and Mendip Hills, Somerset, England. The parish includes the hamlet of Sherborne. Very close to the village are the Litton Reservoirs.

== History ==
Litton was listed in the Domesday Book of 1086 as Litune, meaning 'The small enclosure' from the Old English lyt and tun. It was the property of Gisa, Bishop of Wells.

The shape of some of the existing fields with cross-slope and down-slope field banks and cultivated ridges forming an interleaving irregular mosaic suggest they are of medieval origin.

The parish was part of the hundred of Wells Forum.

== Governance ==
The parish council has responsibility for local issues, including setting an annual precept (local rate) to cover the council's operating costs and producing annual accounts for public scrutiny. The parish council evaluates local planning applications and works with the local police, district council officers, and neighbourhood watch groups on matters of crime, security, and traffic. The parish council's role also includes initiating projects for the maintenance and repair of parish facilities, as well as consulting with the district council on the maintenance, repair, and improvement of highways, drainage, footpaths, public transport, and street cleaning. Conservation matters (including trees and listed buildings) and environmental issues are also the responsibility of the council.

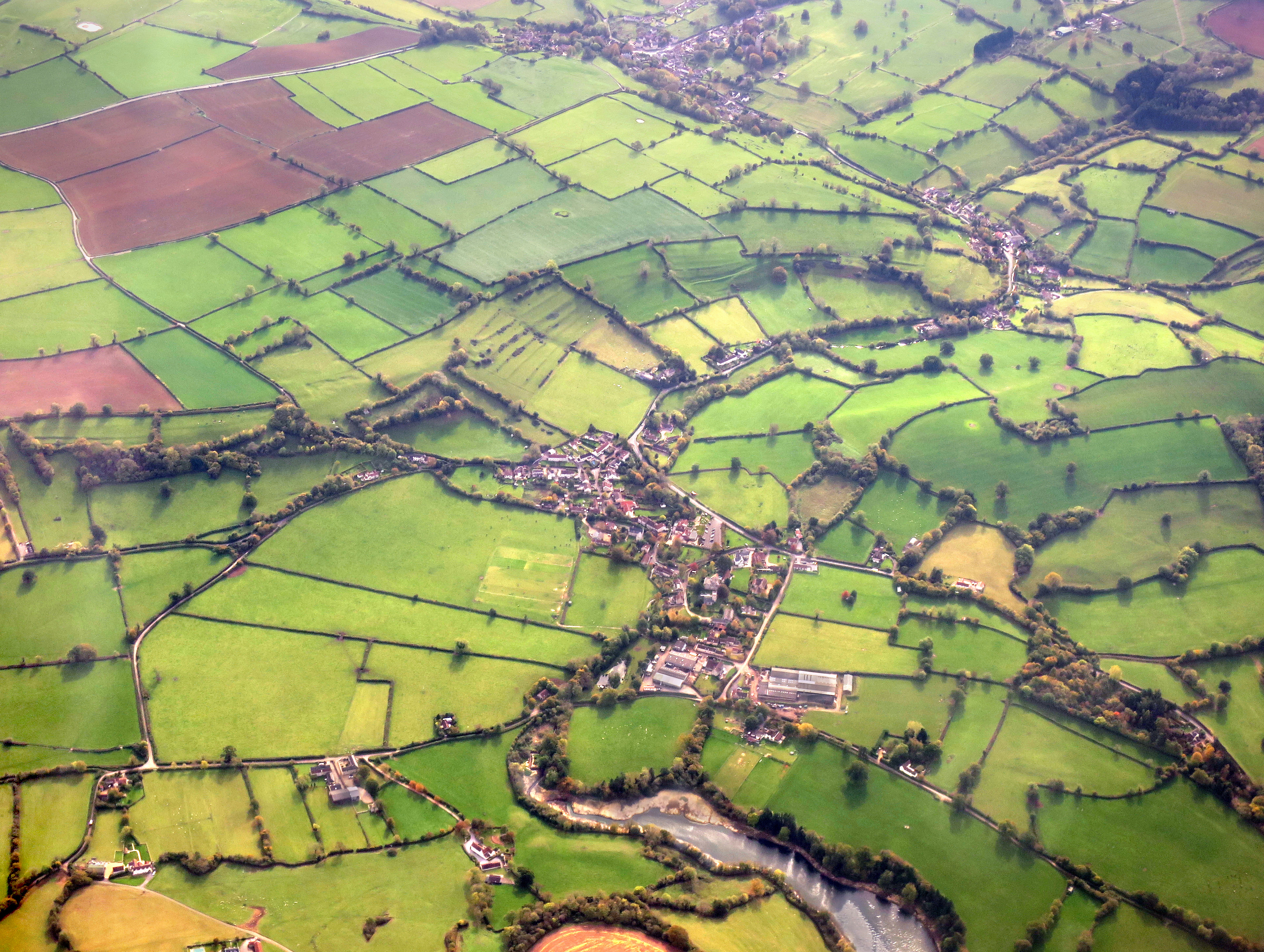
An aerial view of the village and the surrounding area.

For local government purposes, since 1 April 2023, the parish comes under the unitary authority of Somerset Council. Prior to this, it was part of the non-metropolitan district of Mendip (established under the Local Government Act 1972). It was part of Clutton Rural District before 1974.

It is also part of the Wells and Mendip Hills county constituency represented in the House of Commons of the Parliament of the United Kingdom. It elects one Member of Parliament (MP) by the first past the post system of election.

== Demographics ==
According to the 2001 Census, the Nedge Ward (which includes Chewton Mendip), had 2,074 residents, living in 893 households, with an average age of 40.0 years. Of these 78% of residents describing their health as 'good', 18% of 16- to 74-year-olds had no qualifications; and the area had an unemployment rate of 1.8% of all economically active people aged 16–74. In the Index of Multiple Deprivation 2004, it was ranked at 26,803 out of 32,482 wards in England, where 1 was the most deprived LSOA and 32,482 the least deprived.

== Church of St Mary ==
The Anglican Church of St Mary dates from the 13th century. It has a Perpendicular tower with a bell chamber. It is a Grade I listed building. Several of the memorials and crosses in the churchyard are also listed buildings.

== Buildings ==
There are a range of other listed buildings in the village including Sherborne House, which is a Grade II listed building, as is Manor Farmhouse, which dates from the early 17th century.

Shortwood House residing on the outskirts of the village, holds significant historic importance. Built in 1806 as the home for serving Catholic Priests, the building incorporated a Catholic chapel.

Shortwood House is also the birth place of Brenda Pye (29 November 1907 – 26 April 2005), also known as Brenda Landon or Brenda Capron, who was an English portrait painter and landscape artist. She exhibited at the Royal Academy, the Paris Salon, the Royal Society of Portrait Painters, the Royal Society of British Artists and the Association of Women Artists; she was also a member of the Association of Sussex Artists.

Her earliest years were spent at her birthplace: Shortwood House, Litton, in Somerset, to which her father Walter Capron had retired from his London practice. A now famous three-quarter length portrait of her in the gardens of Shortwood House in the summer of 1914, was painted by Henry Strachey, at that time the art critic of the Spectator, who lived nearby.
