= Litton Reservoirs =

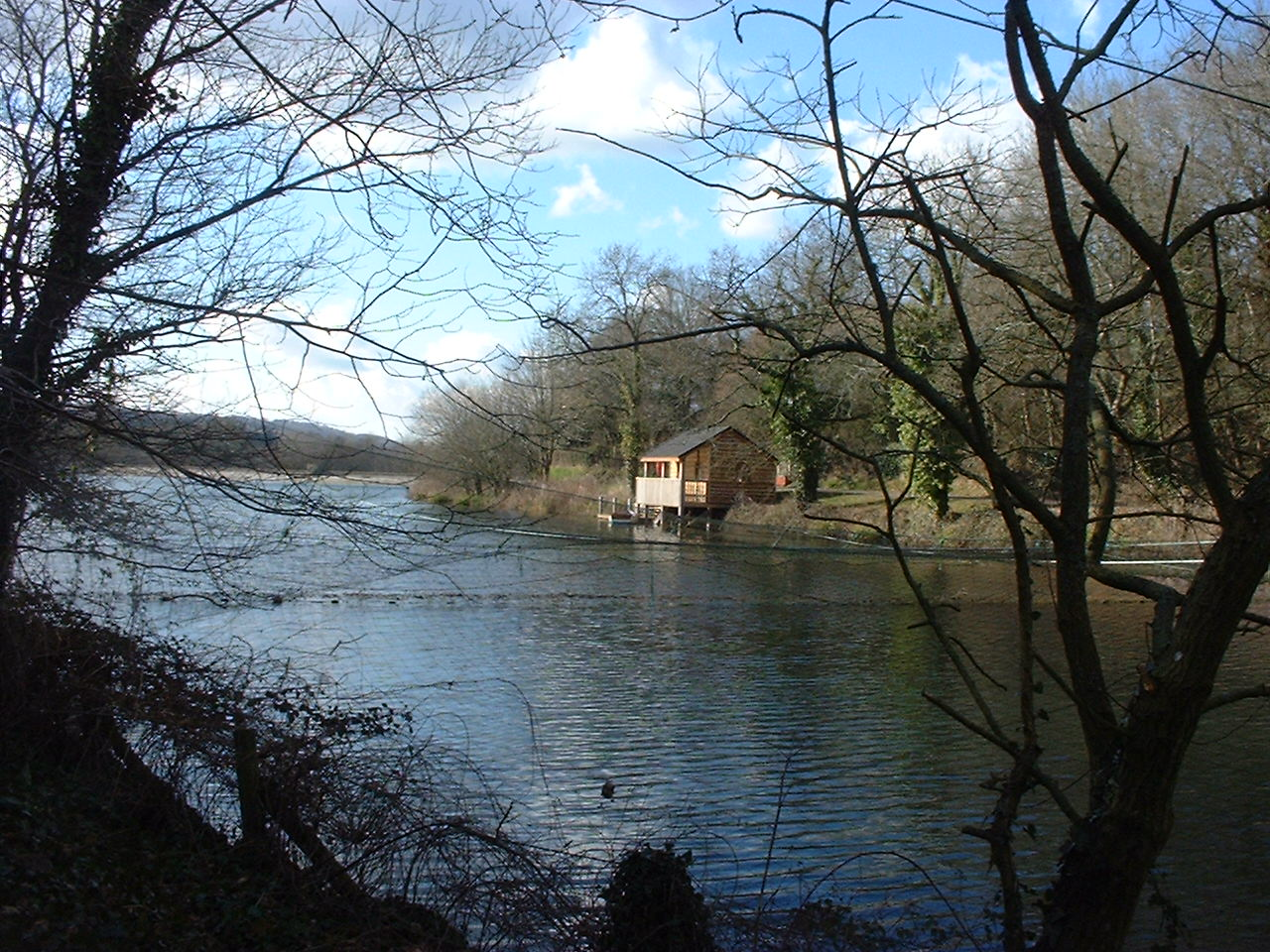
- Lower Reservoir

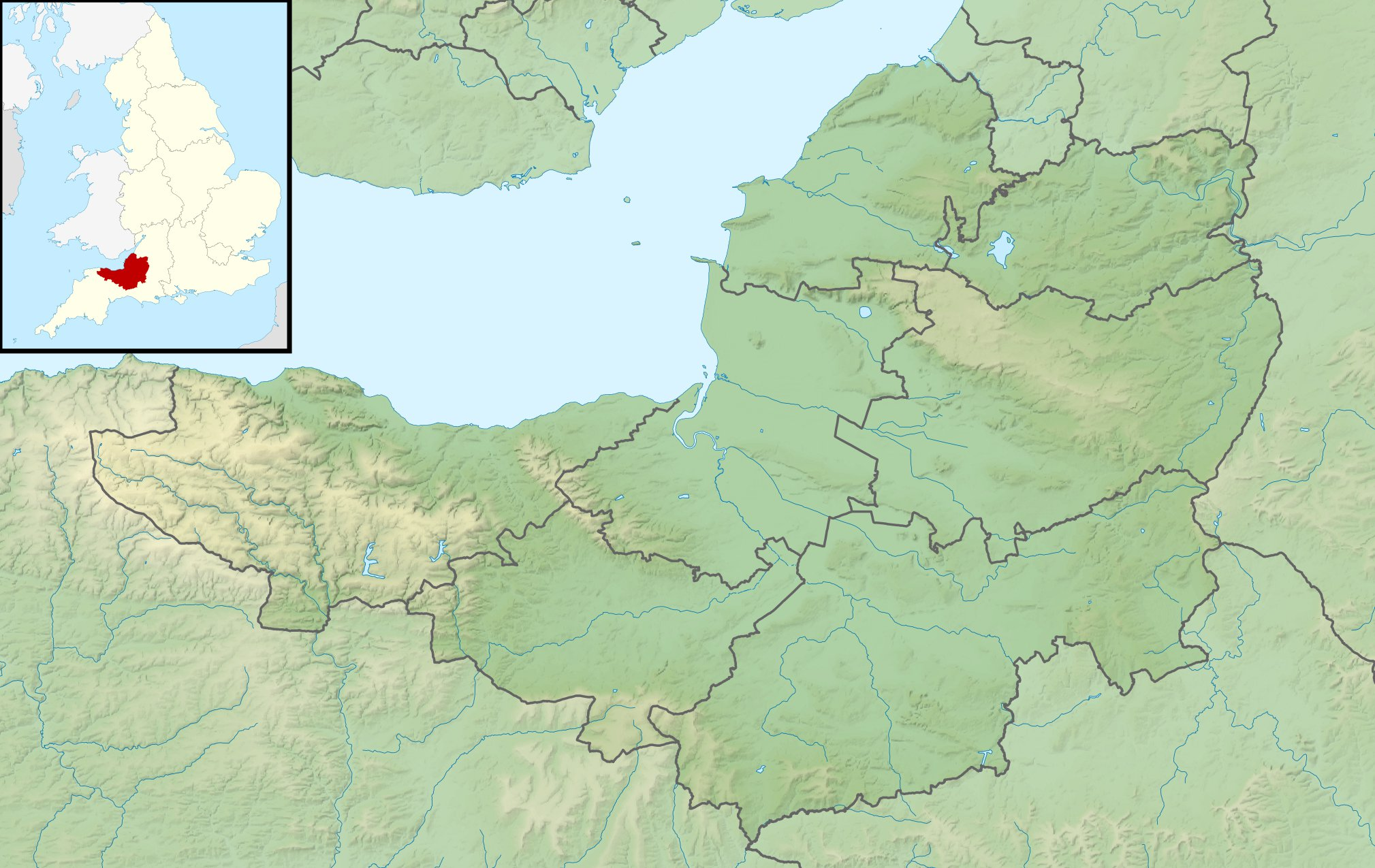
- Location within Somerset
- Location: Somerset
- Coordinates: 51.29534°N 2.58941°W
- Type: reservoirs
- Primary inflows: River Chew
- Primary outflows: River Chew
- Basin countries: United Kingdom
- Built: c. 1850
- Surface area: 8 acres (3.2 ha) (Lower); 16 acres (6.5 ha) (Upper)

Litton Reservoirs (also known as Coley Reservoirs) (grid reference ST590553) are two reservoirs near the village of Litton, Somerset, England. They are operated by Bristol Water.

They lie on the boundary between Bath and North East Somerset and Mendip districts.

The individual lakes are called Lower Litton and Upper Litton. The former is 8 acres (32,000 m^{2}) in size, the latter 16 acres (65,000 m^{2}) and much deeper. They were built around 1850 by the Bristol Waterworks Company in conjunction with the "Line of Works" to bring water from the Mendip Hills to Bristol.

A public footpath goes around the lakes and across the dam. The banks are home to a variety of flowers including primroses (Primula vulgaris), common bluebell (Hyacinthoides non-scripta), wood anemone (Anemone nemorosa), violets and red campion.

Several species of birds are frequent visitors including moorhens, coots, mallards, mute swans and tufted ducks.

Fishing (under permit) is generally for rainbow (Oncorhynchus mykiss) and brown trout (Salmo trutta). Fish breeding takes place in the netted area immediately below the upper dam is the site for fish breeding.

== Photographs ==
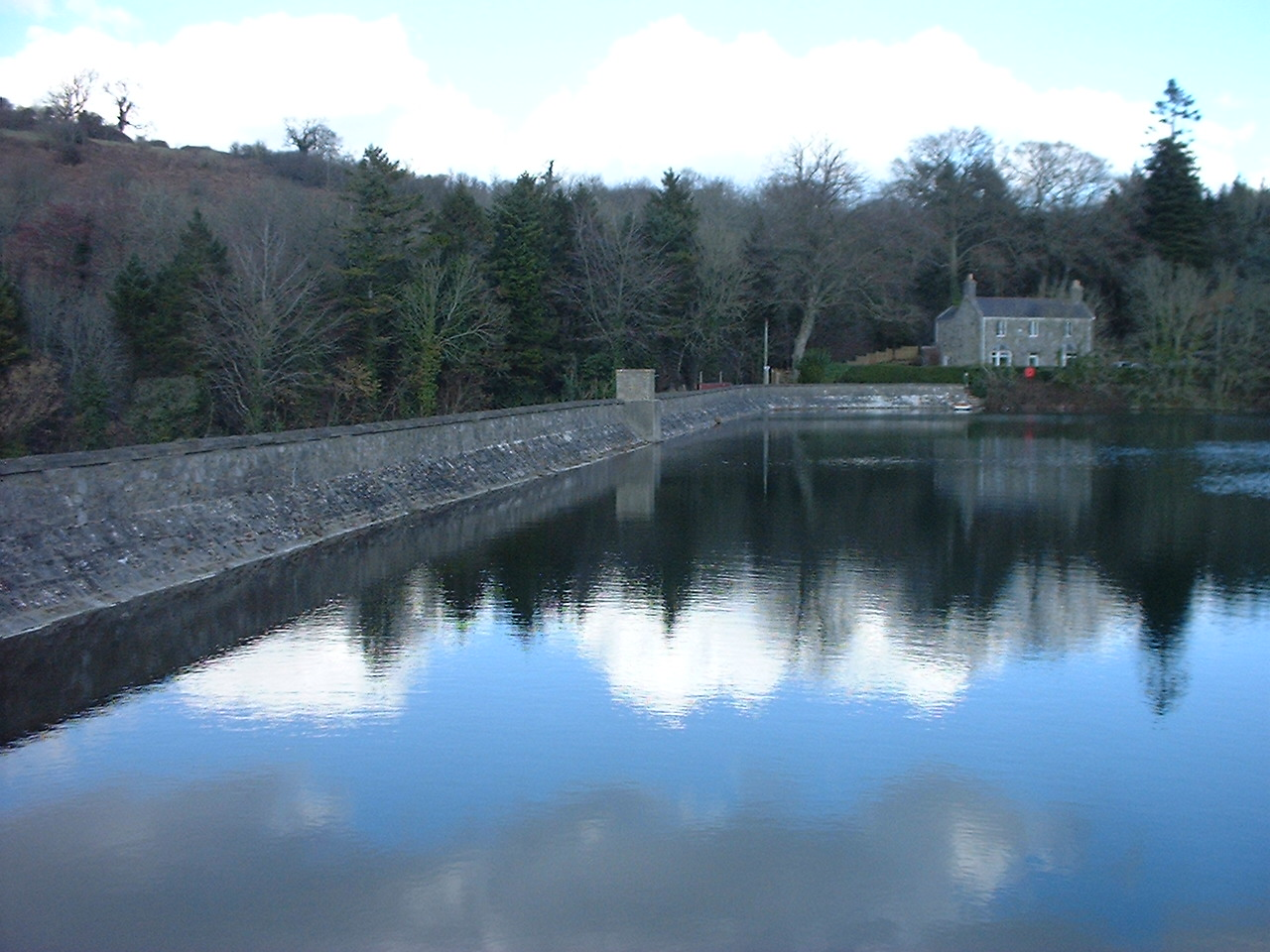
Upper dam

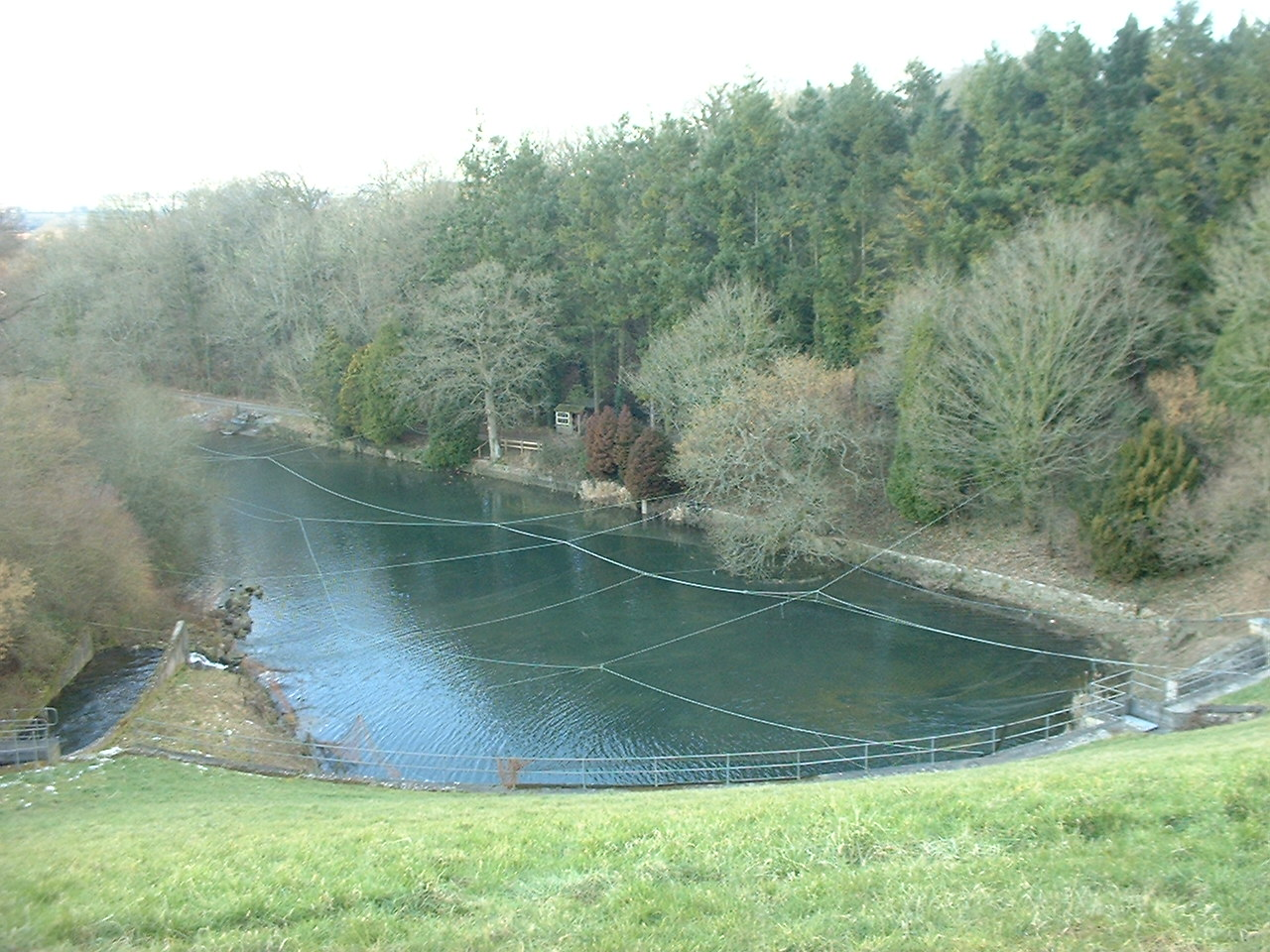
Lower reservoir showing fish protection nets

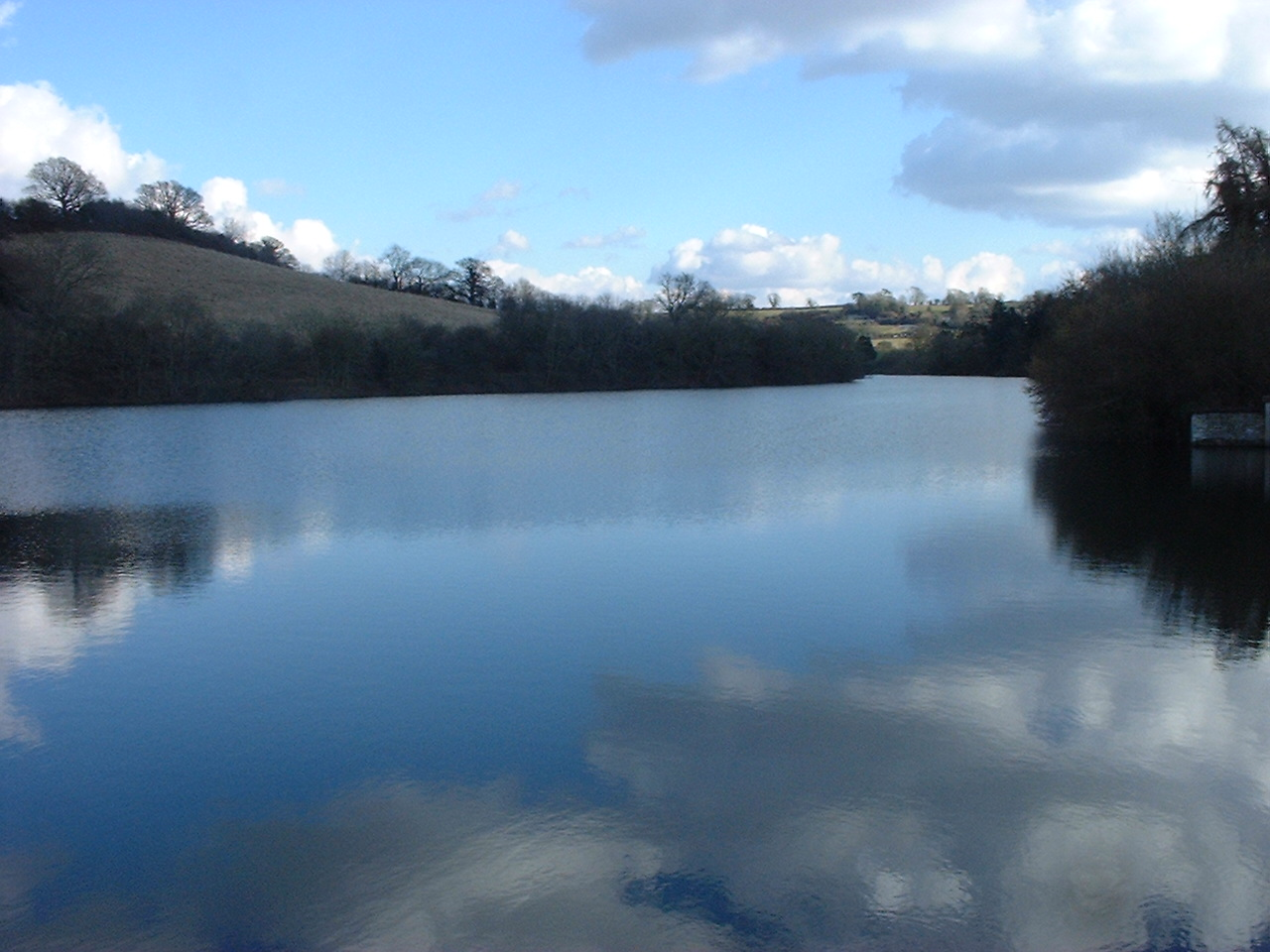
Upper reservoir taken from the dam

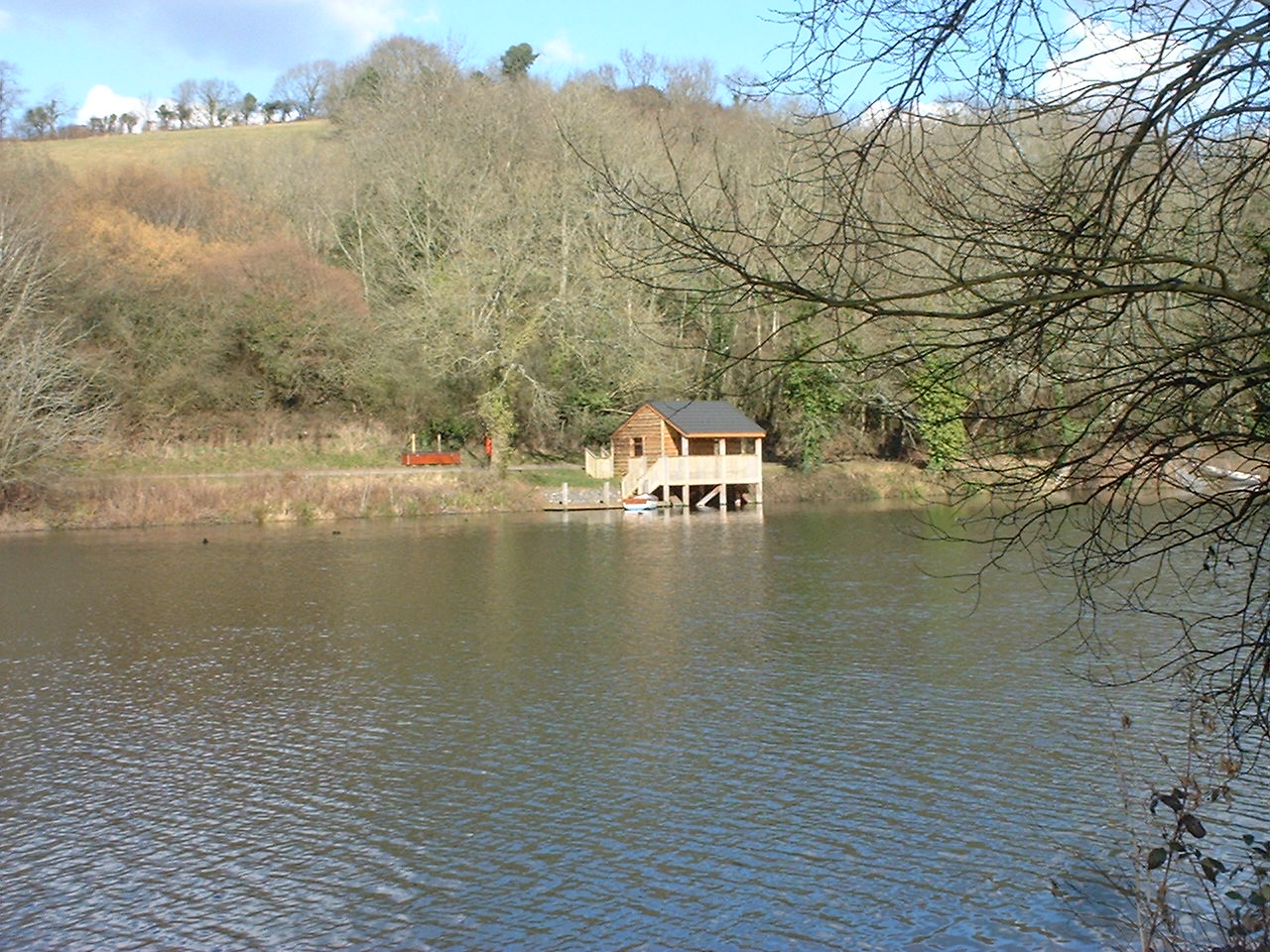
Boat house on the lower Litton Reservoir

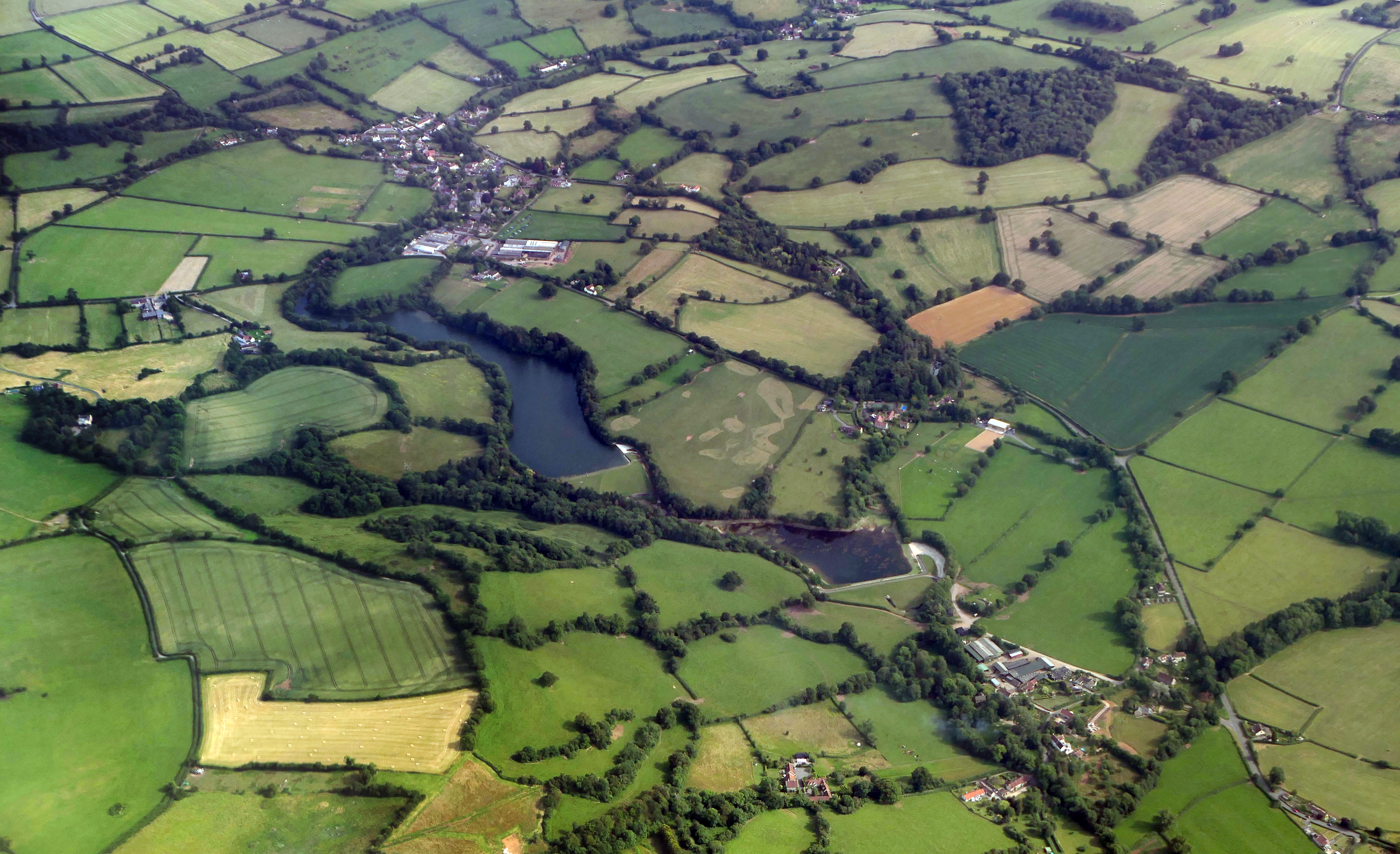
An aerial view
