= Cheddar Valley =

Cheddar Valley may refer to:

- The area surrounding the village of Cheddar, Somerset, England
- A brand name of cider produced by Thatchers Cider
- Cheddar Valley line, a former railway line of the area
- Cheddar Valley, New Zealand, a locality in Whakatāne District
