= Harptree Combe =

Valley in England

- Site of Special Scientific Interest
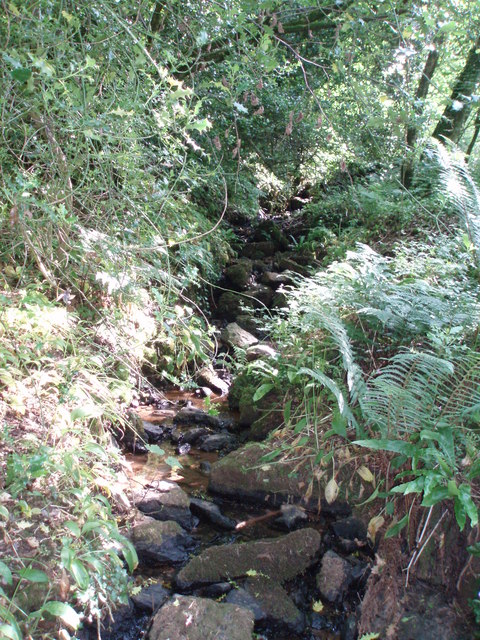

- Location within Somerset
- Location of Harptree Combe.
- Area of search: Avon
- Grid reference: ST561558
- Coordinates: 51.29962°N 2.63106°W
- Interest: Biological
- Area: 13.63 hectares (0.1363 km^{2}; 0.0526 sq mi)
- Notification date: 1954

Harptree Combe (grid reference ST561558) is a 13.63-hectare (33.68-acre) Site of Special Scientific Interest (SSSI) near East Harptree notified in 1954. "Combe" or "coombe" is a West Country word meaning a steep-sided valley. It is also the site of a 19th-century aqueduct and is overlooked by the site of a castle dating from around 1100.

In August 2009, 22.67 acres (9.17 ha) of the Combe were purchased by Alan Sheppard for £60,000. He became the third owner since 1805, the previous sale being in 1922.

== Ecology ==
Appleyard's Feather-moss Brachythecium appleyardiae was described as new to science from this site in 1981, although doubt has been cast on the validity of the species as a result of genetic evidence published in 2005 which suggests that this moss is in fact a member of the widespread moss species Scleropodium cespitans.

Grassy clearings within the combe are the only site in Avon where the nationally scarce Spreading Bellflower Campanula patula is found. The species was first found here in 1829.

Harptree Combe is a narrow limestone gorge containing a variety of habitats, including Ash woodland, rough grassland, natural and artificial rock faces, and a small, marshy stream. The valley wood has been identified as an ancient woodland site, rich in tree and shrub species, and with a ground flora containing plants such as Herb Paris Paris quadrifolia), indicative of such undisturbed habitats. Several other uncommon or local plants, such as Small Teasel Dipsacus pilosus and Autumn Crocus Colchicum autumnale, also occur. The limestone rock exposures and aqueduct walls are location for many species of moss and fern, some of which, e.g. Rusty Beard-moss Didymodon ferrugineus (previously Barbula reflexa), Brown Beard-moss Didymodon spadiceus (previously Barbula spadicea) and Brittle Bladder-fern Cystopteris fragilis, are rare in Southern England.

== Aqueduct ==
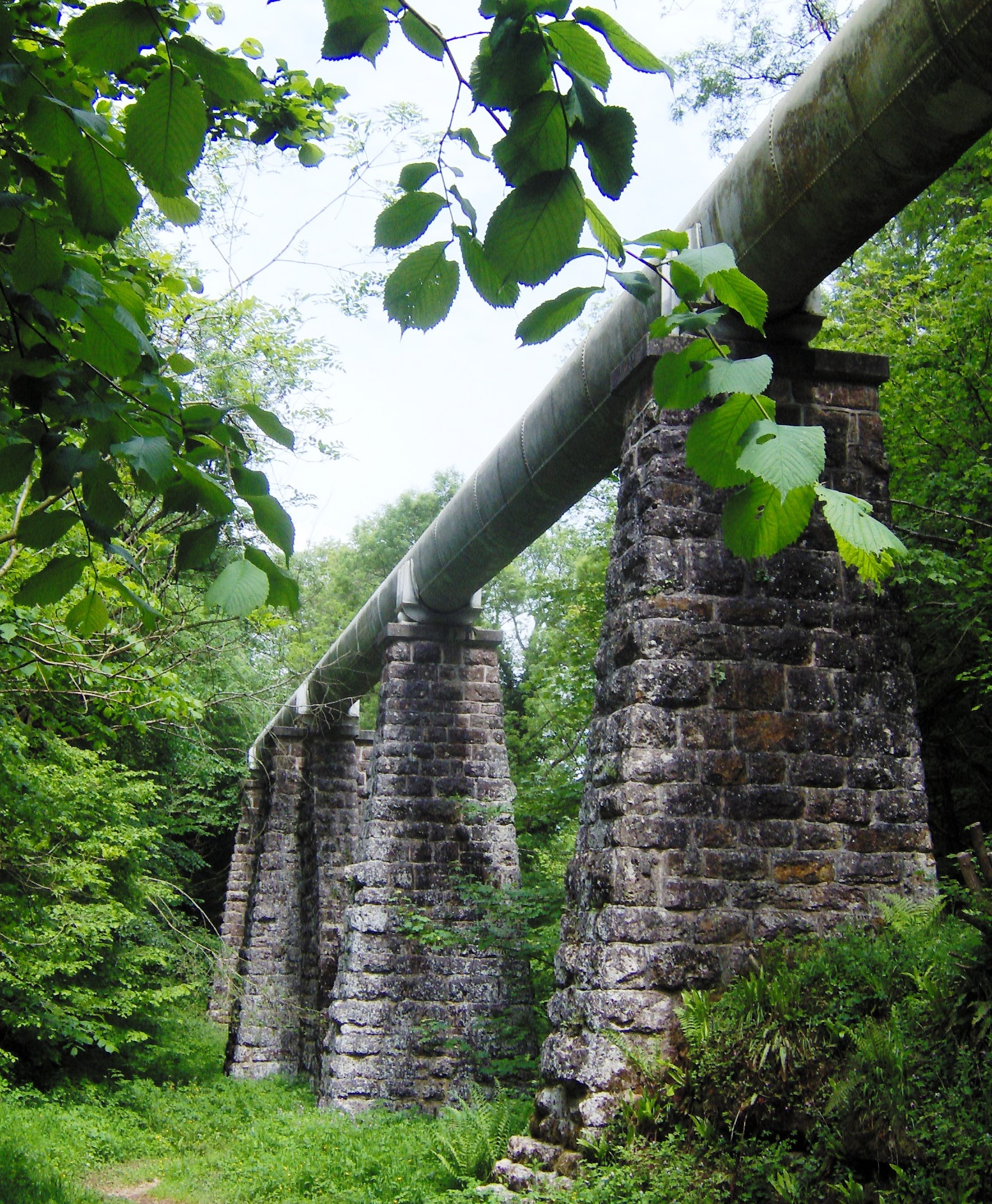
The aqueduct in Harptree Combe

An aqueduct for Bristol water supply follows the line of the combe. It was completed in 1851, with James Simpson acting as the chief engineer, and it is still in use today. It consists of a wrought iron tube, which runs underground for 18 kilometres (11 mi), to Bristol Reservoirs but where it appears above ground it is supported by limestone piers and abutments. It is probably the oldest surviving example of such engineering and has been designated by English Heritage as a grade II listed building.

== Richmont Castle ==
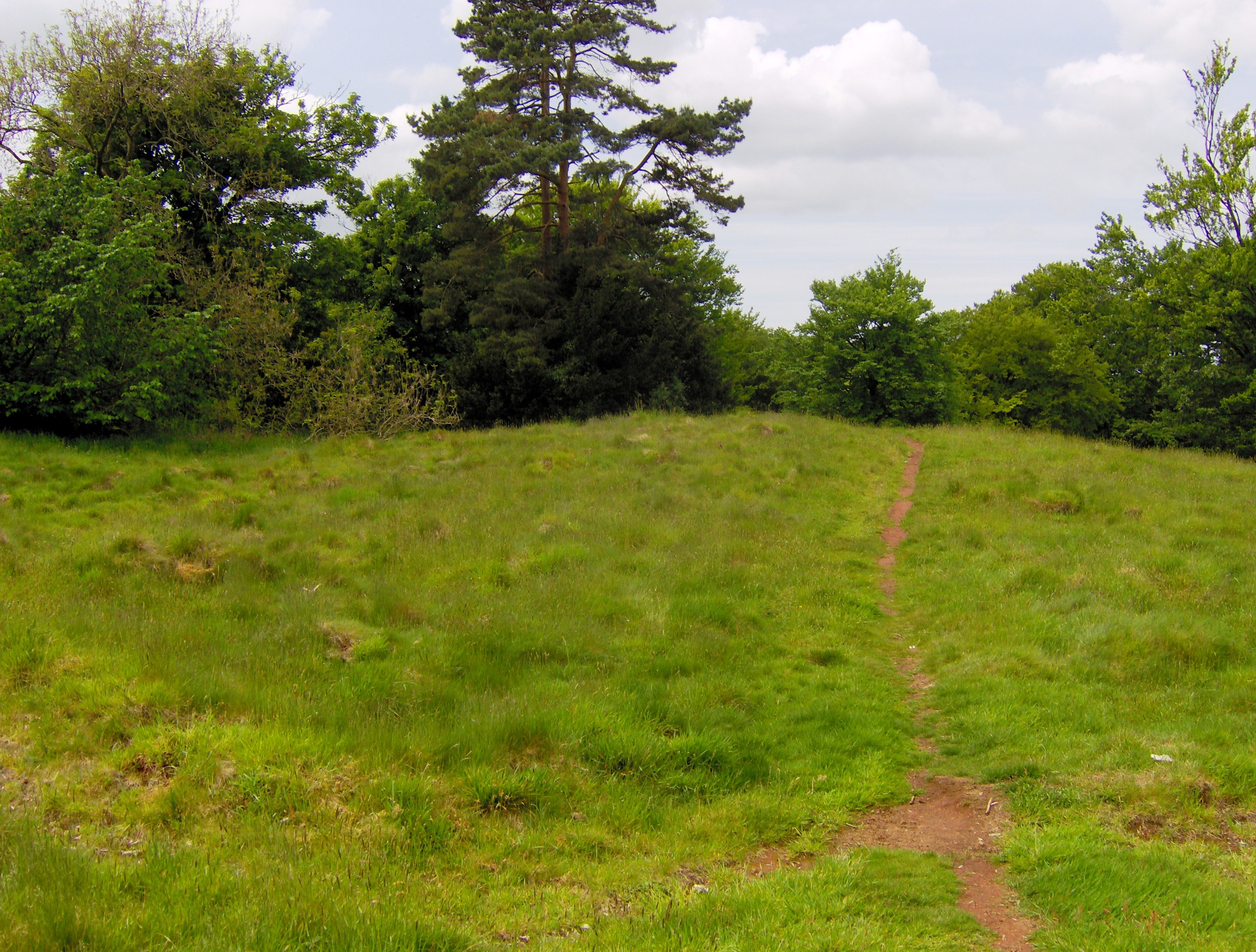
Site of Richmont Castle

The scanty ruins of Richmont Castle are just above the combe. The castle was besieged in 1138 when King Stephen captured it from Sir William de Harptree, a supporter of Queen Matilda's cause, in the civil war between the king and queen. The castle was also visited by King John in 1205. The castle was demolished by its owner, Sir John Newton, in the reign of Henry VIII.

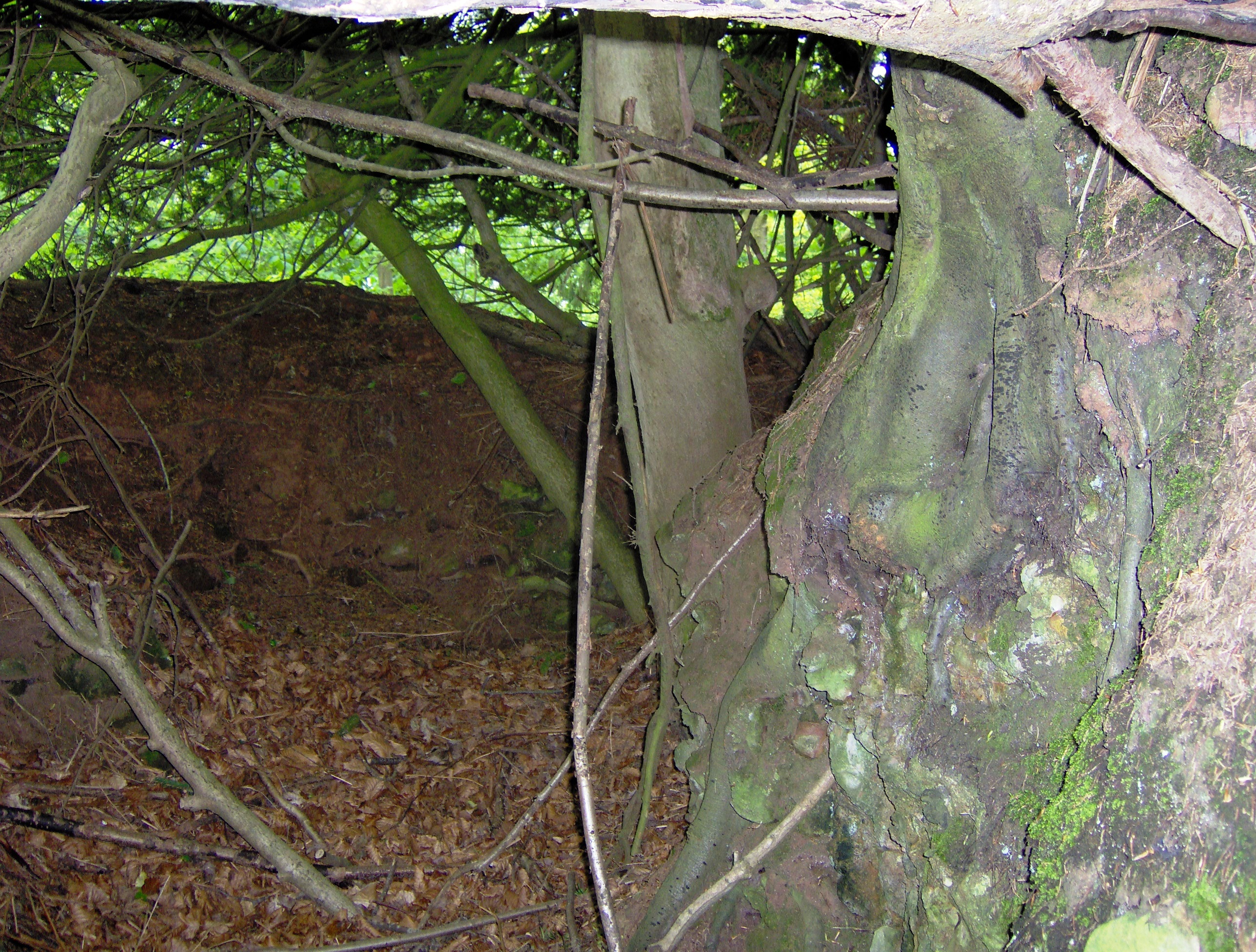
Earthworks of Richmont Castle

Wade and Wade in their 1929 book Somerset described it: "On an inaccessible tongue of land at the far end of the gorge are the remains of Richmont Castle, one of those lawless strongholds which in the days of Stephen were a terror to the country side. In 1138 it was strongly garrisoned by its owner, William de Harptree, on behalf of the Empress Matilda, but was taken by Stephen by the ruse of a feigned repulse. Now, only a fragment of the keep overlooks the glen." Some earthworks are still visible but partially covered by the undergrowth.
