= Bristol Water =

British water company

Bristol Water PLC
- Type: Public limited company
- Industry: Water supply
- Founded: 16 July 1846
- Headquarters: Bristol, England
- Area served: 2,600 km^{2} (1,000 sq mi) of South west England
- Key people: Mel Karam, CEO
- Products: Drinking water
- Production output: 0.266 Gl/day (drinking)
- Revenue: ▲£ 111 million (2015-16); £ 105.3 million (2011-12)
- Number of employees: 468
- Parent: Pennon Group
- Website: www.bristolwater.co.uk

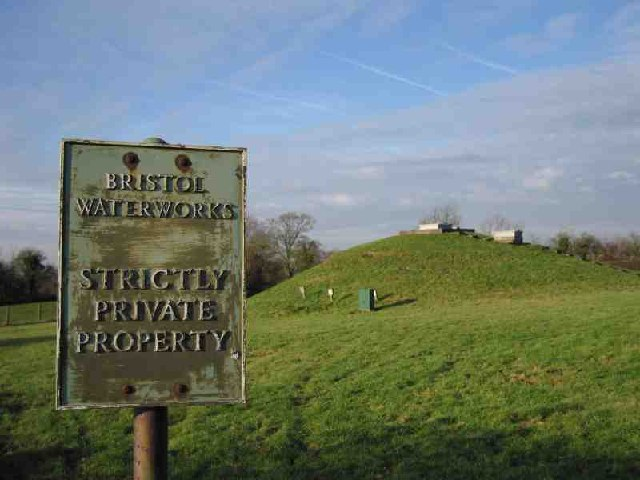

Bristol Water is a British water company which supplies 266 million litres of drinking water daily to over 1.2 million customers in a 2,600 km^{2} (1,000 sq mi) area centred on Bristol, England. It is regulated under the Water Industry Act 1991. Sewerage services in the Bristol area are provided by Wessex Water.

Approximately half the water is taken from the Mendip Hills, particularly Chew Valley Lake, Blagdon Lake, Cheddar Reservoir and Barrow Gurney Reservoirs, with the other half piped from the River Severn via the Gloucester and Sharpness Canal. There are 6,772 km (4,208 mi) of local water mains.

In June 2021, Pennon Group acquired Bristol Water for $563 million.

== History ==
During the medieval period, Bristol had a remarkably efficient water supply, as there were a large number of wells and springs, and most streets had a wooden trough into which water was discharged. The troughs were supplied by local priories, as most of the wells and springs were also owned by religious foundations, but with the Dissolution of the Monasteries between 1536 and 1541, maintenance and upkeep of the system passed to parishes. As the population increased, they proved inadequate and started to become polluted. The first Bristol Waterworks Company was set up in 1695, and obtained water from Hanham Mills, on the edge of the city limits, which was piped into the main part of the city in hollowed-out elm pipes. The scheme was completed in 1698, but never worked well, as the company was not well organised or managed, and it gradually got into serious debt. The Corporation of Bristol were unwilling to take over the scheme, and the company became bankrupt in 1782.

Bath and Bristol Canal and Bristol Waterworks Act 1811
- Act of Parliament
- Parliament of the United Kingdom
- Long title: An Act for making a navigable Canal between the Cities of Bath and Bristol, and also for supplying with Water the Inhabitants of the city of Bristol and its Neighbourhood.
- Citation: 51 Geo. 3. c. clxvii

Dates
- Royal assent: 15 June 1811

Text of statute as originally enacted

The need for fresh water increased significantly between 1804 and 1809, when William Jessop carried out work to improve the facilities of Bristol Harbour, known as the Floating Harbour because water levels were unaffected by the tides. Large numbers of extra ships used the facilities, and needed their water tanks to be filled before putting back out to sea. There was an idea to build a canal from the Kennet and Avon Canal near Bath into Bristol, which would be used by boats and also as a water supply channel, but that scheme failed due to lack of funds after obtaining an enabling act of Parliament, the Bath and Bristol Canal and Bristol Waterworks Act 1811 (51 Geo. 3. c. clxvii). A commission was appointed in 1844 to consider the state of large towns in England, and reported that Bristol was one of the worst large towns in respect of water supply. Most water came from wells, the water was hard, making it unsuitable for washing, and the difficulty of obtaining the water meant that it was used very sparingly.

By the spring of 1845, there were two groups attempting to supply Bristol with water. The Merchant Venturers Company had proposed a scheme to supply the area of Clifton with water from two springs on the banks of the River Avon. Although that scheme had not been authorised in 1842, their proposal was to extend it, and they had enlisted the support of Isambard Kingdom Brunel as engineer. Edwin Chadwick and Thomas Hawksley had failed to persuade them that they should implement a combined water supply and drainage scheme, as just supplying water often led to worse sanitary conditions, with cesspits overflowing if there was no network of sewers to carry waste away. The second group proposed bringing water from the Mendip Hills and other springs in Somerset, and after some consideration of various engineers at a meeting held in the Bristol Corn Exchange on 20 June 1845, appointed James Simpson, based on his wide experience of water supply projects. In the ensuing parliamentary battle, the second group won, becoming the Bristol Waterworks Company.

=== Line of works ===
Bristol Waterworks Act 1846
- Act of Parliament
- Parliament of the United Kingdom
- Long title: An Act for supplying with Water the City of Bristol and certain Parishes adjacent thereto in the Counties of Gloucester and Somerset.
- Citation: 9 & 10 Vict. c. ccxxii

Dates
- Royal assent: 16 July 1846

The company, formally known as Bristol Waterworks Company, was formed on 16 July 1846 by the Bristol Waterworks Act 1846 (9 & 10 Vict. c. ccxxii). The first general meeting was held in the White Lion Hotel on Broad Street, when members of the first committee included the Quakers William Budd, a physician who helped control cholera outbreaks in Bristol, Francis Fry of the Fry family known for producing chocolate, and George Thomas. The 1846 act authorised the construction of Simpson's "Line of Works", an 11-mile (18 km) aqueduct designed to carry water from Chewton and Litton to Barrow Gurney. A network of open-jointed drains and culverts were constructed at Chewton and Litton, to collect water from springs, which were located at a level some 400 feet (120 m) above that of Bristol Harbour. These fed into an egg-shaped masonry culvert, which followed the contours of the land for 2.25 miles (3.62 km), and was built by the cut-and-cover method. This fed into a tunnel cut through a ridge of magnesium limestone conglomerate, after which a rivetted wrought iron tube carried the water over the Harptree ravine. This section is 350 feet (110 m) long, and is carried on stone piers nearly 60 feet (18 m) above the valley floor. There are three further tunnels, with a combined length of 2.75 miles (4.43 km), two more wrought iron sections to cross ravines, both 825 feet (251 m) long, and 4.25 miles (6.84 km) of 30-inch (76 cm) cast iron pipes. The pipes had an average gradient of around 10 inches per mile (16 cm per km), but the gradient was not uniform, and there was a high point on Breach Hill Lane, to the south of Chew Stoke. To prevent an air lock forming, an open vent was constructed, sufficiently high to ensure that water could not escape through it, and a stone obelisk was constructed around it, standing 50 feet (15 m) high.

A reservoir was constructed at Barrow Gurney to receive the water, and because the springs at Chewton were the source of the River Chew, the company was required to build three compensation reservoirs, so that the flow in the river could be maintained. Two were constructed at Litton, with a third on the Winford Brook near Chew Magna. Water was fed into the supply system from three service reservoirs. Cotham reservoir was fed by gravity from Barrow Gurney, and some of its water was then pumped to Durdham Down reservoir, which was outside the city limits at the time. The third reservoir at Bedminster Down supplied the district to the south of the harbour, and was fed by gravity from Cold Bath spring, a little to the west of Barrow Gurney. The construction work was finished in 1851, and was designed to deliver 4 million imperial gallons (18 Ml) per day, but by 1860 the company had realised that this was not achievable in dry years.

Bristol Waterworks Act 1862
- Act of Parliament
- Parliament of the United Kingdom
- Long title: An Act to repeal and consolidate the Acts relating to the Bristol Waterworks Company; to empower the Company to make fresh Works; and for other Purposes.
- Citation: 25 & 26 Vict. c. xxx

Dates
- Royal assent: 3 June 1862

Bristol Waterworks Amendment Act 1865
- Act of Parliament
- Parliament of the United Kingdom
- Long title: An Act for granting further Powers to the Bristol Waterworks Company, and for the Amendment of their existing Act.
- Citation: 28 & 29 Vict. c. xxvi

Dates
- Royal assent: 26 May 1865
Other legislation
Amends	Bristol Waterworks Act 1862

In 1862 they therefore obtained another act of Parliament, the Bristol Waterworks Act 1862 (25 & 26 Vict. c. xxx), to authorise the construction of a second reservoir at Barrow. However, there was very little rain in the winters of 1861, 1862 and 1863, resulting in the yield from the springs that fed the first reservoir being seriously depleted. With the second reservoir not yet completed, they resorted to obtaining water from any springs that they could, but even with temporary pumping, they could not supply more than 350,000 imperial gallons (1.6 Ml) per day. The 1862 act also required them to build a compensation reservoir at Barrow Gurney, to enable mills to keep operating. Barrow No. 2 reservoir was finished in 1866, and the two reservoirs could store 350 million imperial gallons (1,600 Ml), representing 88 days at the maximum rate of supply. Meanwhile, they had obtained the Bristol Waterworks Amendment Act 1865 (28 & 29 Vict. c. xxvi), which allowed them to obtain water from springs at Chelvey and Migdel, several miles to the west of Barrow Gurney. Simpson anticipated that they might need to extract ground water in due course, and sited the Chelvey pumping station at a location where wells could be driven down into the underlying red sandstone.

Aqueducts were constructed to bring water from the springs to the pumping station, which could pump 1.33 million imperial gallons (6.0 Ml) per day to Barrow Gurney, using two 60 hp (45 kW) pumps. They began to be run intermittently from May 1867, and were in regular use from July 1868. Simpson did not live to see wells being constructed, as he died in 1869, but work began in the following year, and many wells and boreholes were eventually constructed. Better pumps and steam engines were installed, enabling the station to pump 6 million imperial gallons (27 Ml) per day. The original pumps were scrapped in 1937.

=== Development ===
Bristol Waterworks Act 1939
- Act of Parliament
- Parliament of the United Kingdom
- Long title: An Act to authorise the Bristol Waterworks Company to construct new works and to raise additional capital and for other purposes.
- Citation: 2 & 3 Geo. 6. c. lxxxi

Dates
- Royal assent: 28 July 1939

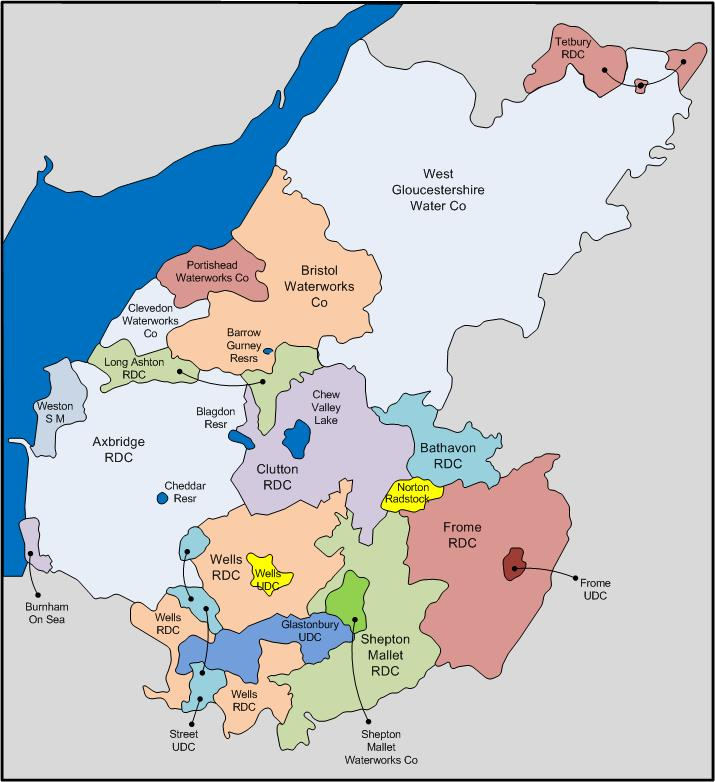
Water providers that amalgamated with Bristol Water (1952-1964)

Women were first employed at Bristol Waterworks during the First World War. By April 1942 female staff had entirely replaced men on night telephone duty.

Years of planning and design work for the Chew Valley Lake Scheme as a reservoir for the city culminated in the obtaining of the Bristol Waterworks Act 1939 (2 & 3 Geo. 6. c. lxxxi) on 28 July 1939. It was the largest and most expensive project in the company's history, but less than two months later, the Second World War began, and all capital work was suspended until it was over. The first sod was cut on 10 July 1946, as part of the centenary celebrations of the company. The temporary intake, pumping station and link to the line of works had been authorised in 1944 during a severe drought, although the full scheme as described in the 1939 act would not receive permission to proceed until 1948. Queen Elizabeth II inaugurated Chew Valley Lake on 17 April 1956, accompanied by the Duke of Edinburgh. On 24 November 1940 the Bristol Blitz caused 95 fractured water mains in the city but by 28 November the water system in the city was restored to normal.

Bristol Waterworks (Axbridge) Order 1958
- Statutory Instrument
- Parliament of the United Kingdom
- Citation: SI 1958/553

Dates
- Commencement: 1 April 1958
Other legislation
Made under	Water Act 1945

During the 1950s and 1960s, the area supplied by Bristol Waterworks increased steadily. Portishead District Water Company was taken over on 1 January 1952, Long Ashton Rural District Council (RDC) followed on 1 April 1952 and Clevedon Water Company on 1 January 1953. These acquisitions meant that they were supplying an area of 123 square miles (320 km^{2}). The company agreed to supply water in bulk to a number of smaller water supply undertakings, and based on the fact that Chew Valley Lake would soon be completed, agreed to supply a total of 1.5 million imperial gallons (6.8 Ml) per day to Weston-super-Mare Urban District Council (UDC), Clutton RDC, Norton Radstock UDC and Wells RDC. Discussions on amalgamation with West Gloucester Waterworks Company had begun in 1955, but on 26 September 1956, the Ministry of Housing and Local Government published a circular suggesting that the existing water supply undertakings in the country, then numbering over 1,000, should be radically reduced. Amalgamation with West Gloucester was agreed, and most of the 16 water supply undertakings in the Mendip Hills started negotiating with Bristol Waterworks. In 1957, agreements for takeover were concluded with Axbridge RDC (approved by the Bristol Waterworks (Axbridge) Order 1958 (SI 1958/553)), Shepton Mallet Waterworks Company and Glastonbury Corporation, and discussions with five other undertakings were well advanced.

Actual amalgamations took place on 1 January 1959 with Shepton Mallet Waterworks Company, who had just celebrated their centenary on 12 December 1958, with Glastonbury Corporation on 1 April 1959, with West Gloucestershire Water Company on 1 July 1959 and with Wells RDC on 1 October 1959. This resulted in the company supply a population of 680,000, spread over an area of 647 square miles (1,680 km^{2}). The water supply undertakings run by Clutton RDC and Shepton Mallet RDC were taken over on 1 April 1960, with Weston-super-Mare following on 1 October 1960. The population supplied increased to 802,000 over an area of 815 square miles (2,110 km^{2}) with the takeover of Tetbury RDC and Wells City waterworks on 1 April 1961. Further expansion took place on 1 April 1962, when Frome RDC was taken over, and the undertakings of Frome UDC, Street UDC and Burnham-on-Sea UDC following on 1 October. Bathavon Rural District was taken over on 1 April 1963, and the final major takeover was of Norton Radstock UDC on 1 April 1964, increasing the area of supply to 934 square miles (2,420 km^{2}), subsequently reduced to 923 square miles (2,390 km^{2}) as a result of some minor changes.

The severe winter of 1962 caused 668 burst mains across the company's supply area in 76 days. Water had to be carted through the streets of Bristol to try and meet demand. In April 1963 a reception at the Council House thanked staff, contractors, drivers and volunteers who had helped.

The Bristol Waterworks Company (Constitution and Regulation) Order 1991 (SI 1991/2313) allowed the statutory Bristol Waterworks Company to register as The Bristol Waterworks plc in November 1991. One month later, the company changed its name again, this time to Bristol Water plc.

On 5 October 2011, a subsidiary of Capstone Infrastructure Corporation acquired a 70% interest in Bristol Water from Grupo Agbar, who retained a 30% interest in the company. On 10 May 2012, a subsidiary of Itochu Corporation acquired a 20% indirect interest in Bristol Water. Today, iCON Infrastructure have agreed to acquire a 30 percent stake in Bristol Water from Suez, bringing the 10-year relationship with Agbar (now part of Suez) to a natural end, following the takeover in 2006 and the sale of a 70 percent stake in 2011. In 2018, Bristol Water was owned by iCON Infrastructure Partners III, L.P. (50 percent), iCON Infrastructure Partners III (Bristol), L.P. (30 percent) and Itochu Corporation (20 percent) and is a plc with company number 02662226. Bristol Water is one of very few water companies in the UK that has remained in private ownership since its inception.

=== Predecessors ===
==== Portishead District Water Company ====
The Portishead District Water Company was originally formed as the Portishead District Waterworks Company (Limited) in 1874 under the Companies Act 1862, then reincorporated as a statutory water company by the Portishead District Water Act 1875 (38 & 39 Vict. c. lxxxiii).

==== Clevedon Water Company ====
The Clevedon Water Company was incorporated by the Clevedon Water Act 1909 (9 Edw. 7. c. xxv).

==== West Gloucester Waterworks Company ====
The West Gloucestershire Water Company was incorporated by the West Gloucestershire Water Act 1884 (47 & 48 Vict. c. ccxlix).

==== Shepton Mallet Waterworks Company ====
The Shepton Mallet Waterworks Company was incorporated by the Shepton Mallet Waterworks Act 1859 (22 Vict. c. i).

== Archives ==
Records of Bristol Waterworks Company and Bristol Water are held at Bristol Archives (Ref. 40619) (online catalogue). Further records are held at The National Archives (United Kingdom).

== Bibliography ==
- Binnie, G M (1981). Early Victorian Water Engineers. Thomas Telford. ISBN 978-0-7277-0128-2.
- Hodgson, Alan (1991). The story of the Bristol Waterworks Company 1939-1991. Bristol Waterworks Co.
- Jones, Frederick C (1993). The Bristol Waterworks Company 1846-1946 (3rd ed.). St Stephen’s Bristol Press.
