= Cheddar Reservoir =

Reservoir in Somerset, England

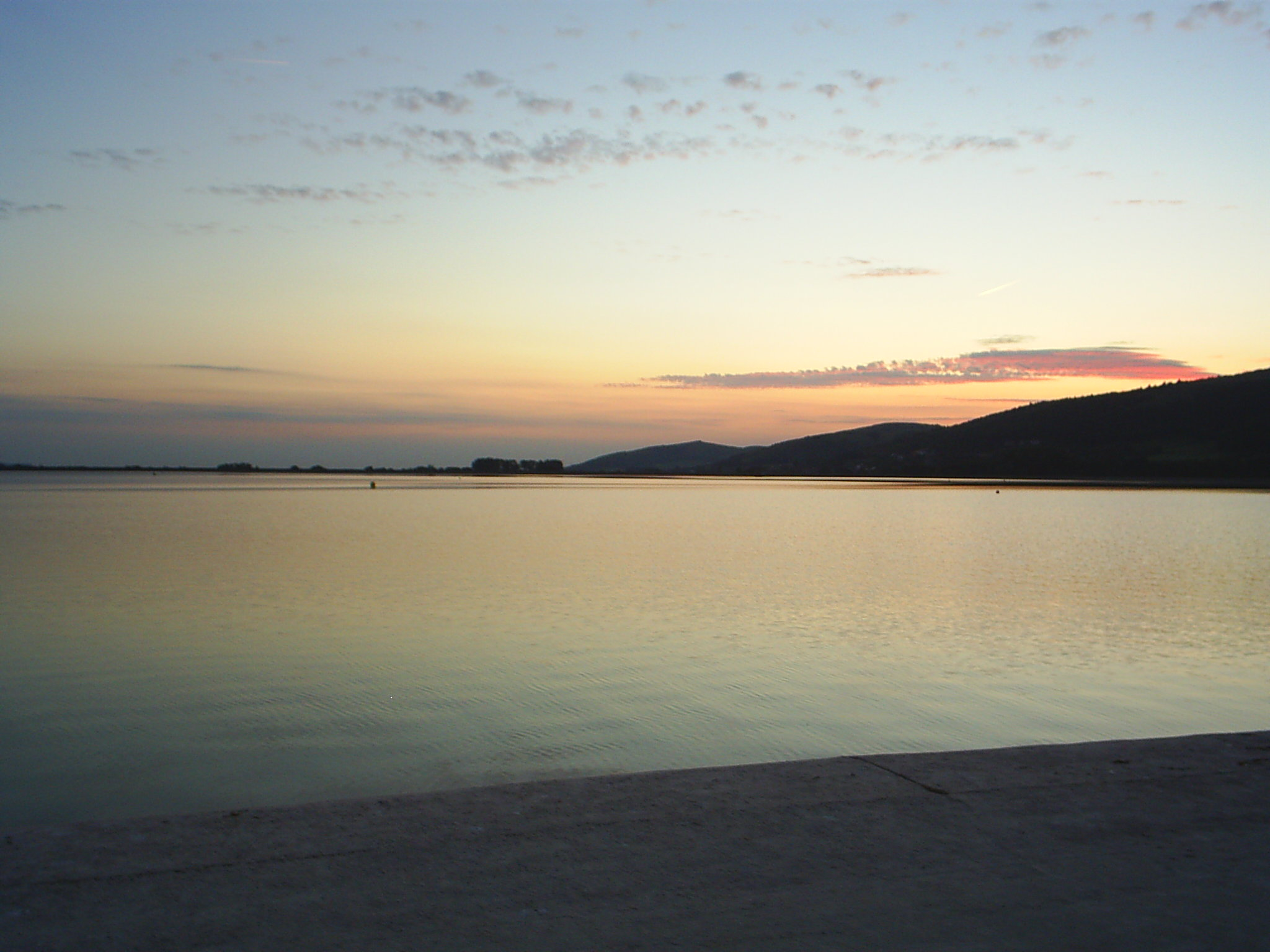
- at dusk looking towards the western edge of the Mendip Hills and Crook Peak

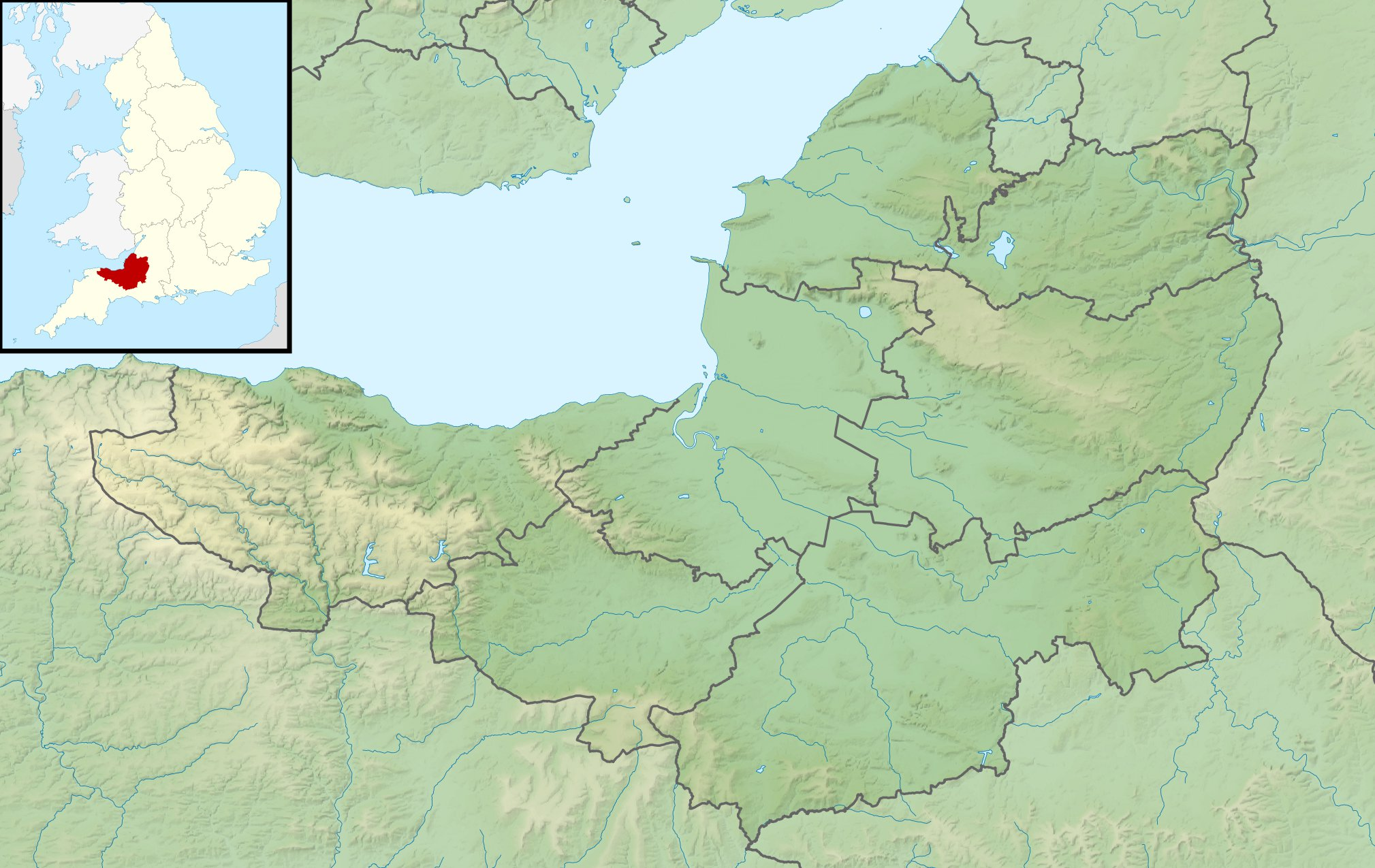
- Location within Somerset
- Location: Somerset
- Coordinates: 51°16′50″N 2°48′5″W
- Type: reservoir
- Primary inflows: inlet from Cheddar Yeo
- Basin countries: United Kingdom
- Surface area: 105.4 ha (260 acres)

Cheddar Reservoir
- Site of Special Scientific Interest
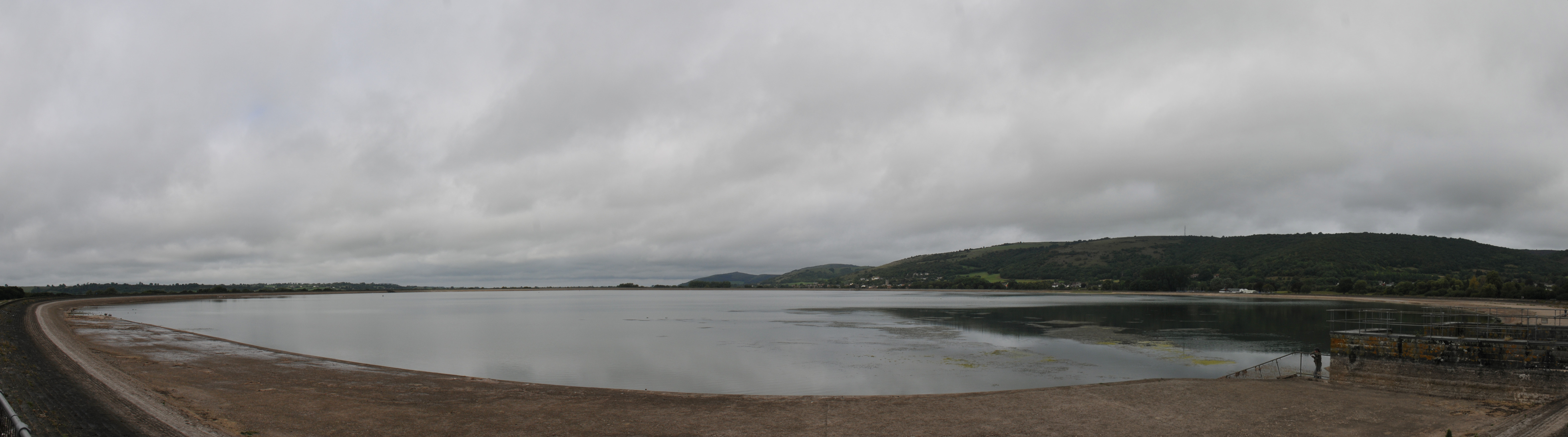

- Location within Somerset
- Location of Cheddar Reservoir.
- Area of search: Somerset
- Grid reference: ST441537
- Coordinates: 51.2806°N 2.8014°W
- Interest: Biological
- Area: 105.4 hectares (1.054 km^{2}; 0.407 sq mi)
- Notification date: 1972

Cheddar Reservoir is an artificial reservoir in Somerset, England, operated by Bristol Water. Dating from the 1930s it has a capacity of 135 million gallons (613,700 cubic metres). The reservoir is supplied with water taken from the Cheddar Yeo river in Cheddar Gorge. The inlet grate for the 54 inches (1.4 m) water pipe that is used to transport the water can be seen immediately upstream from the sensory garden in Cheddar Gorge. It lies to the west of the village of Cheddar and south east of the town of Axbridge. Because of this it is sometimes known as Axbridge Reservoir. It is roughly circular in shape, and surrounded by large earth banks which are grazed by sheep. A public footpath circles the perimeter of the reservoir, the length of a circuit being approximately 2.25 miles.

== History ==
The reservoir was built by Sir Robert McAlpine and completed in 1937. It was the first British reservoir to permit sailing.

== Description ==
The reservoir has been designated as a Site of Special Scientific Interest (Ref No:1003948) due to its wintering waterfowl populations. Two car parks give access to the reservoir; one is at the Axbridge end, and on the eastern side, accessible from Cheddar. Two water towers are present, one at the Cheddar end, and one at the Axbridge end. Bristol Corinthians sailing club is situated at its northern end. Other recreational activities at the reservoir include windsurfing, angling (for pike, tench, roach, perch and eels), and birdwatching.

== Bird life ==
The reservoir, which has an area of 105.4 hectares (260 acres), is attractive to waterbirds, in particular wintering wildfowl and gulls.

Wildfowl present regularly in winter include mallard (Anas platyrhynchos), gadwall (Anas strepera), tufted duck (Aythya fuligula), common pochard (Aythya ferina), Eurasian wigeon (Anas penelope), common goldeneye (Bucephala clangula) and goosander (Mergus merganser). A large flock of coot (Fulica atra) is present, and great crested grebe (Podiceps cristatus) are also numerous.

Because of its proximity to the Bristol Channel, storm-blown seabirds are occasionally found here, including shag, grey phalarope, divers and grebes.

A moderately sized gull roost has attracted glaucous, Iceland and ring-billed gulls on multiple occasions.

A number of rare and scarce vagrant birds have been seen at Cheddar Reservoir, mainly waterfowl and shorebirds. Up to 2004 the following species had occurred:

- American wigeon
- Green-winged teal
- Ring-necked duck
- Ferruginous duck
- Black-winged stilt
- Kentish plover
- American golden plover
- Temminck's stint
- White-rumped sandpiper
- Pectoral sandpiper
- Buff-breasted sandpiper
- Marsh sandpiper
- Wilson's phalarope
- Red-necked phalarope
- Franklin's gull
- Whiskered tern
- White-winged black tern
- Richard's pipit
- Tawny pipit
- Common rosefinch
- Ortolan bunting

== Proposals for a second reservoir ==
Bristol Water has long identified Cheddar as the site for a new reservoir. In 2007 it announced that the new reservoir would be one of the options considered in its Draft 2009 Water Resources Plan. The new reservoir would hold 600,000 cubic meters, roughly the same size as the existing reservoir, which it would be based alongside.

In October 2012 survey work started on the new reservoir to the south of the existing one, with a planning application scheduled for December 2013.

In 2018 it was announced that the plans for the second reservoir had been scrapped.
