= Stanton Drew =

Village in Somerset, England

Coordinates: 51.3663°N 2.5782°W

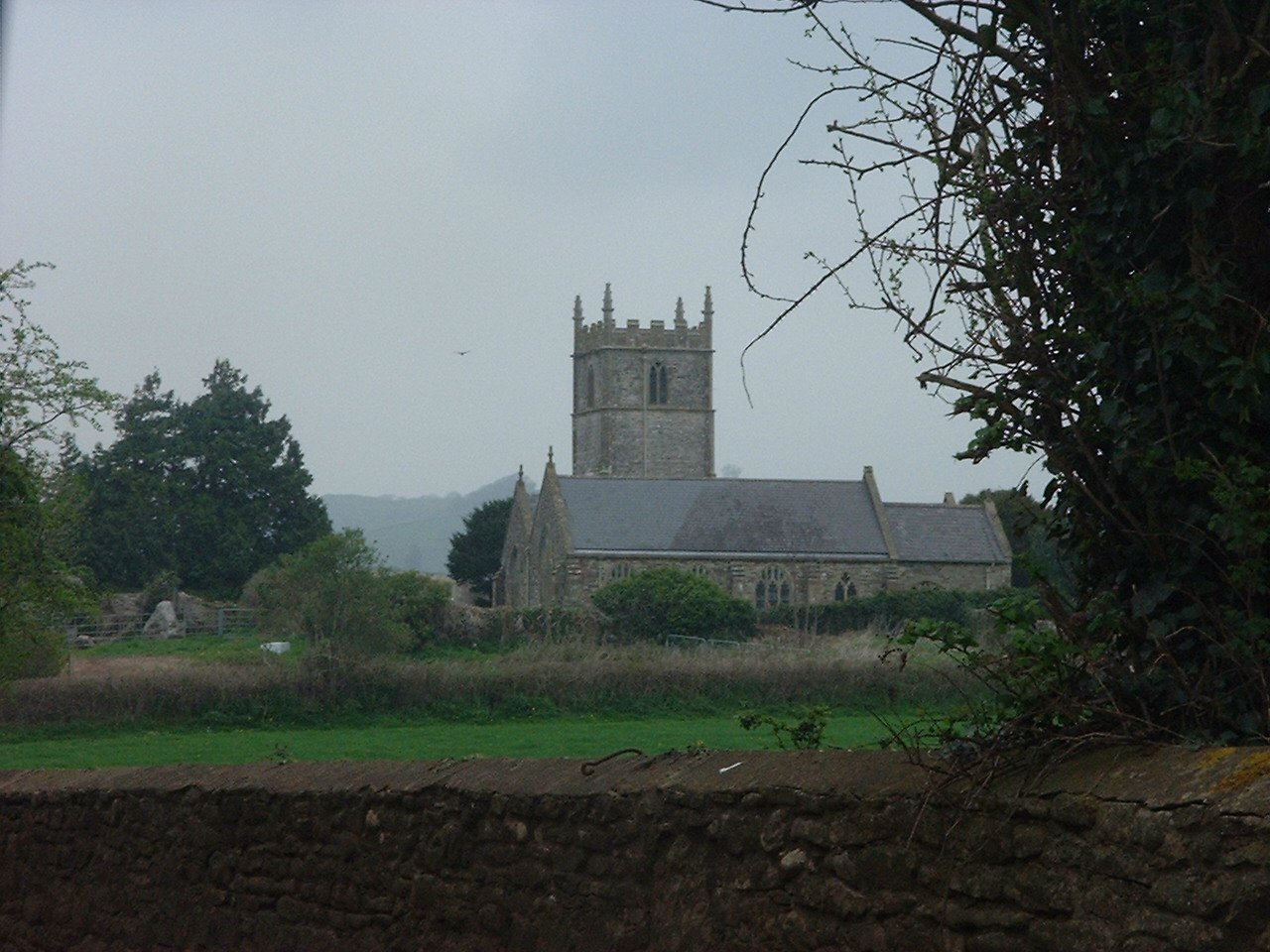
- St Mary the Virgin Church at Stanton Drew

- Location within Somerset
- Population: 787 (2011)
- OS grid reference: ST597632
- Unitary authority: Bath and North East Somerset
- Ceremonial county: Somerset
- Region: South West
- Country: England
- Sovereign state: United Kingdom
- Post town: BRISTOL
- Postcode district: BS39
- Dialling code: 01275
- Police: Avon and Somerset
- Fire: Avon
- Ambulance: South Western
- UK Parliament: North East Somerset and Hanham

Stanton Drew is a small village and civil parish within the Chew Valley in Somerset, England, lying north of the Mendip Hills, 8 miles (13 km) south of Bristol, just off the A368 between Chelwood and Bishop Sutton in the area of the Bath and North East Somerset unitary authority.

Just outside the village are the prehistoric Stanton Drew stone circles. The largest of these, the Great Circle, is a henge monument and the second largest stone circle in Britain, after Avebury. The circle is 113 m in diameter and probably consisted of 30 stones, of which 27 survive today.

The village has a range of listed buildings, dating from the 13th to 15th centuries, including the church of St Mary the Virgin, the Round House (Old Toll House) and several farmhouses.

The parish of Stanton Drew, which includes the hamlet of Stanton Wick, had a population of 787 in 2011. Until 1947 the parish also included Belluton and part of Pensford. It has a primary school, pubs (the Druids Arms and the Carpenters Arms at Stanton Wick), a church and a village hall, which is the venue for various village activities. The area around the village has several dairy and arable farms on neutral to acid red loamy soils with slowly permeable subsoils. It is also a dormitory village for people working in Bath and Bristol.

== History ==
Stanton Drew was listed in the Domesday Book of 1086 as Stantone. The first element is clearly a direct reference to the megalithic monument, which may well have been in far better condition over 1,000 years ago than it is today, and would have made a most striking impression on the first English speakers to arrive in this area, probably in the second half of the 7th century. In terms of the second element of the main place-name, it is Old English tun, the single commonest place-name forming word in Old English. This word has numerous possible meanings, depending on context and/or region. But in the majority of cases a meaning of 'settlement/farmstead/estate', will not be wide of the mark. The second part of the place-name (i.e. the second, separate word as it appears in modern forms) is a 'standard' manorial suffix from the post-Norman Conquest period. An earlier suggestion on this page that this component of the place-name is based on a pre-English (i.e. British) word, is entirely false, and was based on a notoriously unreliable source. It is in fact derived from the name of a manorial tenant, Drogo, with the individual himself being mentioned in 1225. Although the form in which we have the name is Anglo-Norman French, Professor Coates remarks that it is "of Continental Germanic origin, from one of two roots meaning 'go to war' or 'ghost'".

After the Norman Conquest the Lords of the Manor took their name from the village. In the reign of Henry II Robert de Stanton was succeeded by Geoffrey de Stanton. One of the family Drogo or Drew gave his name to the place to distinguish it from Stanton Prior and Stanton Wick. It subsequently came into the possession of the Choke and then the Cooper and Coates families.

The parish of Stanton Drew was part of the Keynsham Hundred.

=== Coal mining ===
There is a long history of coal mining in the parish and the locations of many small pits are still visible in newly ploughed fields. For example, the philosopher John Locke who grew up in Belluton owned land in the parish which was being exploited for coal in 1680.

During the 19th and 20th centuries there were three coal mines within the parish. The Rydons mine operated from 1808 until 1833, the Pensford Colliery operated from 1909 to 1955 and the Bromley Pit operated from 1860 - 1957. These mines formed part of the northern section of the Somerset coalfield.

== Governance ==
The parish council has responsibility for local issues, including setting an annual precept (local rate) to cover the council's operating costs and producing annual accounts for public scrutiny. The parish council evaluates local planning applications and works with the local police, district council officers, and neighbourhood watch groups on matters of crime, security, and traffic. The parish council's role also includes initiating projects for the maintenance and repair of parish facilities, such as the village hall or community centre, playing fields and playgrounds, as well as consulting with the district council on the maintenance, repair, and improvement of highways, drainage, footpaths, public transport, and street cleaning. Conservation matters (including trees and listed buildings) and environmental issues are also of interest to the council.

Along with Chelwood and Clutton, Stanton Drew is part of the Clutton Ward which is represented by one councillor on the unitary authority of Bath and North East Somerset which was created in 1996, as established by the Local Government Act 1992. It provides a single tier of local government with responsibility for almost all local government functions within its area including local planning and building control, local roads, council housing, environmental health, markets and fairs, refuse collection, recycling, cemeteries, crematoria, leisure services, parks, and tourism. It is also responsible for education, social services, libraries, main roads, public transport, Trading Standards, waste disposal and strategic planning, although fire, police and ambulance services are provided jointly with other authorities through the Avon Fire and Rescue Service, Avon and Somerset Constabulary and the Great Western Ambulance Service.

Bath and North East Somerset's area covers part of the ceremonial county of Somerset but it is administered independently of the non-metropolitan county. Its administrative headquarters is in Bath. Between 1 April 1974 and 1 April 1996, it was the Wansdyke district and the City of Bath of the county of Avon. Before 1974 that the parish was part of the Clutton Rural District.

The parish is represented in the House of Commons of the Parliament of the United Kingdom as part of North East Somerset and Hanham. It elects one Member of Parliament (MP) by the first past the post system of election.

== Demographics ==
According to the 2011 Census, the parish of Stanton Drew, had 787 residents, living in 291 households.

== Landmarks ==
War Memorial The War Memorial situated in the village centre commemorates the serving dead of the village in the two World Wars and was rebuilt in local stone in 2021.

=== Rectory Farmhouse ===
The Rectory Farmhouse is a Grade II* listed building, dating from the 15th century. A barn about 35 metres west of the farmhouse dates from the same period, as does a dovecote in the grounds.

=== The Round House ===
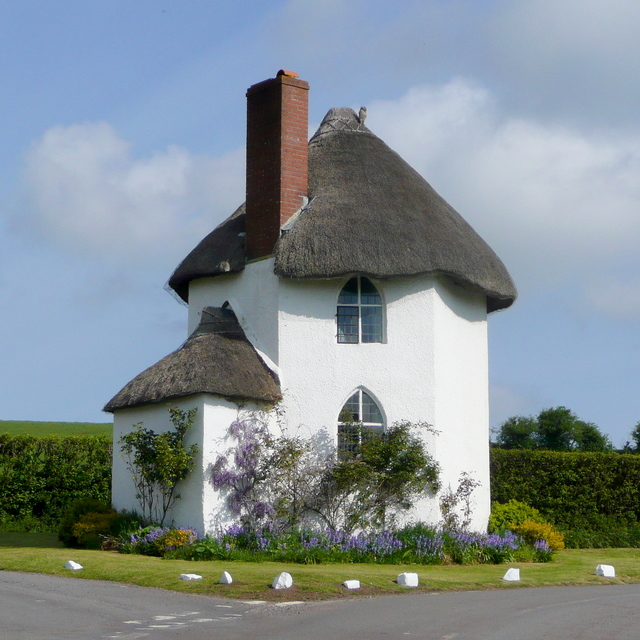
The Round House (Old Toll House) at Stanton Drew

At the northern entrance to the village before the bridge over the River Chew is a white, thatched, late 18th-century building. Although now a private house, it was originally constructed as a toll house serving the West Harptree Turnpike Trust. It is a Grade II listed building. The road configuration around the building was originally completely different than it is today. The Chew Magna tithe map (1840) shows that the toll house was sited so as to deliberately block the main east-west road (now the B3130), and traffic passing along the road, or wishing to turn south from it into Stanton Drew village, would be forced to pass through at least one of two gates originally attached to, respectively, the south-eastern and south-western sides of the turnpike house. Since the building went out of use as a toll house, probably in the mid-1870s, when the West Harptree Trust was abolished, the road layout was reconfigured so that the main road now passes unhindered immediately to the north of the building.

=== The Court ===
The Court in Bromley Road dates from 1753 and is a Grade II* listed building. It is now used as a nursing home. The walls and piers around this property are themselves Grade II listed.

=== Watermill ===
There is some evidence of a watermill, used as a forge in the 1660s, a copper mill from 1713 to 1860 and then a paper mill.

=== Other Grade II listed buildings ===
There are several other listed buildings in the village, the oldest being the 15th-century Church Farmhouse.

Buildings from the 17th century include Byemills Farmhouse, Codrington Cottage, Stanton Wick Farmhouse, Parson's Farmhouse, and another cottage and attached wall near the church.

Later buildings include those from the 19th century such as: Mill Place, and its accompanying wall and piers, Rosedale, and Fern Cottage.

=== Bridge ===
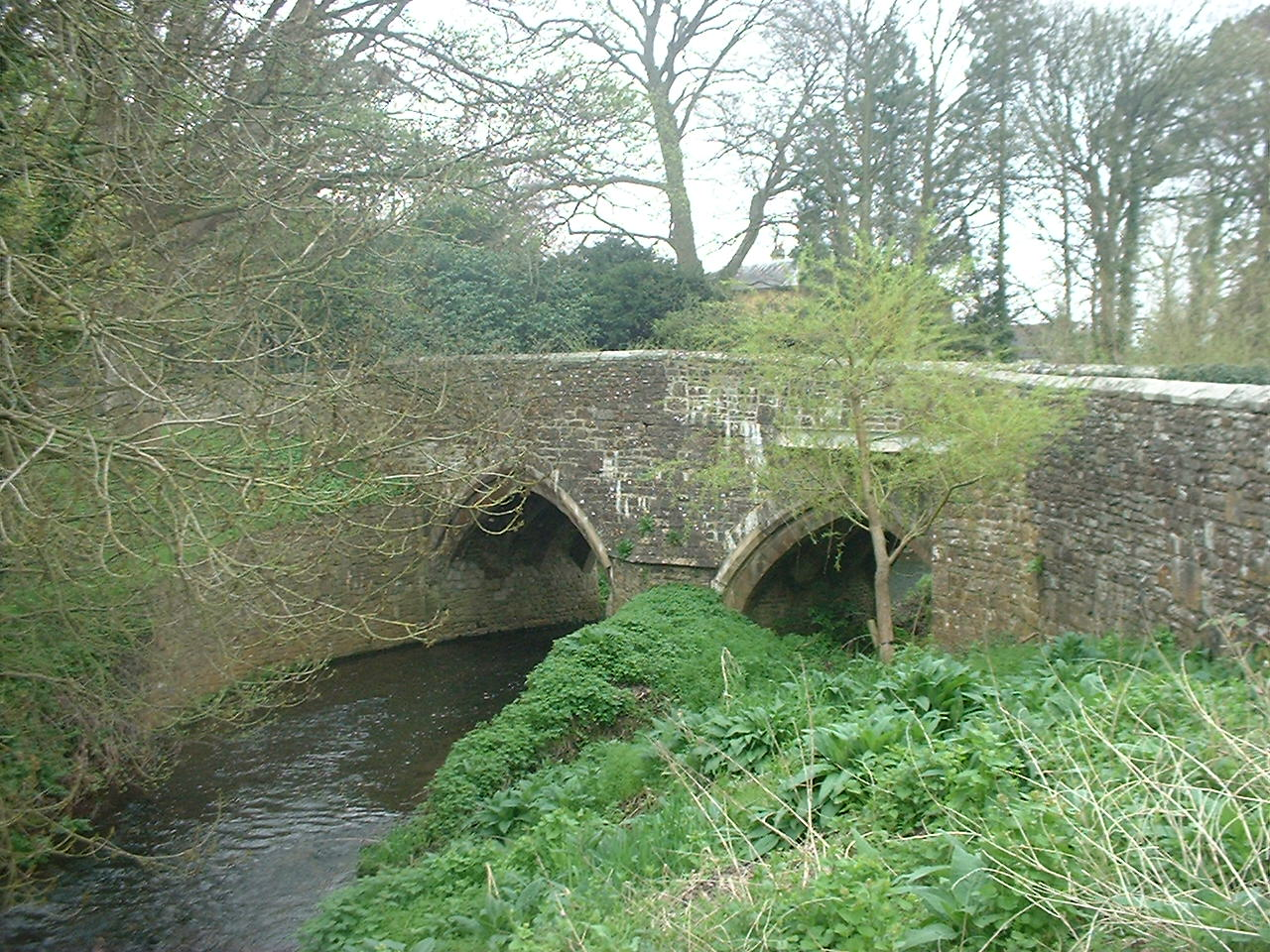
Bridge at Stanton Drew

The narrow limestone bridge over the River Chew is possibly 13th or 14th-century in origin with more recent repairs. The bridge spans about 12 metres (39 ft), with a 1 metre (3.3 ft) high parapet wall to each side. Each side has two pointed arches with chamfered mouldings and relieving arch, central cutwater with off-sets to each side and pyramidal stone top, inner ribs to vaults; on east side, oval plaque with illegible inscription and strengthening with exposed steel girder. Ancient Monument Avon no. 162. The bridge was damaged in the 1968 Chew Stoke flood.

== Religious sites ==
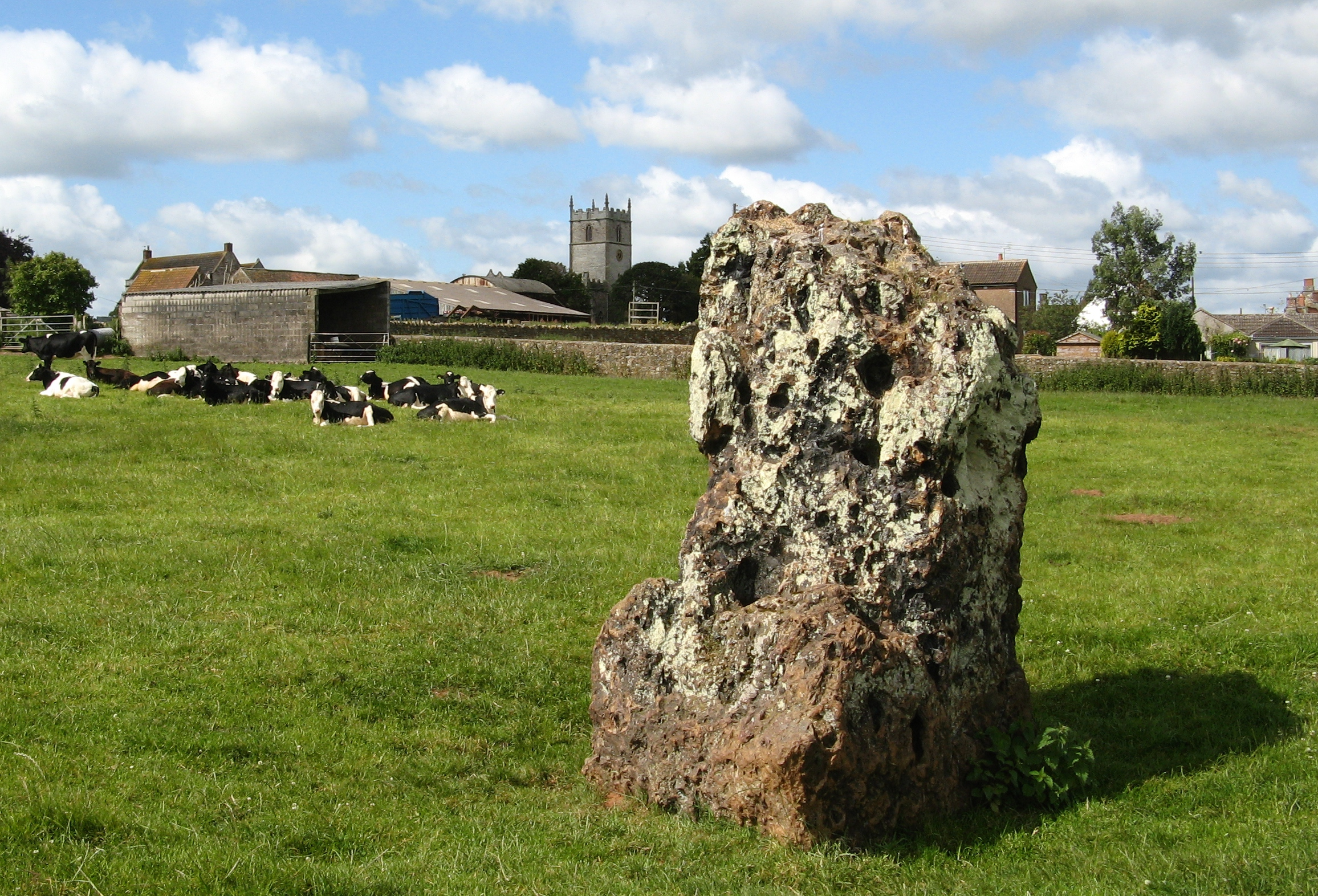
Stone circle with St Mary's church tower in background

The Church of St Mary the Virgin has been a place of Christian worship for at least eight hundred years, and the site itself probably for far longer. The history of the church so far as it is known has been reviewed in an authoritative modern account by John Richards. In the north aisle is the Norman bowl of the font and further east the small turret steps behind a glass door that in earlier times led up into a rood loft. Parts of the building date from the 13th and 14th centuries, but the Norman font demonstrates very clearly the presence of a late 11th or 12th century church, and it is almost certain that this in turn will have been merely a replacement for a late Anglo-Saxon structure probably on the same site - although that earlier church may well have been of timber rather than masonry construction. It is extremely unlikely that an estate of ten hides, which Stanton was at the time of Domesday Book (1086), would not already have had a church by the time of the Norman Conquest. The more so since, in the post-Conquest period, Stanton had a daughter church at Pensford, and to that extent would have been regarded locally as a minor 'mother' church. The interior, as it is seen today, shows much 19th century building and restoration. It is a Grade II* listed building. The Hazle, Wight Preston and several other unidentified monuments in the churchyard are also listed, along with the piers, gates and overthrow at the north-east entrance to churchyard.

== Popular culture ==
Stanton Drew was commemorated by Adge Cutler in his popular song "When the Common Market Comes to Stanton Drew". Written in response to opening up of trade with Europe, Adge suggests what might happen to Somerset culture when Europeans come over.

The Dancers of Stanton Drew is a song written by Jim Parker and Muriel Holland and performed by The Yetties, amongst others. It tells the story of Sue and William being turned to stone after dancing on a Sunday in Stanton Drew.

"Stanton Drew in the County of Somerset

That's where the Devil played at Sue's request

They paid the price for dancing on a Sunday

Ever as stones they stand at rest"
