= Chelwood =

Village and civil parish in Somerset, England

Coordinates: 51.3549°N 2.5249°W

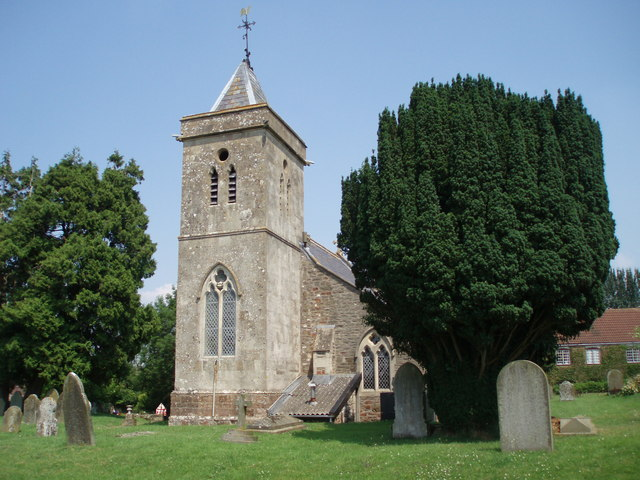
- St Leonard's church, Chelwood

- Location within Somerset
- Population: 148
- OS grid reference: ST634619
- Unitary authority: Bath and North East Somerset
- Ceremonial county: Somerset
- Region: South West
- Country: England
- Sovereign state: United Kingdom
- Post town: BRISTOL
- Postcode district: BS39
- Dialling code: 01761
- Police: Avon and Somerset
- Fire: Avon
- Ambulance: South Western
- UK Parliament: North East Somerset and Hanham

Chelwood is a small village and civil parish in Somerset, England, and is in the Chew Valley in the Bath and North East Somerset council area, about 8 miles (13 km) from Bristol and Bath. The parish, which includes the hamlets of West Chelwood and Breach, has a population of 148. It is situated on the A368 (Bath to Weston-super-Mare road), very close to the A37.

== History ==
The first mention of Chelwood dates from 925 when Robert le Bok, a native of Chelwood, was tried and acquitted of attempting to burn down the house of John de Kylkenny. According to Robinson there are two entries in the 1086 Domesday Book: Cellwert and Celeworde both indicating the same meaning, "the hill farm" from the Old English ceol and wor. Although spellings varied down the years, the first attested use of the form "Chelwood" dates from the 12th century.

The parish of Chelwood was part of the Keynsham Hundred.

The village formed part of two holdings, known as East and West Chelwood. Both sides along with Breach were originally owned by the Earl of Warwick's estate, but East Chelwood passed to the Popham family of the nearby Hunstrete House, where it remained into the early 20th century. Chelwood is one of the nine Thankful Villages in Somerset where all the men returned from the First World War; four went and four returned. The village is featured on Darren Hayman's album, Thankful Villages Volume 1.

== Governance ==
The parish council has responsibility for local issues, including setting an annual precept (local rate) to cover the council's operating costs and producing annual accounts for public scrutiny. The parish council evaluates local planning applications and works with the local police, district council officers, and neighbourhood watch groups on matters of crime, security, and traffic. The parish council's role also includes initiating projects for the maintenance and repair of parish facilities, such as the village hall or community centre, playing fields and playgrounds, as well as consulting with the district council on the maintenance, repair, and improvement of highways, drainage, footpaths, public transport, and street cleaning. Conservation matters (including trees and listed buildings) and environmental issues are also of interest to the council.

Along with Stanton Drew and Clutton, Chelwood is part of the Clutton Ward, which is represented by one councillor on the unitary authority of Bath and North East Somerset which was created in 1996, as established by the Local Government Act 1992. It provides a single tier of local government with responsibility for almost all local government functions within its area including local planning and building control, local roads, council housing, environmental health, markets and fairs, refuse collection, recycling, cemeteries, crematoria, leisure services, parks, and tourism. It is also responsible for education, social services, libraries, main roads, public transport, Trading Standards, waste disposal and strategic planning, although fire, police and ambulance services are provided jointly with other authorities through the Avon Fire and Rescue Service, Avon and Somerset Constabulary and the Great Western Ambulance Service.

Bath and North East Somerset's area covers part of the ceremonial county of Somerset but it is administered independently of the non-metropolitan county. Its administrative headquarters is in Bath. Between 1 April 1974 and 1 April 1996, it was the Wansdyke district and the City of Bath of the county of Avon. Before 1974 that the parish was part of the Clutton Rural District.

The parish is represented in the House of Commons of the Parliament of the United Kingdom as part of North East Somerset and Hanham. It elects one Member of Parliament (MP) by the first past the post system of election. It was also part of the South West England constituency of the European Parliament prior to Britain leaving the European Union in January 2020, which elected seven MEPs using the d'Hondt method of party-list proportional representation.

== Demographics ==
According to the 2001 Census, the Clutton Ward (which includes Stanton Drew and Clutton), had 1,290 residents, living in 483 households, with an average age of 40.3 years. Of these 72% of residents describing their health as "good", 22% of 16- to 74-year-olds had no qualifications; and the area had an unemployment rate of 2.2% of all economically active people aged 16–74. In the Index of Multiple Deprivation 2004, it was ranked at 24,527 out of 32,482 wards in England, where 1 was the most deprived LSOA and 32,482 the least deprived.

== Landmarks ==
Chelwood House was built in the valley of the river Chew in 1681 as a Dower house, and sits in 1.3-acre (5,300 m^{2}) gardens. The property is a Grade II listed building.

Chelwood includes several other Grade II listed buildings:

- Church Farmhouse
- Malt House Farmhouse
- Old School House
- Park Farmhouse
- Wall and railings about 5 metres north-east of Old School House
- Withydale and attached house

== Religious sites ==
St Leonard's church was nearly all built around 1850, but two corbel-heads of the nave arcade are said to be 13th-century. The font is Norman with tiny volutes at the edges and a top frieze of something like lambrequins. The stained glass has various 16th-century Flemish pieces in the south aisle window. The tower contains a bell dating from 1773 and made by Abraham Bilbie of the Bilbie family. It has been designated by Historic England as a Grade II* listed building. The church has been redundant since March 2020.
