= Compton Martin =

Village and civil parish in England

Coordinates: 51.3102°N 2.6521°W

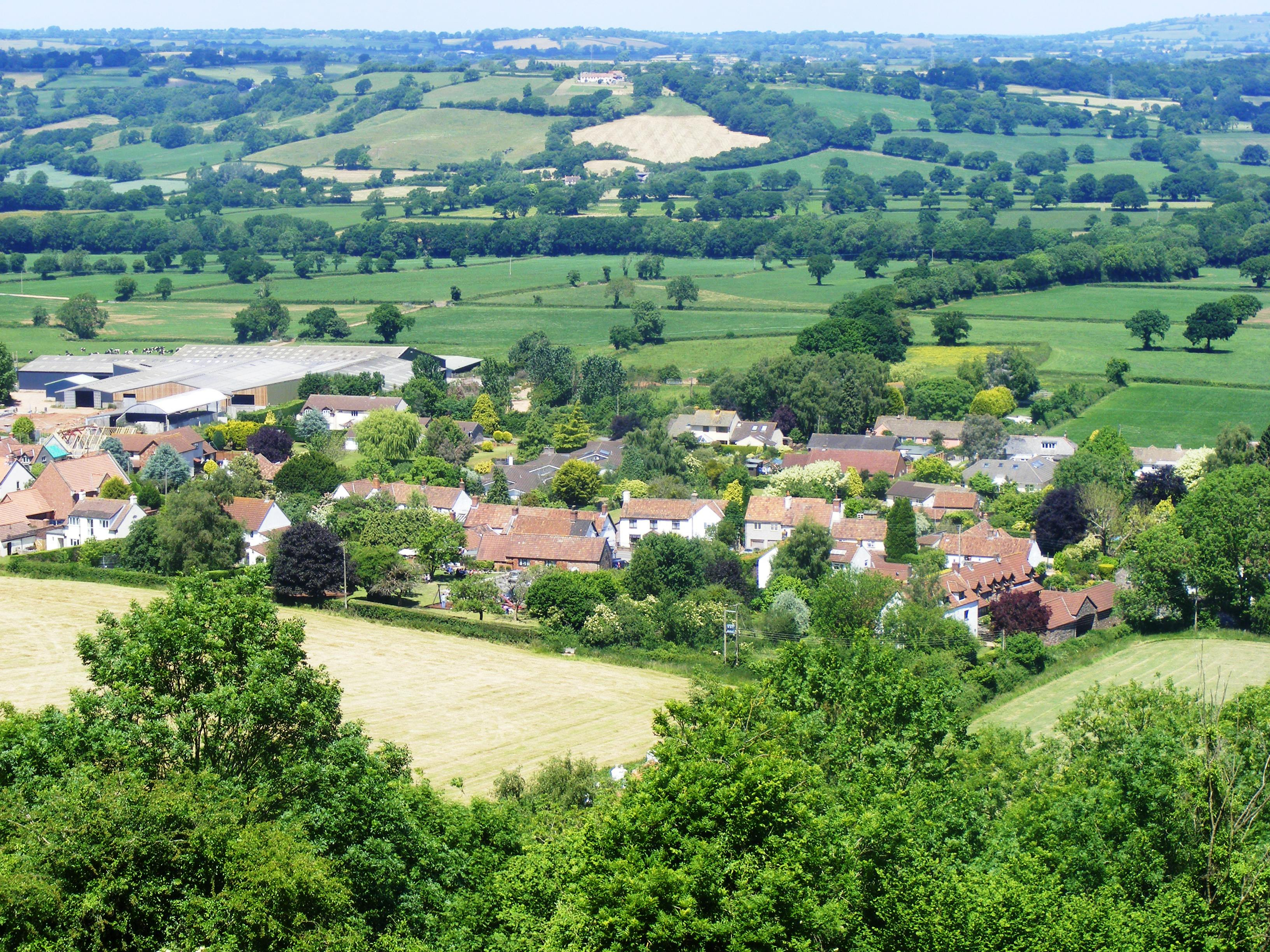

- Location within Somerset
- Population: 508 (2011)
- OS grid reference: ST545570
- Unitary authority: Bath and North East Somerset
- Ceremonial county: Somerset
- Region: South West
- Country: England
- Sovereign state: United Kingdom
- Post town: BRISTOL
- Postcode district: BS40
- Dialling code: 01761
- Police: Avon and Somerset
- Fire: Avon
- Ambulance: South Western
- UK Parliament: North East Somerset and Hanham

Compton Martin is a small village and civil parish within the Chew Valley in Somerset and in the Bath and North East Somerset unitary authority in England. The parish has a population of 508. It lies between Chew Valley Lake and Blagdon Lake, north of the Mendip Hills, approximately 10 miles (16 km) south of Bristol on the A368 road Weston-super-Mare to Bath.

A spring rises near the church and feeds the village duck pond, which used to power a paper mill, and ultimately becomes the River Yeo.

The Big Green Gathering takes place at Fernhill Farm above the village.

== History ==
There is evidence of habitation of the area from prehistoric times and the Romans mined lead in the local hill.

According to Robinson it is listed in the 1086 Domesday Book as Comtona.

The Manor of Compton was given by William the Conqueror to Serlo de Burci. In the reign of Henry I of England it passed to his grandson, Robert fitz Martin, who gave the village the latter half of its name.

The parish was part of the hundred of Chewton.

In the 14th century, the Manor passed to the Wake family. Alice, wife of Ralph de Wake, was tried and sentenced to be burned for the murder of her husband. Perhaps she is the inspiration for the legendary White Lady, a ghostly figure said to haunt the parish.

Compton Martin was the birthplace of Saint Wulfric (1080–1154), hermit and miracle worker.

Around 1500, teazle farming for use in the weaving of cloth became a major local industry.

In 1770, a new whipping post was installed by the pond for corporal punishment for minor offences such as petty larceny, vagrancy or absence from church.

The organ at Frenchay Unitarian Church came from the former Compton Martin Methodist Church in 1980.

On 14 March 1944, during World War II a United States Navy Consolidated B-24 Liberator bomber crashed near the village with the loss of five lives.

In August 2010, the village had a surprise visit and performance by singer Kylie Minogue at the Ring O’Bells pub.

In 2018, farmland near Compton Martin was used as a filming location for the 2018 comedy film The Festival starring Joe Thomas, Noel Fielding and Jemaine Clement.

Compton Martin Ochre Mine is a Site of Special Scientific Interest (SSSI).

== Governance ==
The parish council has responsibility for local issues, including setting an annual precept (local rate) to cover the council's operating costs and producing annual accounts for public scrutiny. The parish council evaluates local planning applications and works with the local police, district council officers, and neighbourhood watch groups on matters of crime, security, and traffic. The parish council's role also includes initiating projects for the maintenance and repair of parish facilities, such as the village hall or community centre, playing fields and playgrounds, as well as consulting with the district council on the maintenance, repair, and improvement of highways, drainage, footpaths, public transport, and street-cleaning. Conservation matters (including trees and listed buildings) and environmental issues are also of interest to the council.

Compton Martin is part of the Chew Valley South Ward, which is represented by one councillor on the unitary authority of Bath and North East Somerset which was created in 1996, as established by the Local Government Act 1992. It provides a single tier of local government with responsibility for almost all local government functions within its area including local planning and building control, local roads, council housing, environmental health, markets and fairs, refuse collection, recycling, cemeteries, crematoria, leisure services, parks, and tourism. It is also responsible for education, social services, libraries, main roads, public transport, trading standards, waste disposal and strategic planning, although fire, police and ambulance services are provided jointly with other authorities through the Avon Fire and Rescue Service, Avon and Somerset Constabulary and the Great Western Ambulance Service.

Bath and North East Somerset's area covers part of the ceremonial county of Somerset but it is administered independently of the non-metropolitan county. Its administrative headquarters is in Bath. Between 1 April 1974 and 1 April 1996, it was the Wansdyke district and the City of Bath of the county of Avon. Before 1974 that the parish was part of Clutton Rural District.

The parish is represented in the House of Commons of the Parliament of the United Kingdom as part of North East Somerset and Hanham. It elects one Member of Parliament (MP) by the first past the post system of election. It was also part of the South West England constituency of the European Parliament, prior to Britain leaving the European Union in January 2020, which elected six MEPs using the d'Hondt method of party-list proportional representation.

== Demographics ==
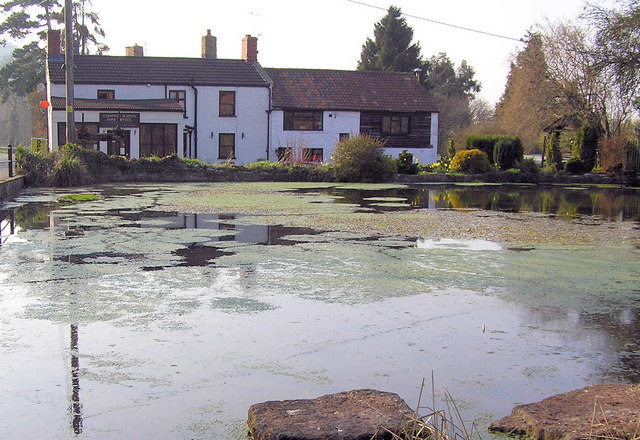
Compton Martin duck pond

According to the 2001 Census, the Chew Valley South Ward (which includes Nempnett Thrubwell), had 1,032 residents, living in 411 households, with an average age of 42.1 years. Of these 74% of residents describing their health as 'good', 20% of 16- to 74-year-olds had no qualifications; and the area had an unemployment rate of 1.7% of all economically active people aged 16–74. In the Index of Multiple Deprivation 2004, it was ranked at 22,950 out of 32,482 wards in England, where 1 was the most deprived LSOA and 32,482 the least deprived.

== Church of St Michael the Archangel ==
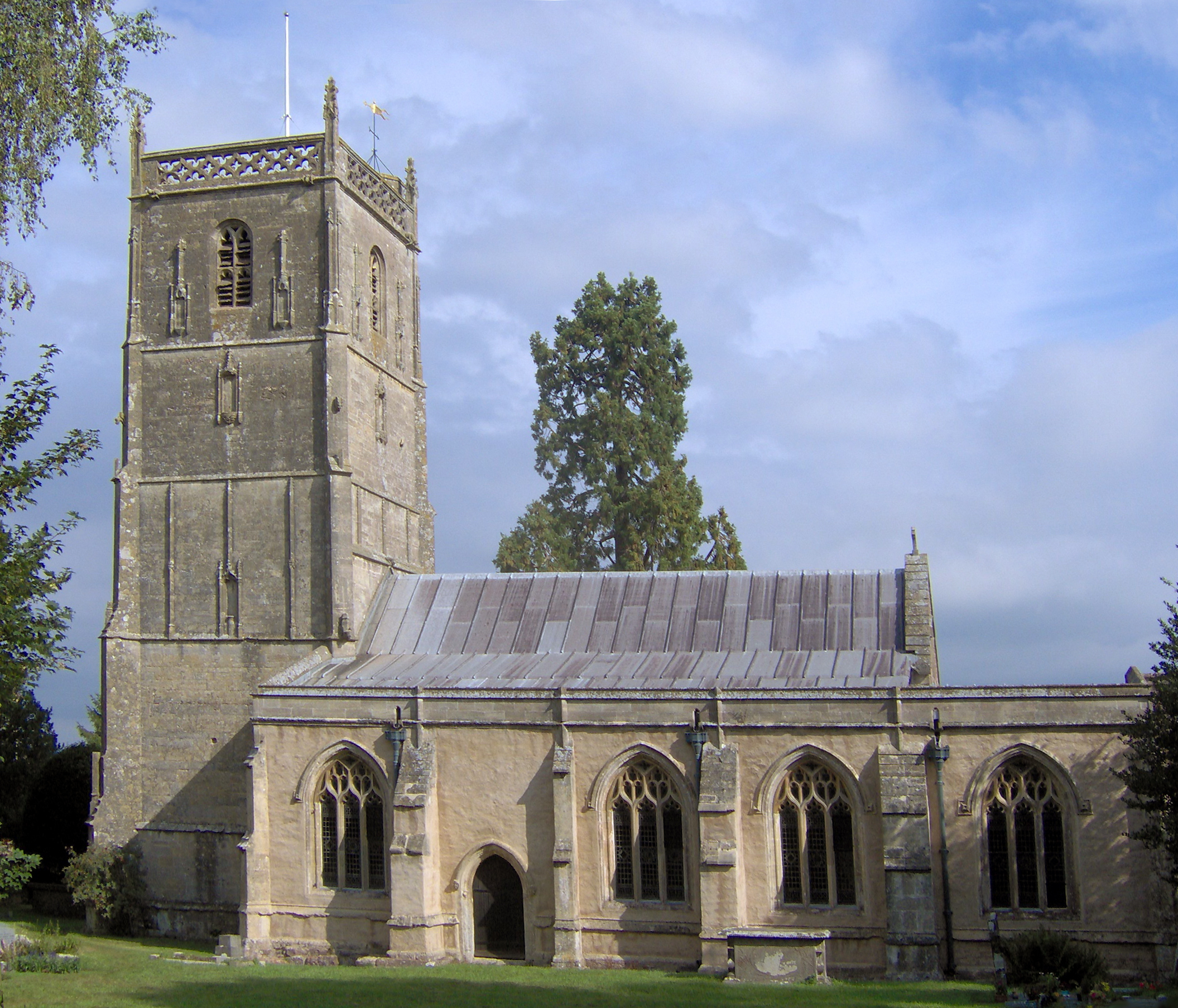
Church of St Michael the Archangel, Compton Martin

The church, which was built in the Norman period, is dedicated to St Michael the Archangel. Norman vaulting can be seen in the chancel and Jacobean work in choir stalls and organ screen. The tower is approached from the nave via a lofty Tudor panelled arch which together with the tower itself dates from the early 16th century. It is some 70 feet (21 m) high and contains six 18th-century bells, five of which were cast by the Bilbies of Chew Stoke. In the north wall is a recess containing the effigy of Thomas de Moreton which was discovered in 1858.

Above the ceiling of the Bickfield Chapel there is a void which contains a columbarium or dovecote. This housed 140 "squabs" or pigeons in 1606 for the rector's table.

The church is a Grade I listed building, and several of the monuments in the churchyard also have listed status; the King Walter monument, Symes Monument and an unidentified monument accompanied with the Crosse monument.

Wade and Wade in their 1929 book "Somerset" described the church as "quite remarkable" "The church is one of the finest bits of Norm. work in the county. The nave is entirely late Norm., and possesses the unusual feature of a clerestory. The fine arcades, with their cylindrical columns and circular abaci, are too obvious to escape notice, but particular attention should be paid to the twisted pillar on the N.E. The chancel has an extremely low quadripartite vault, the effect of which is rather spoilt by the distortion of the chancel arch through some defect in the foundations. The aisles are Perp., and the one on the S. curiously encloses the clerestory. Note (1) the junction of the Perp. arch and Norm. pillars, (2) recessed effigy of a lady at E. end of N. aisle, (3) semi-circular recess, probably for additional altar (cp. Cudworth); (4) Norm. font on a fluted pedestal, (5) Perp. screen, said to have been an importation. There is a Perp. W. tower of weak design and poor workmanship, opening into the nave by a panelled arch."

- Somerset by Wade, G.W. & Wade, J.H. at Project Gutenberg

== Other Grade II listed buildings ==
- Historic England. "Moat Farmhouse at Images of England (1136125)". National Heritage List for England.
- Historic England. "Coombe Lodge at Images of England (1129637)". National Heritage List for England.
- Historic England. "Earl's Farmhouse at Images of England (1136137)". National Heritage List for England.
- Historic England. "Parsons Hill and Old Rectory and attached stable block at Images of England (1129639)". National Heritage List for England.
- Historic England. "Combe Farmhouse at Images of England (1129636)". National Heritage List for England.
- Historic England. "Highfield House at Images of England (1136133)". National Heritage List for England.
