= Farrington Gurney =

Village in Somerset, England

Coordinates: 51.2987°N 2.5327°W

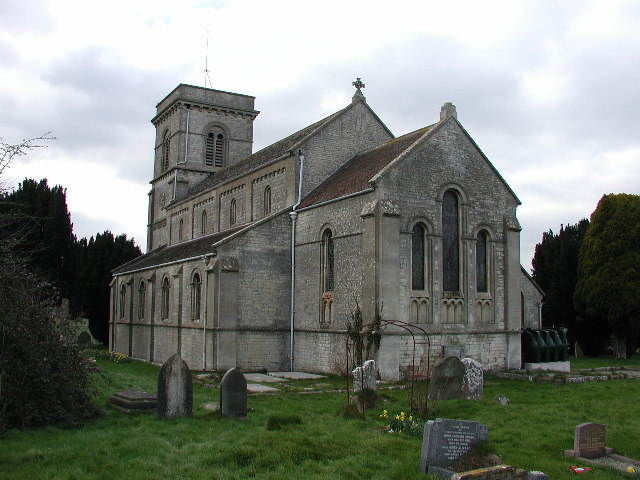
- Church of St John the Baptist

- Location within Somerset
- Population: 901 (in 2021)
- OS grid reference: ST629556
- Unitary authority: Bath and North East Somerset
- Ceremonial county: Somerset
- Region: South West
- Country: England
- Sovereign state: United Kingdom
- Post town: Bristol
- Postcode district: BS39
- Dialling code: 01761
- Police: Avon and Somerset
- Fire: Avon
- Ambulance: South Western
- UK Parliament: North East Somerset and Hanham
- Website: Parish Council

Farrington Gurney is a village and civil parish in Bath and North East Somerset, England. It lies at the foot of the Mendip Hills around the junction of the A37 and A362, about 2 miles (3.2 km) north-west of Midsomer Norton. The parish had a population of 906 at the 2021 census.

== History ==
In the Domesday Book, the village was recorded as Ferentone. The second part of the name is believed to come from the Gournays, its ancient possessors, including Robert de Gournay in 1225. When Sir Thomas de Gournay was implicated in the murder of Edward II at Berkeley Castle, his estates were confiscated; Farrington was later annexed to the Duchy of Cornwall.

The parish was part of the hundred of Chewton.

The manor house is believed to date from 1637, and the old parsonage from around 1700.

Ccoal mining on the Somerset coalfield began in the 17th century. Farrington Gurney Colliery operated from around 1738 until 1923.

An unstaffed railway station, or "halt", existed in the village from 11 July 1927 to 2 November 1959, when the Bristol and North Somerset Railway line closed.

== RAF aircraft crash ==
On 17 September 1944 a Royal Air Force Airspeed Horsa I (RJ113) was taking part in Operation Market Garden. While en-route the aircraft exploded which caused the tail to separate and the glider crashed at Double Hills near Farrington Gurney, killing the two pilots and all 21 paratroopers of the 9th Field Company RE (Airborne).

== Governance ==
Farrington Gurney's parish council is responsible for local issues, including setting an annual precept (local rate) to cover its operating costs, and producing annual accounts for public scrutiny. It evaluates local planning applications and works with the local police, district council officers, and neighbourhood watch groups on matters of crime, security and traffic. It initiates projects for the maintenance and repair of parish facilities, such as the village hall and community centre, playing fields and playgrounds, and consults with the district council on the maintenance, repair and improvement of highways, drainage, footpaths, public transport and street cleaning. It also addresses conservation and environmental matters, including trees and listed buildings.

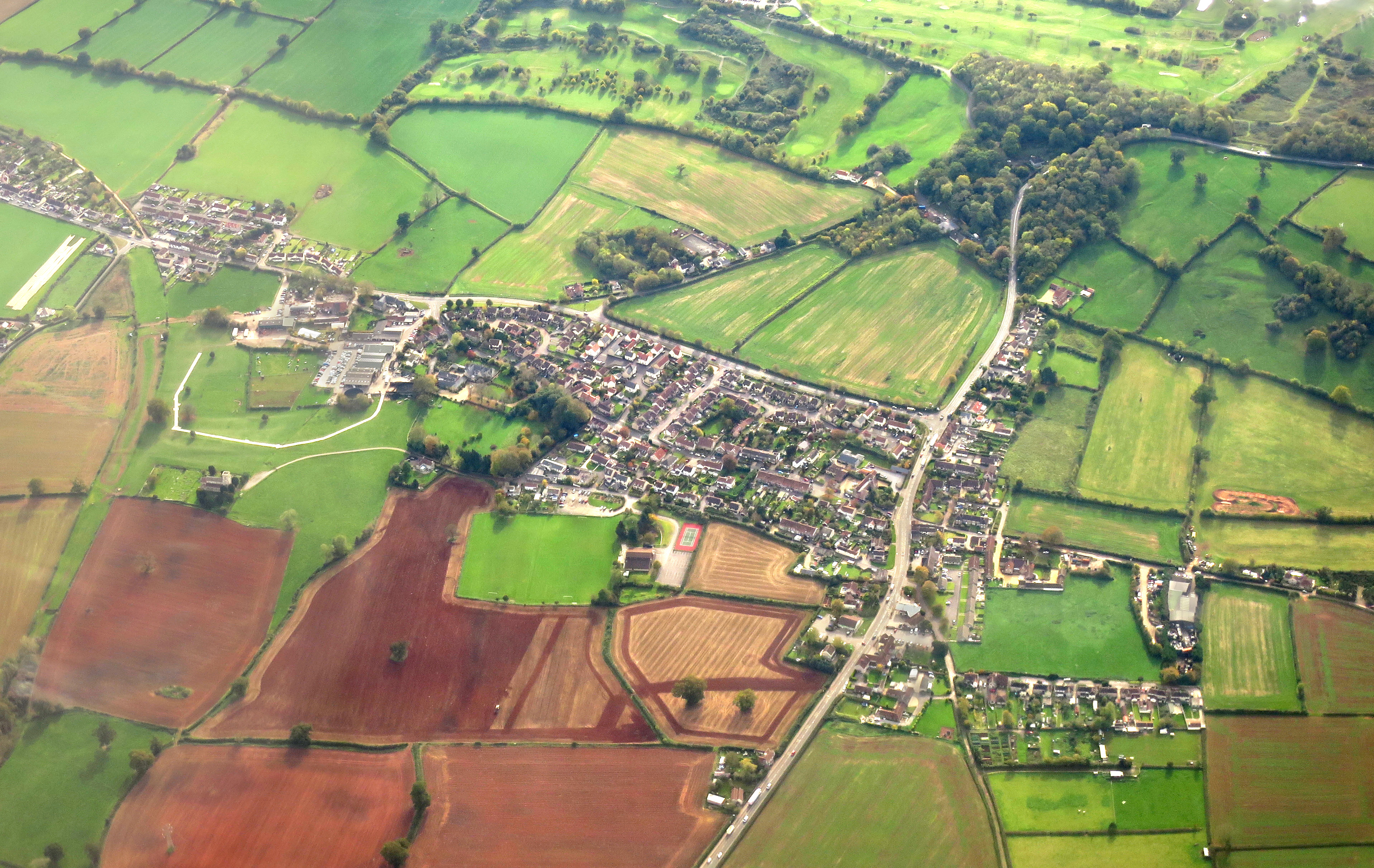
An aerial view of the village

The parish falls within the unitary authority of Bath and North East Somerset. Created in 1996 as established by the Local Government Act 1992, the authority provides a single tier of local government with responsibility for almost all local government functions within its area including local planning and building control, local roads, council housing, environmental health, markets and fairs, refuse collection, recycling, cemeteries, crematoria, leisure services, parks, and tourism. It is also responsible for education, social services, libraries, main roads, public transport, trading standards, waste disposal and strategic planning, although fire, police and ambulance services are provided jointly with other authorities through the Avon Fire and Rescue Service, Avon and Somerset Constabulary and the Great Western Ambulance Service.

Bath and North East Somerset's area covers part of the ceremonial county of Somerset but is administered independently of the non-metropolitan county. Its administrative headquarters is in Bath. Between 1 April 1974 and 1 April 1996, it was the Wansdyke district and the City of Bath of the county of Avon. Before 1974, the parish was part of the Clutton Rural District.

The parish is represented in the House of Commons of the Parliament of the United Kingdom as part of the North East Somerset and Hanham constituency. It elects one Member of Parliament (MP) by the "first past the post" election system. It was also part of the South West England constituency of the European Parliament, prior to Britain leaving the European Union in January 2020, which elected seven MEPs using the d'Hondt method of party-list proportional representation.

== Education ==
There is a primary school in the village, Farrington Gurney Church of England Primary School.

== Religious sites ==
The parish church is a small stone edifice dedicated to St John the Baptist. Originally of Norman architecture, it was rebuilt in Gothic style by John Pinch the younger in 1843. The stump of the medieval cross and a carving over the door survive from an earlier building. The church is set away from the main village in a picturesque location in the middle of a field, originally in order to protect the villagers from the plague.

The Methodist Church on the main A37/39 road is part of the North East Somerset and Bath Circuit of Methodist Churches. Methodism started in the village around 1823, and the first building was near the site of the old village hall. The present church was built in 1880–1881 at a cost of £485, with a further £129 spent on furnishings. The land was negotiated from the Duchy of Cornwall by Colonel Mogg from Manor House. (As Mogg was an Anglican, it was an early example of Ecumenism.) Schoolrooms were added in 1909, and electric lighting in 1931. The last significant addition was the toilet and kitchen extension in 1971. The building is used during the week by the Little Stars Nursery.

== Sport ==
Farrington Gurney FC was founded in 1901 and joined the Somerset FA that year. Farrington joined the Mid-Somerset Football League in the 1961/62 season, and stayed with the league for four seasons before moving to the Bristol League. The 1975/76 season saw Farrington Gurney switch back to the Mid-Somerset League from the Bristol Suburban League going straight into Division 2. After winning promotion in style, the next few seasons saw Farrington Gurney struggle in the Premier Division, finishing 7th (1976/77), bottom (1977/78) and again bottom (1978/79). They were relegated to the First Division in 1979 and finished 4th that season. Farrington Gurney finished the 1990 season well by getting promoted back to the First Division. The Farrington Gurney Football Club play in Division 2 East of the Somerset County League.
