= Bath and North East Somerset =

District in England

- Unitary authority area
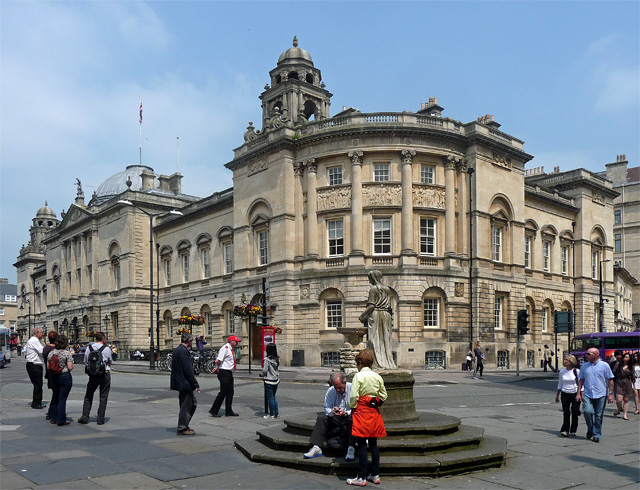
- Guildhall, Bath, the meeting place of Bath and North East Somerset Council

- Bath and North East Somerset shown within Somerset
- Interactive map of Bath and North East Somerset
- Sovereign state: United Kingdom
- Constituent country: England
- Region: South West England
- Ceremonial county: Somerset
- Combined authority: West of England
- Admin HQ: Bath and Keynsham
- Created: 1 April 1996

Government
  - Type: unitary authority
  - Council Leader: Kevin Guy
  - Council: Liberal Democrats
  - MPs: Wera Hobhouse (LD); Dan Norris (L); Anna Sabine (LD)

Area
  - Total: 135.57 sq mi (351.12 km^{2})
  - Land: 134 sq mi (346 km^{2})
  - Water: 2.02 sq mi (5.24 km^{2})
  - Rank: 103rd

Population (2025)
  - Total: 200,898 (Ranked 101st)
  - Density: 1,340/sq mi (518/km^{2})

Ethnicity (2021)
  - Ethnic groups: List: 92.2% White; 3.3% Asian; 2.7% Mixed; 1% Black; 0.8% other

Religion (2021)
  - Religion: List: 47.9% no religion; 42.2% Christianity; 8.9% other; 1% Islam
- Time zone: UTC0 (GMT)
  - Summer (DST): UTC+1 (BST)
- Postcode: BA and BS
- Area codes: 01225 and others
- ISO 3166 code: GB-BAS
- ONS code: 00HA (ONS); E06000022 (GSS)
- Website: bathnes.gov.uk

Bath and North East Somerset (B&NES) is a unitary authority area in the ceremonial county of Somerset, South West England. As its name suggests, it comprises the north-east part of Somerset including the city of Bath, which is its administrative headquarters. It has an area of 136 square miles (352 km^{2}).

The area was created on 1 April 1996 as part of the abolition of the county of Avon, and covers the same area as the former Avon districts of Wansdyke and Bath. Legally, it comprises a non-metropolitan county and a non-metropolitan district with identical boundaries. The area is governed by Bath and North East Somerset Council, which was created on the same date and which is constituted as a non-metropolitan district council with the responsibilities of a non-metropolitan county council. In addition to its headquarters in Bath, it also has offices in Keynsham. Other settlements in the area include Midsomer Norton, Radstock, Westfield, and Saltford.

== History ==
Bath and North East Somerset was created in 1996, as part of larger reforms to English local government that took place in the 1990s.

The boundaries of what is now the unitary authority area were first defined in 1974, when the non-metropolitan county of Avon was created from the county boroughs of Bristol and Bath and parts of the administrative counties of Gloucestershire and Somerset. Avon was divided into six non-metropolitan districts including Wansdyke and Bath, the two of which together covered the same area as the current unitary authority area.

Avon and its districts were abolished in 1996, under the provisions of the Avon (Structural Change) Order 1995. The same order established Bath and North East Somerset by creating a new non-metropolitan district and non-metropolitan county with the same area as the former districts Wansdyke and Bath.

== Geography ==
Bath and North East Somerset covers an area of 136 square miles (352 km^{2}), of which two thirds is green belt. It stretches from the outskirts of Bristol, south into the Mendip Hills and east to the southern Cotswold Hills and Wiltshire border. Surrounding local government areas include Bristol, North Somerset, Somerset, South Gloucestershire, and Wiltshire.

The city of Bath is the principal settlement in the district, but B&NES also covers Keynsham, Midsomer Norton, Radstock and the Chew Valley. Bath lies on the River Avon and its tributaries such as the River Chew and Midford Brook cross the area.

In the west of the area the Chew Valley consists of the valley of the River Chew and is generally low-lying and undulating. It is bounded by higher ground ranging from Dundry Down to the north, the Lulsgate Plateau to the west, the Mendip Hills to the south and the Hinton Blewett, Marksbury and Newton St Loe plateau areas to the east. The River Chew was dammed in the 1950s to create Chew Valley Lake, which provides drinking water for the nearby city of Bristol and surrounding areas. The lake is a prominent landscape feature of the valley, a focus for recreation, and is internationally recognised for its nature conservation interest, because of the bird species, plants and insects.

To the north of Bath are Lansdown, Langridge and Solsbury hills. These are outliers of the Cotswolds.

== Governance ==
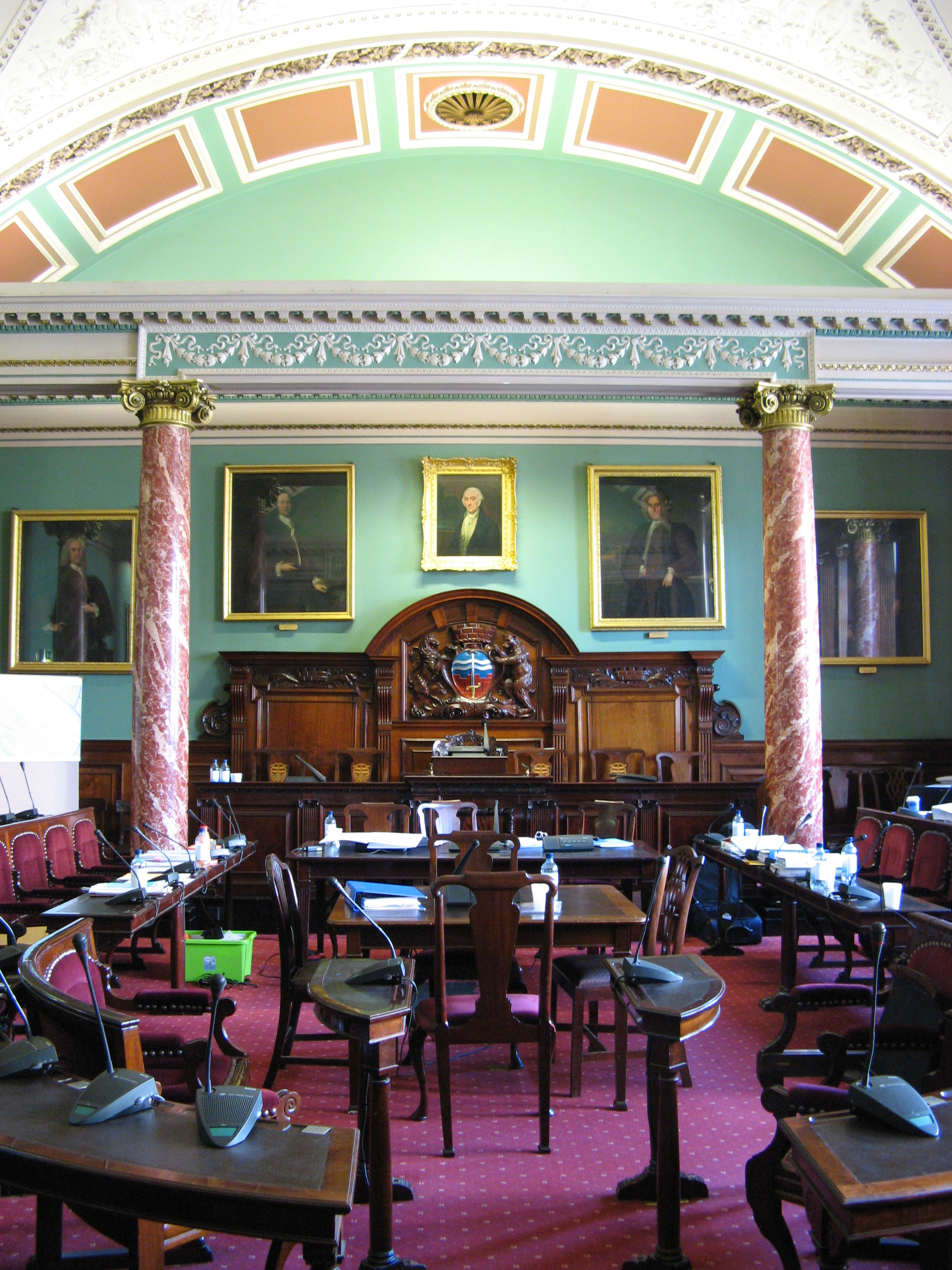
The council chamber in the Guildhall

The unitary authority area is governed by Bath and North East Somerset Council. As a single-tier local authority, it is responsible for most local government functions including local planning and building control, local roads, council housing, environmental health, markets and fairs, refuse collection, recycling, cemeteries, crematoria, leisure services, parks, and tourism. It is also responsible for education, social services, libraries, main roads, public transport, trading standards, waste disposal and strategic planning. Fire, police and ambulance services are provided jointly with other authorities through the Avon Fire and Rescue Service, Avon and Somerset Constabulary and the South Western Ambulance Service.

The current council consists of 59 councillors. The political division after the 2023 Bath and North East Somerset Council election was:

Bath and North East Somerset Council election, 2023
Party	Seats	Gains	Losses	Net gain/loss	Seats %	Votes %	Votes	+/−
Liberal Democrats	41	7	3	▲4	69.5%	42.5%	40,739	▼1.2%
Labour	5	2	0	Steady	8.5%	14.5%	13,908	▲1.9%
Independent	5	1	2	▼1	8.5%	5.9%	5,620	▲0.5%
Conservative	3	0	8	▼8	5.1%	24.1%	23,121	▼0.9%
Green	3	3	0	▲3	5.1%	13.0%	12,440	▲3.7%

=== Parishes ===
The city of Bath is unparished. The fifteen electoral wards of Bath are: Bathwick, Combe Down, Kingsmead, Lambridge, Lansdown, Moorlands, Newbridge, Odd Down, Oldfield Park, Southdown, Twerton, Walcot, Westmoreland, Weston and Widcombe & Lyncombe. These wards are co-extensive with the city, except that Newbridge includes also two parishes beyond the city boundary.

Image	Name	Status	Population	Former local authority	Coordinates	Refs
Yellow stone building, with porch with triangular roof in front. Short square tower with battlements topped by flag and flag pole. Gray gravestones in the foreground	Bathampton	Civil parish	1,603	Bathavon Rural District	51.39°N 2.32°W	
White fronted buildings with windows with small panes of glass. Shop signs for fish and chips and a pub. Postbox on the pavement in front of the buildings separated by black railings.	Batheaston	Civil parish	2,735	Bathavon Rural District	51.41°N 2.31°W	
Street scene with yellow stone houses on the left and trees showing above a wall on the right	Bathford	Civil parish	1,759	Bathavon Rural District	51.39°N 2.30°W	
Side of stone building with arched windows, partially obscured by trees. Gravestones in the foreground	Cameley	Civil parish	1,292	Clutton Rural District	51.32°N 2.56°W	
Square grey tower of stone church building, partially obscured by trees. Red roofed lych gate to right. Grass and gravestones in the foreground	Camerton	Civil parish	655	Bathavon Rural District	51.32°N 2.45°W	
Gray building with tower at the near end. Trees to right. Gravestones in front	Charlcombe	Civil parish	422	Bathavon Rural District	51.41°N 2.36°W	
Gray stone building. Prominent square tower with arched window, topped by small slate pyramidal roof. Left and right of the building are yew trees amongst gravestones.	Chelwood	Civil parish	148	Clutton Rural District	51.35°N 2.52°W	
Street scene showing road junction and grey stone buildings with parked cars in front of them. To the left is a grassy area with a tree.	Chew Magna	Civil parish	1,149	Clutton Rural District	51.37°N 2.61°W	
multiple buildings with red and grey roofs nestled amongst trees. Church tower to the left. Foreground is grassy fields and hedgerows. Background is hills.	Chew Stoke	Civil parish	991	Clutton Rural District	51.35°N 2.64°W	
Gray stone building with slate roof. Attached to the right is a wooden structure over water, partially obscured by trees	Claverton	Civil parish	115	Bathavon Rural District	51.38°N 2.31°W	
Stone building, partially obscured by trees. Red brick tower with horizontal stripe pattern surmounted by battlements.	Clutton	Civil parish	1,602	Clutton Rural District	51.33°N 2.54°W	
Semicircular stone steps, partially obscured by trees. Water to the left	Combe Hay	Civil parish	147	Bathavon Rural District	51.34°N 2.38°W	
Gray stone building with arched windows. Square tower topped with spirelet, flagpole and weather vane. Foreground has small trees and bushes and a wooden rail fence.	Compton Dando	Civil parish	579	Keynsham Urban District	51.38°N 2.51°W	
In the foreground are a stone wall and road. Beyond is an area of water surrounded by trees and white fronted houses.	Compton Martin	Civil parish	508	Clutton Rural District	51.31°N 2.65°W	
Gray stone building with small square tower and pyramidal roof. Grassy foreground with a cross and gravestones	Corston	Civil parish	494	Bathavon Rural District	51.39°N 2.44°W	
White caravan on grassy bridge, surrounded by small trees and shrubs	Dunkerton	Civil parish	502	Bathavon Rural District	51.33°N 2.41°W	
Red and grey stone building with arched windows and triangular roof. Behind is a small square tower	East Harptree	Civil parish	644	Clutton Rural District	51.30°N 2.62°W	
Roofs of houses visible amongst green fields and hedgerows. Large rock in the foreground.	Englishcombe	Civil parish	318	Bathavon Rural District	51.36°N 2.41°W	
Gray stone building with square tower at left hand end. Grass and gravestones in the foreground.	Farmborough	Civil parish	1,035	Clutton Rural District	51.34°N 2.48°W	
Gray stone building with square tower at far end. Grass and gravestones in the foreground.	Farrington Gurney	Civil parish	901	Clutton Rural District	51.29°N 2.53°W	
Yellow stone building with grey slate roof and grey chimney, surrounding by houses and trees. In the foreground is a path with a high stone wall and vegetation.	Freshford	Civil parish	551	Bathavon Rural District	51.34°N 2.31°W	
Grey stone building on 3 bays with a square stone tower at near end of central bay. To the left is a porch with slate roof. In front is a yew tree and gravestones behind a stone wall separating it from a road.	High Littleton	Civil parish	2,104	Clutton Rural District	51.32°N 2.51°W	
Church tower seen arising behind stone buildings with tile roofs, one of which has a pub sign. Foreground is grass	Hinton Blewett	Civil parish	308	Clutton Rural District	51.31°N 2.58°W	
Gray stone building with small square tower at left hand end. In the foreground is grass with a small tiled memorial.	Hinton Charterhouse	Civil parish	515	Bathavon Rural District	51.33°N 2.32°W	
Stone building with tower to right hand side. In front is a wall separating the building from the road.	Kelston	Civil Parish	248	Bathavon Rural District	51.40°N 2.43°W	
Street scene showing shops on left and right, with cars and vans on road. On the left hand pavement is a sign saying welcome to Keynsham high street.	Keynsham	Town	15,641	Keynsham Urban District	51.41°N 2.49°W	
Top of ower with spirelets seen behind trees. In the foreground is grass and gravestones	Marksbury	Civil parish	397	Bathavon Rural District	51.36°N 2.48°W	
A river running between pavements with railings. Shops behind	Midsomer Norton	Town	10,997	Norton Radstock	51.28°N 2.48°W	
The roofs of houses and farm buildings in a green valley. Trees in the foreground	Monkton Combe	Civil parish	554	Bathavon Rural District	51.36°N 2.33°W	
Gray stone building with tower at right hand end surmounted by a small spirelet, partially obscured by trees.	Nempnett Thrubwell	Civil parish	177	Clutton Rural District	51.34°N 2.68°W	
Reddish brown building with tower nearest the camera. Trees to left and right	Newton St Loe	Civil parish	681	Bathavon Rural District	51.38°N 2.43°W	
The roofs of a row of houses amongst green fields.	Norton Malreward	Civil parish	246	Clutton Rural District	51.39°N 2.57°W	
Large conical black mound with trees in the foreground	Paulton	Civil parish	5,302	Clutton Rural District	51.31°N 2.50°W	
Gray stone building on the left with a pub sign outside it. A road is central to the picture with a white coloured building on the right.	Peasedown St John	Civil parish	6,446	Bathavon Rural District	51.32°N 2.44°W	
Gray building with arched windows. Square tower surmounted by a weather vane. Gravestones and crosses in grass in the foreground separated from the road by a stone wall.	Priston	Civil parish	232	Bathavon Rural District	51.34°N 2.44°W	
Gray stone bridge with two arches over water. The central pillar is on a small island. Trees to the left and right and behind the bridge.	Publow	Civil parish	1,119	Clutton Rural District	51.37°N 2.55°W	
Large wheel on brick tower.	Radstock	Town	5,620	Norton Radstock Town Council	51.29°N 2.4477°W	
Gray stone building with red tiled roof, partially obscured by a hedge. A square tower is at the far end. The foreground includes several crosses and gravestones.	Saltford	Civil parish	4,073	Keynsham Urban District	51.40°N 2.46°W	
Several houses, many with white walls and red roofs nestling in a green valley with occasional trees.	Shoscombe	Civil parish	443	Bathavon Rural District	51.30°N 2.41°W	
Gray stone building with prominent four stage tower at the right hand end. To the left is a large yew tree.	Southstoke	Civil parish	460	Bathavon Rural District	51.35°N 2.36°W	
Gray stone building with square tower behind. In the foreground are green fields and bushes.	Stanton Drew	Civil parish	787	Clutton Rural District	51.37°N 2.58°W	
The roofs of many houses can be seen in a green valley with several trees.	Stowey-Sutton	Civil parish	1,361	Clutton Rural District	51.34°N 2.59°W	
The roofs of several houses can be seen nestling in a green valley with lots of trees.	Swainswick	Civil parish	265	Bathavon Rural District	51.41°N 2.35°W	
Gray three bay building with arched windows. Tower behind and gravestones in the foreground.	Timsbury	Civil parish	2,624	Clutton Rural District	51.33°N 2.48°W	
Gray stone building with square tower surmounted by a spire on the left. Surrounded by trees and green fields.	Ubley	Civil parish	331	Clutton Rural District	51.32°N 2.68°W	
The roofs of many houses, and a church spire can be seen in a green valley with several trees.	Wellow	Civil parish	529	Bathavon Rural District	51.32°N 2.37°W	
	Westfield	Civil parish	5,854	Norton Radstock Town Council	51.29°N 2.448°W	
Street scene with a church and spire central to the picture. To the right is a yellow building with a pub sign. To the left is a large tree with a signpost in front. Several cars.	West Harptree	Civil parish	439	Clutton Rural District	51.31°N 2.63°W	
Gray stone building with arched windows. A central tower has a clock on the near face and is surmounted by a weather vane.	Whitchurch	Civil parish	1,354	Bathavon Rural District	51.41°N 2.56°W	

== Demography ==
Population Profile
UK Census 2001	B&NES UA	SW England	England
Total population	169,040	4,928,434	49,138,831
Foreign born	11.2%	9.4%	9.2%
White	97.3%	97.7%	91%
Asian	0.5%	0.7%	4.6%
Black	0.5%	0.4%	2.3%
Christian	71.0%	74.0%	72%
Muslim	0.4%	0.5%	3.1%
Hindu	0.2%	0.2%	1.1%
No religion	19.5%	16.8%	15%
Over 75 years old	8.9%	9.3%	7.5%
Unemployed	2.0%	2.6%	3.3%

170,238 people live in the area and approximately half live in the City of Bath making it 12 times more densely populated than the rest of the area.

According to the UK Government's 2001 census, Bath, together with North East Somerset, which includes areas around Bath as far as the Chew Valley, has a population of 169,040, with an average age of 39.9 (the national average being 38.6). According to the same statistics, the district is overwhelmingly populated by people of a white ethnic background at 97.2% – significantly higher than the national average of 90.9%. Other non-white ethnic groups in the district, in order of population size, are multiracial at 1%, Asian at 0.5% and black at 0.5% (the national averages are 1.3%, 4.6% and 2.1%, respectively).

The district is largely Christian at 71%, with no other religion reaching more than 0.5%. These figures generally compare with the national averages, though the non-religious, at 19.5%, are significantly more prevalent than the national 14.8%. Although Bath is known for the restorative powers of its waters, and only 7.4% of the population describe themselves as "not healthy" in the last 12 months, compared to a national average of 9.2%; only 15.8% of the inhabitants say they have had a long-term illness, as against 18.2% nationally.

Population since 1801 – Source: A Vision of Britain through Time
Year	1801	1851	1901	1911	1921	1931	1941	1951	1961	1971	1981	1991	2001
Population B&NES	57,188	96,992	107,637	113,732	113,351	112,972	123,185	134,346	144,950	156,421	154,083	164,737	169,045

== Economy ==
This is a chart of trend of regional gross value added of North and North East Somerset and South Gloucestershire at current basic prices published by Office for National Statistics with figures in millions of British Pounds Sterling.

Year	Regional Gross Value Added	Agriculture	Industry	Services
1995	5,916	125	1,919	3,872
2000	8,788	86	2,373	6,330
2003	10,854	67	2,873	7,914

== Settlements ==
The major towns and villages in the district are:

- Bath
- Bathampton
- Peasedown
- Keynsham
- Midsomer Norton
- Paulton
- Radstock
- Saltford
- Chew Magna

== Transport ==
Bath is approximately 12 miles (19 km) south-east of the larger city and port of Bristol, to which it is linked by the A4 road, and is a similar distance south of the M4 motorway. Bath and North East Somerset is also served by the A37 and A368 trunk roads, and a network of smaller roads. Bath is also 12 miles (19 km) south-west of Chippenham, and 8 miles (13 km) south-west of Corsham.

Bath is connected to Bristol and the sea by the River Avon, navigable via locks by small boats. The river was connected to the River Thames and London by the Kennet & Avon Canal in 1810 via Bath Locks; this waterway – closed for many years, but restored in the last years of the 20th century – is now popular with narrow boat users. Bath is on National Cycle Route 4, with one of Britain's first cycleways, the Bristol & Bath Railway Path, to the west, and an eastern route toward London on the canal towpath. Although Bath does not have an airport, the city is about 18 miles (29 km) from Bristol Airport, which may be reached by road or by rail via Bristol Temple Meads station.

Bath is served by the Bath Spa railway station (designed by Isambard Kingdom Brunel), which has regular connections to London Paddington, Bristol Temple Meads, Cardiff Central, Swansea, Exeter St Davids, Plymouth and Penzance (see Great Western Main Line), and also Westbury, Warminster, Frome, Salisbury, Southampton Central, Portsmouth Harbour and Brighton (see Wessex Main Line). Services are provided by Great Western Railway. There are suburban stations on the main line at Oldfield Park and Keynsham which have a limited commuter service to Bristol. Green Park station was once operated by the Somerset & Dorset Joint Railway, whose line (always steam driven) climbed over the Mendip Hills and served many towns and villages on its 71-mile (114 km) run to Bournemouth; this example of an English rural line was closed by the Beeching cuts in March 1966, with few remaining signs of its existence, but its Bath station building survives and now houses a number of shops.

The 2004 Bristol/Bath to South Coast Study was commissioned as a result of the de-trunking in 1999 of the A36/A46 trunk road network from Bath to Southampton.

== Media ==
The area is served by BBC West and ITV West Country broadcasting from the Mendip TV transmitter.

Local radio stations are:

- BBC Radio Bristol on 94.9 FM, 103.6 FM and 104.6 FM
- BBC Radio Somerset on 95.5 FM
- Heart West on 96.3 FM, 102.6 FM and 103.0 FM
- Greatest Hits Radio Bath & The South West on 107.9 FM
- Greatest Hits Radio Bristol & The South West on 107.2 FM
- Hits Radio Bristol and Bath on 106.5 FM
- Somer Valley FM on 97.5 FM (serving Midsomer Norton, Radstock and Westfield)

== Education ==
State-funded schools are organised within the district of Bath and North East Somerset. A review of Secondary Education in Bath was started in 2007, primarily to reduce surplus provision and reduce the number of single-sex secondary schools in Bath, and to access capital funds available through the government's Building Schools for the Future programme.

The city contains one further education college, Bath College, and several sixth forms as part of both state, private, and public schools. In England, on average in 2006, 45.8% of pupils gained 5 grades A-C including English and Maths; for Bath and North East Somerset pupils taking GCSE at 16 it is 52.0%. Special needs education is provided by Three Ways School.

Bath has two universities. The University of Bath was established in 1966. It is known, academically, for the physical sciences, mathematics, architecture, management and technology.

Bath Spa University was first granted degree-awarding powers in 1992 as a university college (Bath Spa University College), before being granted university status in August 2005. It has schools in Art and Design, Education, English and Creative Studies, Historical and Cultural Studies, Music and the Performing Arts, and Social Sciences. It also awards degrees through colleges such as Weston College in nearby Weston-super-Mare.

== Sports ==
Bath Rugby plays at the Recreation Ground. Bath Cricket Club play at the North Parade cricket ground next door to the Recreation Ground.

Bath City F.C. is the major football team in Bath city but there are also clubs in the surrounding areas such as; Paulton Rovers F. C., Bishop Sutton A.F.C., Radstock Town F.C. and Welton Rovers F.C.

The Bath Half Marathon is run annually through the city streets, with over 10,000 runners. Bath also has a thriving cycling community, with places for biking including Royal Victoria Park, 'The Tumps' in Odd Down/east, the jumps on top of Lansdown, and Prior Park. Places for biking near Bath include Brown's Folly in Batheaston and Box Woods, in Box.

There are sport and leisure centres in Bath, Keynsham the Chew Valley and Midsomer Norton. Much of the surrounding countryside is accessible for walking and both Chew Valley Lake and Blagdon Lake provide extensive fishing under permit from Bristol Water. The River Chew and most of its tributaries also have fishing but this is generally under licences to local angling clubs. Chew Valley Sailing Club is situated on Chew Valley Lake and provides dinghy sailing at all levels and hosts national and international competitions.

== Places of interest ==
The area has 6,408 listed buildings, classified as of historical or architectural importance, of which 663 are Grade I, 212 are Grade II* and the remainder are Grade II. These include many buildings and areas of Bath such as Lansdown Crescent, the Royal Crescent, The Circus and Pulteney Bridge. Outside the city there are several historic manor houses such as St Catherine's Court and Sutton Court.

Bath is a major tourist centre and has a range of museums and art galleries including the Victoria Art Gallery, the Museum of East Asian Art and the Holburne Museum. There are numerous commercial art galleries and antique shops. Museums include No. 1 Royal Crescent, Bath Postal Museum, The Fashion Museum, the Jane Austen Centre, the Herschel Museum of Astronomy and the Roman Baths. The American Museum & Gardens is nearby.

The Radstock Museum details the history of the Somerset coalfield.

The Avon Valley Railway serves Avon Riverside railway station. The Somerset & Dorset Railway Heritage Trust is based at Midsomer Norton railway station.

== See also ==
- Grade I listed buildings in Bath and North East Somerset
- Grade II* listed buildings in Bath and North East Somerset
- List of scheduled monuments in Bath and North East Somerset
- List of tourist attractions in Somerset
- West of England Combined Authority
