= Shoscombe =

Village in Somerset, England

Coordinates: 51.3037°N 2.4066°W

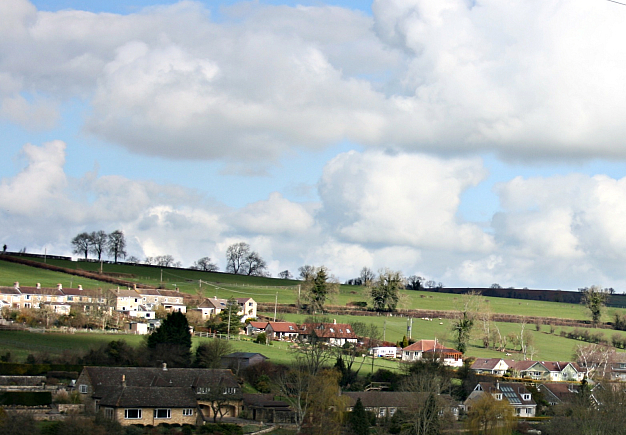

- Location within Somerset
- Population: 443
- OS grid reference: ST717561
- Unitary authority: Bath and North East Somerset
- Ceremonial county: Somerset
- Region: South West
- Country: England
- Sovereign state: United Kingdom
- Post town: Bath
- Postcode district: BA2
- Police: Avon and Somerset
- Fire: Avon
- Ambulance: South Western
- UK Parliament: Frome and East Somerset

Shoscombe is a small village and civil parish in the valley of the Wellow Brook in north-east Somerset, about 7 miles (11 km) south of Bath, England. The parish has a population of 443.

From 23 September 1929 until the line closed on 7 March 1966, Shoscombe had a railway station, Shoscombe and Single Hill Halt, on the main line of the Somerset and Dorset Joint Railway.

Shoscombe School is a Church of England Voluntary Aided Primary School, in a grade II listed building.

== Governance ==
The parish council has responsibility for local issues, including setting an annual precept (local rate) to cover the council's operating costs and producing annual accounts for public scrutiny. The parish council evaluates local planning applications and works with the local police, district council officers, and neighbourhood watch groups on matters of crime, security, and traffic. The parish council's role also includes initiating projects for the maintenance and repair of parish facilities, such as the village hall or community centre, playing fields and playgrounds, as well as consulting with the district council on the maintenance, repair, and improvement of highways, drainage, footpaths, public transport, and street cleaning. Conservation matters (including trees and listed buildings) and environmental issues are also of interest to the council.

The parish falls within the unitary authority of Bath and North East Somerset which was created in 1996, as established by the Local Government Act 1992. It provides a single tier of local government with responsibility for almost all local government functions within their area including local planning and building control, local roads, council housing, environmental health, markets and fairs, refuse collection, recycling, cemeteries, crematoria, leisure services, parks, and tourism. They are also responsible for education, social services, libraries, main roads, public transport, trading standards, waste disposal and strategic planning, although fire, police and ambulance services are provided jointly with other authorities through the Avon Fire and Rescue Service, Avon and Somerset Constabulary and the Great Western Ambulance Service.

Bath and North East Somerset's area covers part of the ceremonial county of Somerset but it is administered independently of the non-metropolitan county. Its administrative headquarters are in Bath. Between 1 April 1974 and 1 April 1996, it was the Wansdyke district and the City of Bath of the county of Avon. Before 1974 that the parish was part of the Bathavon Rural District.

The parish is represented in the House of Commons of the Parliament of the United Kingdom as part of Frome and East Somerset. It elects one member of parliament (MP) by the first past the post system of election.
