= Timsbury, Somerset =

Village in Somerset, England

Coordinates: 51.3268°N 2.4757°W

Timsbury
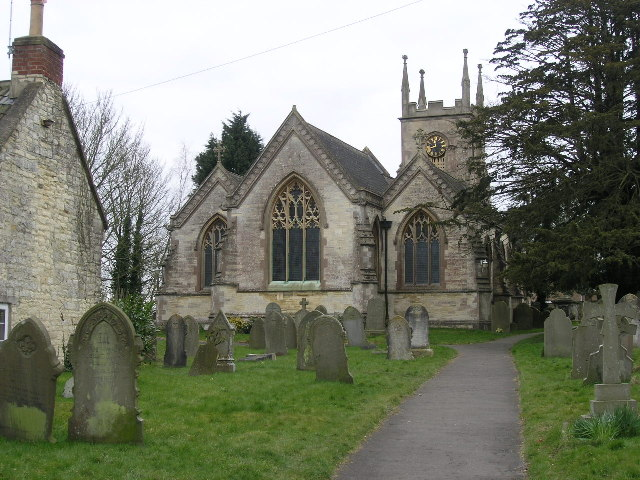
- St Mary's Church

- Location within Somerset
- Population: 2,624 in 2011
- OS grid reference: ST669587
- Unitary authority: Bath and North East Somerset
- Ceremonial county: Somerset
- Region: South West
- Country: England
- Sovereign state: United Kingdom
- Post town: BATH
- Postcode district: BA2
- Dialling code: 01761
- Police: Avon and Somerset
- Fire: Avon
- Ambulance: South Western
- UK Parliament: North East Somerset and Hanham

Timsbury is a village and civil parish in England, in the Bath and North East Somerset unitary authority of the county of Somerset. It lies 8 miles (13 km) south-west of Bath, close to the Cam Brook river. The parish, which includes the hamlets of Radford and Wall Mead, and part of Meadgate hamlet, had a population of 2,624 in 2011.

== History ==
The village has been known as Timfborough, Tymmersbarue, Timsbarrow (meaning Timbered grove), Timsbyre (wooded hillside) and Temsbury throughout its long history.

Timsbury has been a settlement since the Bronze Age. Among the earliest written records is entry in the Norman Domesday Book of 1086:

"Williams holds Timsbury from the Bishop of Coutance. Ape held it before 1066. It paid tax for 3 hides, land for 3 ploughs, in lordship, 1 plough, 2 slaves, one and one half hides, 2 villagers and 1 smallholder with 1 plough and one and one half hides, 2 parts of a mill which pays two shillings, meadow 26 acres. Pasture as well, 1 cob, 9 cattle, 14 pigs and 60 sheep, the value was 26 shillings, now 50 shillings."

The entry then goes on to describe the mill at Radford, to the south of the village.

The parish was part of the hundred of Chew.

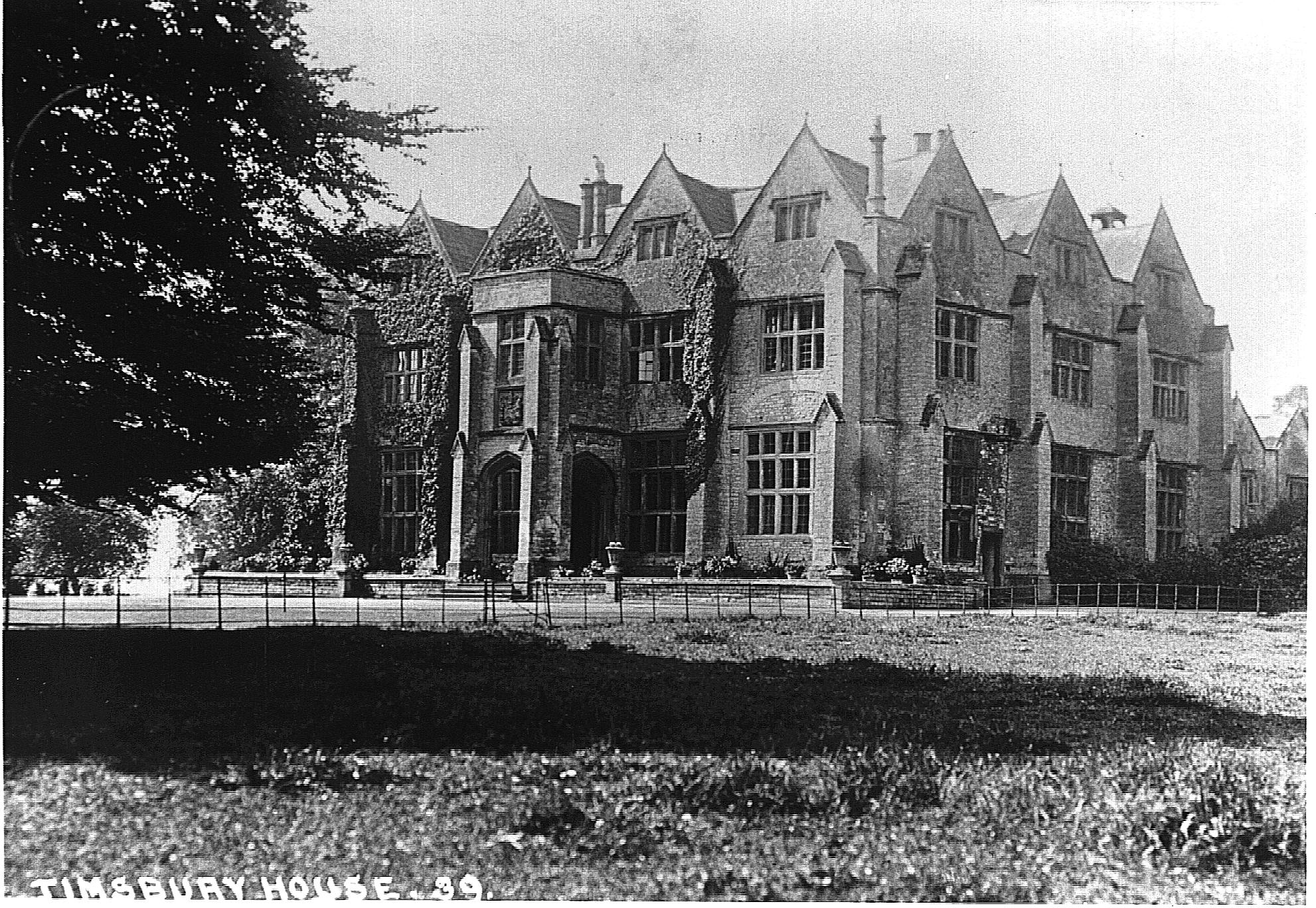
Timsbury Manor house (demolished 1961) viewed from the Avenue

Timsbury House was a large mansion house owned by the Samborne family. Built towards the end of the 15th century by Richard Samborne. His successor Barnaby Samborne was knighted for his services to Queen Elizabeth I. The building was demolished in 1961, and St. Marys Green and Somerset Folly estates now occupy the original site. One unusual feature of the estate was the presence of a ha-ha (sunken path). This was constructed to allow the Samborne family privacy from the local inhabitants as they passed the house.

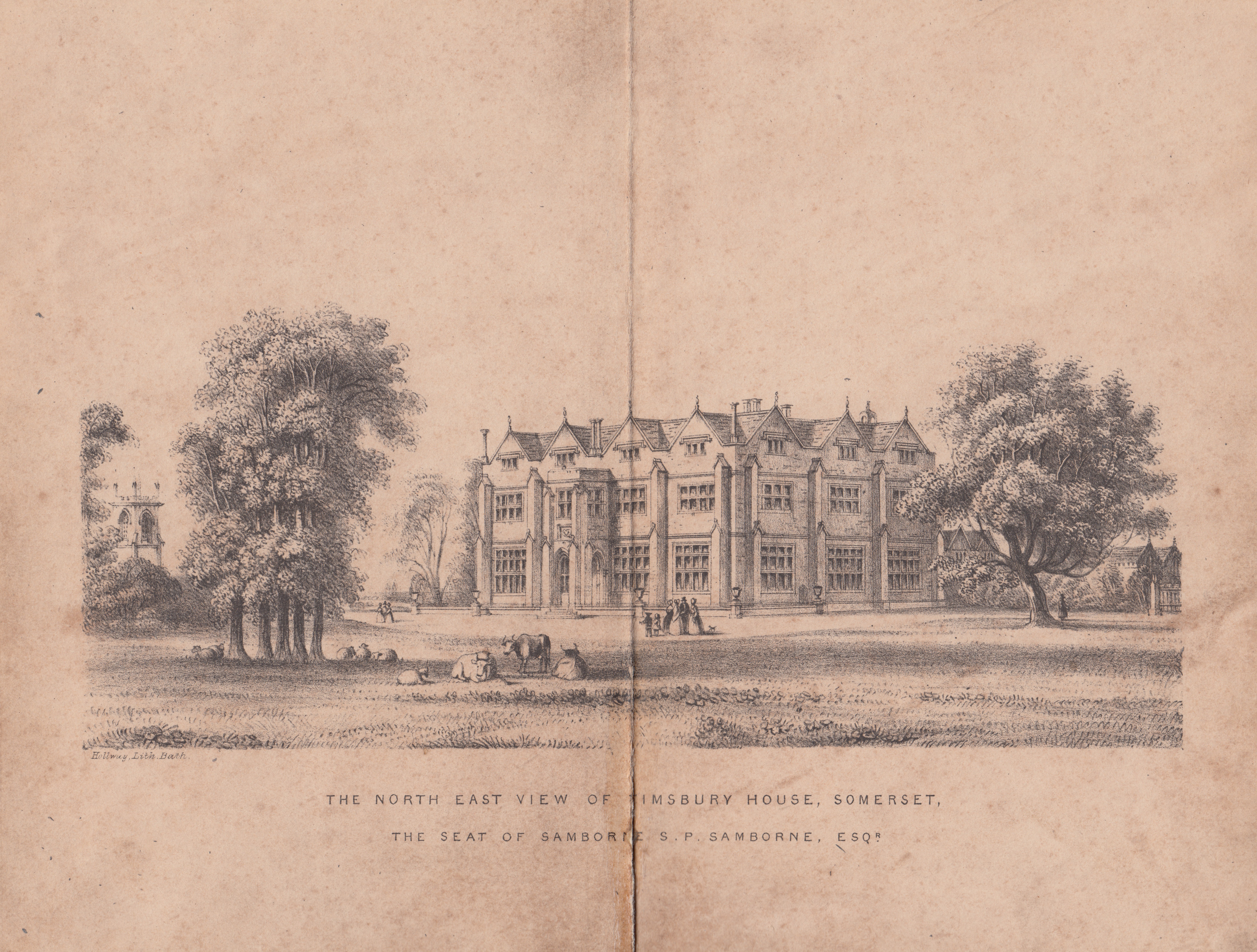
North East View of Timsbury House, Somerset, c.1859

Pitfour House in the High street was built in the mid 17th century. The terrace of houses at Crook Barton dates back to around 1700.

In 1795, the Gooseyard bridge in Timsbury parish was the starting point for the Somerset Coal Canal which served the seven coal mines at Amesbury, Mearns, Tyning, Hayeswood, Old Grove, and Upper and Lower Conygre, around the village which formed a major part of the Somerset Coalfield. Lower Conygre (Conigre in some old spellings) was sunk in 1847 and in 1896 was merged with the older Upper Congyre which had been started in 1791. They were owned by Samborne Smith and Company in 1908, and then by Beaumont, Kennedy and Co. The Amesbury pit opened before 1701 and closed in the early 19th century. Hayeswood colliery opened in 1750 and closed in 1862. Tyning opened in 1766 followed by Mearns which was sunk in 1783 and closed in 1824.

The canal was later replaced by a railway line in the early 1900s, the Great Western Railway Radford and Timsbury Halt served the needs of passengers from the village. The Coal canal brought prosperity to the village and several other large houses were built in the area. Renny's on Love's Hill, as was its neighbour, Vale House.

Parish's House on the south eastern side of the village was an 1816 extension of a much earlier house. It is attributed to Thomas Baldwin of Bath for Captain Parish R.N., is fronted by an ornate balustrade, and includes a stable block from the same date.

Greenhill House was also constructed in the early 1800s. Originally owned by St Johns Hospital in Bath, it has passed through the hands of various institutions during its history. It was eventually purchased by the charity originally known as The Cheshire Foundation Homes for the Sick, in 1976 it became the Leonard Cheshire Foundation. In July 2007 it changed to its current name, Leonard Cheshire Disability.

In 1978, the core of the village, centred around the Square and the High Street, was designated a conservation area, which is now considered "at risk". Many of its buildings constructed from the local White Lias stone in the 1700s are now protected from inappropriate development.

The Miners Memorial Garden, close to the Square, marks the village's long association with coal mining. It was in built in 1995 to mark the centenary of an underground explosion at Upper Conygre pit in 1895, which claimed the lives of seven miners and four horses.

== Governance ==
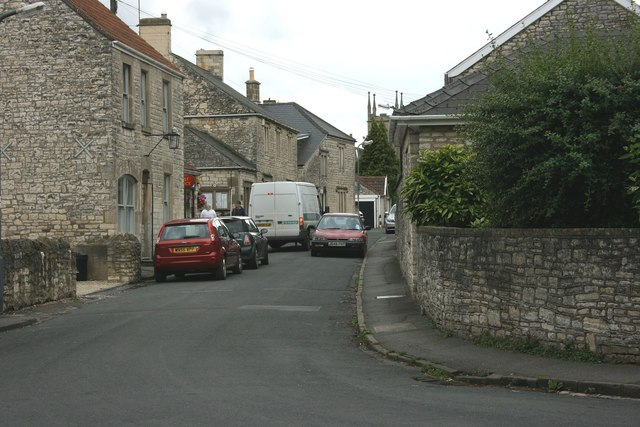
High Street

Since 1894, the parish council has responsibility for local issues, including setting an annual precept (local rate) to cover the council's operating costs and producing annual accounts for public scrutiny. The parish council evaluates local planning applications and works with the local police, district council officers, and neighbourhood watch groups on matters of crime, security, and traffic. The parish council's role also includes initiating projects for the maintenance and repair of parish facilities, such as the village hall or community centre, playing fields and playgrounds, community library, as well as consulting with the district council on the maintenance, repair, and improvement of highways, drainage, footpaths, public transport, and street cleaning. Conservation matters (including trees and listed buildings) and environmental issues are also of interest to the council.

The parish falls within the unitary authority of Bath and North East Somerset which was created in 1996, as established by the Local Government Act 1992. It provides a single tier of local government with responsibility for almost all local government functions within its area including local planning and building control, local roads, council housing, environmental health, markets and fairs, refuse collection, recycling, cemeteries, crematoria, leisure services, parks, and tourism. They are also responsible for education, social services, libraries, main roads, public transport, Trading Standards, waste disposal and strategic planning, although fire, police and ambulance services are provided jointly with other authorities through the Avon Fire and Rescue Service, Avon and Somerset Constabulary and the Great Western Ambulance Service.

Bath and North East Somerset's area covers part of the ceremonial county of Somerset but it is administered independently of the non-metropolitan county. Its administrative headquarters is in Bath. Between 1 April 1974 and 1 April 1996, it was the Wansdyke district and the City of Bath of the county of Avon. Before 1974 that the parish was part of the Clutton Rural District.

The village has one electoral ward with the same area and population as the parish.

The parish is represented in the House of Commons of the Parliament of the United Kingdom as part of North East Somerset and Hanham. It elects one Member of Parliament (MP) by the first past the post system of election.

== Geography ==
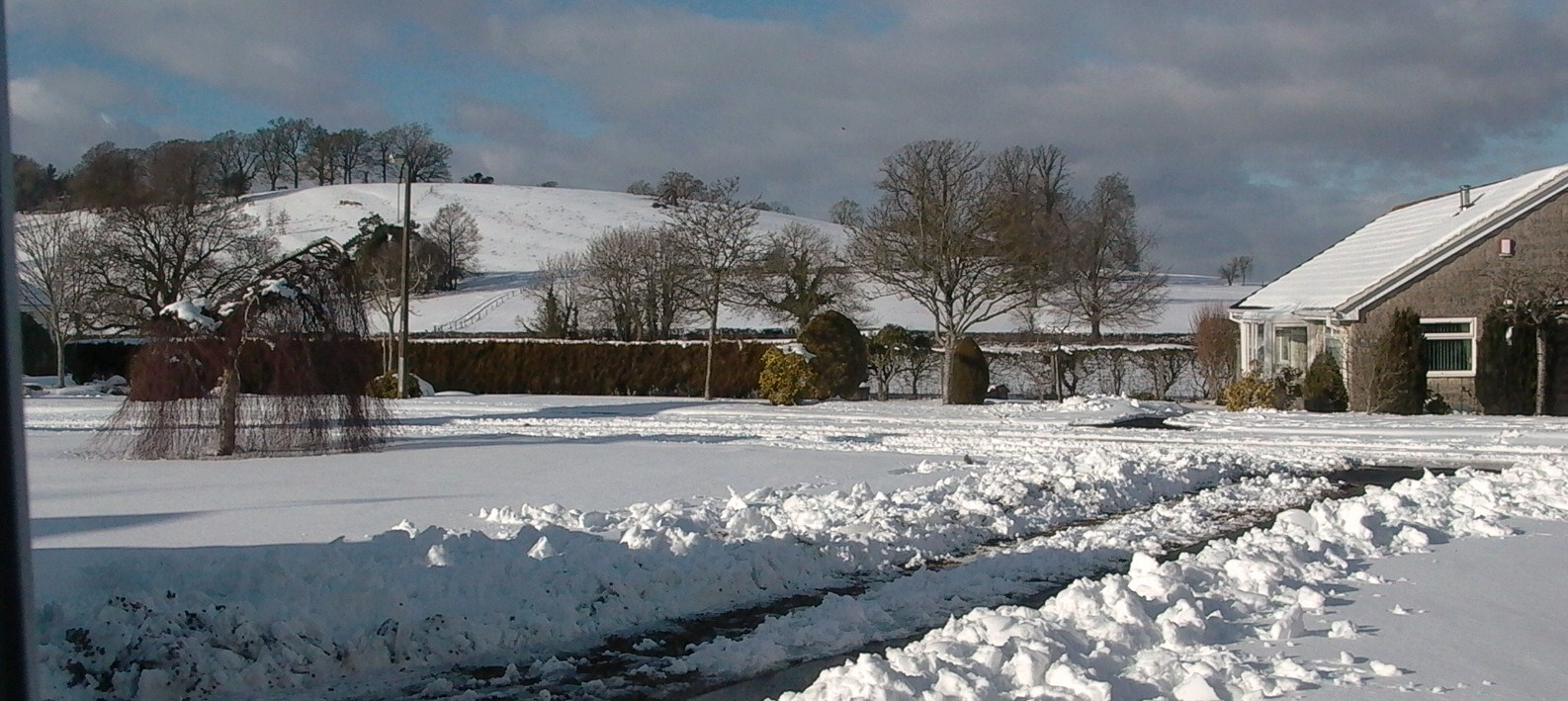
The Sleight, Timsbury, winter of 2009, looking north from Somerset Folly

The village is located on a plateau 500 feet (150 m) above sea level in the north east of Somerset. To the south is the northern edge of the Mendip Hills, to the north is Marksbury plain. Bordered by two water courses, to the north by the Conygre Brook, and to the south by the Cam Brook. Local landmarks to the north west include the Sleight, a small escarpment rising to 645 feet (197 m) for a distance of 0.89 miles (1.43 km) in an east westerly direction. This ridge leads the B3130 to the west of Timsbury past the Hayeswood Road Industrial Estate to connect with the A39. To the east is Tunley hill which rises to a height of 550 feet (170 m), this is the easterly route to Bath via the B3130.

There is some remaining managed woodland in the local area, but nothing like the amount there was in the past when the village was given its name of Timsbyre (wooded hillside). Dutch elm disease and the use of wood for building construction, fuel and furniture has denuded much of the local area of its trees.

=== Geology ===
The local underlying stone is of the Triassic period, known as White Lias limestone. It is close to the surface on the southern slopes of the village, and has been used extensively for building purposes for hundreds of years. Some of it has undergone slight metamorphic transformation and has become quite hardened. This factor is evident in many of the older buildings where the softer layer stone has more readily eroded in places. There is an abundance of freestone (rubble stone) in many of the local fields, and this has provided much of the walling stone for the local farms.

=== Climate ===
Along with the rest of South West England, Timsbury has a temperate climate which is generally wetter and milder than the rest of England. The annual mean temperature is about 10 °C (50 °F) with seasonal and diurnal variations, but due to the modifying effect of the sea, the range is less than in most other parts of the United Kingdom. January is the coldest month with mean minimum temperatures between 1 and 2 °C (34 and 36 °F). July and August are the warmest months in the region with mean daily maxima around 21 °C (70 °F). In general, December is the dullest month and June the sunniest. The south west of England enjoys a favoured location, particularly in summer, when the Azores High extends its influence north-eastwards towards the UK.

Cloud often forms inland, especially near hills, and reduces exposure to sunshine. The average annual sunshine totals around 1600 hours. Rainfall tends to be associated with Atlantic depressions or with convection. In summer, convection caused by solar surface heating sometimes forms shower clouds and a large proportion of the annual precipitation falls from showers and thunderstorms at this time of year. Average rainfall is around 800–900 mm (31–35 in). About 8–15 days of snowfall is typical. November to March have the highest mean wind speeds, with June to August having the lightest. The predominant wind direction is from the south west.

== Local amenities ==
Timsbury has four churches catering for various denominations and two cemeteries. The parish Church of St Mary the Virgin was rebuilt in 1826–32 and the east end added in 1852 by Sir George Gilbert Scott. It has been designated by English Heritage as a Grade II* listed building. In the churchyard are monuments to James Collins, Robert Langford, the Parsons family, two Smith monuments and one unidentified. The old rectory dates from around 1820. South road Methodist Church hall is home to various local groups including the Timsbury Ladies Choir. Tabor Free Methodist Church occupies a fine building of local stone on North Road. Its records show that the stained glass windows, the pews and the entrance screens were designed and made within the village. It was established as a church in 1865. In 1930 the then trustees decided against joining the Methodist Union and Tabor remains a free church under the control of the local trustees. The former Christadelphian church has been converted into housing.

The village currently (2010) maintains a pre-school and primary school, a village hall and Youth club hall. The Conygre hall is used for village meetings, shows including antique fairs, flower shows and the village amateur dramatic society performances, local art group exhibitions and private events. It has been extended in recent years and its other uses include short mat bowling, dance classes and also the local polling station. There is also a community-run library.

The Conygre hall was built in 1973 and took its name from the Upper Conygre pit previously located opposite. Its cost was financed equally by local subscription, and the generosity of Major B.G.S. Cayzer, who was the second son of the Union Castle Shipping Line family and owned Parish's House. It is located in a former Miners welfare field purchased for their benefit and financed by a levy of a penny per ton of all coal mined in the local area. There are facilities for recreation and sport, including two football pitches, cricket and rugby. There are two tennis courts and a well equipped enclosed children's play park area.

There is a social hall for a branch of the British Legion in Newmans Lane, a YMCA building and one public house, the Seven Stars, on North Road.

Statistical data (2007) provided by Bath and North East Somerset local council shows that Timsbury, (area 90 in the data), has above average access to local Authority services, has good health care facilities, a lower than average crime rate and good environmental living standards. Timsbury has its own pharmacy in the High Street and doctors' surgery in St Marys Close.

== Notable residents ==
- Jimmy Bridges (1887–1966), cricketer who played 216 First-class cricket games for Somerset.
- Fred Wedlock (1942–2010), folk singer and entertainer
- Anthony Head (1954–2026), an actor and singer, primarily in musical theatre
- Susan Chilcott (1963–2003) classical soprano singer, grew up in the village.
- Mark Boyle (born 1979), author and writes for the newspaper The Guardian
