= Clutton Rural District =

Former local government area in the UK

Coordinates: 51.331°N 2.540°W

- Population
  - 1911: 18,460
  - 1961: 17,925
- History
  - Created: 1894
  - Abolished: 1974
- Status: Rural district

Clutton was a rural district in Somerset, England, from 1894 to 1974.

It was created in 1894 under the Local Government Act 1894 as a successor to the rural sanitary district.

In 1974 it was abolished under the Local Government Act 1972. The parishes in the district became part of the Non-metropolitan district of Wansdyke in the newly formed County of Avon.

Avon was itself abolished in 1996 and the administration of Clutton became the responsibility of the new unitary authority of Bath and North East Somerset (BANES).

BANES took over the parishes of Cameley, Chelwood, Chew Magna, Chew Stoke, Clutton, Compton Martin, East Harptree, Farmborough, Farrington Gurney, High Littleton, Hinton Blewett, Nempnett Thrubwell, Norton Malreward, Paulton, Publow, Stanton Drew, Stowey-Sutton, Timsbury, Ubley and West Harptree.

The parishes of Chilcompton, Litton and Ston Easton became the responsibility of the Mendip Council (within Somerset County Council).
