= Church of St Mary the Virgin, Stanton Drew =

Church in Somerset, England

Church of St Mary the Virgin
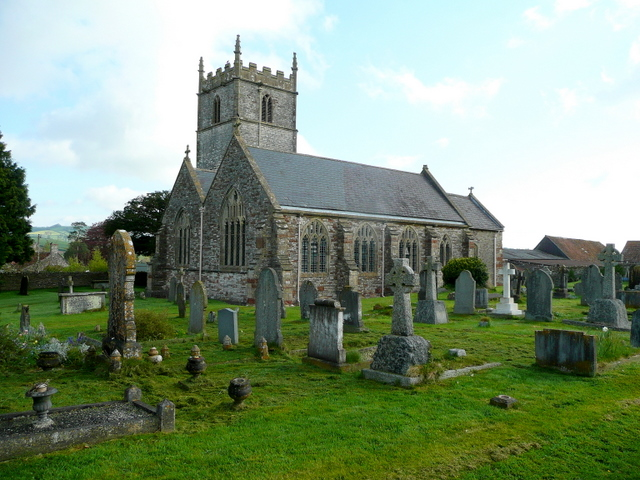

- Location within Somerset
- 51°21′57″N 2°34′45″W
- Location: Stanton Drew, Somerset, England

History
- Built: 13th century

Listed Building – Grade II*
- Official name: Church of St. Mary
- Designated: 21 September 1960
- Reference no.: 1136209

The Anglican Church of St Mary the Virgin in Stanton Drew, Somerset, England, was built in the 13th century. It is a Grade II* listed building.

In the north aisle is the Norman bowl of the font and further east the small turret steps behind a glass door that in earlier times led up into a rood loft. Although parts date from the 13th and 14th centuries the interior, as it is seen today, shows the work that was carried out in 1847 when the south, west and north walls were rebuilt except a portion east from the Lady Chapel. The nave and tower arches were reconstructed in the 15th century.

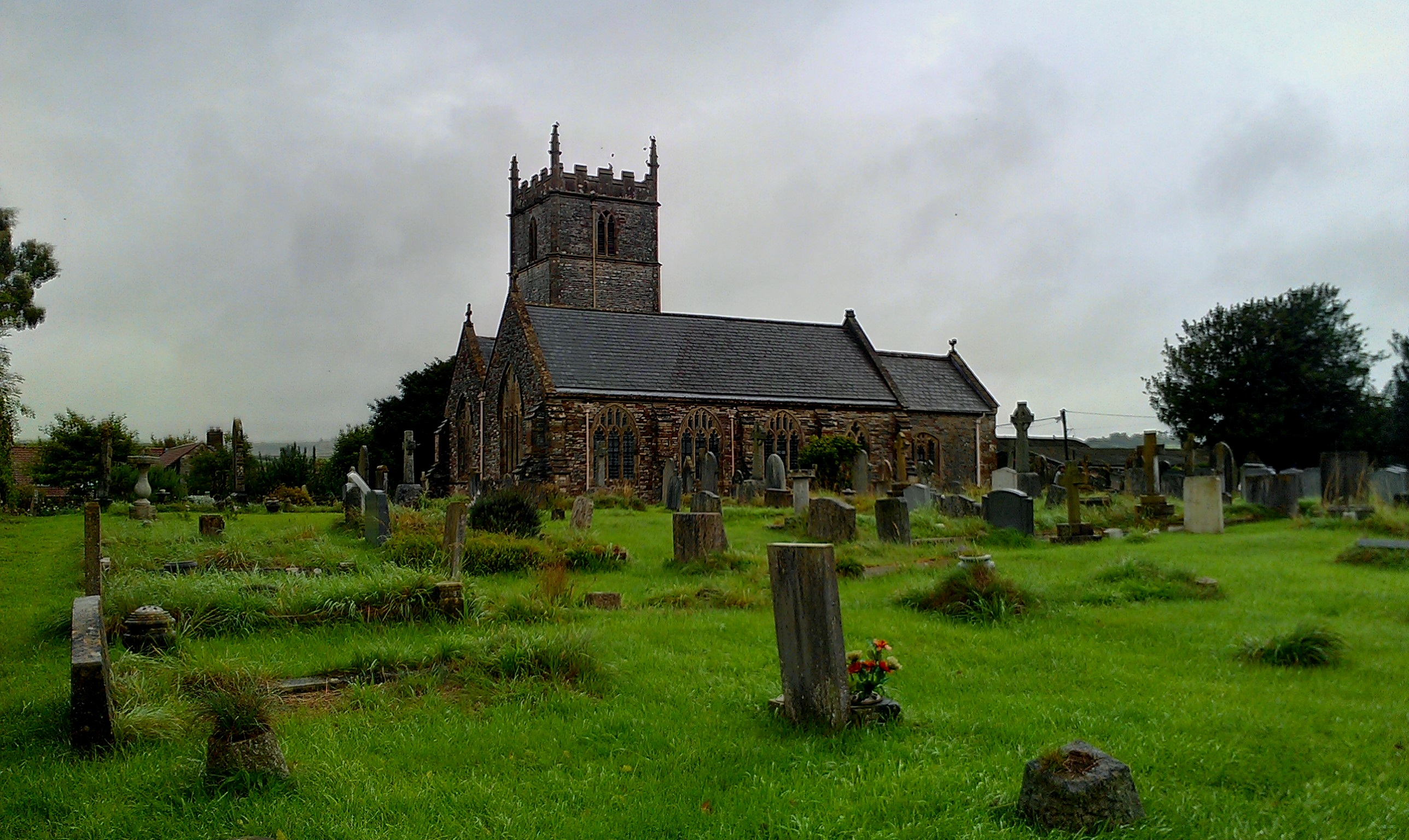
The church in its churchyard

The Hazle, Wight Preston and several other unidentified monuments in the churchyard are also listed, along with the piers, gates and overthrow at the north-east entrance to churchyard.

== See also ==
- List of ecclesiastical parishes in the Diocese of Bath and Wells
