= List of tourist attractions in Somerset =

Key
	Abbey/Priory/Cathedral
Accessible open space	Accessible open space
	Amusement/Theme Park
	Castle
Country Park	Country Park
	English Heritage
	Forestry Commission
Heritage railway	Heritage railway
Historic house	Historic House
Places of Worship	Places of Worship
Museum (free) Museum	Museum (free/not free)
National Trust	National Trust
	Theatre
	Zoo

Tourist attractions in the English county of Somerset include:

- Blake Museum
- American Museum in Britain
- Bakelite Museum
- Barrington Court
- Bath Abbey
- Bath Assembly Rooms
- Bath Postal Museum
- Beckford's Tower
- Bishop's Palace, Wells
- Blagdon Lake
- Brean Down Fort
- Brean Leisure Park
- Bridgwater and Taunton Canal
- Bristol Channel
- Building of Bath Collection
- Burrow Hill Cider Farm
- Cadbury Castle
- Chalice Well
- Cheddar Gorge
- Chew Valley Lake
- Clatworthy Reservoir
- Claverton Pumping Station
- Cleeve Abbey
- Clevedon Court
- Clevedon Pier
- Clifton Suspension Bridge
- Coleridge Cottage Netherstowey
- National Cycle Route 24 (Colliers Way)
- Cothay Manor
- County Ground, Taunton
- Cricket St Thomas
- Dunster Doll Museum
- Dunster Castle
- Dunster Working Watermill
- East Lambrook Manor gardens
- East Somerset Railway
- Ebbor Gorge
- Exmoor
- Farleigh Hungerford Castle
- Fashion Museum
- Fleet Air Arm Museum, RNAS Yeovilton
- Folly Farm, Stowey
- Fyne Court
- Gartell Light Railway
- Georgian Bath
- Glastonbury Abbey
- Glastonbury Tor
- Glastonbury Tribunal
- The Grand Pier Weston-super-Mare
- Hadspen house and garden
- Halswell House, Goathurst
- Ham Hill
- Haynes International Motor Museum
- Herschel Museum of Astronomy
- Helicopter Museum, Weston-super-Mare
- Holburne Museum of Art
- Holnicote Estate
- Jane Austen Centre
- Kennet and Avon Canal
- King John's Hunting Lodge Axbridge
- Lambretta Scooter Museum
- Lytes Cary
- Market House Museum, Watchet
- Mendip Hills AONB
- Mid-Somerset Show
- Montacute House
- Muchelney Abbey
- Museum of Bath at Work
- Museum of East Asian Art
- Museum of Somerset
- Nettlecombe Court
- Noah's Ark Zoo Farm
- Nunney Castle
- Peat Moors Centre
- Priest's House Muchelney
- Prior Park Bath
- Quantock Hills AONB
- Radstock Museum
- River Avon
- River Chew
- Roman Baths Bath
- The Shoe Museum, Street
- Somerset and Dorset Joint Railway
- Somerset Brick and Tile Museum,
- Somerset Coal Canal
- Museum of Somerset
- Somerset Levels
- Somerset Military Museum
- Somerset Rural Life Museum
- Somerset Space Walk
- South West Coast Path
- Stanton Drew stone circles
- Stembridge Mill, High Ham
- Stoke sub Hamdon Priory
- Taunton Stop Line
- Tintinhull Garden
- Treasurer's House Martock
- Tyntesfield
- Victoria Art Gallery
- Watchet Boat Museum
- Wellington Monument
- Wellington Museum
- Wells and Mendip Museum
- Wells Cathedral
- West Country Carnival
- West Pennard Court Barn
- West Somerset Rural Life Museum and Victorian School
- West Somerset Railway
- Weston Museum
- Westonzoyland Pumping Station Museum
- Willows and Wetlands Visitor Centre
- Wimbleball Reservoir
- Wookey Hole Caves

== See also ==
- Category:Tourist attractions in Somerset
