= Bathavon Rural District =

Local government area in the UK

- Area
  - 1933: 46,276 acres (187.27 km^{2})
  - 1971: 39,121 acres (158.32 km^{2})
- History
  - Created: 1933
  - Abolished: 1974
- Status: Rural district

Bathavon was a rural district in Somerset, England, from 1933 to 1974.

It was created in 1933 with the abolition of Bath Rural District and Keynsham Rural District. Somerset County Council proposed that the amalgamated district be named 'Bath-Keynsham', but 'Bathavon' was chosen by the Ministry of Health.

On creation it contained the parishes of Bathampton, Batheaston, Bathford, Camerton, Charlcombe, Claverton, Combe Hay, Compton Dando, Corston, Dunkerton, Englishcombe, Freshford, Hinton Charterhouse, Kelston, Keynsham, Marksbury, Monkton Combe, Newton St Loe, North Stoke, Peasedown St John, Priston, Saltford, Shoscombe, South Stoke, St Catherine, Swainswick, Wellow, Weston and Whitchurch.

As early as 1935 the parishes of Keynsham and Saltford sought to be separated from the rural district and become an urban district. Somerset County Council approved the scheme, which was opposed by Bathavon RDC. Following an inquiry by a Ministry of Health inspector, the Keynsham Urban District separated from the rural district on 1 April 1938.

In 1974 Bathavon Rural District was abolished under the Local Government Act 1972, becoming part of Wansdyke District which itself was abolished in 1996 with the creation of Bath and North East Somerset.
