= Hundred of Chewton =

Historical Hundred of Somerset, England

Chewton Hundred
- Area
  - 1870: 32,158 acres (13,014 ha)
- Population
  - 1870: 12,112
- History
  - Created: unknown
- Status: Hundred
- Subdivisions
  - Type: Parishes

The Hundred of Chewton is one of the 40 historical Hundreds in the ceremonial county of Somerset, England, dating from the Anglo-Saxon era before the Norman conquest, although exact dates are unknown. Each hundred had a "fyrd" (the local defence force) and a court which maintained the frankpledge system. Hundreds also formed units for the collection of taxes. The role of the hundred court was described in the Dooms (laws) of King Edgar. The name of the hundred was normally that of its meeting-place.

The Hundred of Chewton consisted of the ancient parishes of: Brockley, Cameley, Chewton Mendip, Chilcompton, Compton Martin, Emborough, Farrington Gurney, West Harptree, Hinton Blewett, Kingston Seymour, High Littleton, Midsomer Norton, Paulton, Ston Easton, and Ubley. In 1870 it had a population of 12,112 and covered 32,158 acres (13,014 ha).

The importance of the hundred courts declined from the 17th century. By the 19th century several different single-purpose subdivisions of counties, such as poor law unions, sanitary districts and highway districts, sprang up, filling the administrative role previously played by parishes and hundreds. Although the hundreds have never been formally abolished, their functions ended with the establishment of county courts in 1867 and the introduction of districts by the Local Government Act 1894.
