= Museum of East Asian Art, Bath =

Museum in Bath, Somerset, England

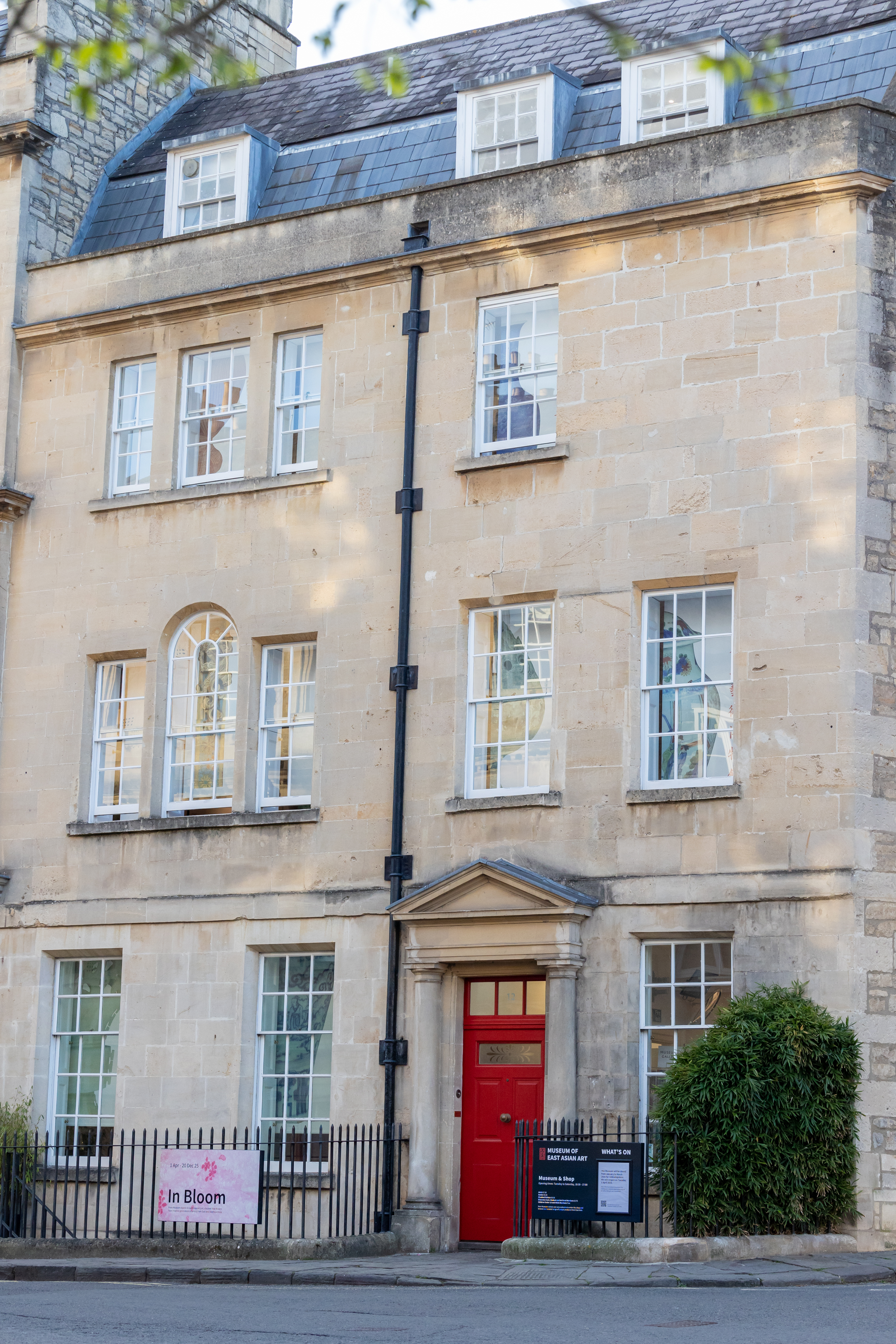
Museum of East Asian Art

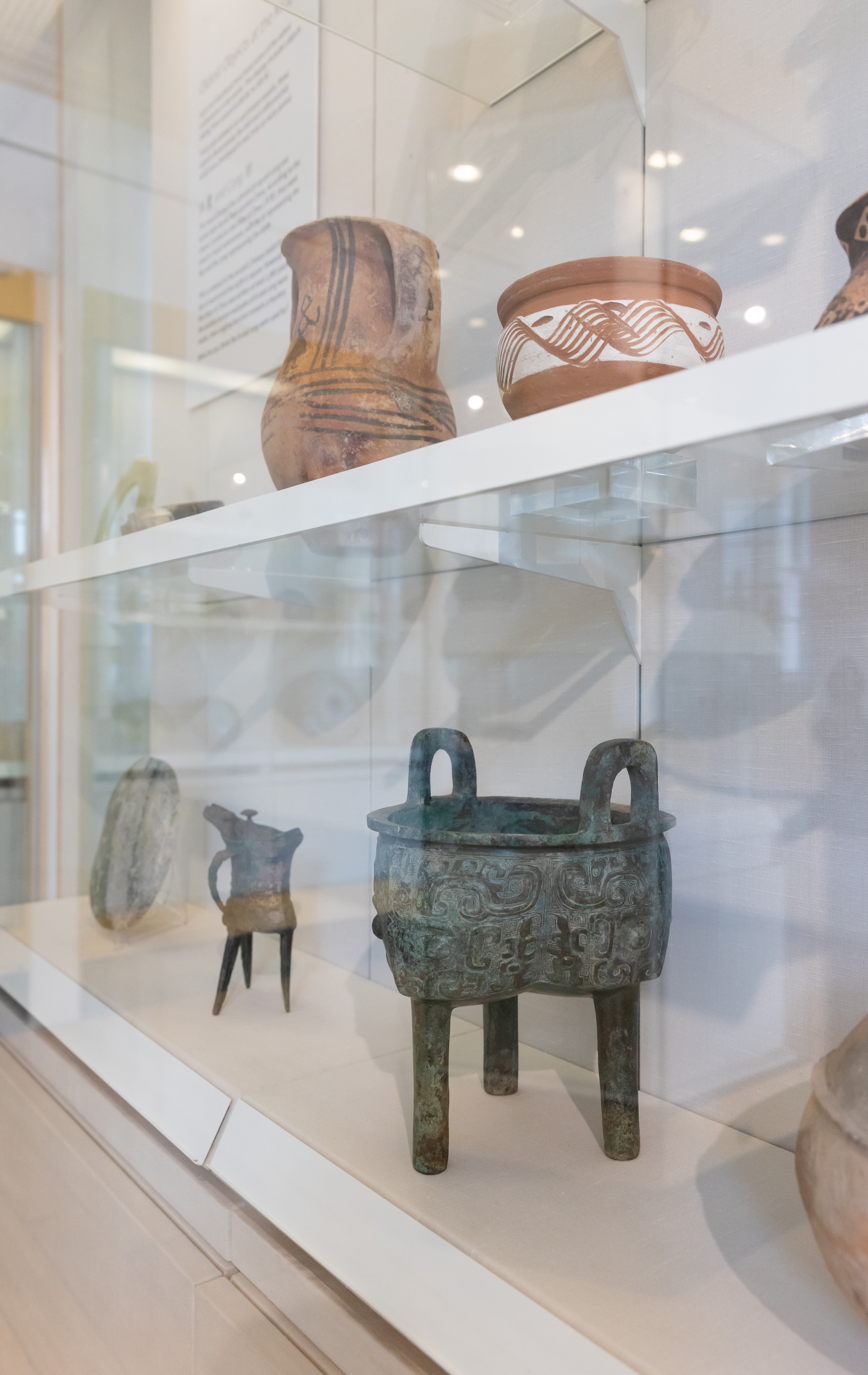
Oldest objects at the Museum of East Asian Art

The Museum of East Asian Art or MEAA is an art museum located in Bath, Somerset, England.

Located in central Bath, the Museum of East Asian Art is situated in a restored Georgian town house. The collection housed there includes ceramics, jades, bronzes and bamboo carvings and other artefacts, from China, Japan, Korea and Southeast Asia. It is the only museum in the United Kingdom dedicated solely to arts and cultures of East and Southeast Asia.

It houses a collection of almost 2,000 objects, ranging in date from c.5000 BCE to the present day. The Museum's collection started from the collection of Brian McElney, a retired solicitor who practised in Hong Kong for over 35 years, and has since been expanded.

== History ==
The Museum was founded by Brian McElney. McElney spent his entire working life practising law in Hong Kong and it was during this time that he was drawn to East Asian and especially Chinese art. In 1958, he bought his first piece, an ivory goat and kid, after which Brian's collection grew to include jades, ceramics, scholar's studio objects and bronzes.

After his retirement from law in 1983, McElney returned to England and procured the funds for the restoration and refurbishment of the Georgian building that houses the Museum, founding the Museum itself in 1990. McElney donated his private collection to form the Museum, which he had created as a UK educational charity, opening to the public in 1993. Although the bulk of the objects come from this original donation, new donations and acquisitions have been made over the years.

Since opening to the public in April 1993, the Museum has become one of the most extensive collections of East Asian art outside London, and it is the only museum dedicated solely to the arts and cultures of East and Southeast Asia within the UK. With a collection of almost 2,000 objects, ranging in date from c.5000 BCE to the present day, the Museum offers its visitors an insight into the art and cultures of China, Japan, Korea and Southeast Asia. Home to one of the most comprehensive jade collections in the UK, the collection uncovers the skill of East Asian craftsmanship.

== Relationship with Bath ==
Bath and the West Country also have historical links to China. The trade in Chinese tea and porcelain was one of the most valued aspects of commerce in 18th century England and Bath was the second most popular resort after London for these activities. By the mid-18th century tea drinking had become an important part in the city's social life. This historical relationship is illustrated by the Museum's collection of Armorial Porcelain in the Ceramics Gallery, with the pieces on display having been made for prominent families in 18th century Bath and the surrounding region. This includes the Pratt Family Tureen which was purchased with funding from the Museums, Libraries and Archives Council (MLA), the Victoria and Albert Museum (V&A), and The Art Fund charity.

== Collection ==
The Museum of East Asian Art's permanent collection of ceramics, jades, bronzes and bamboo carvings and more are based over the two upper galleries of the Museum. These galleries house the bulk of their almost 2,000 objects, ranging in date from c.5000 BCE to the present day.

The Museum hosts regular temporary exhibitions and has a full event programme that runs alongside these. In 2008 the Museum won a Learning Experience Award for their "Season of Tibet" exhibitions, one of their best received exhibition and event series to date. The exhibition of contemporary papercuts, hosted in 2010 to coincide with the Lunar New Year, was so popular with the public that it was extended.

The Museum has also been involved with external exhibitions and is one of the Museum partners on the travelling exhibition organised by the National Geographic Society, which includes almost 100 items from the Museum's collection. Whilst on the Oman leg of the tour, the exhibition was visited by the United Nations Secretary General Ban Ki-moon, who expressed an interest in having the exhibition visit the United Nations Headquarters in New York.

The Museum of East Asian Art has a full quarterly events programme, hosting a range of events on and off site which have included a talk by the Antiques Roadshow's Lars Tharp, and Bath's first East Asian Film Festival.

== 2018 burglary ==
At 1:20 am on April 17, 2018, four men broke into the museum and stole 48 objects. Items stolen included 22 jades, 10 ceramics, and a Tang era marriage mirror. Due to the items taken and the speed of the burglary, police suspected that items were "stolen to order." The museum closed following the burglary and reopened to the public on May 3, 2018. In May 2019, it was announced that 18 damaged objects had been returned by the Avon and Somerset police.
