= A368 road =

Road in England

A368

Major junctions
- North East end: Marksbury; 51.3571°N 2.4843°W
- A39; A37; A38 A371
- South West end: Banwell; 51.3274°N 2.8641°W

Location
- Country: United Kingdom

Road network
- Roads in the United Kingdom; Motorways; A and B road zones

The A368 is a part primary status A road in North Somerset, England. It runs from Marksbury (near Bath) to Banwell (near Weston-super-Mare) along the northern edge of the Mendip Hills and past the reservoir at Chew Valley Lake.

== Route ==
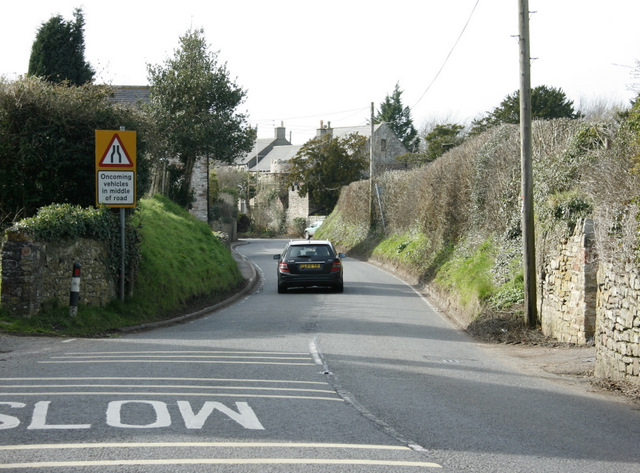
The A368 at Chelwood photographed March 2009.

The road runs through the village of Chelwood, where there is a roundabout for the junction with the A37, then via the village of Bishop Sutton to the large reservoir at Chew Valley Lake before crossing the B3114 at West Harptree.

It then runs via Compton Martin to another smaller reservoir at Blagdon Lake. At Burrington, there is a turning for the B3134 which leads through Burrington Combe. The road crosses the A38 at traffic lights just west of Churchill, and goes through Sandford before ending at Banwell on the A371.
