= North East Somerset and Hanham =

UK Parliament constituency (since 2024)

- County constituency for the House of Commons
- Boundary of North East Somerset and Hanham in South West England
- County: Somerset and Gloucestershire
- Electorate: 73,113 (2023)
- Major settlements: Hanham; Keynsham

Current constituency
- Created: 2024
- Member of Parliament: Dan Norris (Independent)
- Seats: One
- Created from: North East Somerset; Kingswood

North East Somerset and Hanham is a constituency of the House of Commons in the UK Parliament. Further to the completion of the 2023 review of Westminster constituencies, it was first contested in the 2024 general election. It is currently represented by Dan Norris, who sat as a member of the Labour Party before his suspension in April 2025.

== Constituency profile ==
North East Somerset and Hanham is a constituency in South West England covering parts of Somerset and Gloucestershire. It includes the suburban neighbourhoods of Hanham and Oldland—which form part of Bristol's wider urban area but lie outside the city's official boundaries—and the rural area to the south of Bristol, including the town of Keynsham and the villages of Saltford and Paulton.

Keynsham is a historic, affluent market town that houses many commuters to the nearby cities of Bristol and Bath. Hanham and Oldland are wealthy and suburban in character with many detached and semi-detached properties. The south of the constituency around Paulton and Timsbury is part of the Somerset coalfield, one of the small number of former coal mining areas in Southern England. House prices across the constituency are generally higher than the regional and national averages.

North East Somerset and Hanham has a large retired population. In general, residents have average levels of education and high rates of homeownership. Household income is above average and the child poverty rate is around half the UK-wide figure. A high proportion of residents work in the retail, education and construction sectors, and the percentage claiming unemployment benefits is very low. White people made up 96% of the population at the 2021 census.

At the local council level, most of Keynsham and the rural areas are represented by Liberal Democrats, Paulton by Labour Party councillors and Hanham and Oldland mostly by Conservatives. An estimated 54% of voters in North East Somerset and Hanham supported leaving the European Union in the 2016 referendum, marginally higher than the UK-wide figure of 52%.

== Boundaries ==
Map of boundaries from 2024

The seat is composed of the following (as they existed on 1 December 2020):

- The District of Bath and North East Somerset wards of: Chew Valley; Clutton & Farmborough; High Littleton; Keynsham East; Keynsham North; Keynsham South; Mendip; Paulton; Publow & Whitchurch; Saltford; Timsbury.
- The District of South Gloucestershire wards of: Bitton & Oldland Common; Hanham; Longwell Green; Parkwall & Warmley.

The following areas of Somerset and Gloucestershire make up the constituency:

- Keynsham and rural areas to the south, comprising about 55% of the abolished North East Somerset constituency
- Hanham and southern-most areas of South Gloucestershire, comprising about 45% of the abolished Kingswood constituency

== Members of Parliament ==
Election	Member	Party	Notes
2024	Dan Norris	Labour	
2025	Dan Norris	Independent	Whip suspended after arrest on suspicion of rape and child sex offences

== Elections ==
=== Elections in the 2020s ===
General election 2024: North East Somerset and Hanham
Party	Candidate	Votes	%	±%
Labour	Dan Norris	20,739	40.6	+14.4
Conservative	Jacob Rees-Mogg	15,420	30.2	−24.5
Reform	Paul MacDonnell	7,424	14.5	N/A
Liberal Democrats	Dine Romero	3,878	7.6	−7.4
Green	Edmund Cannon	3,222	6.3	+3.9
Independent	Nicholas Hales	231	0.5	N/A
Monster Raving Loony	Barmy Brunch	211	0.4	N/A
Majority		5,319	10.4	N/A
Turnout		51,125	69.2	−9.4
Registered electors		73,887		
Labour notional gain from Conservative		Swing	▲19.5	

Notional results are those of the 2019 election. There was a by-election in Kingswood, one of the preceding constituencies, in February 2024, resulting in a gain from the Conservatives; the winning candidate, Damien Egan, subsequently won another successor constituency, Bristol North East, in the 2024 general election.

=== Elections in the 2010s ===
2019 notional result
Party	Vote	%
Conservative	31,435	54.7
Labour	15,046	26.2
Liberal Democrats	8,625	15.0
Green	1,370	2.4
Others	961	1.7
Turnout	57,437	78.6
Electorate	73,113	

== See also ==
- Parliamentary constituencies in Avon
