= Great Western Ambulance Service =

Former NHS emergency services trust

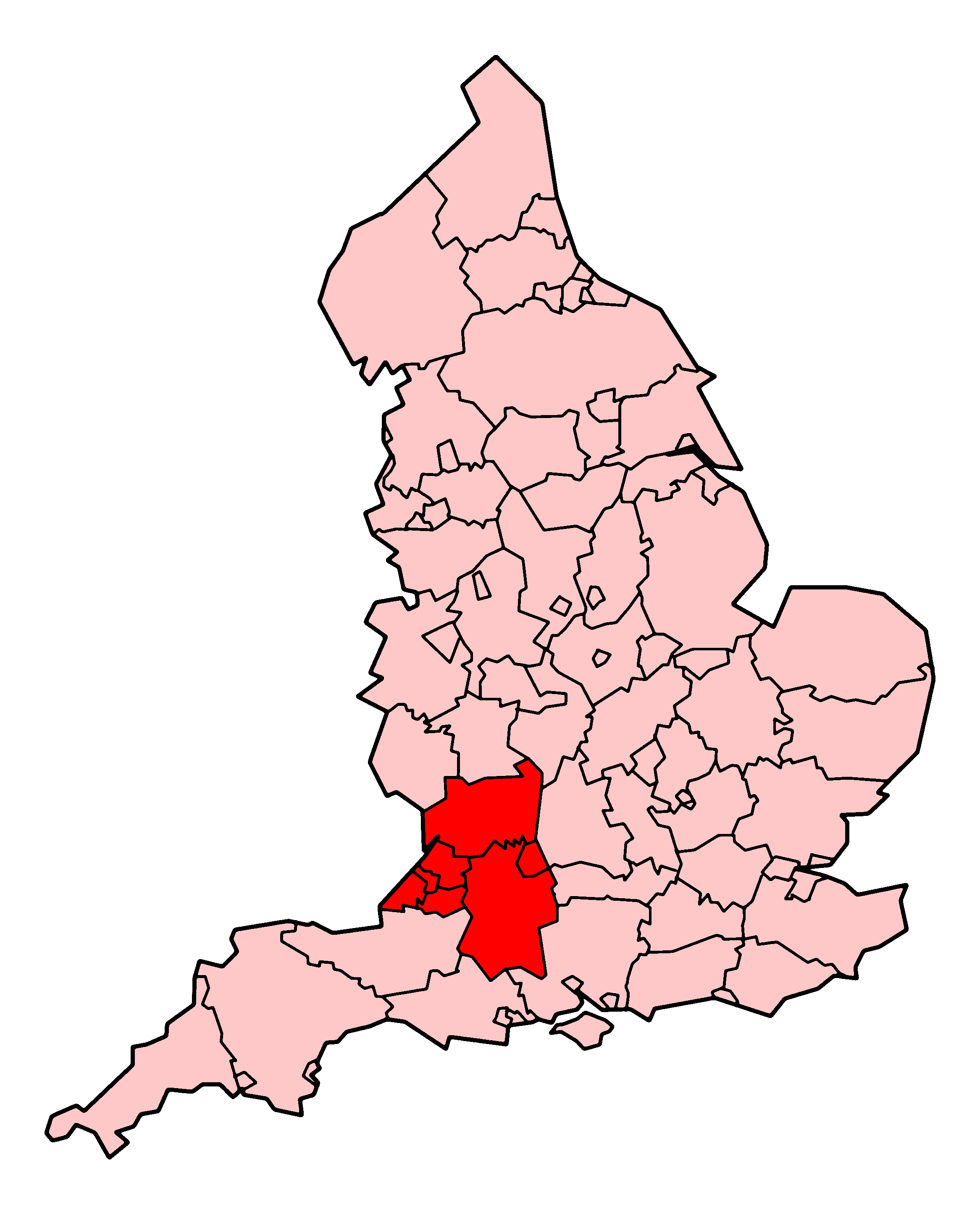
Map of the Great Western Ambulance Service's coverage

The Great Western Ambulance Service NHS Trust (GWAS) was a National Health Service (NHS) trust which provided emergency and non-emergency patient transport services to Bath and North East Somerset, Bristol, Gloucestershire, North Somerset, Swindon and Wiltshire, in South West England. It was formed on 1 April 2006 by the merger of the Avon, Gloucestershire and Wiltshire ambulance services. The ambulance service was acquired by neighbouring Foundation Trust South Western Ambulance Service (SWASFT) on 1 February 2013.

It was one of the NHS ambulance services trusts providing England with free emergency medical services, receiving government funding for its role.

== Operations ==
The trust headquarters was at Jenner House, Chippenham, Wiltshire. The trust had one main call handling emergency operations centre (EOC) and two dispatch centres.

== History ==
Formed on 1 April 2006 by the merger of the Avon, Gloucestershire and Wiltshire ambulance services, the trust had a difficult start, marked by redundancies, closure of its training centre and the threat of ambulance station closures; though in the end, only one station was closed, at Newent, Gloucestershire.

This caused strained industrial relations with its recognised union, UNISON, and criticism in local media. From the date of merger, GWAS struggled to achieve the Department of Health's key performance indicators. In 2007–2008 the trust lost two contracts for non-emergency patient transport services (PTS) to private contractors. Many ambulance shifts were covered by private agencies.

In September 2008, the chief executive, Tim Lynch, resigned. He was replaced by an interim chief executive, Anthony Marsh, from West Midlands Ambulance Service. Marsh identified a lack of operational leadership and a "competition of priorities" within management and removed two directors: the director of operations and director of corporate development.

In February 2009, a ceremony was held to present almost 60 staff, partner agencies and members of the public with Chief Executive Commendations.

In September 2010, a specialist unit, the Hazardous Area Response Team (HART), was established and went live after months of preparation and training. This unit of 32 paramedics was trained to respond to complex or large incidents involving fire, chemicals, biological or nuclear risks, collapsed buildings, cliff or heights, confined spaces, water or firearms incidents. The GWAS HART was one of the last parts of the national scheme to be established; a base was built for the unit in Filton, North Bristol.

In the summer of 2010, the regional NHS announced that after a competitive tendering process, GWAS had secured the major patient transport service contract for the former Avon area, representing an estimated three-quarters of non-emergency patient journeys in the region. The revamped service, operating 24/7, went live on 1 October 2010.

In 2010, the trust board recommended the closure of at least one county's control room, and gave the go-ahead to an "Estates Review" to prepare the trust for closure of local ambulance stations.

In 2009, David Whiting, previously director of operations at East Midlands Ambulance Service, was appointed as Chief Executive. He announced his resignation in November 2010, having served just nineteen months, a situation the union described as "difficult".

=== Industrial action ===
Whiting's resignation came at the height of an industrial dispute as the trust attempted to adjust rota patterns, rest breaks and shift times, which caused staff to be concerned about safety and welfare of patients and colleagues. In December 2010, the trust announced another interim Chief Executive, Martin Flaherty of the London Ambulance Service.

At the beginning of January 2011, UNISON (the only approved union within GWAS until January 2011, when the GMB was accepted) announced the results of a ballot for industrial action. From those that voted, the result was 96% in favour of taking industrial action as a form of protest against the changes implemented during 2010.

=== Successor ===
Later in 2011, plans were announced for the merger of GWAS with South Western Ambulance Service (SWASFT) and on 1 February 2013, all of the GWAS services, vehicles and staff were transferred over to SWASFT.

== Wiltshire Emergency Services project ==
The Wiltshire branch of GWAS was a member of the WES project, a collaboration of emergency services in Wiltshire which ran from 1998 until the early 2010s. The project saw the construction of the WES building at Wiltshire Police headquarters in Devizes and the relocation of all three emergency services control centres into that one emergency control centre where information could be shared instantly among them. The project also oversaw the sharing of stations at Bradford-on-Avon and Mere, the sharing of Wiltshire Air Ambulance, and the training of fire and rescue crews to use defibrillators on occasions when the ambulance service is busy.

GWAS was also supported in Wiltshire by a group of volunteer doctors ('SWIFT Medics') who respond from home, in their own time, to incidents involving seriously sick or injured patients throughout the county. The doctors involved are all either senior GPs or hospital clinicians, who provide their time and expertise for free. The specially trained pre-hospital care doctors are able to supplement the skills of paramedics and other ambulance staff (for example with advanced decision making, administration of strong painkilling drugs, pre-hospital anaesthesia and certain surgical procedures normally carried out in hospital). The pre-hospital care doctor team receive no funding from either the government or GWAS, and rely entirely on charitable donations and fundraising to pay for their drugs, kit and training. All the doctors use their own cars and are permitted to respond with blue lights and sirens, having undergone an intensive three-week police driver training course with Wiltshire Police. The team works closely with the Wiltshire Air Ambulance and the GWAS Air Ambulance. From 2011, SWIFT doctors were tasked to a job either by the Emergency Operations Centre in Devizes or following a direct request from ambulance personnel at the scene of a serious incident.

== Air ambulances ==
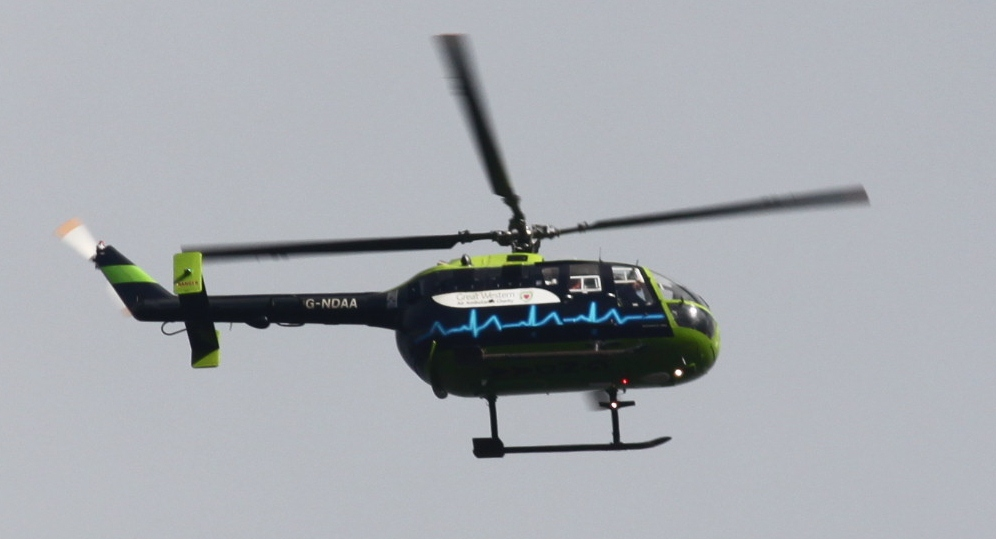
Air Ambulance G-NDAA

GWAS was able to deploy the services of three air ambulance units. The Midlands Air Ambulance operates from Strensham and covers GWAS' northern areas. The Wiltshire Air Ambulance operated from the police HQ at Devizes, although it has since moved. The Great Western Air Ambulance was based at Filton Airfield, Bristol, although it too has since moved. All three continue to support SWASFT.

== See also ==
- Emergency medical services in the United Kingdom
