= Wansdyke (district) =

Former non-metropolitan district in England

Coordinates: 51.4163°N 2.4988°W

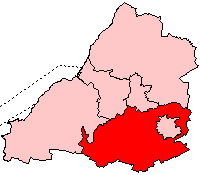
- Area
  - 1974: 79,901 acres (323.35 km^{2})
- Population
  - 1973: 72,560
  - 1992: 80,700
- History
  - Created: 1974
  - Abolished: 1996
  - Succeeded by: Bath and North East Somerset
- Status: non-metropolitan district
  - HQ: Keynsham

Wansdyke was a non-metropolitan district within the County of Avon west of England from 1974 to 1996.

The district was formed by the Local Government Act 1972 on 1 April 1974 as part of a reform of local authorities throughout England and Wales. Under the reorganisation, the area surrounding the cities of Bath and Bristol was formed into the new county of Avon, named after the river that passes through the area. The county was divided into six districts, one of which was formed from the areas of the Keynsham and Norton-Radstock urban districts, Bathavon Rural District and part of Clutton Rural District in Somerset. The district was named after the Wansdyke earthwork.

Following a review by the Local Government Commission for England, both the County of Avon and District of Wansdyke were abolished on 1 April 1996. Wansdyke was merged with neighbouring City of Bath to form the unitary authority of Bath and North East Somerset.

The Parliamentary constituency of Wansdyke, covering a similar but not identical area, was replaced at the 2010 general election when it was split and merged into the North East Somerset and Kingswood constituencies.

== See also ==
- Wansdyke District Council elections
