= Trading Standards =

Departments of UK local authorities enforcing consumer protection laws

Trading Standards are the local authority departments with the United Kingdom, formerly known as Weights and Measures, that enforce consumer protection legislation.

Sometimes, the Trading Standards enforcement functions of a local authority are performed by part of a larger department which enforces a wide range of other legislation: environmental health, health and safety, licensing and so on. These departments investigate commercial organisations that trade outside the law or in unethical ways. They attempt to remedy breaches by advice or by formal enforcement action.

Trading Standards services also offer Primary Authority Partnerships whereby a business can form a legal partnership with a regulator in order to obtain assured advice and support with compliance.

== History ==
They were originally labelled as Weights and Measures Departments because their primary function was to maintain the integrity of commercial weighing and measuring by routine testing of equipment and goods. A wide range of other legislation was allocated to them as time went on.

== Function ==
They now deal with more diverse issues under a wide variety of Acts, Orders and Codes of Practice, as set out by central government, working with a number of other regulatory bodies such as the Food Standards Agency and the Office for Product Safety and Standards. Such legislation includes the Consumer Protection from Unfair Trading Regulations 2008, the Consumer Protection Act 1987, the Food Safety Act 1990, the Price Marking Order 2004 and the Consumer Rights Act 2015. Trading Standards also work with APHA and DEFRA to ensure disease controls are in place protecting residents and agriculture in the UK.

Recent priorities include prevention of sales of counterfeit goods, sales of tobacco and alcohol to under-age buyers, and action to prevent exploitation of vulnerable consumers by scams and doorstep crime. In 2017, the Trading Standards of Somerset, Devon and Torbay donated 5,000 items of counterfeit clothes to the charity Planet Zero after the clothes were seized and rebranded.

Trading Standards can work together with other regulators and national supporting regulators to provide businesses with access to tailored advice and support. In 2018 Buckinghamshire and Surrey Trading Standards formed their 100th Primary Authority Partnership under this government scheme.

== National Trading Standards ==
National Trading Standards (NTS) is funded by grants from a number of government departments to provide assistance and funds to Local Authority Trading Standards for work in priority areas. NTS works through specialist national and regional teams, but does not deal with end users.

== See also ==
- Chartered Trading Standards Institute
- Office of Fair Trading
