= Anne Rees-Mogg =

British film director and teacher

Anne Rees-Mogg was an experimental film director and teacher. She served as the chair of the London Film-makers' Co-operative between 1981 and 1984. She was the older sister of the newspaper editor William Rees-Mogg and the aunt of the British politician Jacob Rees-Mogg.

== Biography ==
Anne Rees-Mogg was bought up at Cholwell House near Temple Cloud in Somerset. She served in the Women's Land Army in the Second World War.

Rees-Mogg studied at Bristol Art School and the Central School of Arts and Crafts and subsequently became a teacher at the Regent Street Polytechnic in 1951. Rees-Mogg was a lecturer in Film Studies at the Chelsea School of Art from 1964 until her death in 1984. Rees-Mogg was part of the painting department at Chelsea as film was not yet considered part of the fine arts by the college. The comedian Alexei Sayle, then a student of Rees-Mogg's at Chelsea, recalled that she "involved herself to a greater degree than the rest of the staff with her students, particularly the boys whom she collected around her so that we formed an odd little troop, wandering around accompanied by the ticking sound of our clockwork cameras". Her students saw her as more approachable than her fellow tutors Howard Hodgkin and Patrick Caulfield. Rees-Mogg regularly drove her students in her brown Ford Escort estate, with Sayle recalling that she rarely changed out of third gear, so she "travelled everywhere at thirty miles-an-hour in a cloud of smoke and disintegrating clutch".

During her tenure from 1981 to 1984, Rees-Mogg held the position of chair and Director at the London Film-makers' Co-operative. Rees-Mogg began making experimental films late in life and used 16 mm film. She was regarded as an avant-garde filmmaker in Britain. Her films concerned relationships and the notions of time and memory. They often featured members of her family and her friends.

Rees-Mogg held Socialist political views in contrast to the Conservative and Roman Catholic persuasions of her family. She was also a supporter of Women's equality and rights for LGBT people.

Rees-Mogg was very fond of her brother's son, her nephew Jacob Rees-Mogg. He appeared in several of her films as a child alongside his siblings. Rees-Mogg once took Jacob to see Superman which Jacob later recalled that he "[couldn't] imagine that could have been her scene".

The filmmaker Anna Thew was a student of Rees-Mogg's at Chelsea, Rees-Mogg subsequently played the grandmother in Thew's film 1986 film Hilda Was a Goodlooker. Thew recalled that when she disappointed Rees-Mogg with the cut of one of her films, Rees-Mogg "raged" and "...kicked the edit room door with her plastic lamé-spangled sandals".

=== Themes ===
Thew, in her entry on Rees-Mogg in the 1995 book A Directory of British Film and Video Artists, described the "key" to Rees-Mogg's films as the "collecting phenomena" and that her films concerned "time, memory, personal relationships and the discovery of film-making". Thew likened Rees-Mogg's densely decorated house to the curated boxes of the American conceptual artist Joseph Cornell, crowded with "ivory letters, the inflatable Coca-Cola bottle, the vast collection of enamel signs and mementoes, academy leaders and old Kodak Spools, the round mirror-topped table heaped with cut glass decanter tops".

Melissa Gronlund, in a 2019 profile of Rees-Mogg for The Guardian, felt that her concerns echoed those of much later filmmakers with her focus on "personal memory [chiming] with later feminist work that took seriously everyday concerns". Rees-Mogg's "technique of collaging together memories with pop songs and her own lightly self-mocking commentary, feels contemporary".

== Work ==
Rees-Mogg's films focus on the domestic locales of her lfe, including her flat in south London, and her ancestral home Cholwell House in Somerset. Her house in north London was demolished, Rees-Mogg captured its destruction on film.

Her films frequently feature her family members and her students from the Chelsea School of Art.

Her 1980 film Transmogrification features Alexei Sayle, her student at Chelsea, as well as her nieces Emma and Charlotte Rees-Mogg who appear in Georgian dress in front of the Rees-Mogg family's ancestral home.

Jacob Rees-Mogg is shown catching butterflies in a field in her 1980 film Living Memory.

The film Grandfather's Footsteps from 1983 begins with a box of photographic negatives that Rees-Mogg found in a glass cigar box and tells the story of her grandfather, a clergyman. In the film she states that "I don't think that anyone should ever do what they are told...If you look back at obedience to fashion in writing, in painting, in film-making, it just doesn’t work. It's just always academic to do what other people think is correct". Jacob and his brother Thomas Rees-Mogg are shown playing the game Mother May I? in Grandfather's Footsteps.

== Filmography ==
- Nothing is Something (1966)
- One (1968–1969)
- A Length of Time (1970)
- Real Time (1971–1974)
- Muybridge Film (1975)
- Sentimental Journey (1977)
- Transmogrification (1980)
- Living Memory (1980)
- Macbeth a Tragedy (1983)
- Welcome/Adieu (1983)
- Grandfather's Footsteps (1983)
