= Cameley =

Village in Somerset, England

Coordinates: 51.3162°N 2.555°W

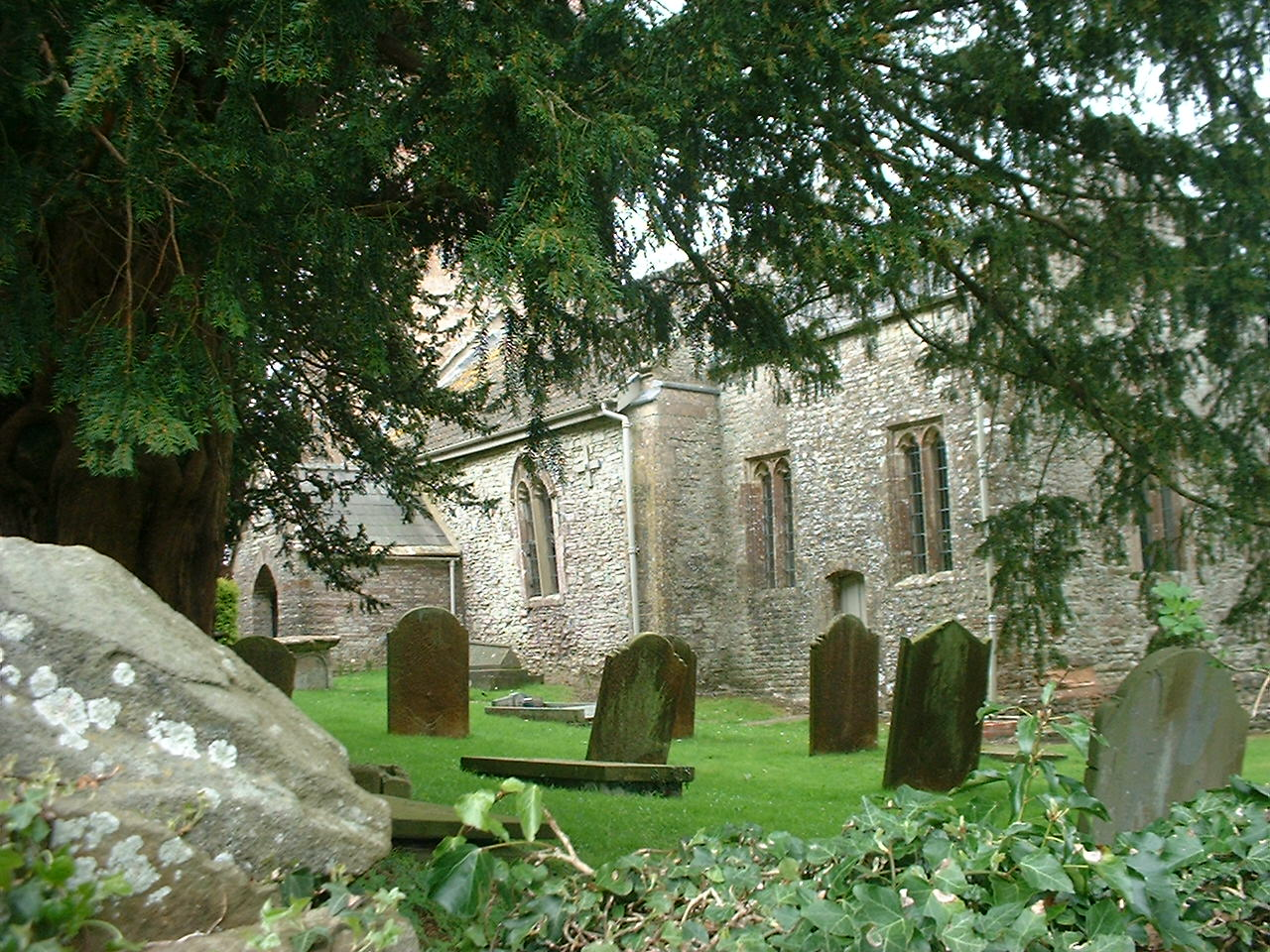
- Church of St James

- Location within Somerset
- Population: 1,292 (2011)
- OS grid reference: ST610575
- Civil parish: Temple Cloud with Cameley
- Unitary authority: Bath and North East Somerset
- Ceremonial county: Somerset
- Region: South West
- Country: England
- Sovereign state: United Kingdom
- Post town: BRISTOL
- Postcode district: BS39
- Dialling code: 01761
- Police: Avon and Somerset
- Fire: Avon
- Ambulance: South Western
- UK Parliament: North East Somerset and Hanham

Cameley is a village in the civil parish of Temple Cloud with Cameley, within the Chew Valley in Somerset, and on the northern slopes of the Mendip Hills, in the Bath and North East Somerset Council area just off the A37 road. It is located 11 miles (18 km) from Bristol, Bath and Wells. The nearest town is Midsomer Norton, which is 6 miles (10 km) away. The parish has a population of 1,292 and includes the village of Temple Cloud. The village has a primary school and nursery, Cameley CEVC Primary School & Nursery. It was graded as Good by Ofsted in 2023.

== History ==
It lies on Cam Brook. According to Robinson it was listed as Camelie in the 1086 Domesday Book and the name means 'The curved river meadow' from the Celtic cam and Old English leah.

About 1150 the manor was given to Bath Abbey by the Alnes (or d'Alneto) family. In the 13th century it was held by the Marisco family, better known for their connection with Lundy, and then passed into the control of the Knights Templar, which was confirmed in a grant of 1201. During the 13th and early 14th century the manor was again under the control of the de Marisco family.

The parish was part of the hundred of Chewton.

== Governance ==
The parish council has responsibility for local issues, including setting an annual precept (local rate) to cover the council's operating costs and producing annual accounts for public scrutiny. The parish council evaluates local planning applications and works with the local police, district council officers, and neighbourhood watch groups on matters of crime, security, and traffic. The parish council's role also includes initiating projects for the maintenance and repair of parish facilities, such as the village hall or community centre, playing fields and playgrounds, as well as consulting with the district council on the maintenance, repair, and improvement of highways, drainage, footpaths, public transport, and street cleaning. Conservation matters (including trees and listed buildings) and environmental issues are also of interest to the council.

Cameley is part of the Mendip Ward which is represented by one councillor on the unitary authority of Bath and North East Somerset which was created in 1996, as established by the Local Government Act 1992. It provides a single tier of local government with responsibility for almost all local government functions within its area including local planning and building control, local roads, council housing, environmental health, markets and fairs, refuse collection, recycling, cemeteries, crematoria, leisure services, parks, and tourism. It is also responsible for education, social services, libraries, main roads, public transport, trading standards, waste disposal and strategic planning, although fire, police and ambulance services are provided jointly with other authorities through the Avon Fire and Rescue Service, Avon and Somerset Constabulary and the Great Western Ambulance Service.

Bath and North East Somerset's area covers part of the ceremonial county of Somerset but it is administered independently of the non-metropolitan county. Its administrative headquarters is in Bath. Between 1 April 1974 and 1 April 1996, it was the Wansdyke district and the City of Bath of the county of Avon. Before 1974 the parish was part of the Clutton Rural District.

The parish is represented in the House of Commons of the Parliament of the United Kingdom as part of North East Somerset and Hanham. It elects one Member of Parliament (MP) by the first past the post system of election. It was also part of the South West England constituency of the European Parliament prior to Britain leaving the European Union in January 2020, which elected seven MEPs using the d'Hondt method of party-list proportional representation.

== Demographics ==
According to the 2001 Census the Mendip Ward (which includes West Harptree and Hinton Blewett), had 1,465 residents, living in 548 households, with an average age of 39.0 years. Of these 79% of residents describing their health as 'good', 22% of 16- to 74-year-olds had no qualifications; and the area had an unemployment rate of 1.5% of all economically active people aged 16–74. In the Index of Multiple Deprivation 2004, it was ranked at 25,387 out of 32,482 wards in England, where 1 was the most deprived LSOA and 32,482 the least deprived.

== Church ==
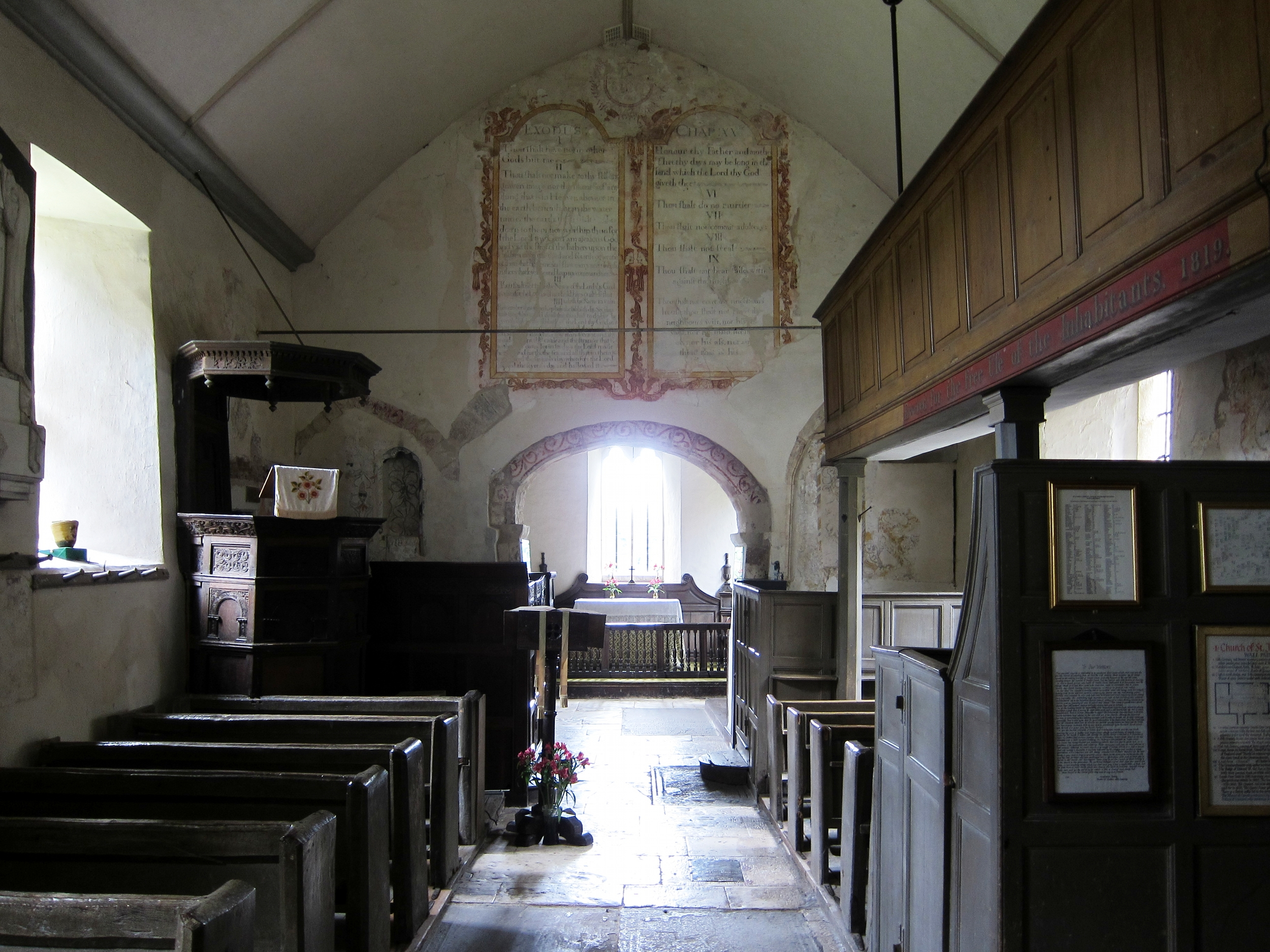
The Church of St James

The parish church is dedicated to St. James and dates from the late 12th century. The tower, probably from the 15th century with 19th-century restoration, is built of red Mendip stone which contrasts with the local blue lias limestone of the rest of the church. The tower contains a bell dating from 1779 and made by William Bilbie of the Bilbie family. There are fragments of wall paintings on the nave north and south walls. Fragments from the 12th to the 17th century have been identified, the most impressive being the fine early-17th-century Ten Commandments over the chancel arch, framed in twining leaves with cherubs' faces peering out. These remained hidden behind whitewash until the 1960s leading John Betjeman to describe it as "Rip Van Winkle's Church". The west gallery is dated 1711 but with Jacobean style balusters and attached Charles I coat of arms. The south gallery is dated 1819. There are two early-19th-century monuments on the north wall of the nave to the Rees-Mogg family of Cholwell House within the parish, and a brass plaque commemorating the nine people from the village who died in World War I. The church is surrounded by trees. It is a Grade I listed building Several of the monuments in the churchyard are Grade II listed.

== Cameley Lodge ==
Cameley Lodge is now a hotel, wedding, conference and events venue.

== Cameley Lakes ==
Cameley Lakes comprise a group of small fishing lakes immediately to the west of the village. They frequently attract small numbers of waterfowl.

== Historic estates ==
Various historic estates are situated within the parish of Cameley including:

- Cholwell, successively a seat of the families of Mogg, Wooldrige and Rees-Mogg, today Cholwell House is a nursing home.

== Grade II listed buildings ==
- Cameley House
- Cholwell House
- Humphreston House
- The Patches
- The Refuge
