= St Margaret's Church, Hinton Blewett =

Church in Somerset, England

Church of St Margaret
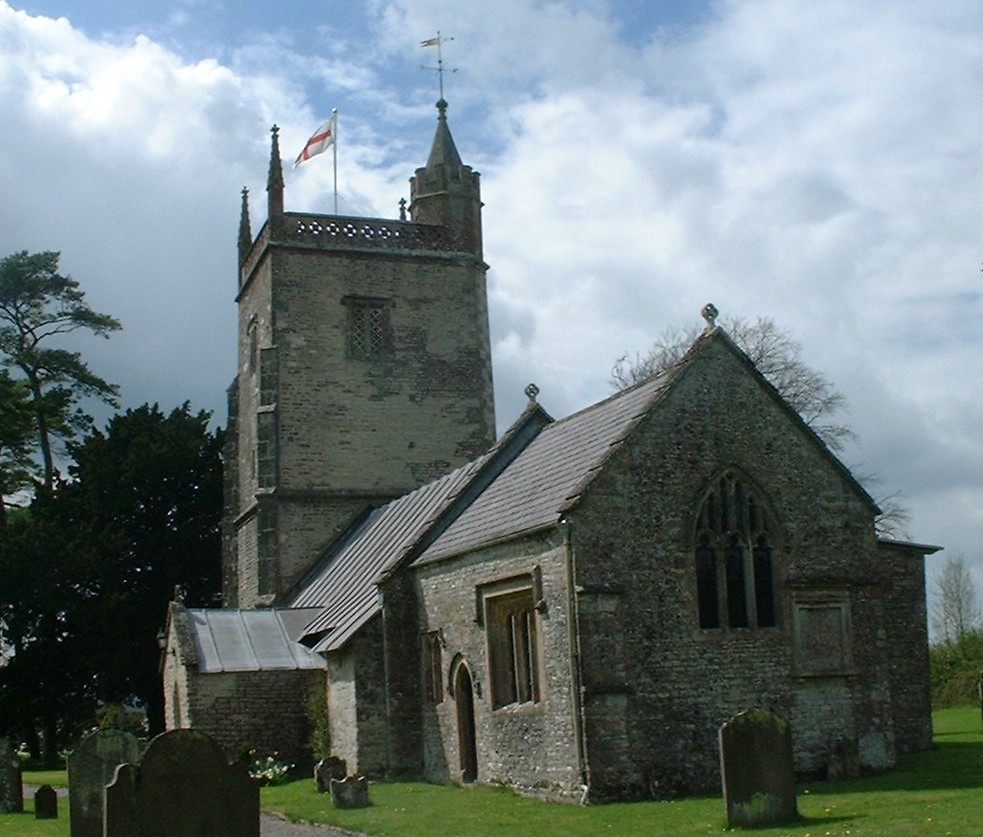

- Location within Somerset
- 51°18′40″N 2°34′59″W
- Location: Hinton Blewett, Somerset, England

History
- Built: 13th century

Listed Building – Grade I
- Official name: Church of St Margaret
- Designated: 15 January 1986
- Reference no.: 1136547

The Church of St Margaret in Hinton Blewett, Somerset, England probably dates from the 13th century although parts are as late as the 16th or 17th century. It has been designated as a Grade I listed building.

The church is largely built of Blue Lias with Doulting Stone arcade. It includes the coat of arms of Simon Seward (Rector 1514–59) over the doorway. The church has space for around 80 people. The electronic organ was dedicated in 1989.

The five bells in the tower were cast in 1708 by the Bilbies of Chew Stoke.

The parish is part of the benefice of East Harptree with West Harptree and Hinton Blewett, Litton with Chewton Mendip within the archdeaconry of Wells.

== See also ==
- Grade I listed buildings in Bath and North East Somerset
- List of Somerset towers
- List of ecclesiastical parishes in the Diocese of Bath and Wells
