= Church of St Laurence, East Harptree =

Church in Somerset, England

Church of St Laurence
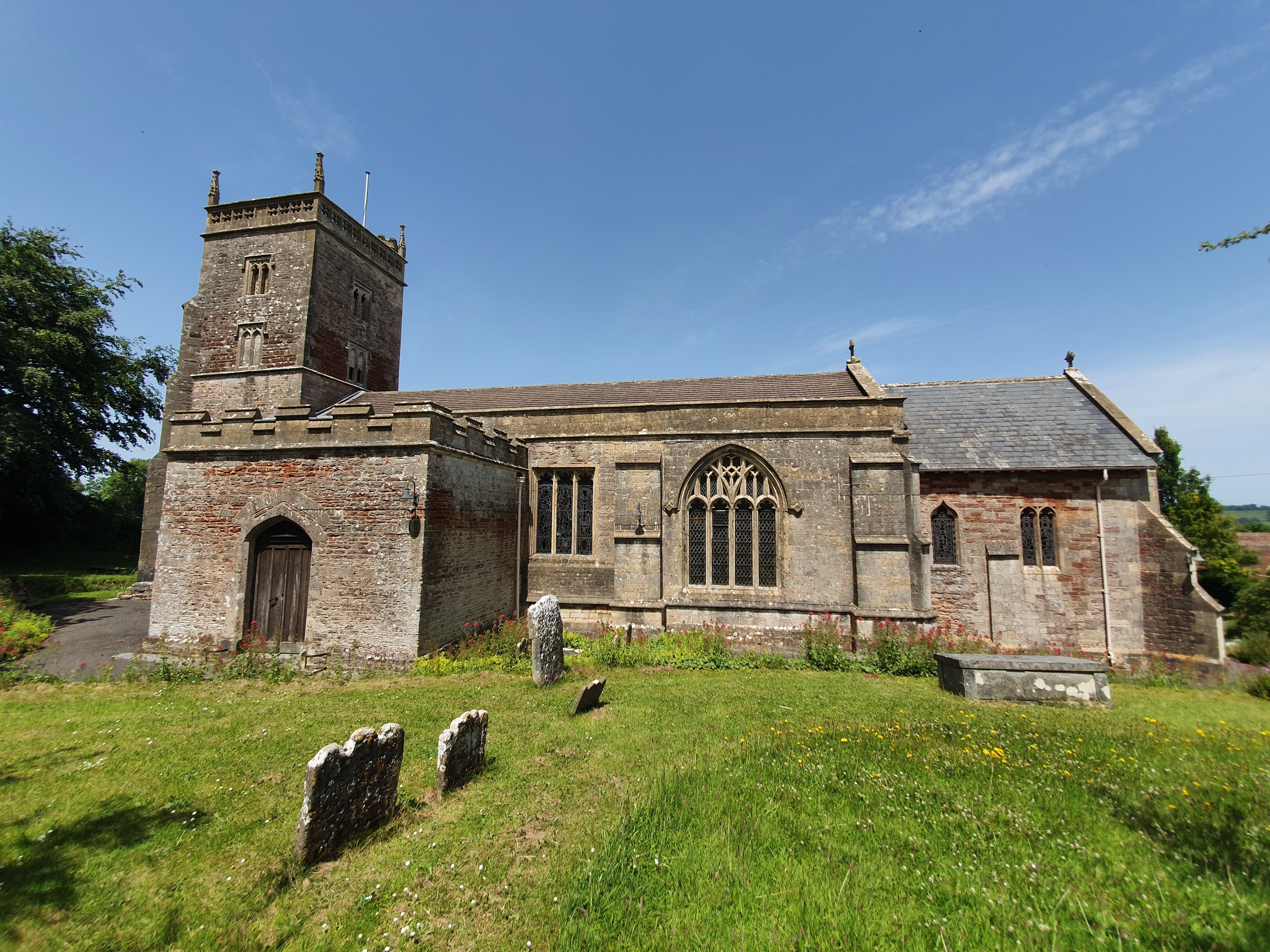

- Location within Somerset
- 51°18′04″N 2°37′29″W
- Location: East Harptree, Somerset England

History
- Built: Late 12th century

Listed Building – Grade II*
- Designated: 21 September 1960
- Reference no.: 1312831

The Church of St Laurence in East Harptree, Somerset, England, was built in the late 12th century. It is a Grade II* listed building.

The original 12th-century church was expanded in the 13th century and the tower added in the 15th. The three-stage west tower, which was built in the 15th century is supported by diagonal buttresses. The parapet was restored in 1633. The tower has a small polygonal turret in the north west corner and a parapet with gargoyles beneath it. It contains six bells.

New seating was provided during repairs in the 1880s.

The parish is now part of the benefice of East Harptree with West Harptree and Hinton Blewett, Litton with Chewton Mendip within the archdeaconry of Wells.

== Interior ==
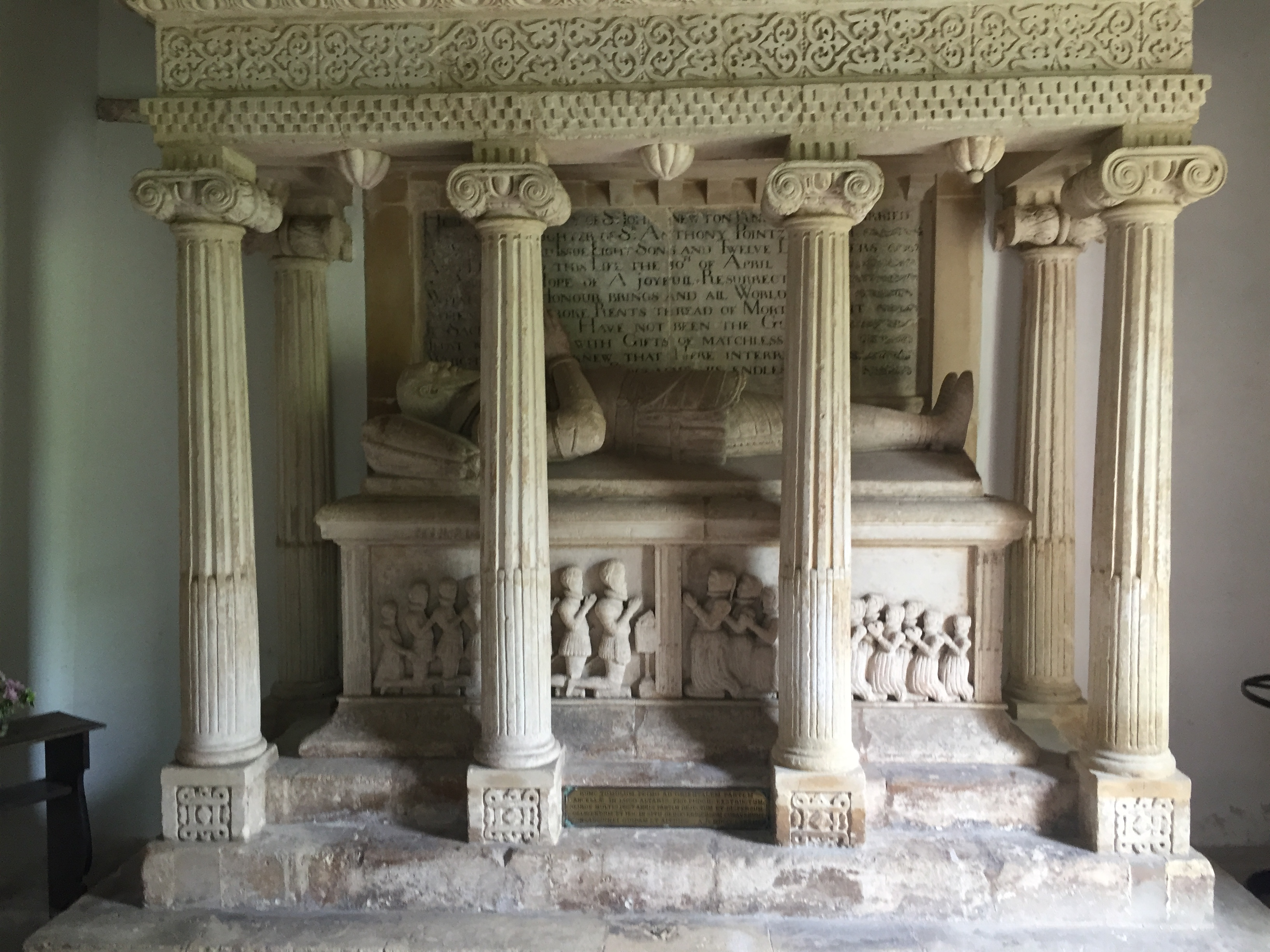
Monument to Sir John Newton (d.1568)

In a recess within the Norman porch of the church is the tomb of Sir John Newton who died in 1568. He is depicted in armour, lying beside his wife, Margaret, daughter of Sir Anthony Poyntz. The two panels in front of the tomb depict his eight sons and twelve daughters kneeling. It is covered by a canopy supported by six fluted Ionic columns. It was previously where the altar stands and was moved to the porch in 1883.

In the nave is a Norman font and a Jacobean pulpit.

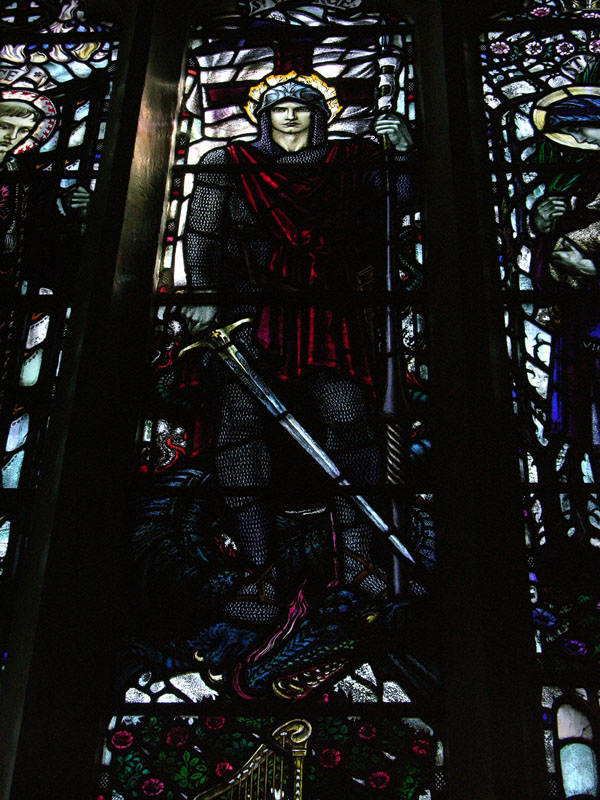
Karl Parsons stained glass window showing the central light with an image of St George

The church includes a stained glass window by Karl Parsons which was installed as a War Memorial in 1919 to the eight men from the village who died in World War I. It is a three-light window with St George in the centre light, St Laurence in that to the left and St Agnes on the right. St Agnes holds a lamb.

The organ, a two manual electrically blown organ, which was made by Vowles of Bristol, was refurbished in 2009.

== See also ==
- List of ecclesiastical parishes in the Diocese of Bath and Wells
