= Michael Mann (judge) =

English judge

The Right Honourable Sir Michael Mann

Lord Justice of Appeal
- In office 1988–1995

Justice of the High Court
- In office 1982–1988

Sir Michael Mann, PC (9 December 1930 – 14 June 1998) was an English judge. He was a Lord Justice of Appeal from 1988 to 1995.

== Biography ==
Born in Streatham, Michael was the son of Adrian Bernard Mann, CBE, a civil engineer, and of Mary Louise Man (née Keen).

Mann was educated at Whitgift School and King's College, London, where he read Law and took a PhD in international law. Called to the Bar by Gray's Inn in 1953, he worked as a part-time legal assistant at the Foreign Office until 1956 and lectured at the London School of Economics until 1964.

He began to practise at the bar in 1955, specialising in planning law. He was Junior Counsel to the Land Commission (Common Law) between 1967 and 1971, and took silk in 1972. He was appointed a recorder in 1979.

Mann was appointed a Justice of the High Court in 1982, and was assigned to the Queen's Bench Division. As a trial judge, he presided over the murder trial of Dean Hancock and Russell Shankland, who were convicted of the killing David Wilkie, a taxi driver, during the miners' strike of 1984–85. He was appointed a Lord Justice of Appeal in 1988, and retired in 1995 owing to ill-health. On the Court of Appeal, he participated in high-profile cases such as R (Factortame Ltd) v Secretary of State for Transport and R v Secretary of State for Foreign and Commonwealth Affairs, ex p Rees-Mogg. In 1991, he was one of the three judges who quashed the convictions of the Maguire Seven.

Mann married Jean Marjorie Bennett MRCVS in 1957; they had two sons. The marriage was dissolved in 1988. He married Audrey Edith Umpleby in 1989.
