= Geoffrey Hippisley-Cox =

Sir Edward Geoffrey Hippisley-Cox by Walter Stoneman.

Colonel Sir Edward Geoffrey Hippisley-Cox CBE TD DL (29 August 1884 – 24 February 1954) was a British Army officer and parliamentary agent.

He was honorary colonel of the Queen's Westminsters. In 1928, he bought Gournay Court in West Harptree, Somerset. He was appointed as a Deputy Lieutenant of the County of London on 11 August 1925. This gave him the post-nominal letters "DL" for life. He was knighted in the 1938 King's Birthday Honours list.
