= Cholwell, Cameley =

Manor in England

Coordinates: 51.3268°N 2.5510°W

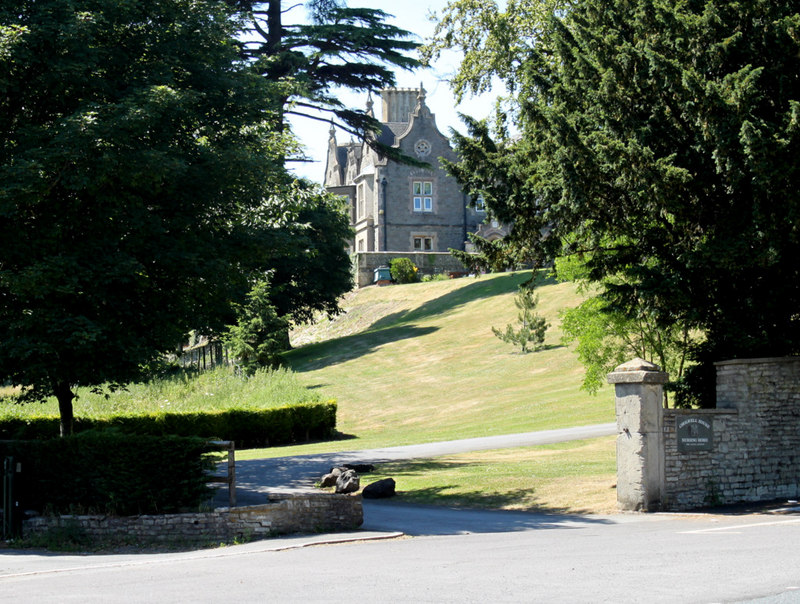
Cholwell House, as rebuilt in 1855 by William Rees-Mogg (1815-1909)

Cholwell is a historic hamlet and manor in the parish of Cameley, Somerset, England. The manor house, Cholwell House, was rebuilt in 1855 by William Rees-Mogg (1815-1909). It is a Grade II listed building.

== History ==
According to Collinson (died 1793), today's Cholwell was the manor of Cilele listed in the Domesday Book of 1086.

=== Mogg ===
Arms of Mogg: Argent, on a fess pean between six ermine spots the two exterior in chief and the centre spot in base surmounted by a crescent gules a cock or

In 1726 the manor of Cholwell was purchased by Richard Mogg (1690-1729) of Chewton Mendip, Somerset, son of John Mogg (d.1728) of the Manor House, Farrington Gurney in Somerset, Sheriff of Somerset in 1703, by his wife Dorothy Hippisley (1610-1673), a daughter of Edward Hippisley of Chewton Mendip. Richard's granddaughter was Mary Mogg (1744-1829), heiress of Cholwell, who in 1772 married William Wooldrige, whose family was from Dudmaston in Shropshire.

=== Wooldrige ===
William Wooldrige married Mary Mogg (1744-1829), daughter and heiress of John Mogg (born 1722) of Cholwell, by whom he left an only child and sole heiress Mary Mogg Wooldrige (1774-1846), heiress of Cholwell, who married Rev. John Rees.

=== Rees-Mogg ===
==== Rev. John Rees-Mogg (1772-1835) ====
Arms of Rees: Gules, a chevron engrailed erminois between three swans argent wings elevated or

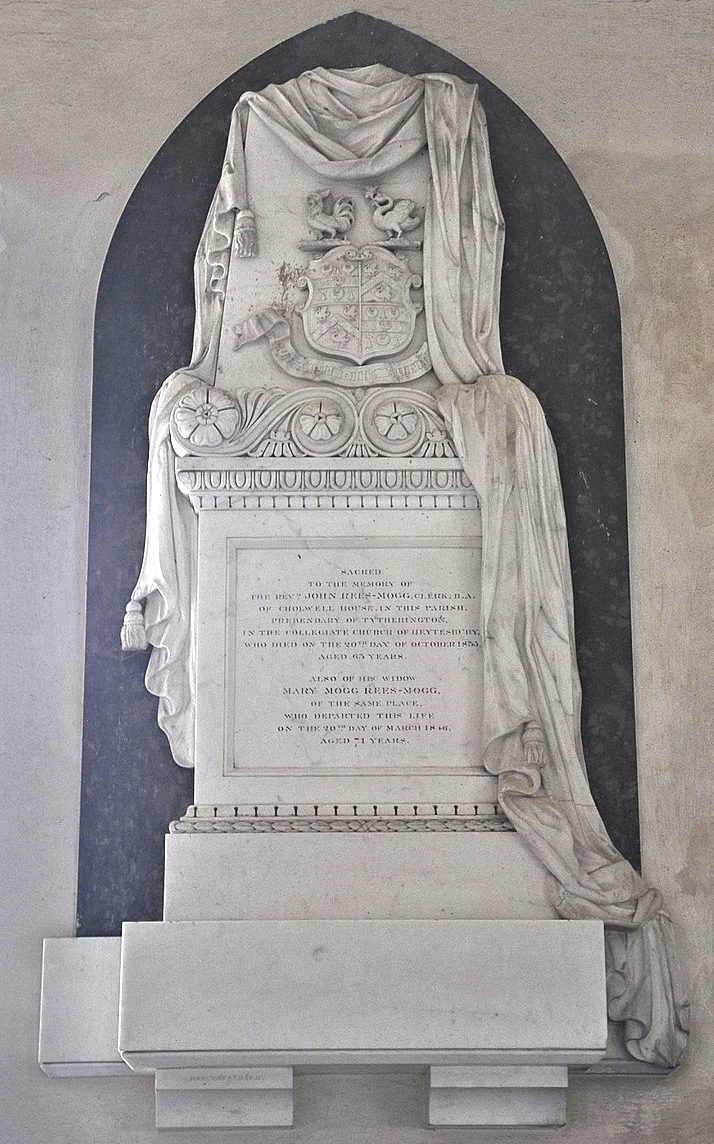
Mural monument to Rev. John Rees-Mogg (1772-1835), St James's church, Cameley

Rev. John Rees (1772-1835) married Mary Mogg Wooldrige (1774-1846), heiress of Cholwell, and in 1805, in accordance with the will of his wife's grandfather John Mogg (born 1722) of Cholwell, he assumed by royal licence the additional surname and arms of Mogg. He was the son of John Rees (1737-1806) of Wick in Glamorgan, Wales, by his wife Catherine Leyson, a daughter of Lewis Leyson of Bryn-y-Fron, Wales. He was Prebendary of Tytherington, an office of the Collegiate Church of Heytesbury, and was Chaplain to HRH Ernest Augustus, Duke of Cumberland (1771-1851). His mural monument survives in St James's Church, Cameley, inscribed as follows:

"Sacred to the memory of the Rev. John Rees-Mogg, Clerk, B.A. of Cholwell House in this parish, Prebendary of Tytherington in the Collegiate Church of Heytesbury, who died on the 20th day of October, 1835, aged 63. Also of his widow, Mary Rees-Mogg, of the same place, who departed this life on the 20th day of March, 1846, aged 71 years"

It shows above the arms of Mogg (Argent, on a fess pean between six ermine spots the two exterior in chief and the centre spot in base surmounted by a crescent gules a cock or) quartering Rees (Gules, a chevron engrailed erminois between three swans argent)

==== William Rees-Mogg (1815-1909) ====
William Rees-Mogg (1815-1909), son, who in 1847 married Ann James, daughter and eventual heiress of William Coxeter James of Timsbury in Somerset, JP, DL. In 1855 he demolished the old manor house at Cholwell, which dated from before the 17th century, and rebuilt the present structure.

==== William Wooldrige Rees-Mogg (1848-1913) ====
William Wooldrige Rees-Mogg (1848-1913) of Cholwell, son, who in 1884 married Emily Savory, 3rd daughter of Rev. Henry Stiles Savory, Rector of Cameley.

==== Edmund Fletcher Rees-Mogg (1889-1962) ====
Edmund Fletcher Rees-Mogg (1889-1962) of Cholwell, son, Sheriff of Somerset in 1945, who in 1920 married Beatrice Warren, a daughter of Daniel Warren of New York, USA. He served in World War I as a lieutenant in the Royal Army Service Corps.

==== William Rees-Mogg, Baron Rees-Mogg (1928-2012) ====
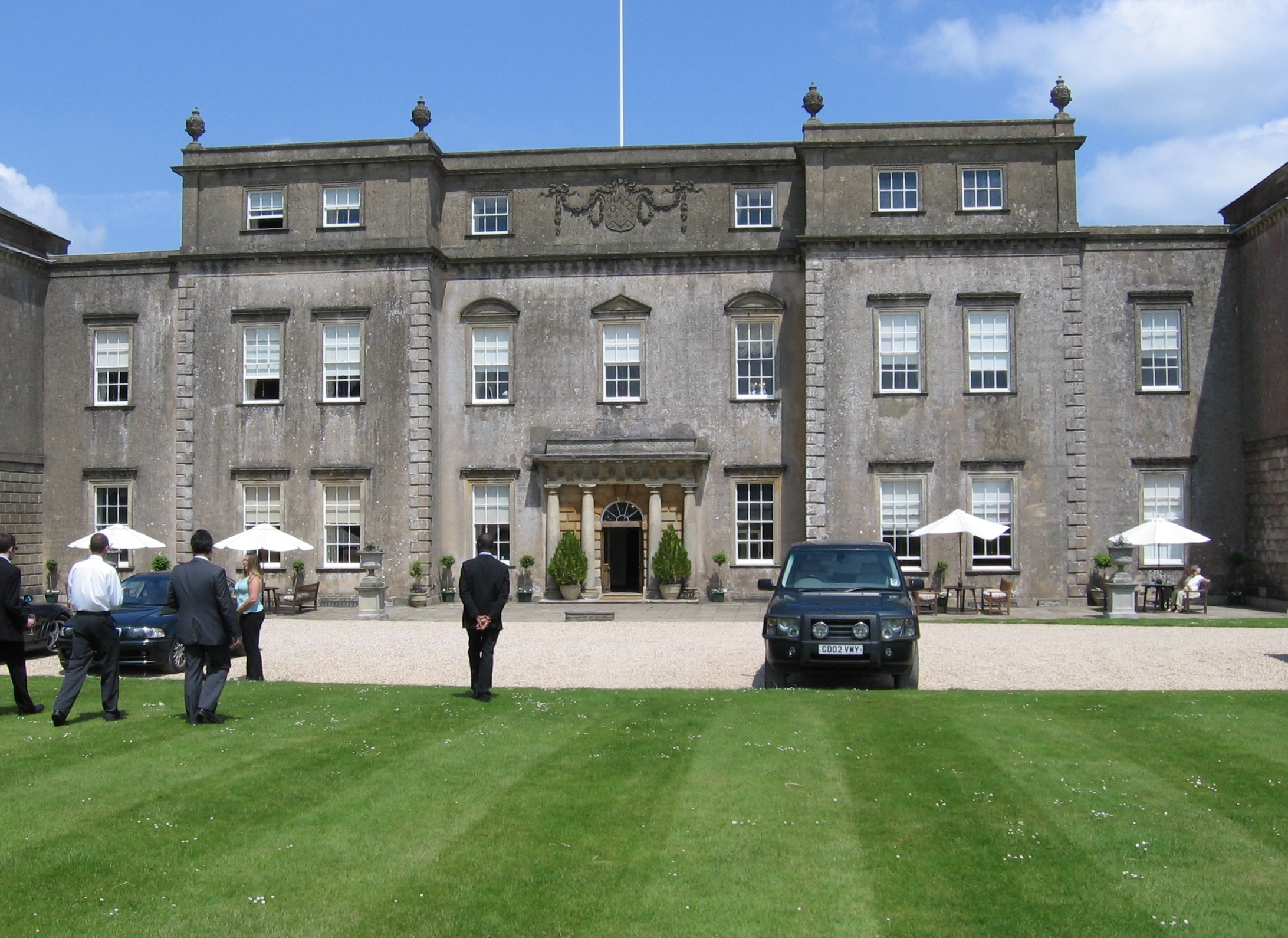
Ston Easton House, purchased by William Rees-Mogg in 1964

William Rees-Mogg, Baron Rees-Mogg (1928-2012), son, of Ston Easton Park and Hinton Blewett in Somerset, editor of The Times (1967–81), chairman of the Arts Council of Great Britain, and vice-chairman of the BBC, created a Life Peer in 1988. In 1964 he purchased the large Georgian mansion house Ston Easton Park near Bath, Somerset, built by John Hippisley-Coxe (died 1769), a relative of his ancestress Dorothy Hippisley, the wife of John Mogg (d.1728) of Farington Gurney, whose son purchased Cholwell in 1726. Ston Easton had been threatened with demolition and Rees-Mogg partially restored it. In 1978 he sold Ston Easton to the Smedley family. He married Gillian Shakespeare Morris, a daughter of Thomas Richard Morris, a lorry driver, car salesman and, later, local Conservative councillor who served for a year as Mayor of St Pancras in London. He had five children with his wife Gillian. His second son is Jacob Rees-Mogg (born 1969), of Gournay Court in the parish of West Harptree in Somerset, a financier and from 2010 until 2024 the Conservative party Member of Parliament for North East Somerset, in which constituency is situated Cholwell House. Jacob's official website states: "Being elected fulfilled his ambition to represent the Somerset parliamentary seat in which his family has lived for generations".
