= Robert Wolfall =

Anglican priest

Robert Wolfall was an Anglican priest who served as chaplain to Martin Frobisher's third expedition to the Arctic. He celebrated the first Anglican (i.e. post-Reformation) Eucharist in what is now Canadian territory in 1578 in Frobisher Bay.

Wolfall was the vicar of the Church of St Mary in the Somerset village of West Harptree. He sailed from Harwich on 31 May 1578 in the fleet of 15 sailing ships of the Frobisher expedition.

In describing the company, chronicler Richard Hakluyt called Wolfall "one Maister Wolfall, a learned man, appointed by her Majestie's Councell to be their Minister and Preacher," who, "being well seated and settled at home in his owne countrey, with a good and large liuing, hauing a good, honest woman to wife, and very towardly children, being of good reputation amongst the best, refused not to take in hand this paineful voyage, for the onely care he had to saue soules and to reforme these infidels, if it were possible, to Christianitie."

Wolfall conducted religious services on the voyage across the Atlantic. The journal of the captain of the ship Judith describes a communion service on that ship on 22 July 1578. The captain of the ship Anne Francis wrote that "Master Wolfall made sermons and celebrated the Communion at sundry ... times in several and sundry ships, because the whole company could never meet together at any one place."

He presided over the first communion service in what is now Canadian territory on 3 or 4 September 1578, at Frobisher Bay on Baffin Island. Hakluyt's description of the occasion states:

Maister Wolfall on Winter's Fornace, preached a godly sermon, which being ended, he celebrated also a Communion vpon the land, at the partaking whereof was the Captain of the Anne Francis, and many other Gentlemen, and Souldiers, Mariners, and Miners with him. The celebration of the diuine mystery was the first signe, seale, and confirmation of Christ's name, death, and passion euer knowen in these quarters.
