= Church of St Mary, West Harptree =

Church in Somerset, England

Church of St Mary
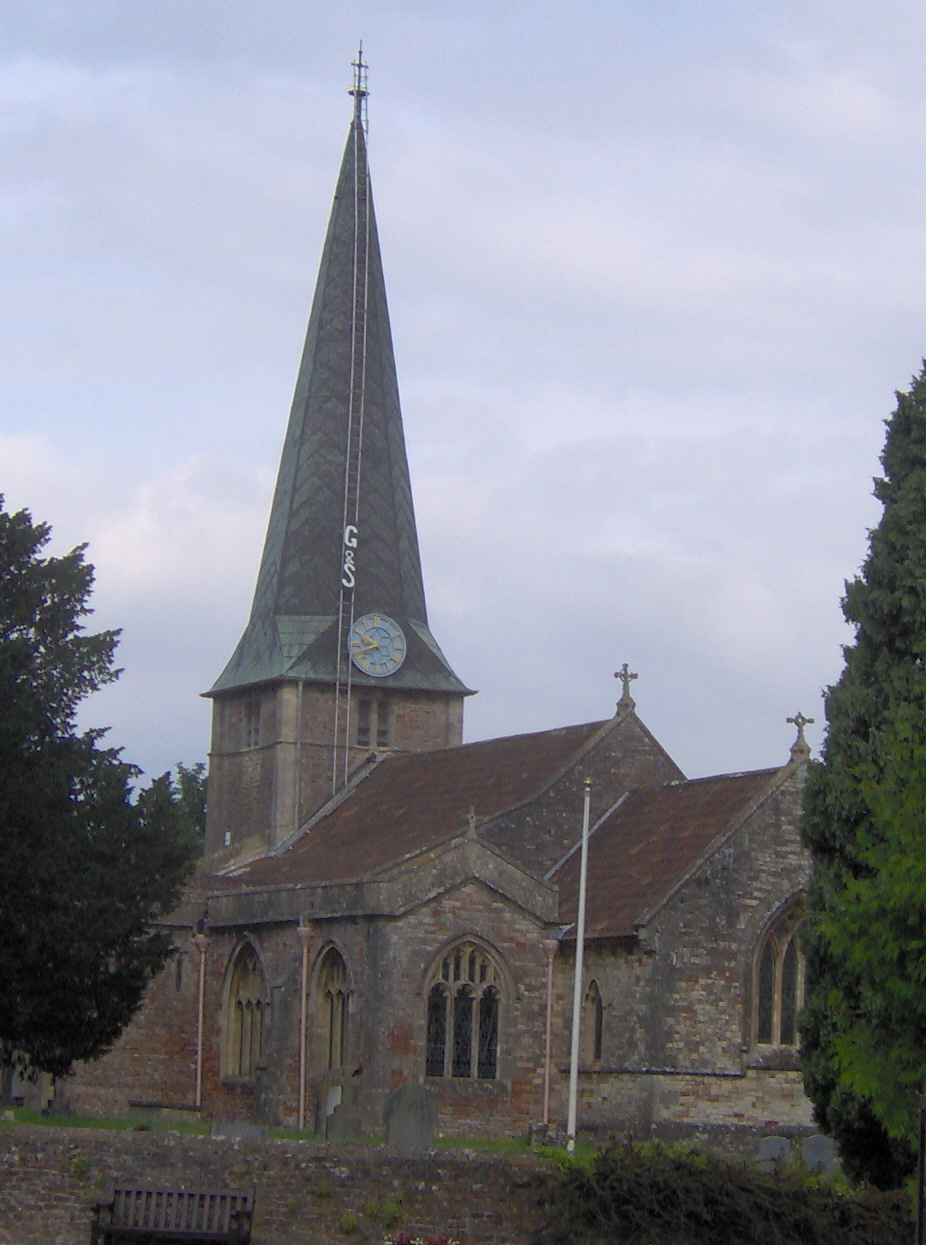

- Location within Somerset
- 51°18′34″N 2°37′56″W
- Location: West Harptree, Somerset, England

History
- Built: 12th century

Listed Building – Grade II*
- Designated: 21 September 1960
- Reference no.: 1312706

The Church of St Mary in West Harptree within the English county of Somerset was built in the 12th century, with the spire being added in the 13th century. It is a Grade II* listed building.

The parish is part of the benefice of East Harptree with West Harptree and Hinton Blewett, Litton with Chewton Mendip within the archdeaconry of Wells.

== History ==
The west tower was built in the 12th century, with a spire being added in the 13th century. The main body of the church dates from the 15th century. The church was restored in 1865 by Charles Edmund Giles.

The original foundation, created around 1135, may have been by William FitzJohn de Harptree. He was involved in the construction of Richmont Castle in East Harptree, which would have overlooked West Harptree.

== Architecture ==
The church is largely built of dolomitic conglomerate. The buttresses also contain some red sandstone. It has a nave, aisle and east chancel. The nave and aisle are separated by three arches supported by octagonal columns, while the chancel is again separated from the nave by a further three arches. There is a transept to the north and porch with the main door opening from the southerly aisle.

The octagonal spire is approximately 11 metres (36 ft) high, on top of a single-stage west tower, which is 15 metres (49 ft) high. It was originally covered with slates, but this had been replaced with lead plates by the 1950s. These in turn were replaced with copper sheets in 1966. The clock was added to the tower in 1947 as a memorial to the men of the village who died in the Second World War.

== Interior ==
The church contains an organ that was built in 1891 by William Sweetland of Bath. The organ was paid for by Revd George Pridham. It was repaired in the 1930s, and more recently.

There are various memorials in the church to villagers, particularly those who made donations to the upkeep of the church. One plaque records the role of the vicar Robert Wolfall, who served as chaplain to Martin Frobisher on his third expedition to the New World. Wolfall was, in 1578, the first Anglican to celebrate Holy Communion in North America.

== See also ==
- List of ecclesiastical parishes in the Diocese of Bath and Wells
