= The Sovereign Individual =

Book by William Rees-Mogg and James Dale Davidson

- First hardcover edition cover
- Author: William Rees-Mogg and James Dale Davidson
- Audio read by: Michael David Axtell
- Cover artist: Calvin Chu (first Touchstone edition)
- Language: English
- Subjects: Forecasting on: The twenty-first century; The rise of the internet; The Y2K problem; Economics; World politics; Cyberspace; Digital economy; Self-ownership; Libertarianism; Decentralization
- Publisher: Touchstone (Simon & Schuster)
- Publication date: 1997 (originally) (Note: The copyright page of the book states that it was first copyrighted in 1997, with the Touchstone edition copyrighting it on 26 August 1999, and in 2020 (as per their website).); 26 August 1999 (Touchstone edition)
- Media type: Print (hardcover and paperback), e-book, audiobook
- Pages: 448
- ISBN: 9780684832722
- OCLC: 925008652
- Preceded by: The Great Reckoning: How the World Will Change Before the Year 2000

The Sovereign Individual: How to Survive and Thrive During the Collapse of the Welfare State is a 1997 non-fiction book by William Rees-Mogg and James Dale Davidson, later republished on 26 August 1999 by Touchstone with the new subtitle Mastering the Transition to the Information Age. It forecasts the development of the twenty-first century; focusing on the rise of the internet and cyberspace, digital currency and digital economy, self-ownership and decentralization from the State.

The Sovereign Individual has been recommended by members of the cryptocurrency community such as Naval Ravikant and Brian Armstrong. In 2020, the book was reprinted with a preface written by PayPal co-founder Peter Thiel.

== Chapters ==
The book contains eleven chapters and has 446 pages (400 pages of plain text, 46 pages of references, notes, and an appendix. The latest edition of the book with Thiel's foreword adds two more pages).

The chapters are:

1. The Transition of the Year 2000: The Fourth Stage of Human Society
2. Megapolitical Transformations in Historic Perspective
3. East of Eden: The Agricultural Revolution and the Sophistication of Violence
4. The Last Days of Politics: Parallels Between the Senile Decline of the Holy Mother Church and the Nanny State
5. The Life and Death of the Nation-State: Democracy and Nationalism as Resource Strategies in the Age of Violence
6. The Megapolitics of the Information Age: The Triumph of Efficiency over Power
7. Transcending Locality: The Emergence of the Cybereconomy
8. The End of Egalitarian Economics: The Revolution in Earnings Capacity in a World Without Jobs
9. Nationalism, Reaction, and the New Luddites
10. The Twilight of Democracy
11. Morality and Crime in the "Natural Economy" of the Information Age

== Content ==
Rees-Mogg and Davidson's main thesis centres around self-ownership and the individual's independence from the State, forecasting the end of the nations and nation-states. In a chapter titled Nationalism, Reaction, and the New Luddites, they criticize nationalism and appeal more to giving the individual control over his destiny rather than the collectiveness given by nationalism. Rees-Mogg and Davidson also refer to a transition to the year 2000, being a birth of a new stage of Western civilization in the coming of the new millennium.

Cover to the 2020 printing of the book (cover by Calvin Chu)

With the rise of the information society, they argue, the individual would be freed from the oppression of government and the drags of prejudice:

Genius will be unleashed, freed from both the oppression of government and the drags of racial and ethnic prejudice. In the Information Society, no one who is truly able will be detained by the ill-formed opinions of others. It will not matter what most of the people on earth might think of your race, your looks, your age, your sexual proclivities, or the way you wear your hair. In the cybereconomy, they will never see you. The ugly, the fat, the old, the disabled will vie with the young and beautiful on equal terms in utterly color-blind anonymity on the new frontiers of cyberspace.

Rees-Mogg and Davidson also suggested that digital currency/cybermoney would supersede fiat currency:

New technologies will allow the holders of wealth to bypass the national monopolies that have issued and regulated money in the modern period. [...] Their importance for controlling the world's wealth will be transcended by mathematical algorithms that have no physical existence. In the new millennium, cybermoney controlled by private markets will supersede fiat money issued by governments. Only the poor will be victims of inflation and ensuing collapses into deflation that are consequences of the artificial leverage which fiat money injects into the economy.

Rees-Mogg and Davidson's recall of "mathematical algorithms that have no physical existence" is similar to the functional mechanism of certain cryptocurrencies such as Bitcoin and other proof-of-work currencies.

Rees-Mogg and Davidson have also predicted that with the rise of this new cyberspace, and consequently cybermoney, it will become harder for a nation-state to collect taxes from its citizens. They compare the State to a farmer keeping cows in a field to be milked but that "soon, the cows will have wings". They predict that for the government to collect taxes from its citizens in this type of society, it would have to violate human rights, even traditionally civil countries would have to resort and "turn nasty":

Lacking their accustomed scope to tax and inflate, governments, even in traditionally civil countries, will turn nasty. As income tax becomes uncollectable, older and more arbitrary methods of exaction will resurface. The ultimate form of withholding tax—de facto or even overt hostage-taking— will be introduced by governments desperate to prevent wealth from escaping beyond their reach. Unlucky individuals will find themselves singled out and held to ransom in an almost medieval fashion. Businesses that offer services that facilitate the realization of autonomy by individuals will be subject to infiltration, sabotage, and disruption. Arbitrary forfeiture of property, already commonplace in the United States, where it occurs five thousand times a week, will become even more pervasive. Governments will violate human rights, censor the free flow of information, sabotage useful technologies, and worse.

== Reception ==
Peter Thiel, who wrote the preface to the 2020 printing, wrote that, among the many things that Rees-Mogg and Davidson got wrong, the biggest part was "perhaps their misjudgment in the rise of China and the prosperity of Hong Kong as an ideal type of government [under colonial rule]".

In his 2018 book, The Bitcoin Standard, Saifedean Ammous mentions and calls The Sovereign Individual's prediction of digital currency "remarkable". Ammous also gives insight on The Sovereign Individual during the section titled Individual Sovereignty, while also commending Davidson and Rees-Mogg's prediction of a digital currency as "remarkable".

E. Glen Weyl and Jaron Lanier criticized in 2022 its predictions about Fujimori's self-coup, cocaine traffic in the United States, bankrupt Canada, right-wing coups, cryptocurrencies and income redistribution. They point the processes predicted by the book are not unavoidable and point to Thiel, Sebastian Kurz and Jacob Rees-Mogg helping accelerate the power of the state to provoke a reaction enabling its collapse.

== See also ==
- Self-ownership
- Cyberspace
- Cryptocurrency
