= Smitham Chimney, East Harptree =

Chimney in Priddy, Somerset, England

Coordinates: 51.2879°N 2.6395°W

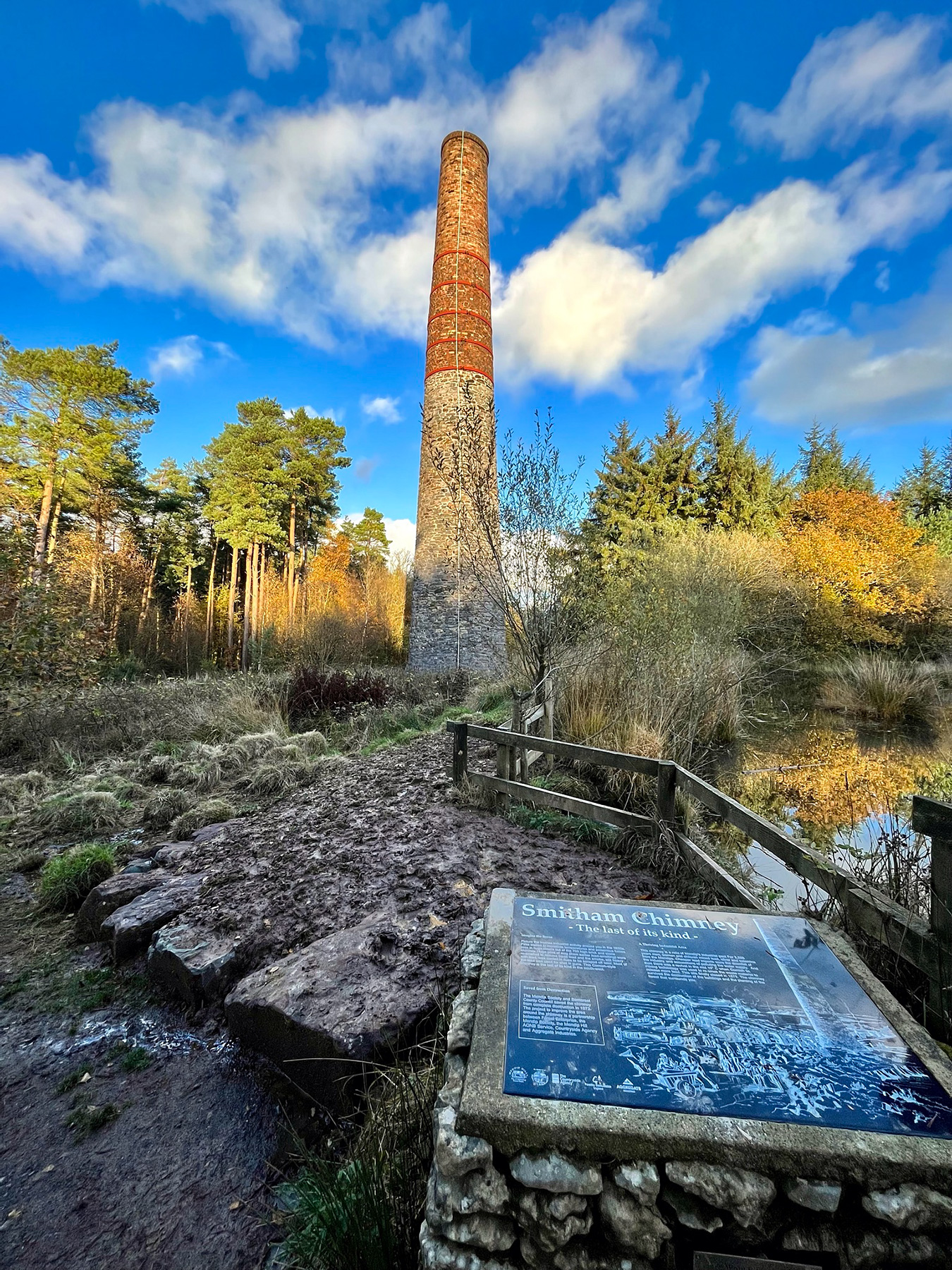
The Chimney showing its information board

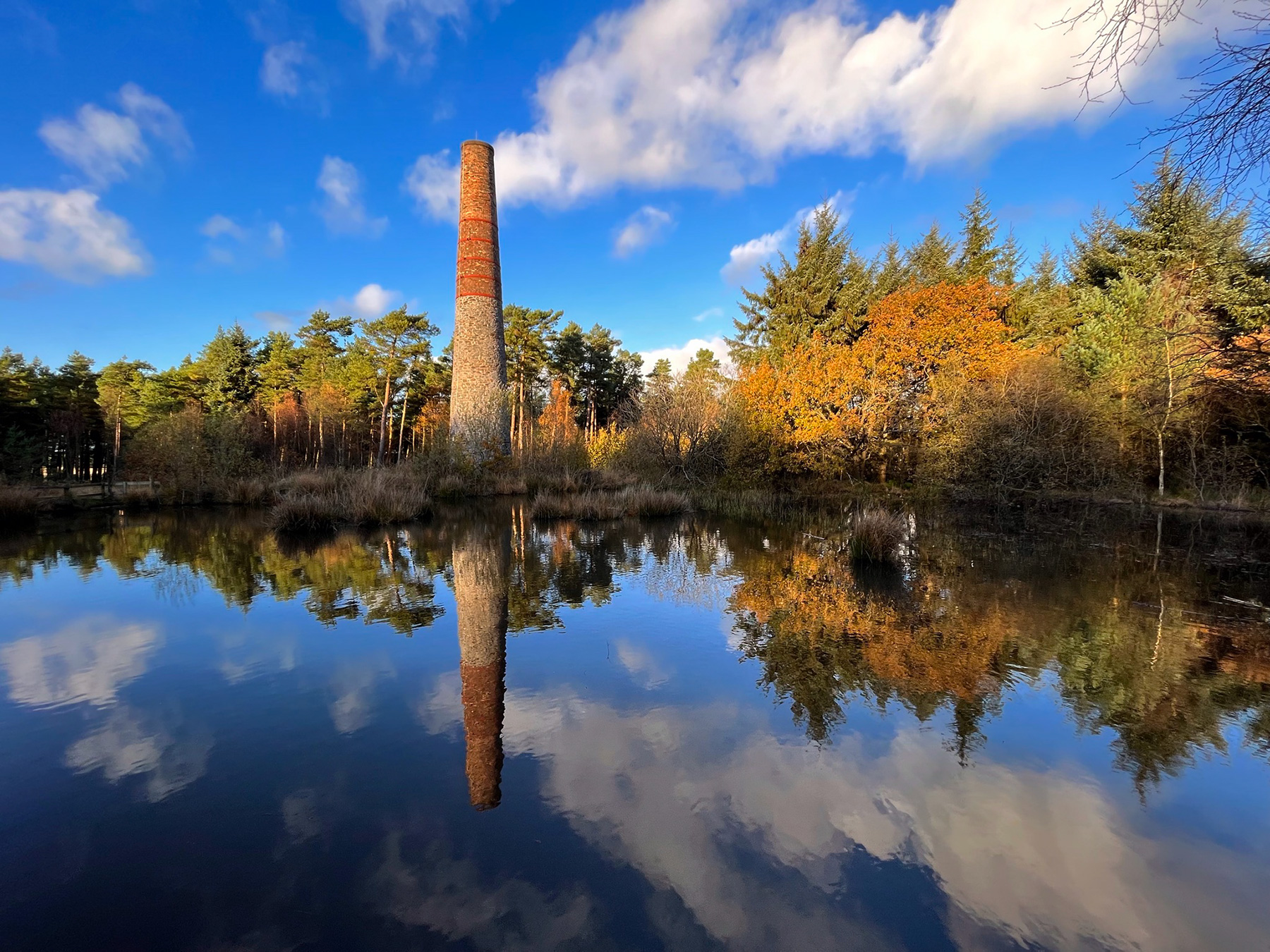
Autumn colours around the Chimney and pond

Smitham Chimney is a chimney which was used for lead mining just outside the village of East Harptree, in the parish of Priddy, Somerset, England. It is a Grade II listed building.

The circular chimney has two types of red brick in its upper portion. There is a narrow opening at the base of the chimney.

It was built by the 'East Harptree Lead Works Co Ltd' in 1867, and by 1870 was producing 1,000 tons per annum. The company was largely unsuccessful and the industry only lasted for a few years. The chimney was threatened to be demolished in 1973, by the Somerset County Council but was protected from demolition. Because of the pollution the site supports a population of lead moss (Ditrichum plumbicola).
