= Wurt Pit and Devil's Punchbowl =

Geological Site of Special Scientific Interest in Somerset, England

- Site of Special Scientific Interest
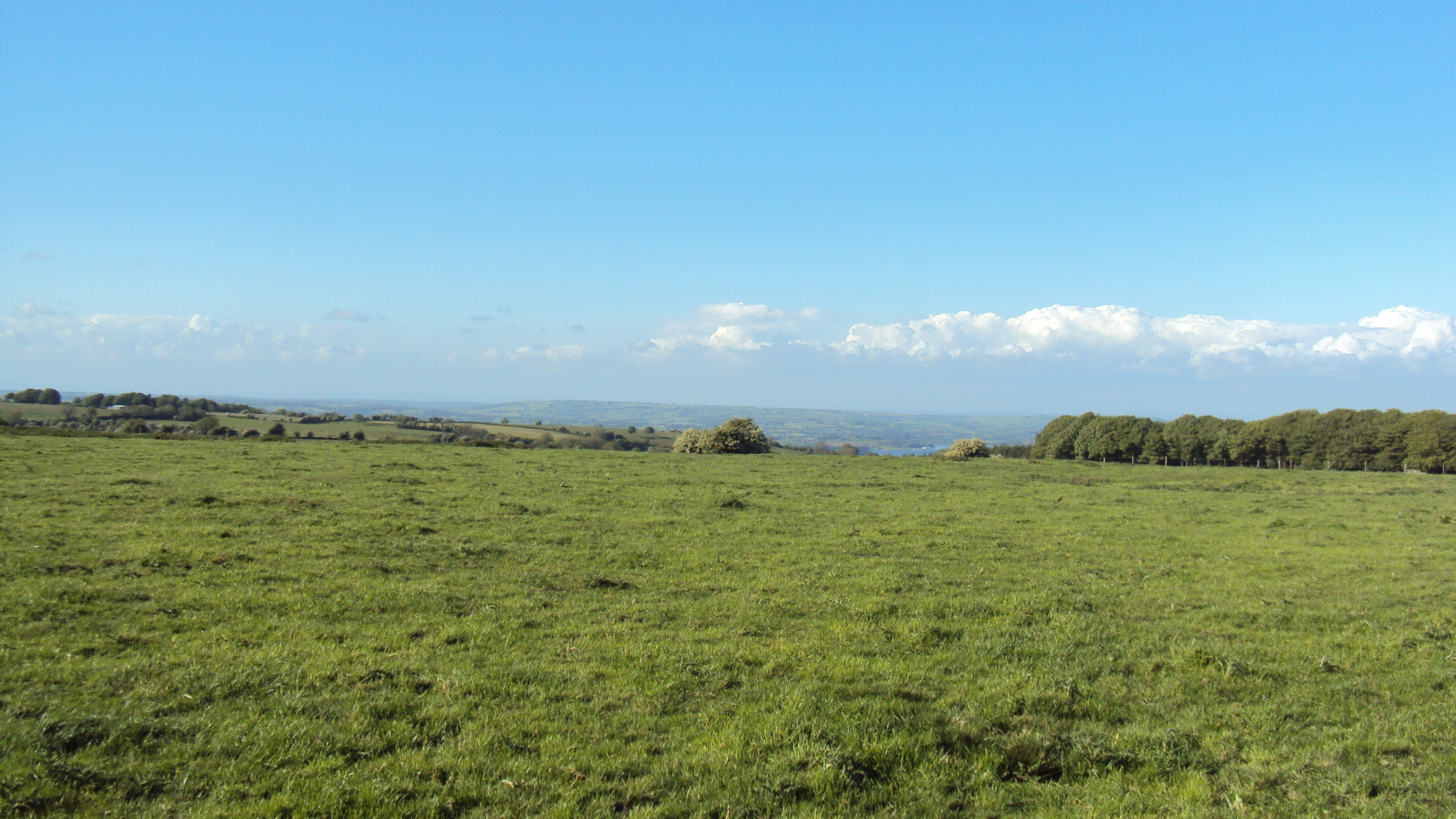

- Location within Somerset
- Location of Wurt Pit and Devil's Punchbowl.
- Area of search: Somerset
- Grid reference: ST543537
- Coordinates: 51.2806°N 2.6566°W
- Interest: Geological
- Area: 0.2 hectares (0.0020 km^{2}; 0.00077 sq mi)
- Notification date: 1987

Wurt Pit and Devil's Punchbowl (grid reference ST543537) is a 0.2 hectare (0.5 acre) geological Site of Special Scientific Interest between East Harptree and the Priddy Circles in the Mendip Hills, Somerset, notified in 1987.

Natural England describes the site as:

"This site consists of the two largest subsidence depressions in the Mendips, formed by the underlying limestones having been dissolved by subterranean waters causing the surface rocks to collapse into the void. Clear evidence of their being collapsed structures rather than erosional or solutional features, is gained from the fact that the surface rocks at both localities are insoluble, being marls at Devil's Punchbowl and a series of limestones and clays which have been impregnated by silica at Wurt Pit." "The silica-enrichment of the limestones and clays at Wurt Pit (known as the 'Harptree Beds', of early Jurassic age) is also of considerable mineralogical importance since it took place as part of the main phase of mineralisation which emplaced the principal Mendip orefields during Jurassic times. The Harptree Beds show varying degrees of silica-enrichment, and also contain traces of other minerals, such as limonite and yellow ochre (hydrous ferric oxides), barite (barium sulphate), sphalerite (zinc sulphide) and galena (lead sulphide)."

Wade and Wade, in their 1929 book Somerset, described the Devil's Punch Bowl as one of the most notable Swallet Holes on the Mendips
