= Church of St James, Cameley =

Church in Somerset, England

Church of St James
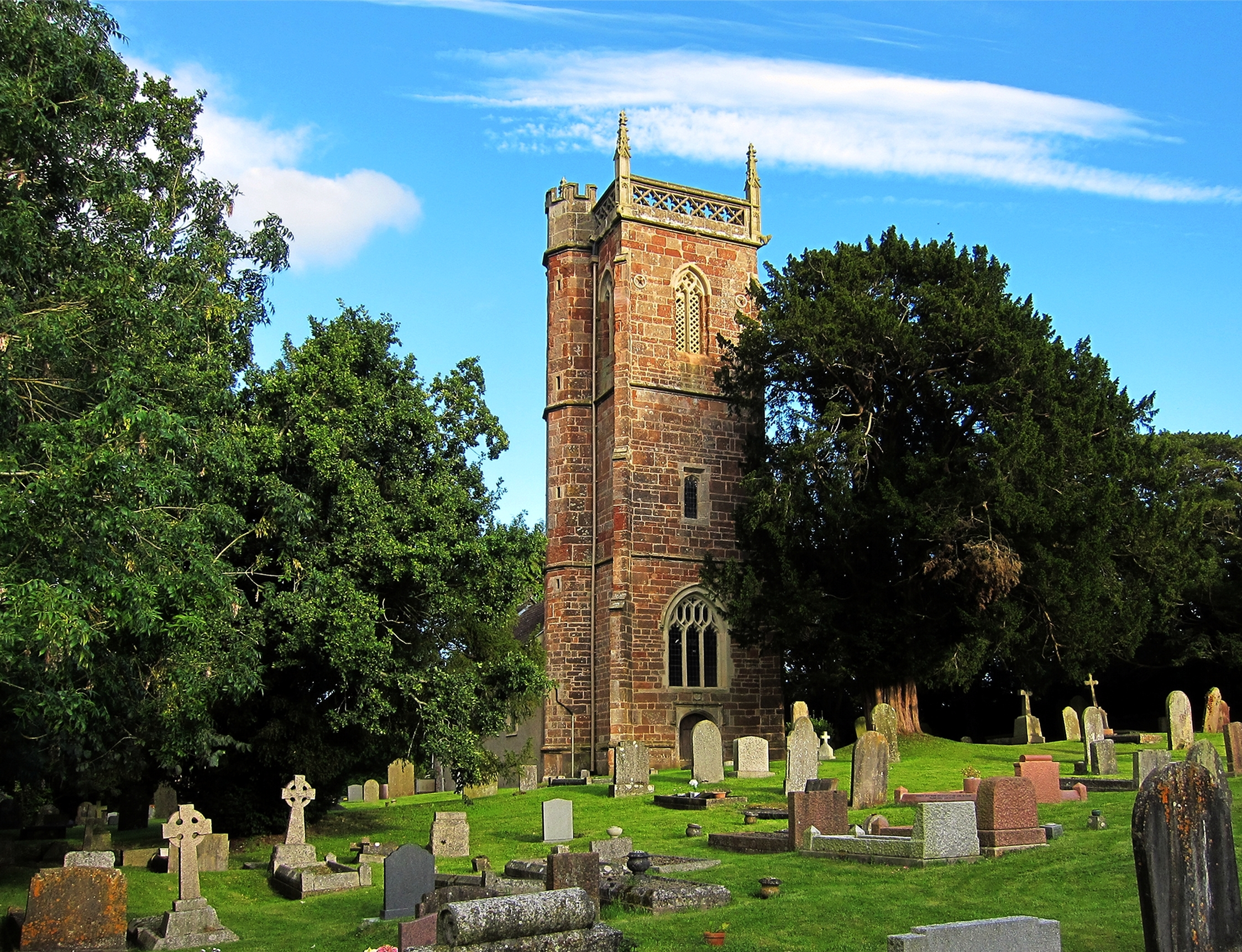

- Location within Somerset
- 51°18′57″N 2°33′37″W
- Location: Cameley, Somerset, England

History
- Built: 12th century

Listed Building – Grade I
- Designated: 21 September 1960
- Reference no.: 1320783

The Church of St James is a redundant church in Cameley, Somerset, England, dating from the late 12th century. It is recorded in the National Heritage List for England as a designated Grade I listed building, and is in the care of the Churches Conservation Trust. It is dedicated to St. James of Compostela. The church was declared redundant on 1 January 1980, and was vested in the Trust on 18 March 1981.

There are fragments of wall paintings on the nave north and south walls dating from the 12th to the 17th centuries. One of the earliest is a jester or knave on the north wall who has a hare-lip and forked tongue and is holding a scroll. The north post of the chancel arch has a depiction of the three lions of the Royal Arms of England, which suggests royal patronage. On the south post is a coat of arms with two red chevrons, which is believed to be of the St Maur family (which later became the Seymour family). Almeric de St Maur was master of the Knights Templar in England and a signatory on Magna Carta. This arms represents evidence of the link between Cameley and Temple Cloud to the Knights Templar.

The fine early-17th-century representation of the Ten Commandments over the chancel arch is framed in twining leaves with cherubs' faces peering out. These remained hidden behind whitewash until the 1960s leading John Betjeman to describe it as "Rip Van Winkle's Church".

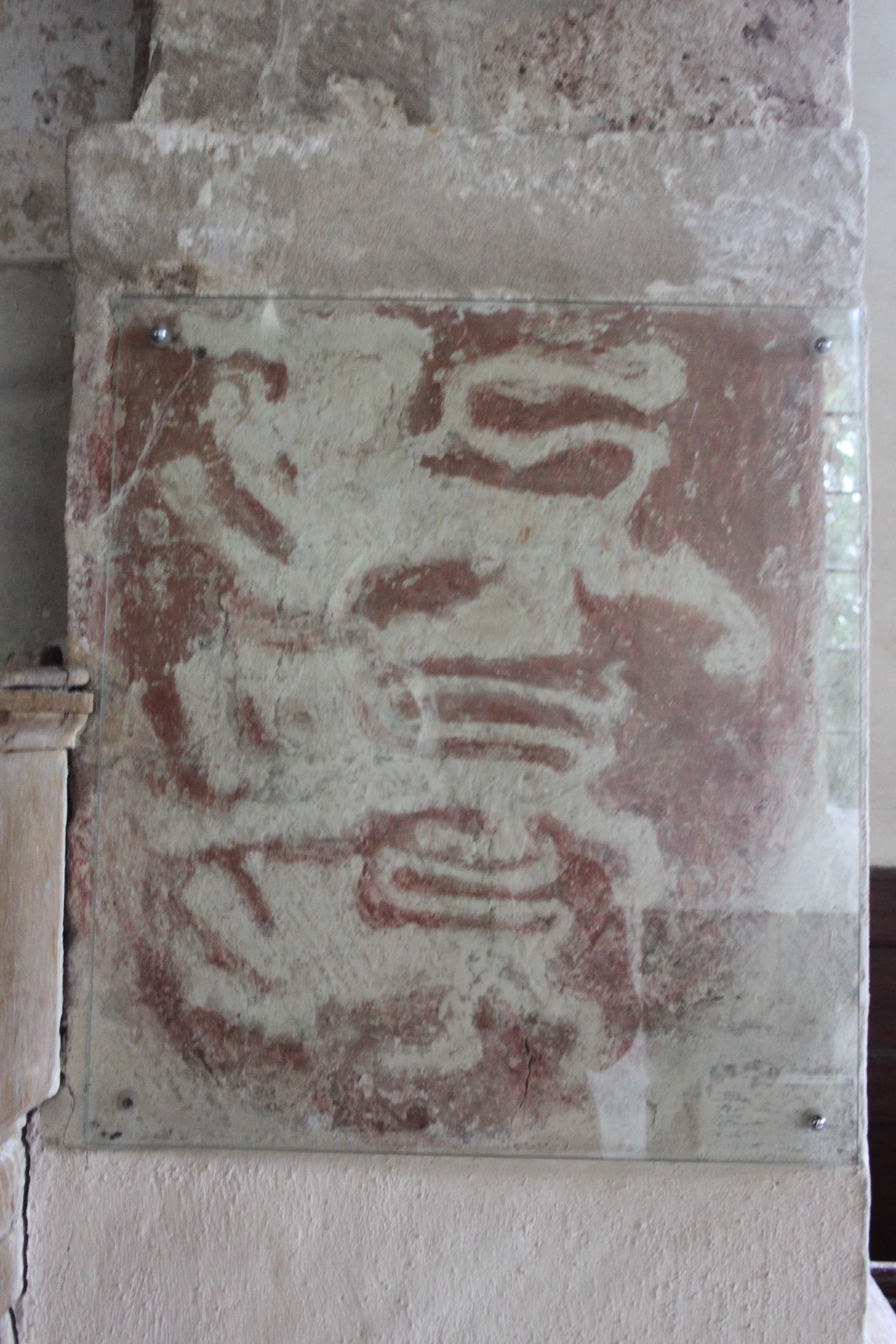
Fragment of wall painting showing the three lions of the Royal Arms of England

The west gallery is dated 1711 but with Jacobean style balusters and attached Charles I coat of arms. The south gallery is dated 1819. There are two early-19th-century monuments to the Rees-Mogg family on the north wall of the nave, and a brass plaque commemorating the nine people from the village who died in World War I. The church is surrounded by trees.

The tower, probably from the 15th century with 19th-century restoration, is built of red Mendip stone which contrasts with the local blue lias limestone of the rest of the church. The tower contains a bell dating from 1779 and made by William Bilbie of the Bilbie family.

Several of the monuments in the churchyard are Grade II listed.

The parish is part of the benefice of Farmborough with Marksbury and Stanton Prior, Clutton with Cameley, and within the archdeaconry of Bath.

== See also ==
- List of Grade I listed buildings in Bath and North East Somerset
- List of towers in Somerset
- List of churches preserved by the Churches Conservation Trust in South West England
- List of ecclesiastical parishes in the Diocese of Bath and Wells
