= James Dale Davidson =

American writer

- Born: April 16, 1946 (age 80); Washington, D.C., U.S.
- Education: University of Maryland
- Notable work: The Great Reckoning, Sovereign Individual

James Dale Davidson (born April 16, 1946) is an American private investor and investment writer, co-writer of the newsletter Strategic Investment, and co-author with William Rees-Mogg of Blood in the Streets: Investment Profits in a World Gone Mad (1987), The Great Reckoning (1991), and The Sovereign Individual (1997). He wrote The Plague of the Black Debt - How to Survive the Coming Depression in 1993 in which he incorrectly predicted that as part of a "deep depression...Clinton is going to be a one-term president...I am as sure of this as I am that the sun will rise tomorrow" and that the US national debt would increase by a trillion dollars during Clinton's "one-term" presidency. He further wrote in the book that Boris Yeltsin, President of the Russian Federation, would lose his job and that Russia will come under the control of a nationalist, militarist regime. He has been credited with predicting the U.S. subprime mortgage crisis, though much earlier than it actually occurred.

Davidson was the founder and former head of the National Taxpayers Union. On his website, Davidson claims to be a "famous economist", despite the fact that he has not received any university degree in economics or published in any peer-reviewed journal.

In his books and his monthly newsletter, Strategic Investment, Davidson has promoted conspiracy theories claimed to link the Clinton administration to the death of Deputy White House Counsel Vince Foster. Foster's death was deemed a suicide by five official or governmental investigations.

Davidson is an original investor and board member of the conservative news site Newsmax Media. In February 2010, he posted a video on the website AftershockProfits.com claiming that "supposed improvements" in the US economy during the Clinton administration were "faked by the government" and a "hoax."

== See also ==
- Furtive fallacy
