= William Rees-Mogg =

British journalist (1928–2012)

The Right Honourable The Lord Rees-Mogg Kt

Chairman of the Arts Council of Great Britain
- In office 1982–1989
- Preceded by: Sir Kenneth Robinson
- Succeeded by: Peter Palumbo

Member of the House of Lords
- Lord Temporal
- Life peerage 8 August 1988 – 29 December 2012

Personal details
- Born: William Rees-Mogg; 14 July 1928 Bristol, England
- Died: 29 December 2012 (aged 84) London, England
- Resting place: Church of St James, Cameley
- Party: None (crossbencher)
- Other political affiliations: Conservative
- Spouse: Gillian Morris
- Children: 5, including Jacob and Annunziata
- Education: Balliol College, Oxford
- Profession: Newspaper journalism
- Awards: Knight Bachelor (1981)

William Rees-Mogg, Baron Rees-Mogg (14 July 1928 – 29 December 2012) was a British newspaper journalist who was Editor of The Times from 1967 to 1981. In the late 1970s, he served as High Sheriff of Somerset, and in the 1980s was Chairman of the Arts Council of Great Britain and Vice-Chairman of the BBC's Board of Governors. He is the father of the politicians Jacob and Annunziata Rees-Mogg.

== Early life ==
William Rees-Mogg was born in 1928 in Bristol, England. He was the son of Edmund Fletcher Rees-Mogg (1889–1962) of Cholwell House in the parish of Cameley in Somerset, an Anglican, and his Irish American Catholic wife, Beatrice Warren, a daughter of Daniel Warren of New York. William Rees-Mogg was raised in the Roman Catholic faith.

He was educated at Clifton College Preparatory School in Bristol and Charterhouse in Godalming, where he was Head of School.

Not yet eighteen, Rees-Mogg went up to Balliol College, Oxford, as a Brackenbury Scholar to read history in January 1946 as a place had fallen temporarily vacant. By the end of the Trinity (summer) term, he had been elected to the library committee (the junior committee) of the Oxford Union Society and was due to be an officer of the Oxford University Conservative Association under Margaret Roberts (the future Prime Minister Margaret Thatcher), President for Michaelmas (autumn) Term 1946.

However, having spent two terms at Oxford he did not return in October. He later wrote that he had been forced to give up his place to a disabled ex-serviceman. From 1946 to 1948, beginning with an exceptionally bitter winter, he did his National Service in the Royal Air Force education department rising to the rank of sergeant. His duties included teaching illiterate recruits to read and write, and his reference from his commanding officer stated that he was competent to perform simple tasks under supervision.

He returned to Oxford to complete his degree, and became President of Oxford University Conservative Association in Michaelmas Term 1950 and President of the Oxford Union in Trinity term, 1951. He graduated that term with a second-class degree.

== Career ==
Rees-Mogg began his career in journalism in London at the Financial Times in 1952, becoming chief leader writer in 1955 and, in addition, assistant editor in 1957. During this period he was Conservative candidate for the safe Labour seat of Chester-le-Street in a by-election on 27 September 1956, losing to the Labour candidate Norman Pentland by 21,287 votes, as he did in the subsequent general election by a similar margin.

Rees-Mogg moved to The Sunday Times in 1960, later becoming its Deputy Editor from 1964 where he wrote "A Captain's Innings", which many believe convinced Alec Douglas-Home to resign as Tory leader, making way for Edward Heath, in July 1965.

Rees-Mogg was editor of The Times from 1967 to 1981. In a 1967 editorial entitled "Who breaks a butterfly on a wheel?", (Note: a reference to the line Who breaks a butterfly on a wheel? by Alexander Pope) he criticised the severity of the custodial sentence for Mick Jagger on a drugs offence. With colleagues, he attempted a buyout of Times Group Newspapers in 1981 to stop its sale by the Thomson Organisation to Rupert Murdoch, but was unsuccessful. Murdoch replaced him as editor with Harold Evans. Rees-Mogg wrote a comment column for The Independent from its foundation in the autumn of 1986 until near the end of 1992, when he rejoined The Times, where he remained a columnist until shortly before his death. In his Memoirs, published in 2011, he wrote of Murdoch: "Looking back, he has been an excellent proprietor for the Times, but also for Fleet Street."

Rees-Mogg was a member of the BBC's Board of Governors and chairman of the Arts Council, overseeing a major reform of the latter body which halved the number of arts organisations receiving regular funding and reduced the Council's direct activities. Having been High Sheriff of Somerset from 1978 to 1979, he was appointed a Knight Bachelor in the 1981 Birthday Honours and knighted by Elizabeth II in an investiture ceremony at Buckingham Palace on 3 November 1981. In the 1988 Birthday Honours, Rees-Mogg was made a life peer on 8 August that year as Baron Rees-Mogg, of Hinton Blewitt in the County of Avon, and sat in the House of Lords as a cross-bencher, having twice attempted to become a Conservative MP in the 1950s. He was a member of the European Reform Forum. The University of Bath awarded him an Honorary Degree (Doctor of Laws) in 1977.

He co-authored, with James Dale Davidson, three books on the general topic of financial investment and the future of capitalism: Blood in the Streets, The Great Reckoning, and The Sovereign Individual. Published in 1997, The Sovereign Individual argues that in an internet age the nation state will become outmoded, and an era of the individual will develop. Peter Thiel, the co-founder of PayPal, stated in 2014 that The Sovereign Individual was the most influential book he had read. The Sovereign Individual has had a strong influence on neoreactionary (NRx) politics.

Writing in The Times in 2001, Lord Rees-Mogg, who had a house in Somerset, described himself as "a country person who spends most of his time in London", and attempted to define the characteristics of a "country person". He also wrote that Tony Blair was as unpopular in rural England as Mrs Thatcher had been in Scotland. By now his liberal attitude to drugs policy had led to his being mocked as "Mogadon Man" by Private Eye. The magazine later referred to him as "Mystic Mogg" (a pun on "Mystic Meg", a tabloid astrologer) because of the perception that his economic and political predictions were ultimately found to be inaccurate.

Rees-Mogg served as the chairman of the London publishing firm Pickering & Chatto Publishers and of NewsMax Media and wrote a weekly column for The Mail on Sunday. He also collected 18th-century literature.

== Personal life ==
Rees-Mogg and his wife Gillian Shakespeare Morris (b. 1939) married in 1962. She is the daughter of Thomas Richard Morris, who was a lorry driver and later a car salesman. Rees-Mogg became a Conservative councillor and Mayor in the Borough of St Pancras, and later councillor for the Kings Cross ward of the London Borough of Camden. He was also a Justice of the peace.

They had five children. They are:

- The Honourable Emma Beatrice Rees-Mogg (born 1962), who married David William Hilton Craigie in 1990. The couple have four children. She is a novelist under the name Emma Craigie.
- The Honourable Charlotte Louise Rees-Mogg (born 1964)
- The Honourable Thomas Fletcher Rees-Mogg (born 1966), who married Modwenna Northcote in 1996. The couple have four children.
- The Right Honourable Sir Jacob William Rees-Mogg (born 24 May 1969), who was elected Conservative MP for the new constituency of North East Somerset in 2010, serving until 2024, after having stood unsuccessfully as a candidate for the Conservative Party in the 1997 and 2001 general elections (in Central Fife and The Wrekin respectively). He married Helena de Chair in 2007. The couple have six children. In July 2019, he was appointed Leader of the House of Commons and Lord President of the Council in the Johnson ministry.
- The Honourable Annunziata Mary Rees-Mogg (born 25 March 1979), who stood unsuccessfully as a candidate for the Conservative Party in the 2005 general election in Aberavon, and in Somerton and Frome at the 2010 election. She was elected as a Member of the European Parliament for the Brexit Party in 2019. She is married to Matthew Glanville and has two children.

Rees-Mogg, a Roman Catholic, argued that the image of an ultra-conservative papacy is false and that the Vatican must overhaul its PR machine (as of 2009).

In 1964, Rees-Mogg purchased Ston Easton Park near Bath, Somerset, the former home of the Hippisley family. The house had been threatened with demolition, and Rees-Mogg partially restored it. He sold the house to the Smedley family in 1978.

== Death ==
Afflicted by oesophageal cancer, he became seriously ill just before Christmas 2012, and died in London on 29 December at the age of 84. Rees-Mogg's funeral was held at Westminster Cathedral on 9 January 2013, with his body being buried in the graveyard of the Church of St James at Cameley in the county of Somerset.

Coat of arms of William Rees-Mogg
| Coronet A Coronet of a Baron Crest 1st, between two Spearheads erect Sable a Cock proper (Mogg); 2nd, a Swan Argent wings elevated Or holding in the beak a Water-Lily slipped proper Escutcheon Quarterly, 1st and 4th, Argent on a Fess Pean between three Ermine Spots each surmounted by a Crescent Gules a Cock Or (Mogg); 2nd and 3rd, Gules a Chevron engrailed Erminois between three Swans Argent wings elevated Or (Rees) Motto Cura Pii Diis Sunt (The pious are in the care of the Gods) |

== In popular culture ==
Rees-Mogg was the inspiration for the character of the machiavellist journalist and publisher "Somerset Lloyd-James" in Alms for Oblivion, a ten-novel sequence written by Simon Raven, a former classmate at Charterhouse. Rees-Mogg was referred to as "William Really-Smug" by the satirical magazine Private Eye.

== Books ==
- The reigning error: The crisis of world inflation (1975)
- An Humbler Heaven (1977) ISBN 9780241896921
- Blood in the Streets: Investment Profits in a World Gone Mad (1986, with James Dale Davidson) ISBN 9780671627355
- Picnics on Vesuvius: Steps towards the millennium (1992) ISBN 0283061472
- The Great Reckoning: How the World Will Change Before the Year 2000 (1992, with James Dale Davidson) ISBN 9780330327923
- The Sovereign Individual: Mastering the Transition to the Information Age (1997, with James Dale Davidson) ISBN 9780684832722

== See also ==
- Self-ownership
- R v Secretary of State for Foreign and Commonwealth Affairs, ex p Rees-Mogg

== Sources ==
- Rees-Mogg, William (2011). Memoirs. HarperPress. ISBN 978-0-002-57183-8.

== Notes ==
Media offices
| Preceded by ? | Deputy Editor of The Sunday Times; 1964–1967 | Succeeded by Frank Giles |
| Preceded by William Haley | Editor of The Times; 1967–1981 | Succeeded by Harold Evans |
Cultural offices
| Preceded by Kenneth Robinson | Chair of the Arts Council of Great Britain; 1982–1989 | Succeeded by Peter Palumbo |
