= R v Secretary of State for Foreign and Commonwealth Affairs, ex parte Rees-Mogg =

English legal case on the legality of the Maastricht Treaty

- Court: High Court of Justice
- Decided: July 30, 1993
- Citation: [1994] QB 552

R v Secretary of State for Foreign and Commonwealth Affairs, ex parte Rees-Mogg was an English legal case in which Times journalist and life peer William Rees-Mogg, challenged the legality of the Maastricht Treaty by judicial review. The case was based on Rees-Mogg's call for a declaration that by ratifying the Treaty on European Union, the Government transferred certain prerogative powers without statutory authority.

The case is notable for its liberal approach to the question of standing in judicial review cases. The principle of parliamentary sovereignty will not therefore be affected since such making of treaty does not change any domestic law.
