= Temple Cloud =

Village in the Chew Valley, Somerset, England

Coordinates: 51.3197°N 2.5432°W

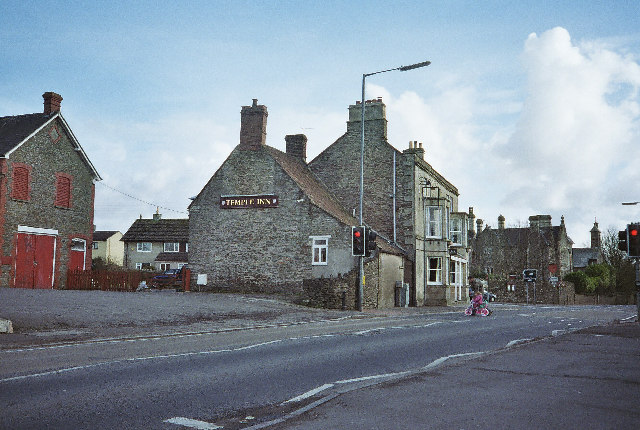
- The Temple Inn

- Location within Somerset
- Population: approx. 1,000
- OS grid reference: ST621580
- Civil parish: Temple Cloud with Cameley
- Unitary authority: Bath and North East Somerset
- Ceremonial county: Somerset
- Region: South West
- Country: England
- Sovereign state: United Kingdom
- Post town: BRISTOL
- Postcode district: BS39
- Dialling code: 01761
- Police: Avon and Somerset
- Fire: Avon
- Ambulance: South Western
- UK Parliament: North East Somerset and Hanham

Temple Cloud (grid reference ST621580) is a village in the Chew Valley in Somerset on the A37 road. It is in the civil parish of Temple Cloud with Cameley and in the council area of Bath and North East Somerset. It is 10 miles (16 km) from Bristol and 5 miles (8 km) from the town of Midsomer Norton. The villages of Cameley and Clutton are nearby.

The Temple in the place name possibly relates to the Knights Templar who held the manors of Cameley and Cloud around 1200. Cloud is thought to come from the personal name Cloda. It has been suggested that Cloud derives from the Old English ‘clud’ meaning rocky outcrop (the neighbouring village Clutton has the same derivation).

There were several coal mines in and around the village as a part of the Somerset coalfield, but these have all since closed.

== Government and politics ==
Temple Cloud is part of the Mendip Ward, which is represented by one councillor on the Bath and North East Somerset Unitary Authority, which has responsibilities for services such as education, refuse, tourism etc. Mendip ward stretches from Temple Cloud to East Harptree. The total population of the ward taken at the 2011 census was 2,683.

The village is a part of the North East Somerset and Hanham constituency. Prior to Brexit in 2020, it was a part of the South West England constituency of the European Parliament.

== Demographics ==
According to the 2001 Census, the Mendip Ward (which includes West Harptree and Hinton Blewett), had 1,465 residents, living in 548 households, with an average age of 39.0 years. Of these 79% of residents describing their health as 'good', 22% of 16- to 74-year-olds had no qualifications; and the area had an unemployment rate of 1.5% of all economically active people aged 16–74. In the Index of Multiple Deprivation 2004, it was ranked at 25,387 out of 32,482 wards in England, where 1 was the most deprived LSOA and 32,482 the least deprived.

== Church ==
Temple Cloud is included in the Anglican parish of Clutton with Cameley.
Its church is located in the centre of the village; built in the 1920s, it was dedicated to St Barnabas in 1926.

== Notable buildings ==
Temple Cloud has a number of buildings that are listed for their historical or heritage value, including the Temple Inn.

The Old Court is a Grade II listed former magistrates' court house with police cells, built in 1857 in baronial style.
