= East Harptree =

Village in Somerset, England

Coordinates: 51.3005°N 2.6218°W

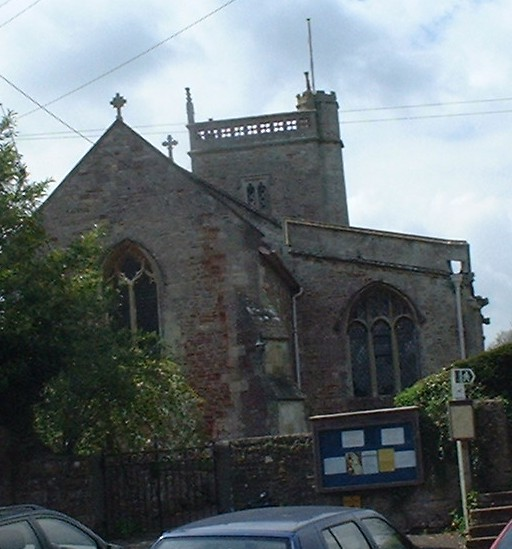
- St Laurence church at East Harptree

- Location within Somerset
- Population: 644 (2011)
- OS grid reference: ST566559
- Civil parish: East Harptree
- Unitary authority: Bath and North East Somerset
- Ceremonial county: Somerset
- Region: South West
- Country: England
- Sovereign state: United Kingdom
- Post town: BRISTOL
- Postcode district: BS40
- Dialling code: 01761
- Police: Avon and Somerset
- Fire: Avon
- Ambulance: South Western
- UK Parliament: North East Somerset and Hanham

East Harptree is a village and civil parish in Somerset, England. It is situated 5 miles (8.0 km) north of Wells and 15 miles (24.1 km) south of Bristol, on the northern slope of the Mendip Hills overlooking the Chew Valley. The parish has a population of 644. The parish includes the hamlet of Coley.

== History ==
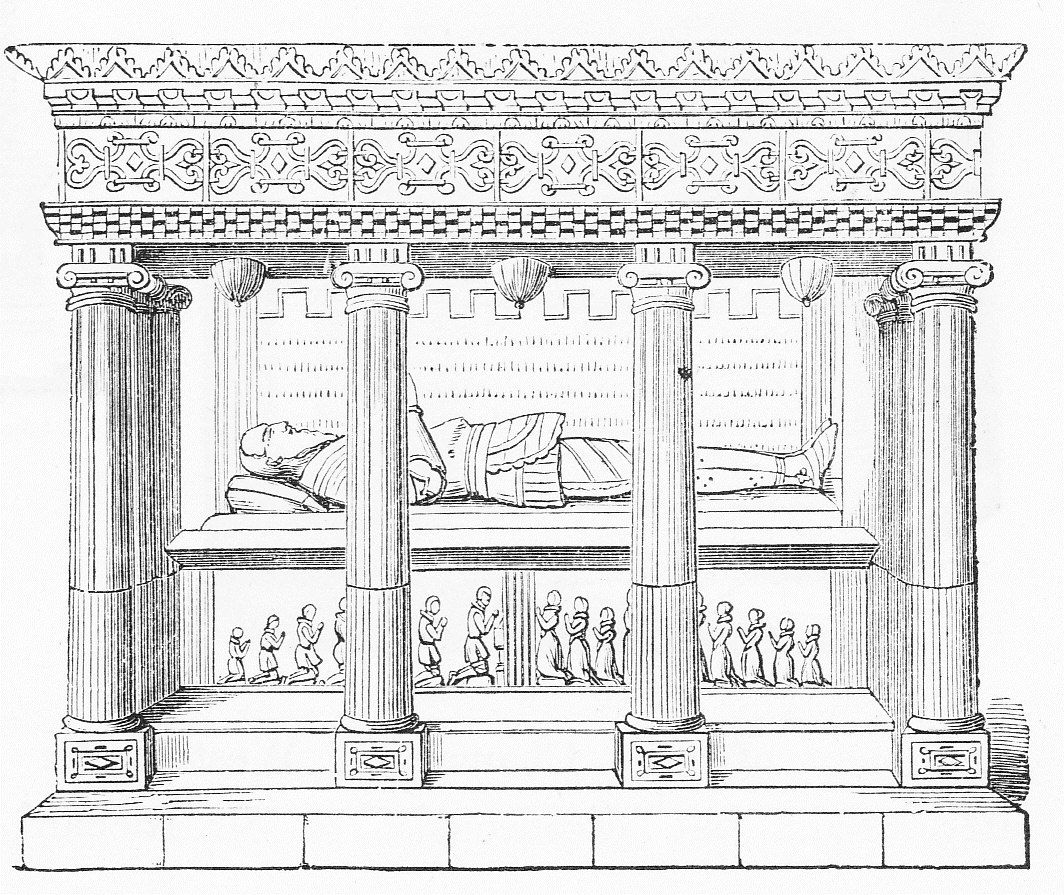
Monument to Sir John Newton (d.1568), in the Church of St Laurence

The origin of the place-name, which is first recorded in, but obviously pre-dates, Domesday Book, is not clear - the second element is undoubtedly Old English trēow, 'a tree', but the meaning of the first element is contested. Smith, and others, consider that in this case, Middle English harp- has been reduced from Old English here-pæð, to give a meaning of something like 'the tree on or associated with a main road'. However, Michael Costen suggests instead that the name could be 'harper's tree or gallows'.

In November 1887, while searching for the source of a spring, a labourer called William Currell put his pick into a pewter vessel full of Roman coins. The jar was 6 inches (15 cm) below the surface in swampy ground. It contained 1,496 coins, five ingots of silver and a ring. The coins covered the period between the reigns of Constantine the Great and Gratian.

The parish was part of the Winterstoke Hundred.

Around 1870-1880 the 'East Harptree Lead Works Co Ltd' mined the area around the village for lead, but this seems to have been largely unsuccessful and did not last for many years. Smitham Chimney is a visible reminder of the work.

== Governance ==
The parish council has responsibility for local issues, including setting an annual precept (local rate) to cover the council’s operating costs and producing annual accounts for public scrutiny. The parish council evaluates local planning applications and works with the local police, district council officers, and neighbourhood watch groups on matters of crime, security, and traffic. The parish council's role also includes initiating projects for the maintenance and repair of parish facilities, such as the village hall or community centre, playing fields and playgrounds, as well as consulting with the district council on the maintenance, repair, and improvement of highways, drainage, footpaths, public transport, and street cleaning. Conservation matters (including trees and listed buildings) and environmental issues are also of interest to the council.

Along with West Harptree and Hinton Blewett, East Harptree is part of the Mendip ward which is represented by one councillor on the unitary authority of Bath and North East Somerset which was created in 1996, as established by the Local Government Act 1992. It provides a single tier of local government with responsibility for almost all local government functions within its area including local planning and building control, local roads, council housing, environmental health, markets and fairs, refuse collection, recycling, cemeteries, crematoria, leisure services, parks, and tourism. It is also responsible for education, social services, libraries, main roads, public transport, trading standards, waste disposal and strategic planning, although fire, police and ambulance services are provided jointly with other authorities through the Avon Fire and Rescue Service, Avon and Somerset Constabulary and the Great Western Ambulance Service.

Bath and North East Somerset's area covers part of the ceremonial county of Somerset but it is administered independently of the non-metropolitan county. Its administrative headquarters is in Bath. Between 1 April 1974 and 1 April 1996, it was the Wansdyke district and the City of Bath of the county of Avon. Before 1974 that the parish was part of the Clutton Rural District.

The parish is represented in the House of Commons of the Parliament of the United Kingdom as part of North East Somerset and Hanham. It elects one Member of Parliament (MP) by the first past the post system of election. It was also part of the South West England constituency of the European Parliament, prior to Britain leaving the European Union in January 2020, which elected six MEPs using the d'Hondt method of party-list proportional representation.

== Coley ==
Coley is a hamlet in East Harptree parish just off the B3114. It is near the Litton Reservoirs which is popular with dog walkers. The hamlet has roughly 100 people living there and has no amenities. Coley is quite often (and wrongly) mistaken to be in the Litton parish. A water mill at Coley is mentioned in a document of 1675, but it remains to be proven whether this lay on the same site as the mill(s) recorded in Domesday Book at East Harptree. Coley Mill is shown on OS maps well into the 20th century, but it no longer exists - is not clear exactly when it was removed. Coley has a little bridge going through the centre which has the River Chew running under the bridge.

== Demographics ==
According to the 2001 census the Mendip ward (which includes West Harptree and Hinton Blewett), had 1,465 residents, living in 548 households, with an average age of 39.0 years. Of these, 79% of residents described their health as 'good', 22% of 16- to 74-year-olds had no qualifications, and the area had an unemployment rate of 1.5% of all economically active people aged 16–74. In the Index of Multiple Deprivation 2004, it was ranked at 25,387 out of 32,482 wards in England, where 1 was the most deprived LSOA and 32,482 the least deprived.

== Geography ==
The nearby Harptree Combe is a Site of Special Scientific Interest (SSSI), and slightly further southwest towards Priddy are the Lamb Leer Cavern and Wurt Pit and Devil's Punchbowl SSSIs.

== Landmarks ==
=== Clock Tower ===
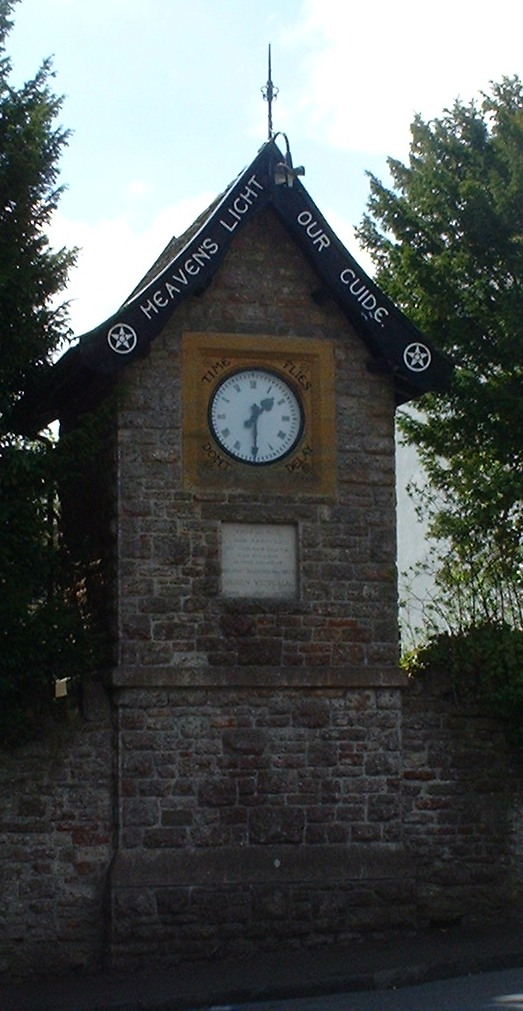
Clock Tower

An interesting and unusual clock can be seen in the centre of the village. It was a gift of Mr W.W. Kettlewell, and was erected in 1897 to commemorate the 60-year reign of Her Majesty Queen Victoria. Squared, irregular coursed rock-faced sandstone with stone dressings, plain tile roof and wooden bargeboards. Commemoration tablet beneath circular clock face set in chamfered stone surround with the inscription: 'TIME FLIES DONT DELAY' - each word in separate spandrels. Bargeboarded gable and has the wording 'HEAVEN'S LIGHT OUR GUIDE'. Set in prominent position at street junction. A Grade II listed building.

=== Richmont Castle ===
The scanty ruins of Richmont Castle are about 1/4-mile (400 m) southeast of the village church. The castle was besieged in 1138 when King Stephen captured it from Sir William de Harptree, a supporter of Queen Matilda's cause in the civil war between the king and queen. The castle was also visited by King John in 1205. The castle was demolished by its owner, Sir John Newton, in the reign of Henry VIII to build a house nearby called Eastwood.

Wade and Wade in their 1929 book Somerset described it; "On an inaccessible tongue of land at the far end of the gorge are the remains of Richmont Castle, one of those lawless strongholds which in the days of Stephen were a terror to the country side. In 1138 it was strongly garrisoned by its owner, William de Harptree, on behalf of the Empress Matilda, but was taken by Stephen by the ruse of a feigned repulse. Now, only a fragment of the keep overlooks the glen."

By the 1540s the castle was described as ruinous.

=== Harptree Court ===
Grade II listed building Harptree Court was probably built in the late 18th century. It has a Greek Doric four-column portico probably added around 1820. In 2011 and 2012, Harptree Court played host to the reality television series The Great British Bake Off. It had reportedly also been used as a filming location for a music video by the band McFly.

=== Eastwood Manor and farm ===
Eastwood Manor is a Grade II listed house built in 1871. The neighbouring farm includes Eastwood Manor Farm Steading which is a Grade I listed building built in 1860.

== Religious sites ==
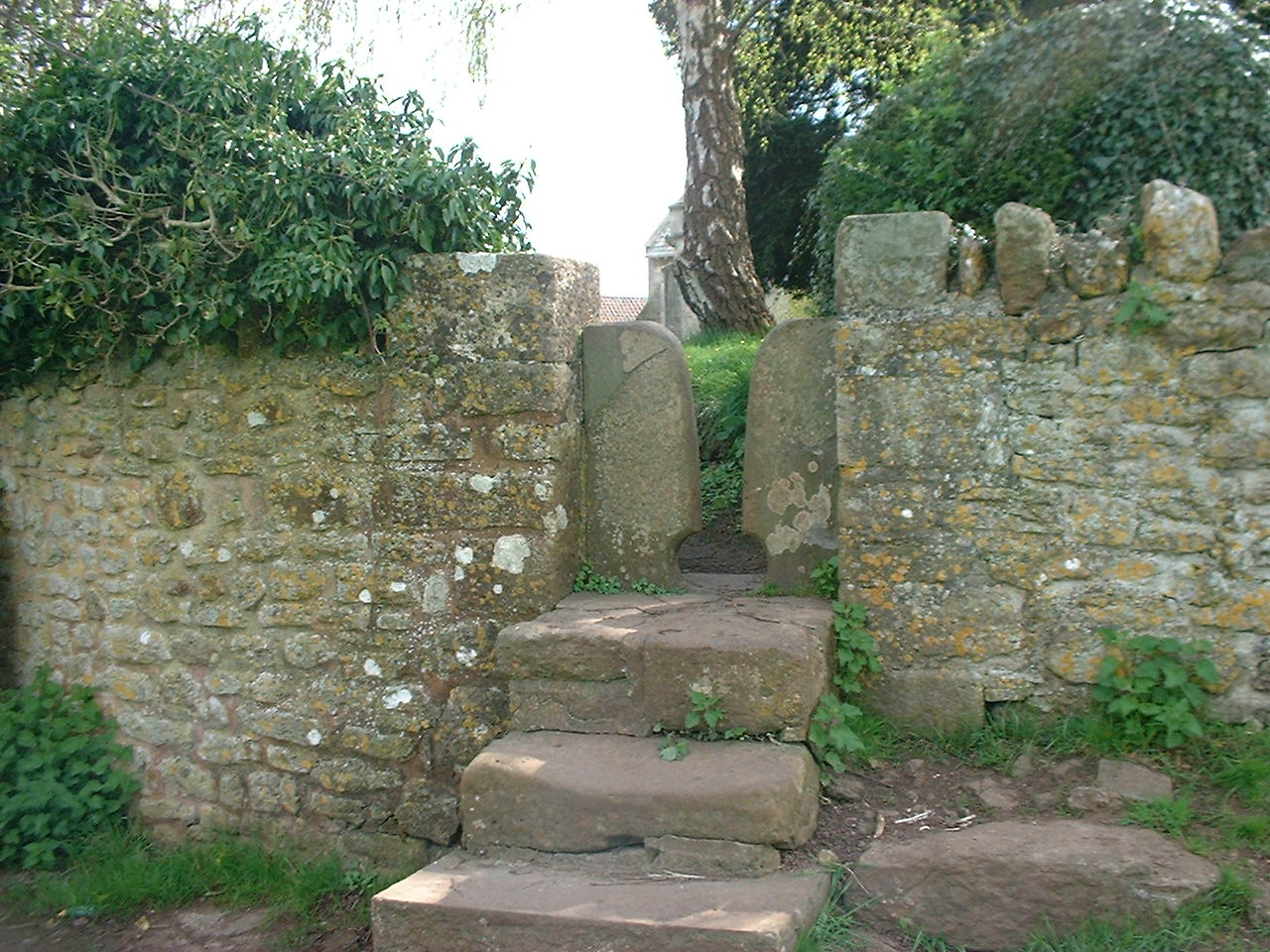
Stile in St Laurence churchyard

Following his death in 1568 Sir John's huge, canopied tomb stands in the Norman porch of the Church of St Laurence, which itself is a Grade II* listed building, parts of which date from the 12th century. Two stiles in the churchyard are also listed.

Further information and images of this church are available from:

- Church Crawler

=== Other Grade II listed buildings ===
- The Old Rectory
- Gates and piers at Upper Lodge
- Church Farmhouse and attached garden wall and gate piers
- Bridge, 50 metres north of Harptree Court
- K6 Telephone kiosk
- Manor Farmhouse
- Aqueduct in Harptree Combe
