= Hinton Blewett =

Village in Somerset, England

Coordinates: 51.3088°N 2.5832°W

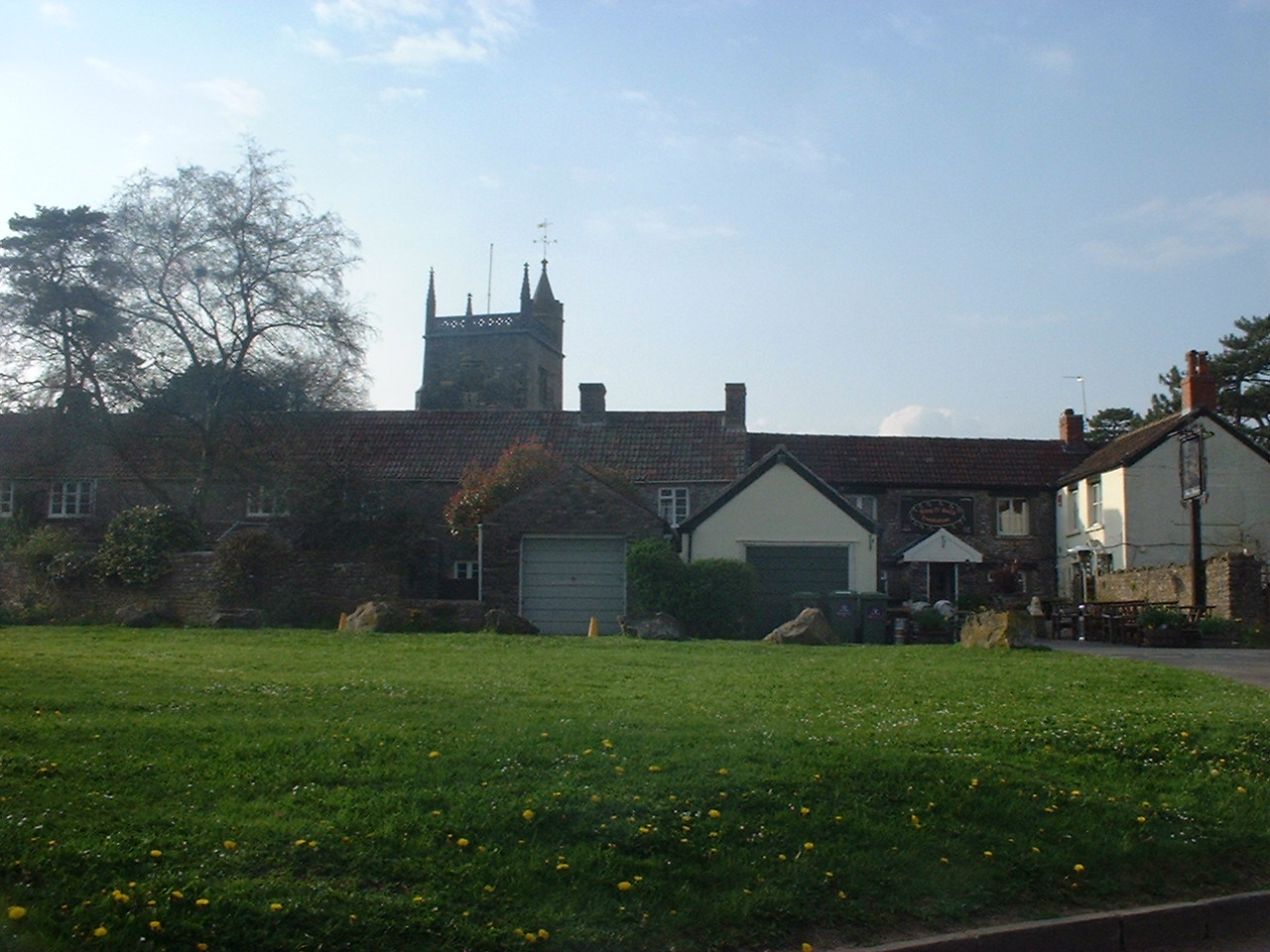
- Pub and church tower at Hinton Blewett

- Location within Somerset
- Population: 308 (2011)
- OS grid reference: ST593568
- Unitary authority: Bath and North East Somerset
- Ceremonial county: Somerset
- Region: South West
- Country: England
- Sovereign state: United Kingdom
- Post town: BRISTOL
- Postcode district: BS39
- Dialling code: 01761
- Police: Avon and Somerset
- Fire: Avon
- Ambulance: South Western
- UK Parliament: North East Somerset and Hanham

Hinton Blewett is a village and civil parish in Somerset, England, 5 miles (8.0 km) north of Wells and 15 miles (24.1 km) south of Bristol on the northern slope of the Mendip Hills, within the designated Area of Outstanding Natural Beauty (AONB) and in the Chew Valley near the source of the River Chew. The parish has a population of 308.

== History ==
An estate called Hantone is recorded in the Somerset section of Domesday Book (1086), and it was in existence as a recognised, bounded and named territorial entity before, and perhaps well before the Norman Conquest. Absolutely nothing is yet known about the nature, location or extent of any early medieval settlement at Hinton. However, with an assessment of 8 hides in the late 11th century, it was clearly a significant place, and is likely to have sustained a moderate population. Using a multiplier of five for each of the individuals recorded by Domesday, the total population at that time is likely to have been in the region of 90 people. The form of their settlement before 1066, is likely to have been a mixture of dispersed, individual farmsteads, and perhaps the beginnings of a more nucleated occupation site. It would certainly have looked nothing like the settlement morphology that we see in later maps. The Blewett part of the name is a manorial affix, deriving from the Bluet family. It is recorded before the middle of the thirteenth century. The best explanation for the toponym Hinton is that it derives from Old English hēan (a dative form of the word hēah) and tūn. The second element of this name is the single commonest place-name forming word and it has an extremely wide variety of meanings, but it stems from an ancient root word with connotations of enclosure. In most cases, settlement, estate, farmstead are probably the most notable meanings. The first element has a meaning of 'high, elevated', and topographically, this perfectly describes the situation of the present settlement. Hinton lies towards the western end of a ridge of high ground the highest point of which attains a value of 156m aOD.

The parish was part of the hundred of Chewton.

The name of the village is sometimes spelled as Hinton Blewitt. There is a village green outside the pub and church, sometimes known as the "Barbary".

William Rees-Mogg took the title of Baron Rees-Mogg, of Hinton Blewett, when he was made a life peer in 1988, although in 1998 he and his family moved to nearby Mells. Lord Rees-Mogg's children Jacob and Annunziata spent much of their childhood in the village.

== Governance ==
The parish council has responsibility for local issues, including setting an annual precept (local rate) to cover the council's operating costs and producing annual accounts for public scrutiny. The parish council evaluates local planning applications and works with the local police, unitary council officers, and neighbourhood watch groups on matters of crime, security, and traffic. The parish council's role also includes initiating projects for the maintenance and repair of parish facilities, such as the village hall or community centre, playing fields and playgrounds, as well as being consulted by the unitary council on the maintenance, repair, and improvement of highways, drainage, footpaths, public transport, and street cleaning. Conservation matters (including trees and listed buildings) and environmental issues are also of interest to the council.

Along with East and West Harptree, Hinton Blewett is part of the Mendip Ward, which is represented by one councillor on the unitary authority of Bath and North East Somerset, created in 1996, responsible for almost all local government functions, including local planning and building control, education, social services, libraries, main roads, public transport, trading standards, waste disposal, strategic planning, council housing, environmental health, markets and fairs, refuse collection, recycling, cemeteries, crematoria, leisure services, parks, and tourism. Fire, police, and ambulance services are provided by the Avon Fire and Rescue Service, the Avon and Somerset Constabulary, and the South Western Ambulance Service.

Between 1 April 1974 and 1 April 1996, Hinton Blewett was in the Wansdyke district of the county of Avon, and before 1974 was part of the Clutton Rural District of Somerset.

The parish is represented in the House of Commons as part of North East Somerset and Hanham, which elects one Member of Parliament. It was also part of the South West England constituency of the European Parliament prior to Britain leaving the European Union in January 2020, which elected six MEPs.

== Demographics ==
According to the 2001 Census, the Mendip Ward (which includes East and West Harptree), had 1,465 residents, living in 548 households, with an average age of 39.0 years. Of these 79% of residents describing their health as 'good', 22% of 16- to 74-year-olds had no qualifications; and the area had an unemployment rate of 1.5% of all economically active people aged 16–74. In the Index of Multiple Deprivation 2004, it was ranked at 25,387 out of 32,482 wards in England, where 1 was the most deprived LSOA and 32,482 the least deprived.

== Buildings ==
=== Church ===
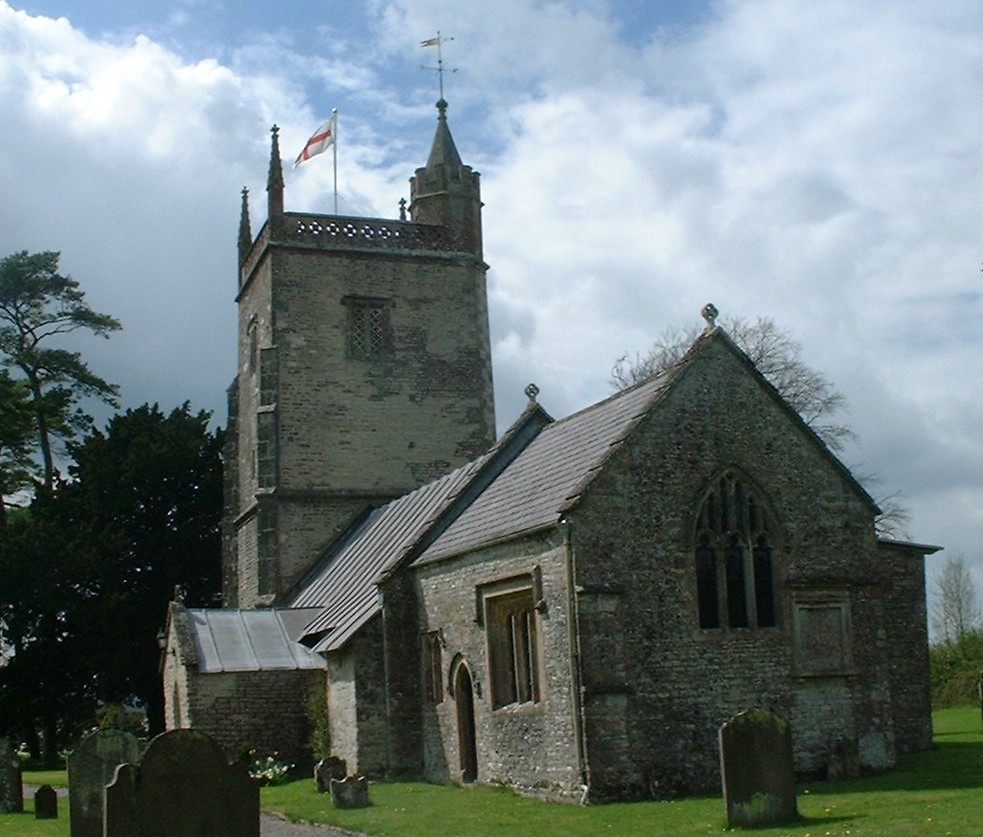
Church of St Margaret

The Church of St Margaret is largely built of Blue Lias with Doulting Stone arcade, and probably dates from the 13th century although parts are as late as the 16th or 17th century. However, as important as the church itself, is its site. This is certainly not the first church on this site, as attested by the Norman font, of late 11th or 12th century date; and because very many rural churches were merely rebuilt by the Normans, very often with stone replacing an original timber structure, it is possible to be very confident that there would have been an Anglo-Saxon church on this site by the year 1000 at the latest. The five bells were cast in 1708 by the Bilbies of Chew Stoke. It includes the coat of arms of Simon Seward (Rector 1514–59) over the doorway. The church is a Grade I listed building Historic England. "Church of St Margaret (1136547)". National Heritage List for England.

=== Grade II listed buildings ===
- Historic England. "Middle Road Farmhouse (1129574)". National Heritage List for England.
- Historic England. "K6 Telephone Kiosk (1129584)". National Heritage List for England.
- Historic England. "Coley House (1136560)". National Heritage List for England.
- Historic England. "The Manor House Farmhouse (1129572)". National Heritage List for England.
- Historic England. "The Old Rectory (1136551)". National Heritage List for England.
- Historic England. "West House Farmhouse (1129573)". National Heritage List for England.
