= West Harptree =

Village in Somerset, England

Coordinates: 51.3085°N 2.6291°W

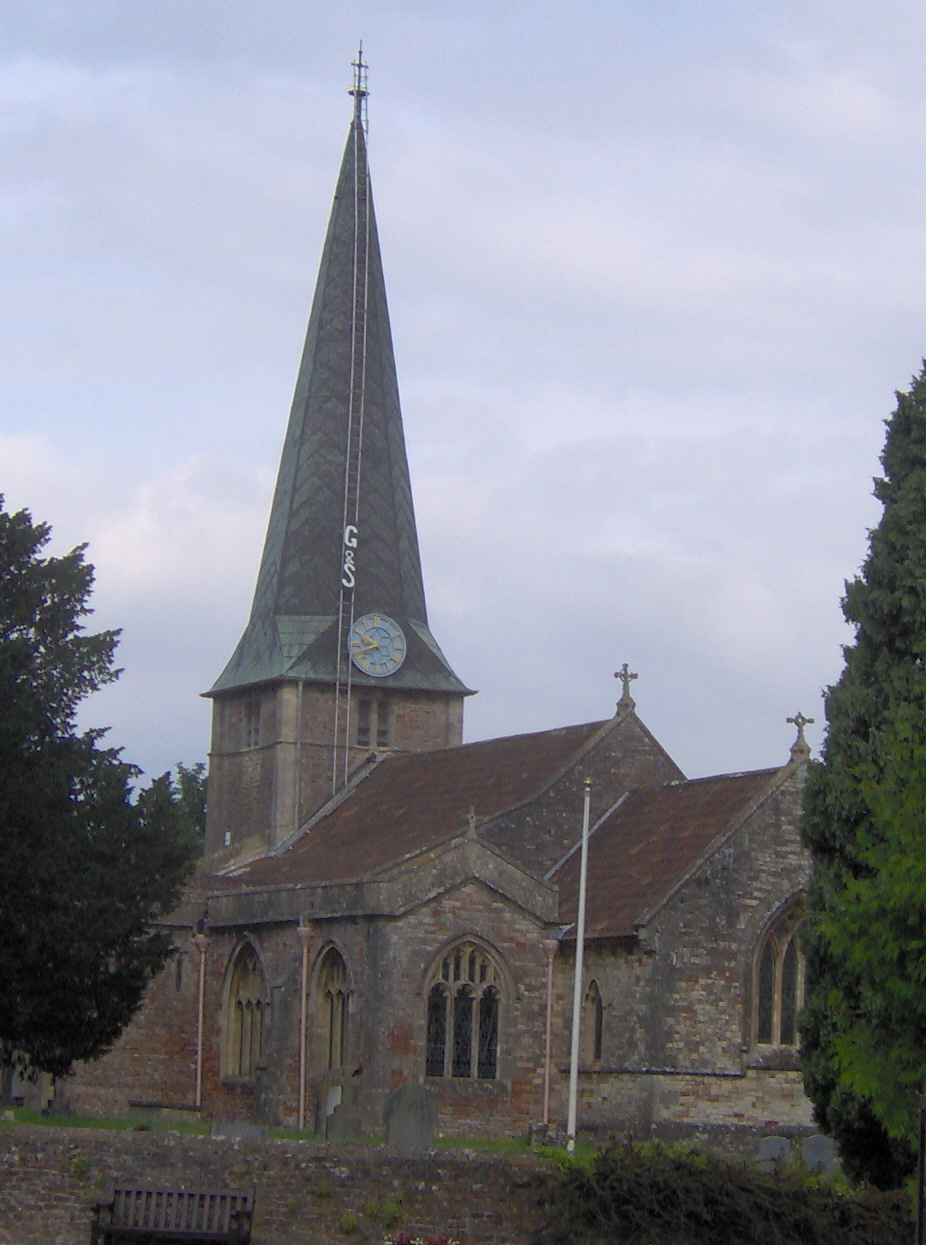
- Church of St Mary

- Location within Somerset
- Population: 439 (2011)
- OS grid reference: ST561568
- Civil parish: West Harptree
- Unitary authority: Bath and North East Somerset
- Ceremonial county: Somerset
- Region: South West
- Country: England
- Sovereign state: United Kingdom
- Post town: BRISTOL
- Postcode district: BS40
- Dialling code: 01761
- Police: Avon and Somerset
- Fire: Avon
- Ambulance: South Western
- UK Parliament: North East Somerset and Hanham

West Harptree is a small village and civil parish in the Chew Valley, Somerset within the unitary district of Bath and North East Somerset. The parish has a population of 439.

The village is 13 miles (20.9 km) south of Bristol, 15 miles (24.1 km) southwest of Bath and 17 miles (27 km) east of Weston-super-Mare. The village has a pub and several shops including a post office. With its close neighbour East Harptree the villages are collectively known as the Harptrees.

== History ==
According to Stephen Robinson it is listed in the 1086 Domesday Book as Herpetreu meaning 'The military road by the wood' from the Old English herepoep and treow.

Between 1154 and 1172 an estate at West Harptree was granted by William FitzJohn to the Knights Templar.

The shape of some of the existing fields with cross-slope and down-slope field banks and cultivated ridges forming an interleaving irregular mosaic suggest they are of medieval origin.

The parish was part of the hundred of Chewton.

== Governance ==
The parish council has responsibility for local issues, including setting an annual precept (local rate) to cover the council's operating costs and producing annual accounts for public scrutiny. The parish council evaluates local planning applications and works with the local police, district council officers, and neighbourhood watch groups on matters of crime, security, and traffic. The parish council's role also includes initiating projects for the maintenance and repair of parish facilities, such as the village hall or community centre, playing fields and playgrounds, as well as consulting with the district council on the maintenance, repair, and improvement of highways, drainage, footpaths, public transport, and street cleaning. Conservation matters (including trees and listed buildings) and environmental issues are also of interest to the council.

Along with East Harptree and Hinton Blewett, West Harptree is part of the Mendip Ward which is represented by one councillor on the unitary authority of Bath and North East Somerset which was created in 1996, as established by the Local Government Act 1992. It provides a single tier of local government with responsibility for almost all local government functions within its area including local planning and building control, local roads, council housing, environmental health, markets and fairs, refuse collection, recycling, cemeteries, crematoria, leisure services, parks, and tourism. They are also responsible for education, social services, libraries, main roads, public transport, Trading Standards, waste disposal and strategic planning, although fire, police and ambulance services are provided jointly with other authorities through the Avon Fire and Rescue Service, Avon and Somerset Constabulary and the Great Western Ambulance Service.

Bath and North East Somerset's area covers part of the ceremonial county of Somerset but it is administered independently of the non-metropolitan county. Its administrative headquarters is in Bath. Between 1 April 1974 and 1 April 1996, it was the Wansdyke district and the City of Bath of the county of Avon. Before 1974 that the parish was part of the Clutton Rural District.

The parish is represented in the House of Commons of the Parliament of the United Kingdom as part of North East Somerset and Hanham. It elects one Member of Parliament (MP) by the first past the post system of election.

== Demographics ==
According to the 2001 Census the Mendip Ward (which includes East Harptree and Hinton Blewett), had 1,465 residents, living in 548 households, with an average age of 39.0 years. Of these 79% of residents describing their health as 'good', 22% of 16- to 74-year-olds had no qualifications; and the area had an unemployment rate of 1.5% of all economically active people aged 16–74. In the Index of Multiple Deprivation 2004, it was ranked at 25,387 out of 32,482 wards in England, where 1 was the most deprived LSOA and 32,482 the least deprived.

== Landmarks ==
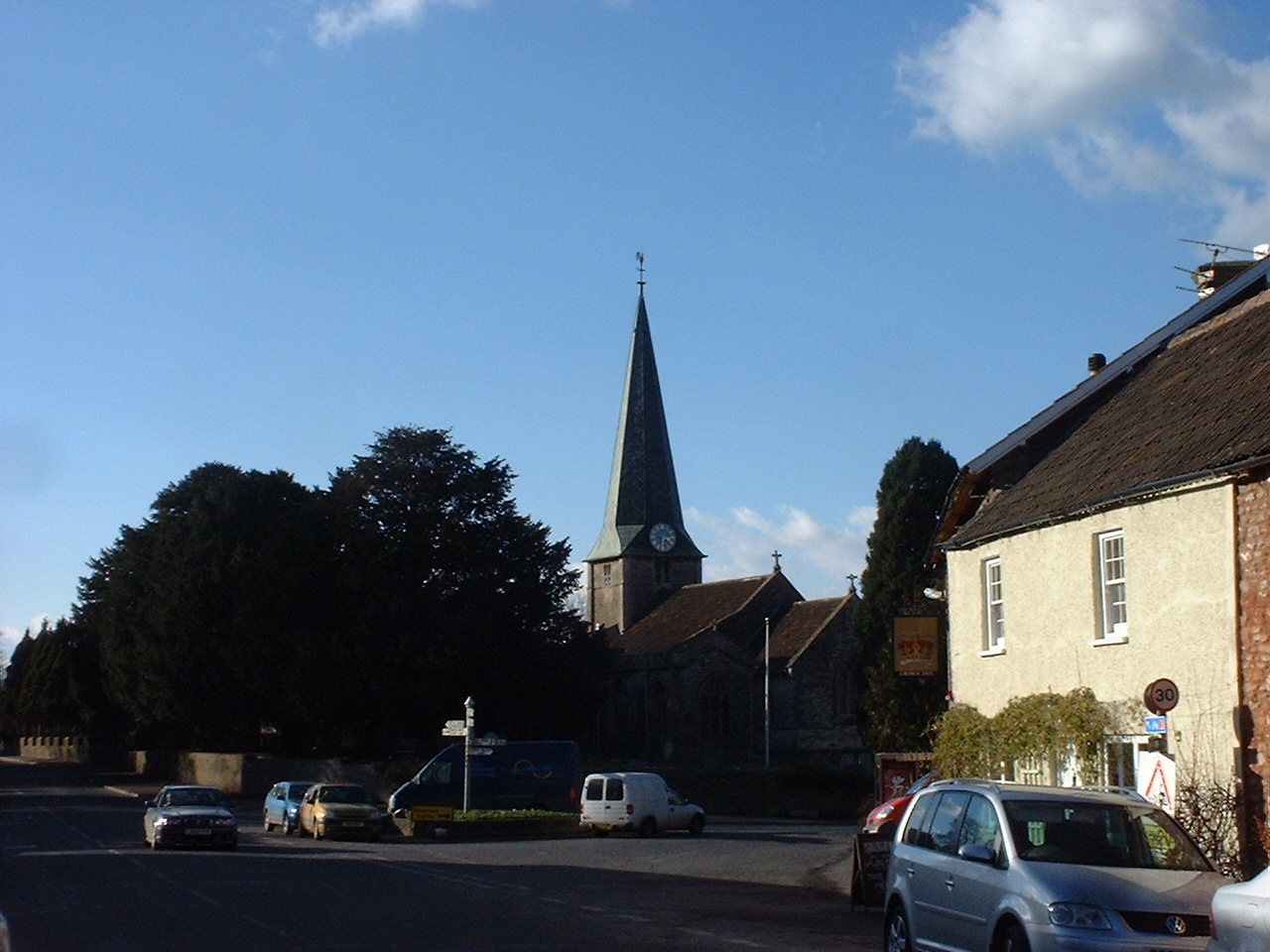
West Harptree showing the church

=== Gournay Court ===
Gournay Court is a Grade II* Country house. Circa 1600 (Historic England. "Gournay Court (1129581)". National Heritage List for England.) The entrance Gates and railings are grade II (Historic England. "Entrance Gates and Railings (1136644)". National Heritage List for England.) as are the Gatepiers to the west (Historic England. "Gatepiers to west of Gournay Court (1320763)". National Heritage List for England.)

=== Grade II listed buildings ===
- (Historic England. "Barn to north west of Gournay Court (1129582)". National Heritage List for England.)
- (Historic England. "Gatepiers to boundary wall, south of Tilley Manor Farmhouse (1136633)". National Heritage List for England.)
- (Historic England. "Tilley Manor Farmhouse (1129580)". National Heritage List for England.)
- (Historic England. "Parsonage Farmhouse (1136652)". National Heritage List for England.)
- (Historic England. "The Old Vicarage (1320764)". National Heritage List for England.)
- (Historic England. "Turnpike Parish Boundary Marker (1136657)". National Heritage List for England.)

== Religious sites ==
The Church of St Mary dates from the 12th century, although the tower is a much later addition, and is a Grade II* listed building
