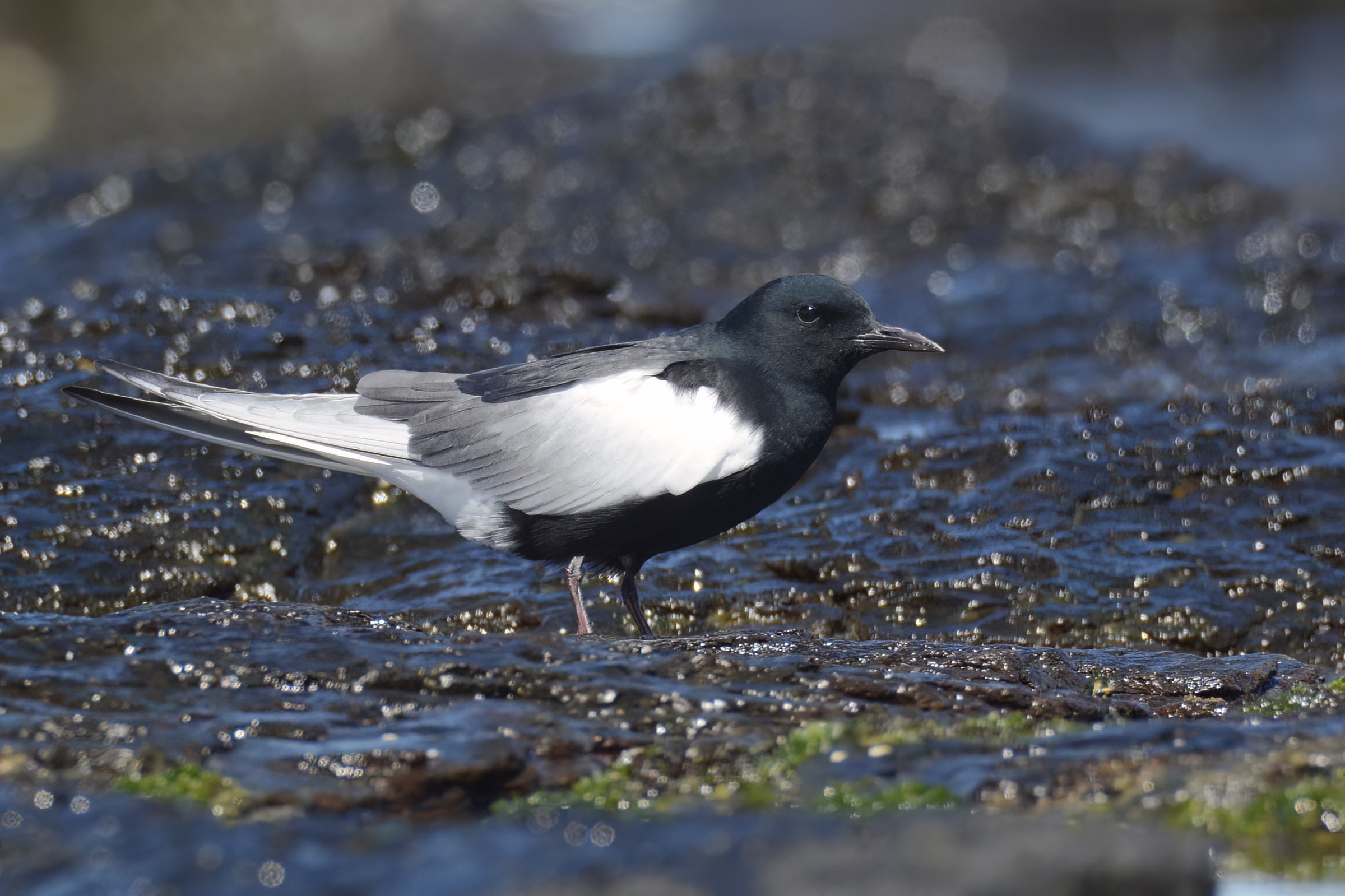

Conservation status
- Least Concern (IUCN 3.1)

Scientific classification
- Kingdom: Animalia
- Phylum: Chordata
- Class: Aves
- Order: Charadriiformes
- Family: Laridae
- Genus: Chlidonias
- Species: C. leucopterus

Binomial name
- Chlidonias leucopterus (Temminck, 1815)

Synonyms
- Chlidonias leucoptera

= White-winged tern =

Species of bird

The white-winged tern or white-winged black tern (Chlidonias leucopterus) is a species of tern in the family Laridae. It is a small species generally found in or near bodies of fresh water across much of the world, including Europe, Africa, Asia, and Australia. The genus name is from Ancient Greek khelidonios, "swallow-like", from khelidon, "swallow".

The name 'white-winged tern' is the standard in most English-speaking countries; in the United Kingdom, this name is also the one used by the formal ornithological recording authorities, but the older alternative 'white-winged black tern' is still frequent in popular use.

== Description ==
Adult birds in summer have short red legs and a short black bill (small and stubby, measuring 22–25 mm from the feathers, decidedly shorter than the head), a black neck (often with a pale gray back) and belly, very dark grey back, with a white rump and light grey (almost white) tail, which often looks 'square' in juveniles. The face is tinged yellowish. The wings, as the name implies, are mainly white. The inner wing is grayish with brown-tipped coverts. In non-breeding plumage, most of the black is replaced by white or pale grey, though a few blackish feathers may be retained, admixed with white underparts. A good deal of black shows in the underwing-coverts. The head is black, with a white forehead. The crown is blackish-brown, flecked with white, and the hindcrown is blackish with a certain amount of white flecking. These white markings are pronounced in the winter adult. There is a dark triangular patch forward of the eye. The collar is fairly broad and white. In juveniles and moulting adults, the rump is pale gray, becoming grey in both phases late in the year. The clear white collar and rump isolate the mantle as a dark brown 'saddle'. The mantle feathers have narrow paler brown tips, as have the tertials and scapulars.

== Hybridisation with black tern ==
Hybridisation between this species and black tern has been recorded from Sweden and the Netherlands. Two juvenile birds at Chew Valley Lake, England, in September 1978 and September 1981, were also believed to be hybrids; they showed mixed characters of the two species, specifically a combination of a dark mantle (a feature of white-winged black) with dark patches on the breast-side (a feature of black tern, not shown by white-winged black).

== Distribution and habitat ==
Their breeding habitat is freshwater marshes across from southeast Europe to Central Asia and the Russian Far East. They usually nest either on floating vegetation in a marsh or on the ground very close to water, laying 2–4 eggs in a nest built of small reed stems and other vegetation. In winter, they migrate to Africa, southern Asia and Australia. It is a scarce vagrant in North America, mainly on the Atlantic coast, but a few records on the Pacific coast and inland in the Great Lakes area. The species has also been recorded as a vagrant in South America, including records in Argentina, Brazil, Uruguay, and Colombia.

== Behaviour ==
Like the other "marsh" terns (Chlidonias), and unlike the "white" (Sterna) terns, these birds do not dive for fish, but fly slowly over the water to surface-pick items and catch insects in flight. They mainly eat insects and small fish. In flight, the wing-beats are shallow and leisurely.

The white-winged tern is one of the species to which the Agreement on the Conservation of African-Eurasian Migratory Waterbirds (AEWA) applies.

== Gallery ==
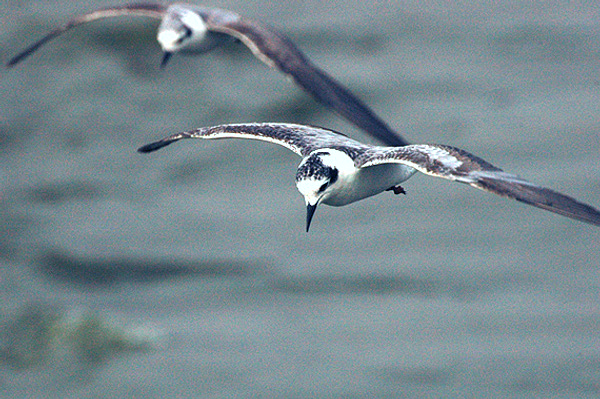
At Kazinga Channel, Uganda

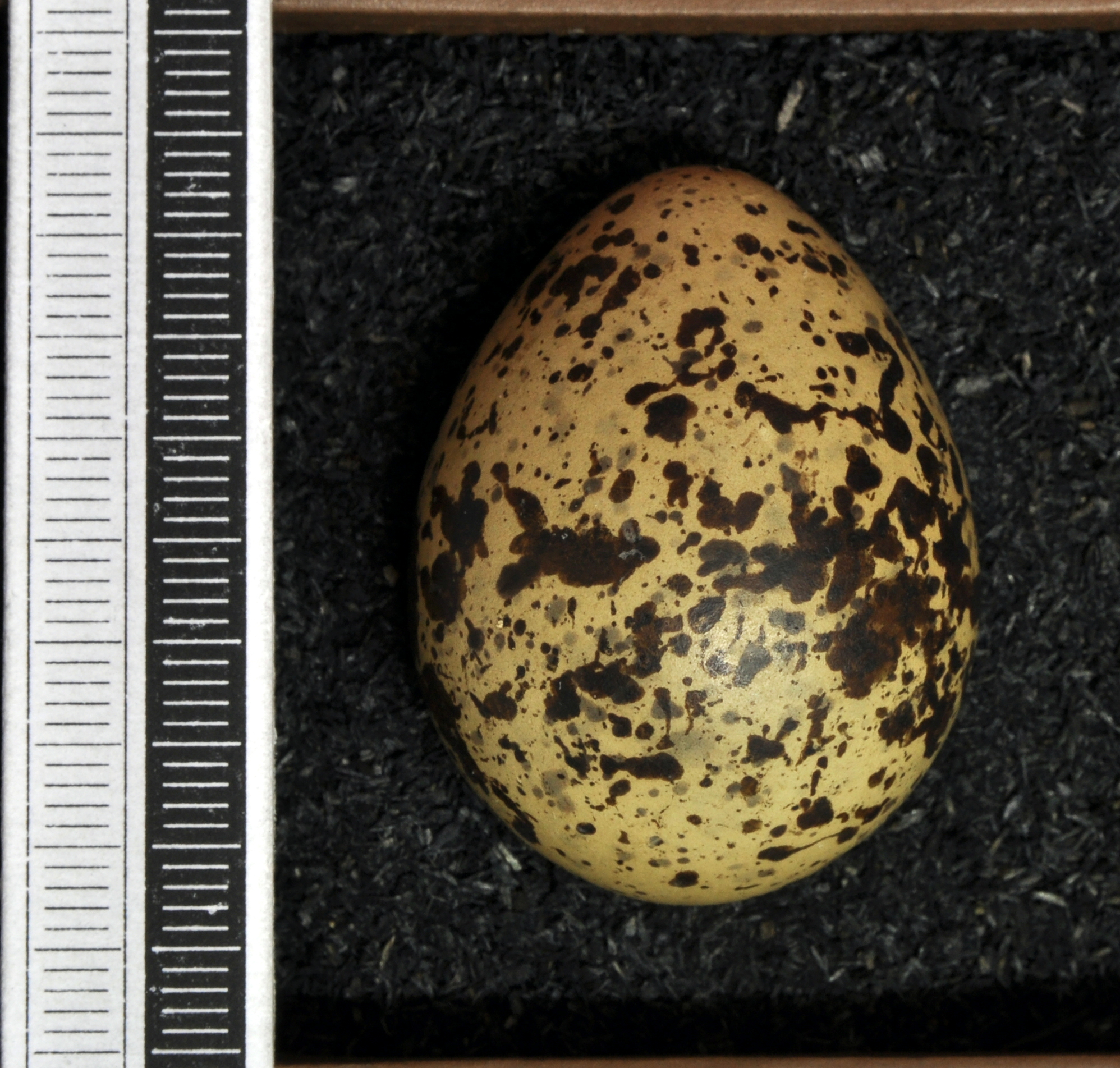
Egg in Museum Wiesbaden

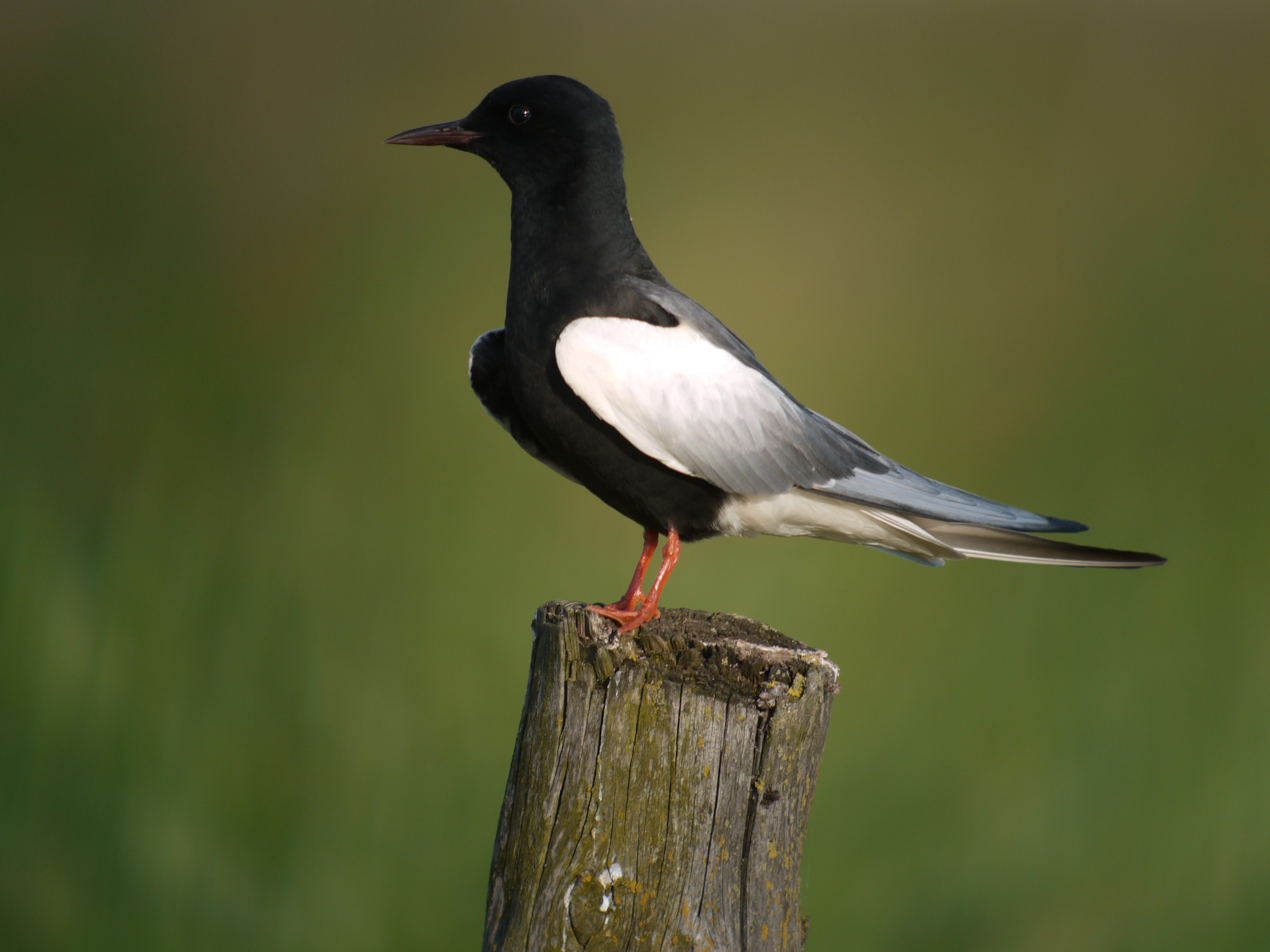
In Poland

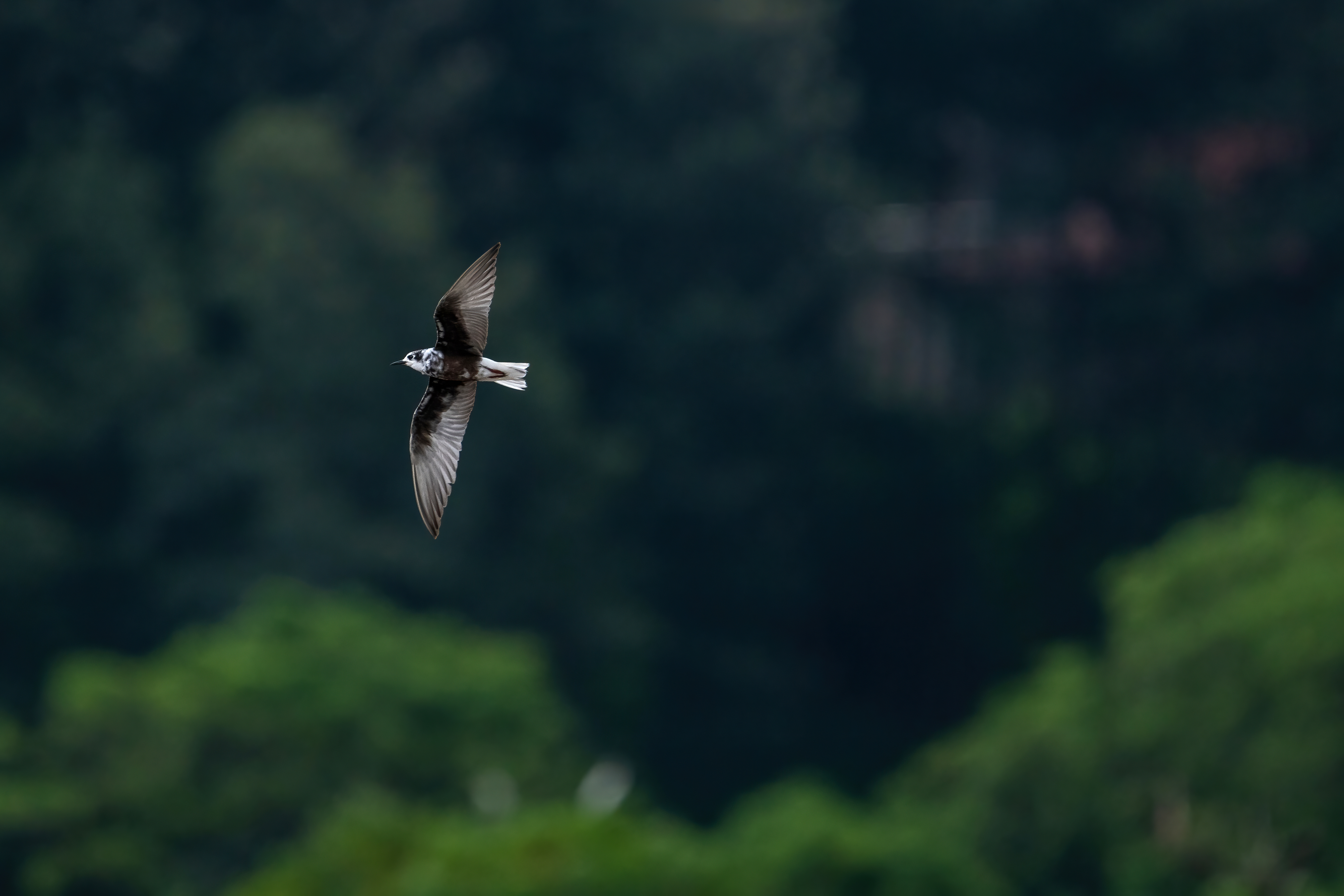
In Nepal
