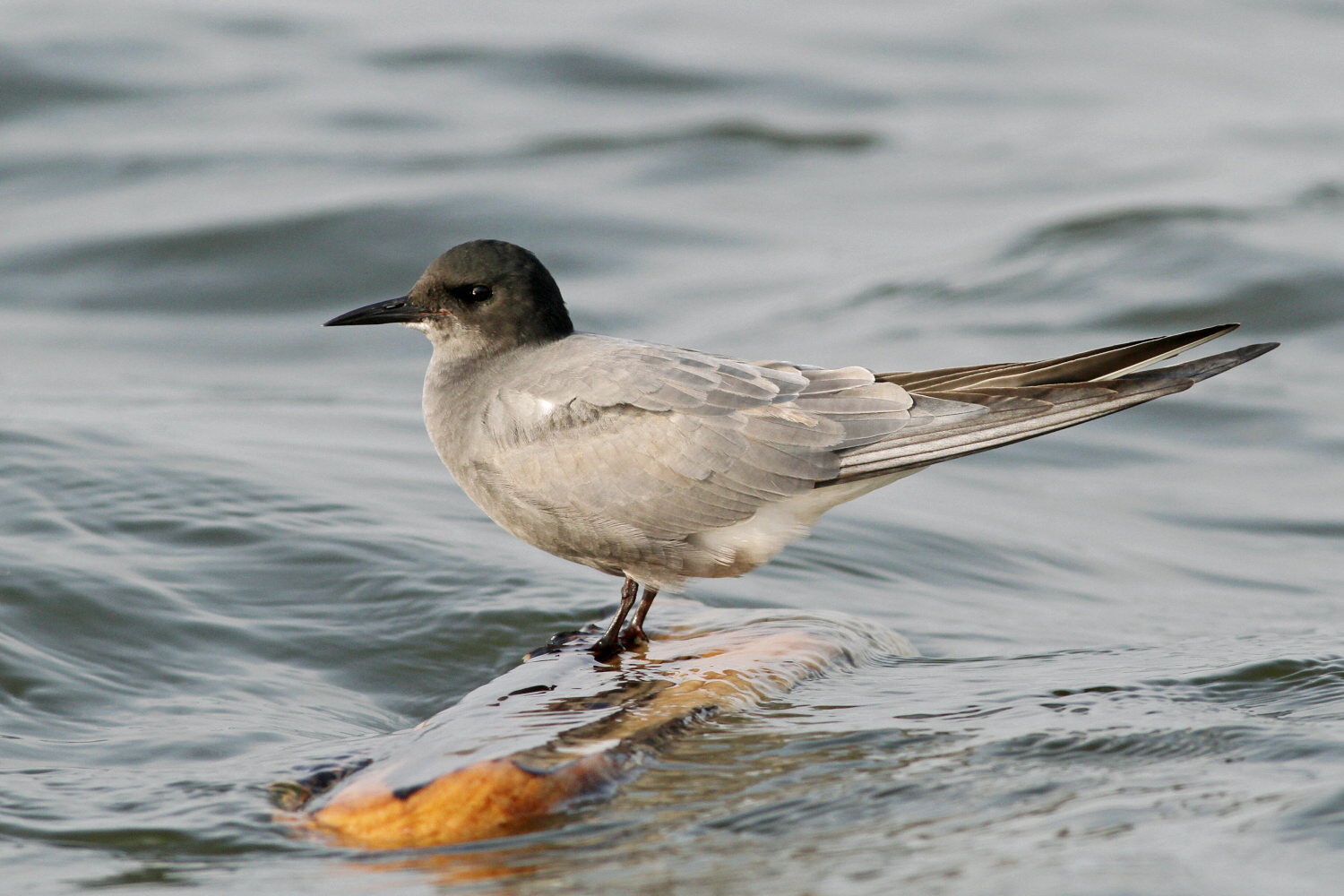

Conservation status
- Least Concern (IUCN 3.1)

Scientific classification
- Kingdom: Animalia
- Phylum: Chordata
- Class: Aves
- Order: Charadriiformes
- Family: Laridae
- Genus: Chlidonias
- Species: C. niger

Binomial name
- Chlidonias niger (Linnaeus, 1758)
- Breeding Migration Nonbreeding

Synonyms
- Sterna nigra Linnaeus, 1758

= Black tern =

Species of bird

The black tern (Chlidonias niger) is a small tern generally found in or near inland water that breeds in Europe, Western Asia and North America. In winter the birds migrate to coastal areas of Africa and South America.

== Taxonomy ==
The black tern was formally described in 1758 by the Swedish naturalist Carl Linnaeus in the tenth edition of his Systema Naturae under the binomial name Sterna nigra. Linnaeus specified the type location as Europe but it is now restricted to Uppsala in Sweden. The black tern is now one of four species placed in the genus Chlidonias that was introduced in 1822 by the French naturalist Constantine Rafinesque. The genus name is from Ancient Greek khelidonios, "swallow-like", from khelidon, "swallow": another old English name for the black tern is "carr (i.e. lake) swallow". The species name is from Latin niger "shining black". As its name suggests, it has predominantly dark plumage. In some lights it can appear blue in the breeding season, hence the old English name "blue darr".

Two subspecies are recognised. These are listed below with their breeding ranges.

Image	Subspecies	Distribution
	C. n. niger (Linnaeus, 1758)	inland Europe (except British Isles and north Scandinavia) to central Asia, central south Russia and northwest Mongolia
	C. n. surinamensis (Gmelin, JF, 1789)	inland central west Northwest Territories and east British Columbia to south James Bay and southeast Maritime Provinces (northwest to southeast Canada) to central California, Kansas, Great Lakes and Maine (northwest, central west to northeast USA)

== Description ==
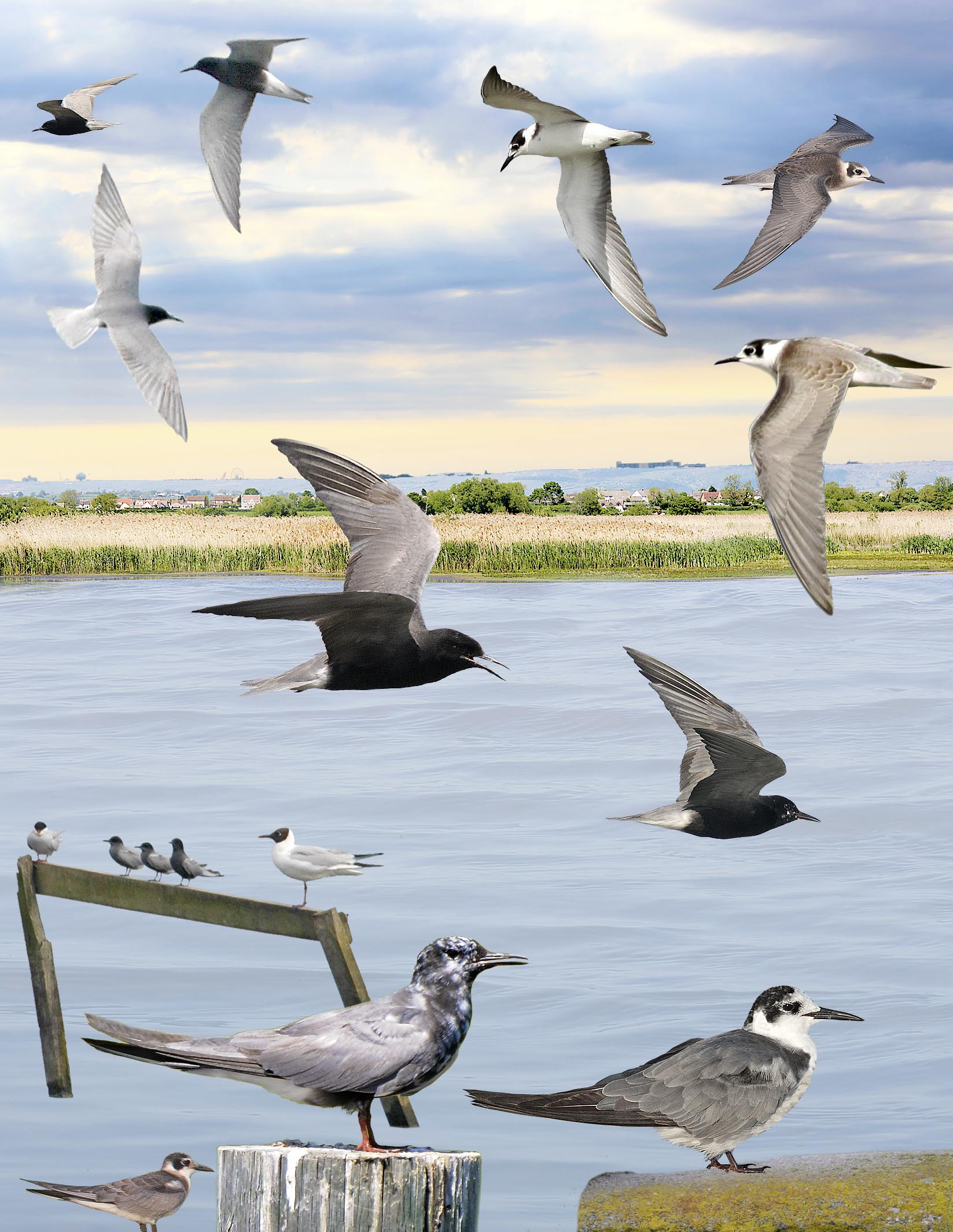
ID composite

Adults are 25 cm (10 in) long, with a wingspan 61 cm (24 in), and weigh 62 g (2 1/8 oz). They have short dark legs and a short, weak-looking black bill, measuring 27 mm (1 1/16 in), nearly as long as the head. The bill is long, slender, and looks slightly decurved. They have a dark grey back, with a white forewing, black head, neck (occasionally suffused with grey in the adult) and belly, black or blackish-brown cap (which unites in color with the ear coverts, forming an almost complete hood), and a light brownish-grey, 'square' tail. The face is white. There is a big dark triangular patch in front of the eye, and a broadish white collar in juveniles. There are greyish-brown smudges on the ides of the white breast, a downwards extension of the plumage of the upperparts. These marks vary in size and are not conspicuous. In non-breeding plumage, most of the black, apart from the cap, is replaced by grey. The plumage of the upperparts is drab, with pale feather-edgings. The rump is brownish-grey.

The North American race, C. n. surinamensis, is distinguishable from the European form in all plumages, and is considered by some to be a separate species.

In flight, the build appears slim. The wing-beats are full and dynamic, and flight is often erratic as it dives to the surface for food; similar to other tern species.

Its call has been described as a high-pitched "kik"; the sound of a large flock has been called "deafening".

== Hybridisation with white-winged tern ==
Hybridisation between this species and white-winged tern has been recorded from Sweden and the Netherlands. Two juvenile birds at Chew Valley Lake, England, in September 1978 and September 1981, were also believed to be hybrids; they showed mixed characters of the two species, specifically a combination of a dark mantle (a feature of white-winged black) with dark patches on the breast-side (a feature of black tern, not shown by white-winged black).

== Distribution and habitat ==
Their breeding habitat is freshwater marshes across most of Canada, the northern United States and much of Europe and western Asia. They usually nest either on floating material in a marsh or on the ground very close to water, laying 2–4 eggs.

In England the black tern was abundant in the eastern Fens, especially in Lincolnshire and Cambridgeshire, until the early nineteenth century. The Welsh naturalist Thomas Pennant, describing a visit made to Lincolnshire in 1769, referred to 'vast flocks' of black terns that 'almost deafen one with their clamors'. Extensive drainage of its breeding grounds wiped out the English population by about 1840. Intermittent attempts by the black tern to recolonise England have proved unsuccessful, with only a handful of English breeding records, and one in Ireland, in the second half of the twentieth century.

North American black terns migrate to the coasts of northern South America, some to the open ocean. Old World birds winter in Africa.

Unlike the "white" Sterna terns, these birds do not dive for fish, but forage on the wing picking up items at or near the water's surface or catching insects in flight. They mainly eat insects and fish as well as amphibians.

=== Vagrancy ===
The American race has occurred as a vagrant in Britain and in Ireland.

== Conservation ==
The North American population has declined in recent times due to loss of habitat.

The black tern is one of the species to which the Agreement on the Conservation of African-Eurasian Migratory Waterbirds (AEWA) applies.

== Gallery ==
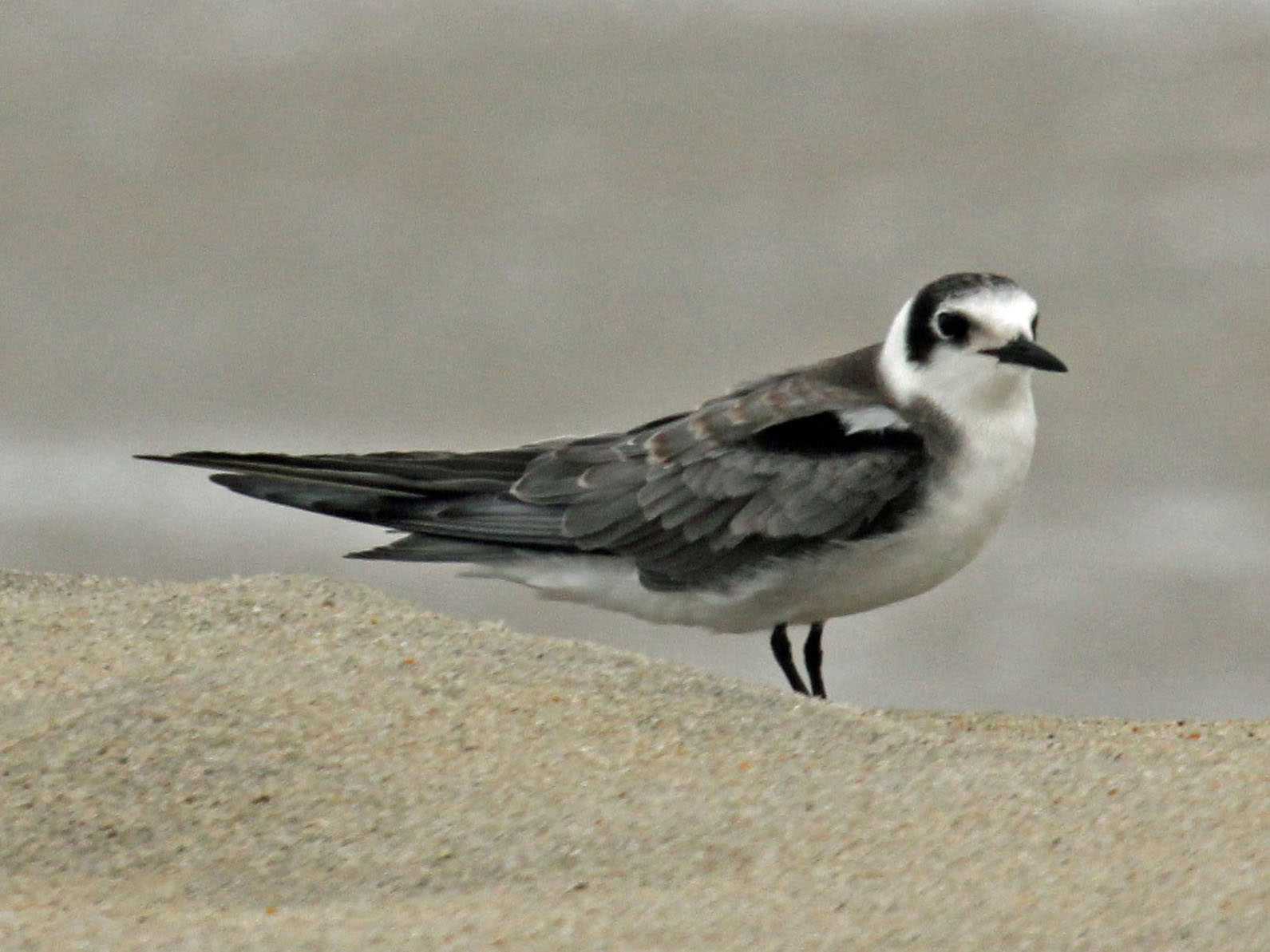
Nonbreeding

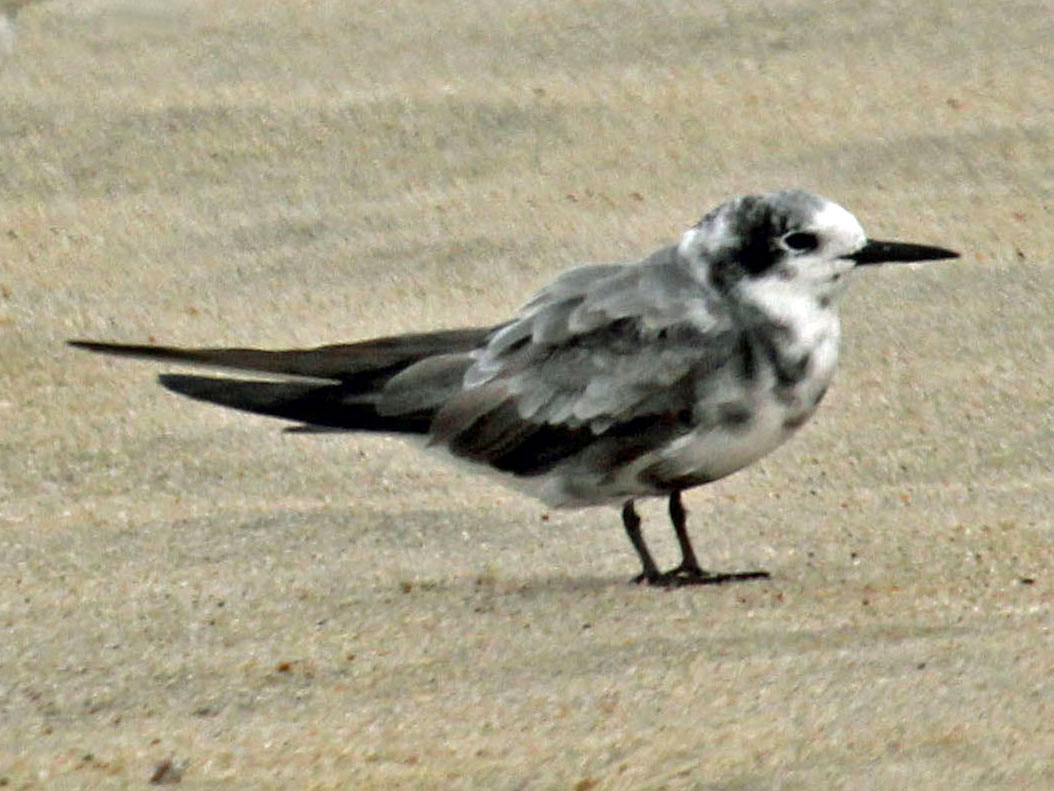
Eclipse breeding

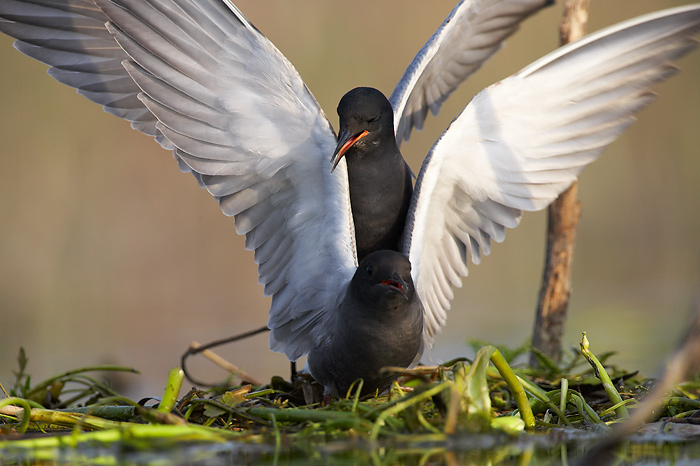
Black terns mating in Tartu County, Estonia

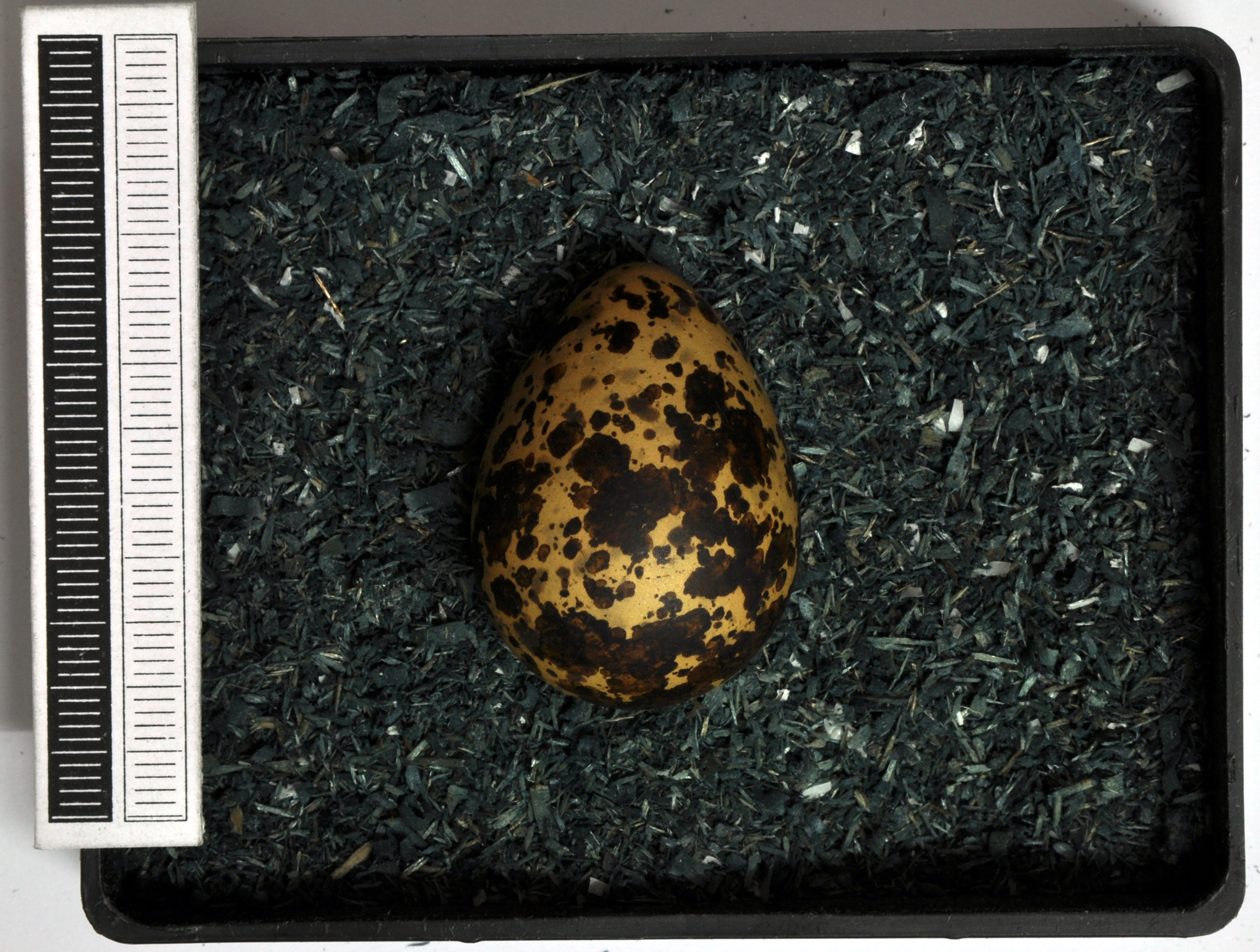
Egg, Collection Museum Wiesbaden, Germany

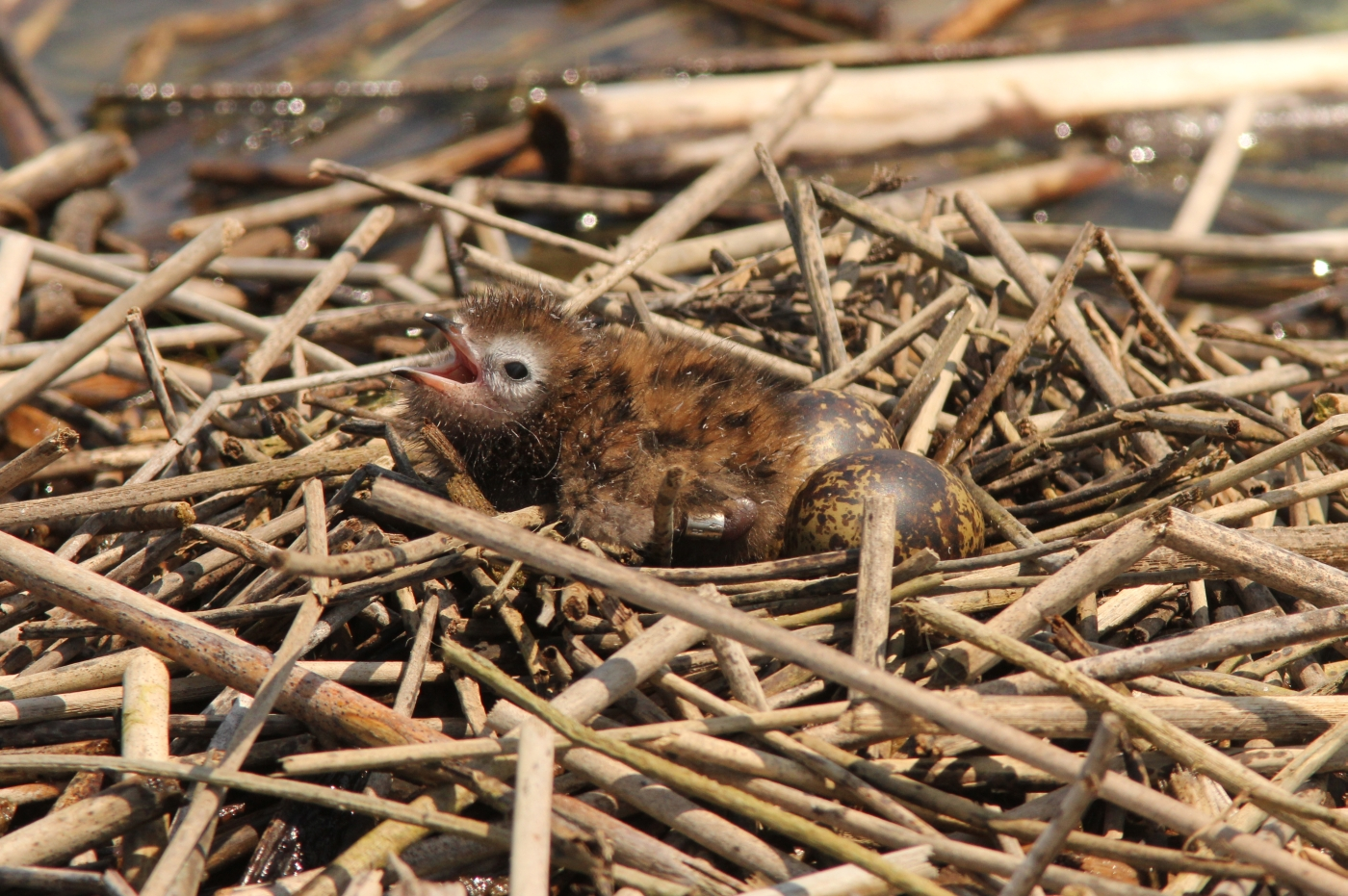
A newly hatched chick and two eggs on a nest made of floating reeds, in Ontario, Canada

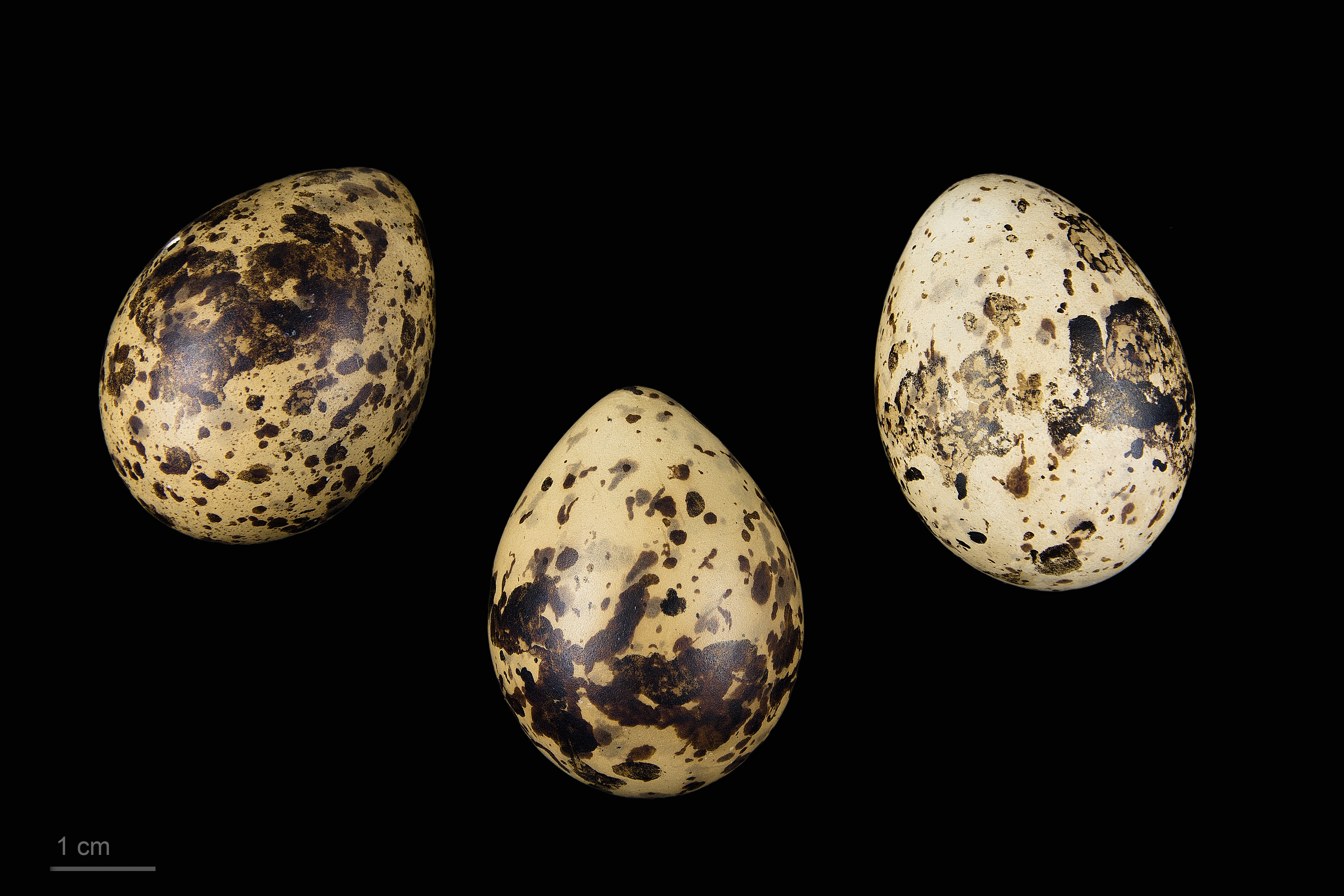
Chlidonias niger niger - MHNT
