= Ernest Greenfield =

British archaeologist

Ernest Greenfield was a British archaeologist. He served with the Royal Air Force during the Second World War. During war service he became friends with Philip Rahtz who persuaded Greenfield to take up professional archaeology. His excavations included the Great Witcombe Roman Villa, Gloucestershire (1960–1973), and Chew Valley Lake, north Somerset (1953). Greenfield grew up in Sidcup, Kent and was a schoolboy when he set out single-handedly to excavate a Roman site at Horwood's Pit, St. Pauls Cray, whilst gravel extraction operations were being carried out in the 1930s. He was not popular with the gravel company, and subsequently contacted A. H. A. Hogg for help in the investigations. Hogg later drew up a plan of the site, and sought further help for Greenfield from Norman Cook at Maidstone Museum. In a letter to Cook, preserved at the museum, Hogg stated that Greenfield 'had the right ideas, but was discouraged 'after having lost his finds and site notes off the back of his motorbike!' Later Greenfield set up a local archaeological group which discovered many new sites including the famous Lullingstone Villa.

== Bibliography ==
- Peter Leach, Lynne Bevan, Trevor Pearson (1998). Great Witcombe Roman Villa, Gloucestershire A report on excavations by Ernest Greenfield 1960-1973. Archaeopress. ISBN 0-86054-879-1.
- Unpublished letter from A. H. A. Hogg to N. Cook concerning Greenfield's early career (held in Maidstone Museum)
- Greenfield, E., 'Notes on the Archaeological Sites in the Cray Valley', The Transactions of the Dartford Antiquaries Society, 6 (1936)
