= Philip Rahtz =

British archaeologist

Philip Arthur Rahtz (11 March 1921 – 2 June 2011) was a British archaeologist.

Rahtz was born in Bristol. After leaving Bristol Grammar School, he became an accountant before serving with the Royal Air Force during the Second World War. During war service, Rahtz became friends with the archaeologist Ernest Greenfield, the excavator of Great Witcombe Roman Villa, Gloucestershire and Lullingstone Castle, Kent. This friendship sparked a personal interest in archaeology and a professional career, which began with excavations at Chew Valley Lake (north Somerset) in 1953.

A wide range of excavations in the area followed including Old Sarum in 1957, Glastonbury Tor in 1964–1966 and a Romano-Celtic Temple at Pagans Hill, Chew Stoke, from 1958. He also excavated at Bordesley Abbey, Worcestershire. Rahtz later ran summer school excavations for the University of Birmingham. He achieved his first permanent job as a lecturer at that university in 1963, and in 1978 he was appointed professor and first head of department at the University of York.

In 2003 he was awarded the Frend Medal for his outstanding contribution to the archaeology of the early Christian Church. In February 2013, a one-day conference was held in Cheddar to celebrate his life and work in Somerset.

Rahtz died in 2011 at age 90. He was married to his second wife, Lorna, with whom he had a son, Matthew. He had five other children from his first marriage: Gentian, Nicholas, Diana, David and Sebastian. The last-mentioned son worked in the digital humanities, including computer methods in archaeology.

== Selected bibliography ==
- Philip Rahtz & Susan Hirst (1976). Bordesley Abbey, Redditch, Hereford-Worcestershire : first report on excavations 1969–1973. OCLC 463160533.
- Philip Rahtz (1985). Invitation to archaeology. Blackwell. ISBN 978-0631141068. OCLC 11728349.
- Philip Rahtz, Susan Hirst & Susan M. Wright (2000). Cannington Cemetery: excavations 1962-3 of prehistoric, Roman, post-Roman, and later features at Cannington Park Quarry, near Bridgwater, Somerset. Society for the Promotion of Roman Studies. ISBN 978-0-907764-26-7.
- Philip A. Rahtz (1997). St. Mary's Church, Deerhurst, Gloucestershire fieldwork, excavations, and structural analysis, 1971–1984. Society of Antiquaries of London and the British Archaeological Association. ISBN 978-0851156873.
- Philip Rahtz (2001). Deerhurst Above and Below Ground. Friends of Deerhurst Church. ISBN 978-0-9521199-5-1.
- Philip Rahtz (2001). Living Archaeology. Tempus Publishing. ISBN 978-0-7524-1925-1.
- Philip Rahtz & Lorna Watts (2003). Glastonbury: Myth and Archaeology. Tempus Publishing. ISBN 978-0-7524-2548-1.
- Philip A. Rahtz; Lorna Watts; Trevor Ashwin; Chris Philo (2004). Wharram, a study of settlement on the Yorkshire Wolds. Department of Archaeology, University of York. ISBN 978-0946722198.
