= Chew Magna Reservoir =

Reservoir in Somerset, England

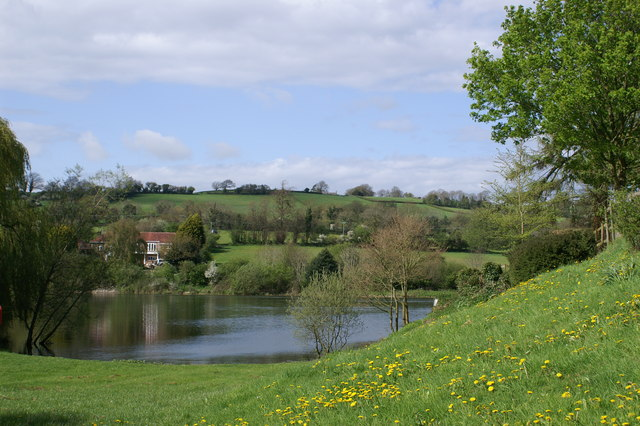

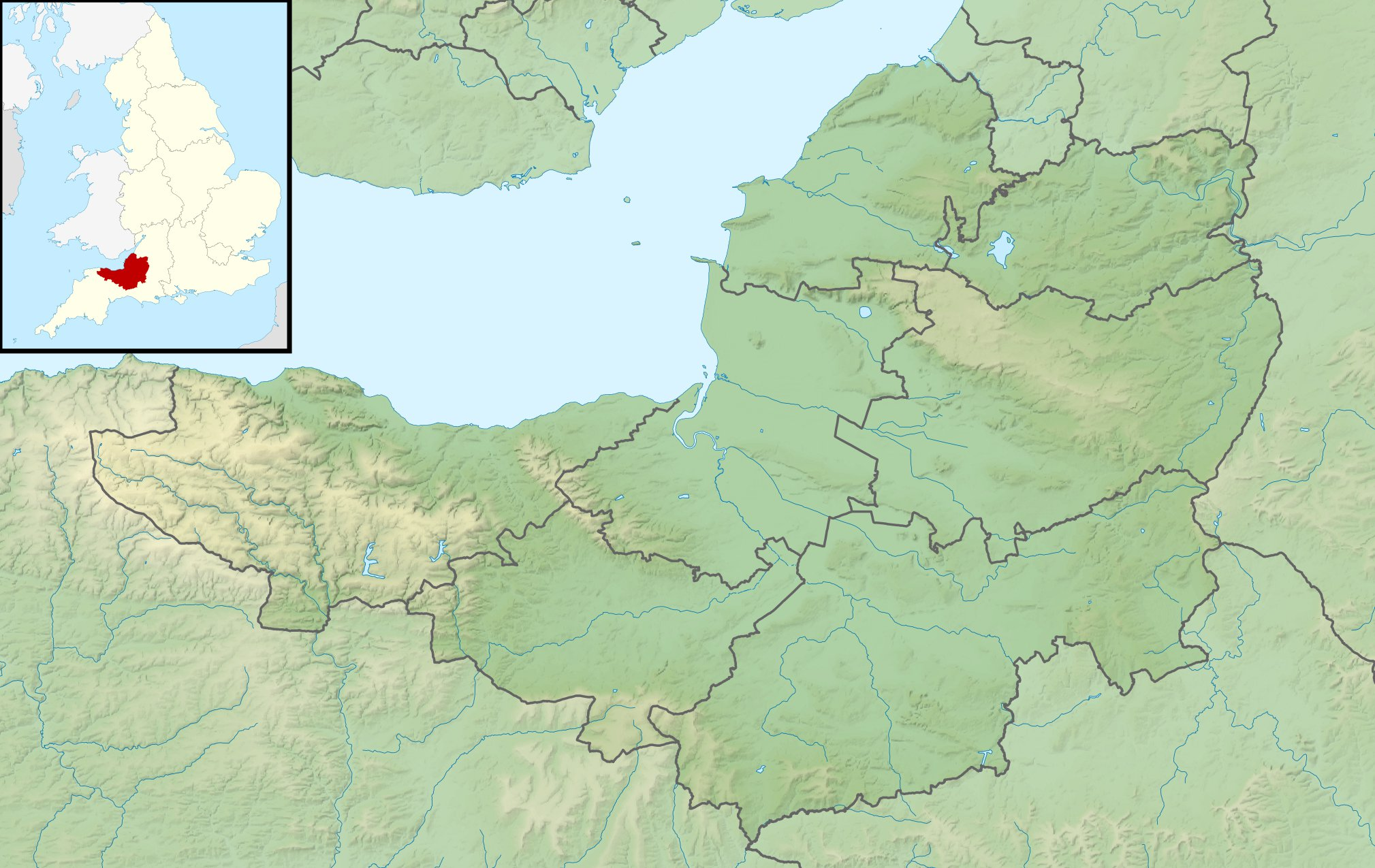
- Location within Somerset
- Location: Somerset
- Coordinates: 51.366°N 2.626°W
- Type: reservoir
- Primary inflows: Winford brook
- Primary outflows: Winford brook
- Basin countries: United Kingdom
- Surface area: 5 acres (2.0 ha)

Chew Magna Reservoir is a 5-acre (2 ha) reservoir on the western outskirts of the village of Chew Magna, Somerset, England. It lies just north of the B3130 Winford Road.

The reservoir was created by damming Winford brook in order to supply water for villages in the Chew Valley. It is owned and managed by Bristol Water.

Chew Magna reservoir provides fly fishing for stocked brown trout (Salmo trutta morpha fario) and rainbow trout (Oncorhynchus mykiss). Rainbows can be fished all year. Parking is close to the lake and there are many stagings erected around the lake.

In 2011 the reservoir emptied following a long period without sustained rainfall. Bristol Water rescued the trout and transferred them to the nearby Chew Valley Lake.

== Bibliography ==
- Janes, Rowland, ed. (1987). The Natural History of the Chew Valley. Biografix. ISBN 0-9545125-0-2.
