= Great Witcombe =

Village in Gloucestershire, England

Coordinates: 51.831353°N 2.1314284°W

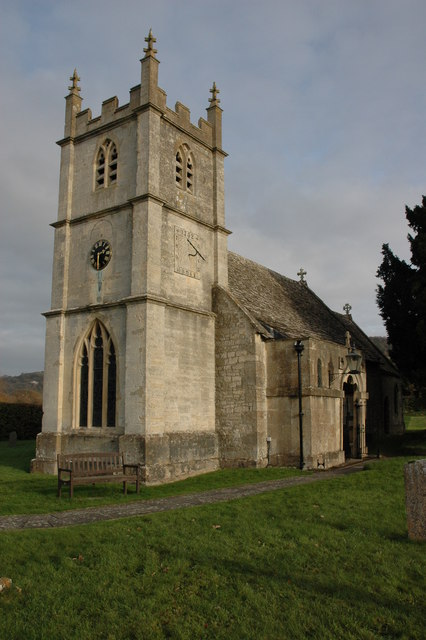

- Location within Gloucestershire
- Area: 6.07 km^{2} (2.34 sq mi)
- Population: 80 (2001 census)
  - Density: 13/km^{2} (34/sq mi)
- Civil parish: Great Witcombe
- District: Tewkesbury
- Shire county: Gloucestershire
- Region: South West
- Country: England
- Sovereign state: United Kingdom
- Police: Gloucestershire
- Fire: Gloucestershire
- Ambulance: South Western

Great Witcombe is a village and civil parish 5 miles (8 km) south east of Gloucester, in the Tewkesbury district, in the county of Gloucestershire, England. In 2001 the parish had a population of 80. The parish touches Badgeworth, Brimpsfield, Brockworth, Cowley and Cranham. Also was name Wit/ikonge.

== Landmarks ==
There are 17 listed buildings in Great Witcombe. Great Witcombe has a church called St Mary. The parish includes the remains of Great Witcombe Roman Villa.

== History ==
The name "Witcombe" means 'Wide valley'.
