= Chew Valley Lake =

Reservoir in Somerset, England

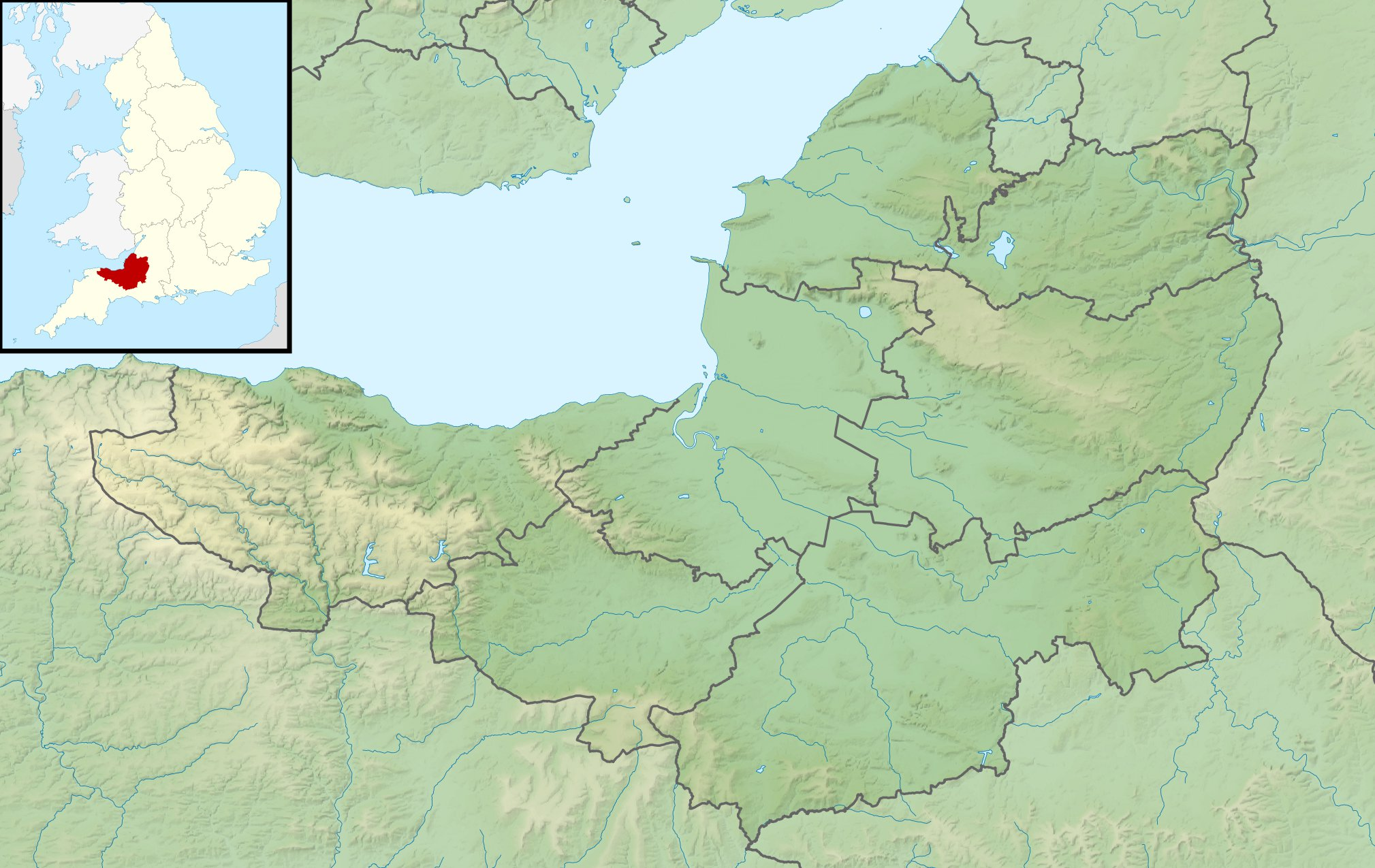
- Location within Somerset

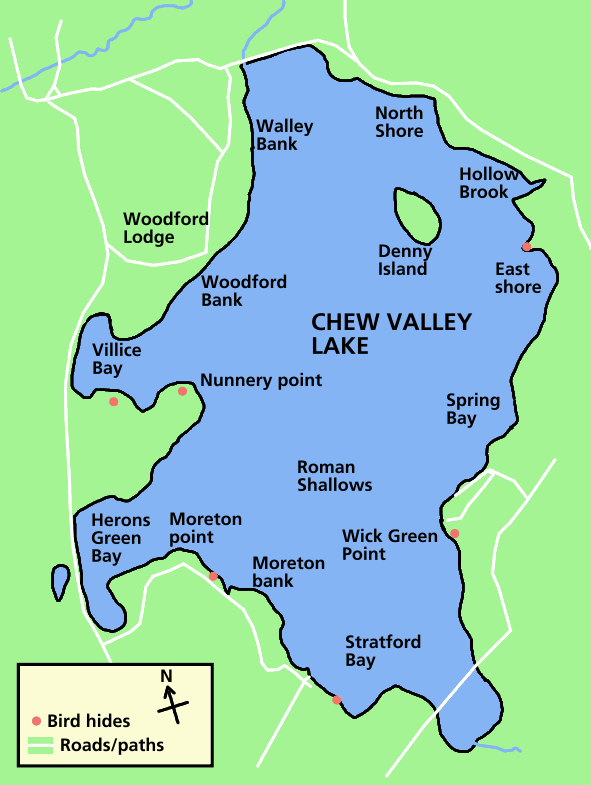
- Map
- Location: Somerset
- Coordinates: 51°20′4.92″N 2°37′4.92″W
- Lake type: Reservoir
- Primary inflows: River Chew
- Primary outflows: River Chew
- Catchment area: 14,000 acres (57 km^{2})
- Basin countries: United Kingdom
- Managing agency: Bristol Water
- Designation: SSSI 1001346; SPA UK9010041
- Surface area: 1,200 acres (4.9 km^{2})
- Average depth: 14 ft (4.3 m)
- Max. depth: 37 ft (11 m)
- Water volume: 4,500,000,000 imp gal (0.020 km^{3})
- Islands: Denny Island

Chew Valley Lake (grid reference ST5659) is a reservoir in Chew Stoke, Chew Valley, Somerset, England. It is the sixth-largest artificial lake by area in the United Kingdom, with an area of 1,200 acres (4.9 km^{2}), but only the forty-seventh largest by volume. The lake, created in the early 1950s, was opened by Queen Elizabeth II in 1956. It provides much of the drinking water for the city of Bristol and surrounding area, taking its supply from the Mendip Hills. Some of the lake water is used to maintain the flow in the River Chew.

Before the lake was created, archaeological investigations were carried out that showed evidence of occupation since Neolithic times and included Roman artefacts. The lake is an important site for wildlife and has been designated a Site of Special Scientific Interest (SSSI) and a Special Protection Area (SPA). It is a national centre for birdwatching, with over 260 species recorded. The lake has indigenous and migrant water birds throughout the year, and two nature trails have been created. The flora and fauna provide habitats for some less common plants and insects.

Some restricted use for recreational activities is permitted by the owner, Bristol Water, including dinghy sailing and fishing, primarily for trout.

== Location ==
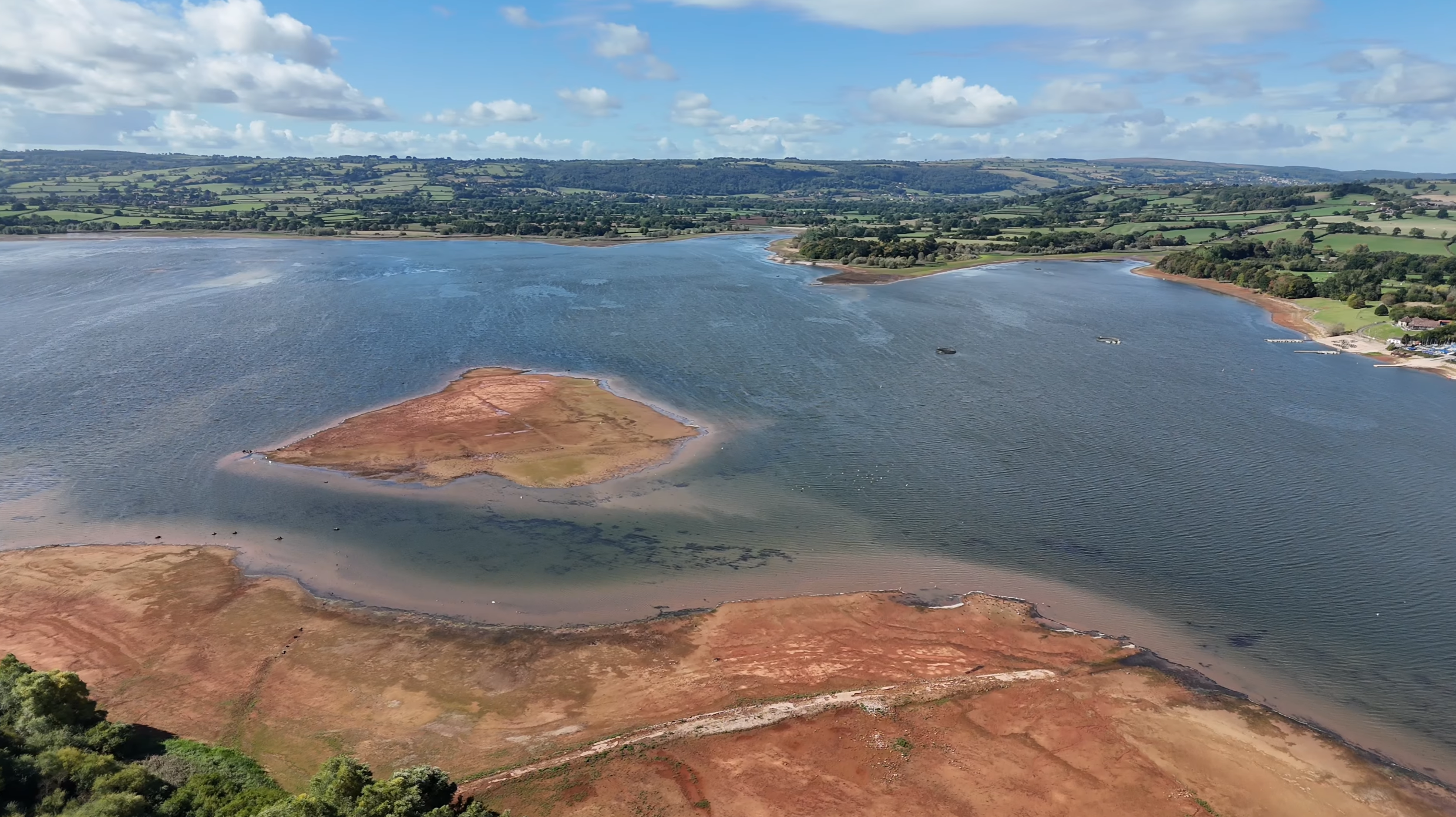
The lake in 2025 with Denny Island clearly visible

Chew Valley Lake is in the Chew Valley at the northern edge of the Mendip Hills, surrounded by meadows and woods and close to the villages of Chew Stoke, Chew Magna and Bishop Sutton. When it was built in the 1950s, its 1,200 acres (4.9 km^{2}) were flooded with 4,500 million imperial gallons (20,000,000 m^{3}) of water from the Mendip hills, with a catchment area of 14,000 acres (57 km^{2}). It is shallow, with an average depth of 14 ft (4 m) at top level and a maximum depth of just 37 ft (11 m). It is fed by small rivers, and it flows into the River Chew for 17 miles (27 km) before it joins the Avon to head out to sea. The deepest part is near the dam and the outlet tower, where the steeply sloping shores of Walley Bank and the north shore result in depths of up to 20 ft (6 m). Denny Island, above the surface throughout the year, provides a habitat for wildlife.

The lake is owned and operated by Bristol Water, which created it in 1956 when the demand became too large for nearby Blagdon Lake. Working with the Avon Wildlife Trust, Somerset Wildlife Trust and other environmental groups, Bristol Water has encouraged various species of birds and plants, and created a venue for visitors.

It has two landscaped picnic areas. Facilities include a tea shop, with indoor and outdoor seating areas with a view of the lake, and information centre. There are a souvenir shop and small art gallery and two nature trails. The Grebe Trail is a hard-surfaced, all-weather path suitable for pedestrians, pushchairs and wheelchairs and covers a circuit 0.75 miles (1.2 km) long, starting and finishing at the wooded picnic area. The Bittern Trail is reached from the Grebe Trail by the footbridge over Hollow Brook. The grassy path is often waterlogged in winter, but there is a boardwalk over a short section. The trail runs along the east shore, visits an open bird hide and returns to the footbridge, making a 1-mile (1.5-kilometre) circuit. Bristol Water imposes conditions on visitors, particularly related to the areas where dogs are allowed.

== Access and transportation ==
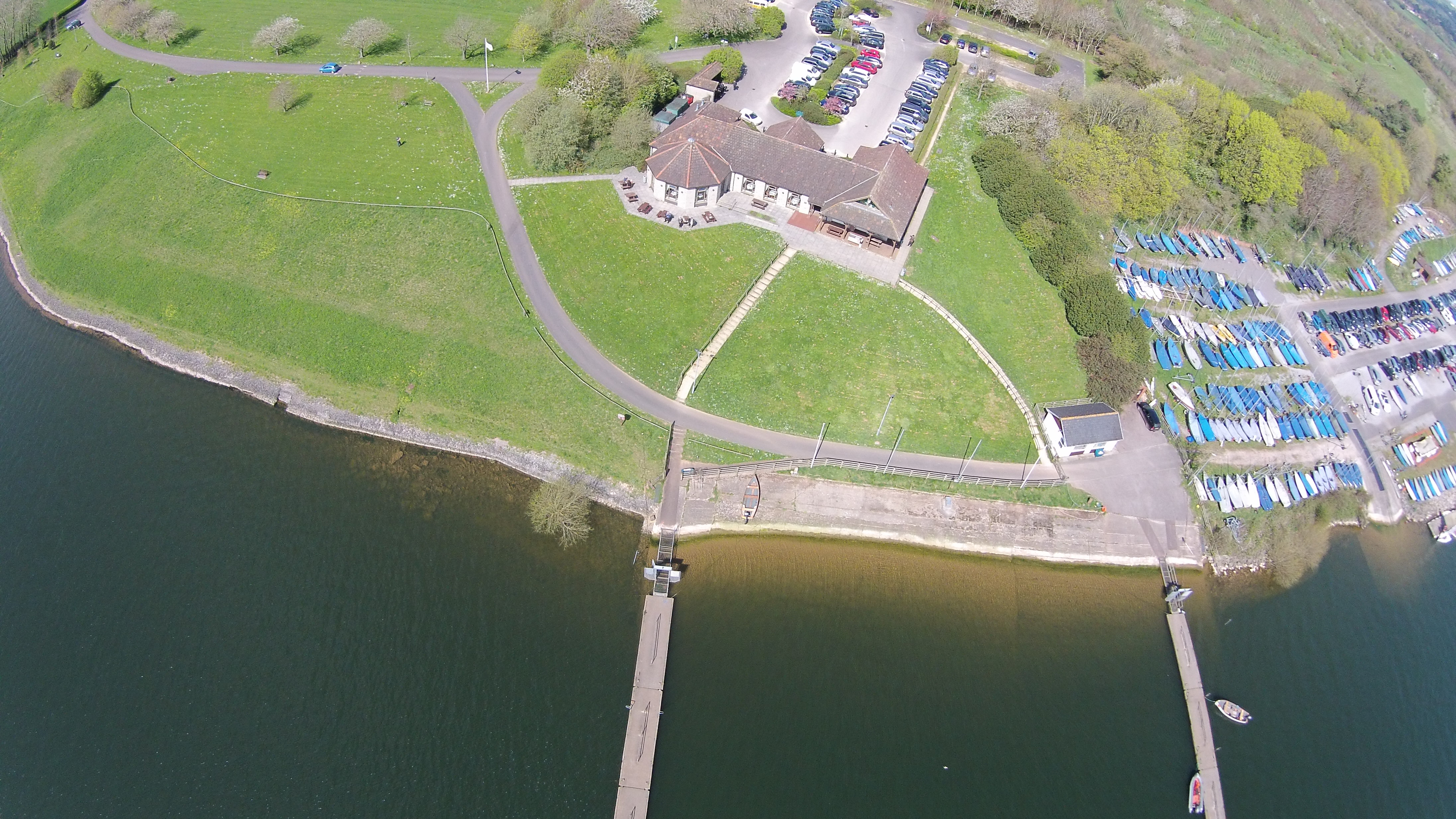
Woodford Lodge and part of the sailing club

Access to the waterside is restricted in places to reduce the disruption to wildlife. Paths around the lake are generally flat and, where paths are surfaced, wheelchair access is possible.

Visitors are officially invited to use public transport, but overwhelmingly arrive by private car, encouraged by the provision of parking spaces. The "Chew Valley Explorer" bus route 672/674 provides access.

In 2002 a 1.9-mile (3-kilometre) safe cycle route, the Chew Lake West Green Route, was opened along the B3114 on the western part of the lake. It forms part of the Padstow to Bristol West Country Way, National Cycle Network Route 3. It has all-weather surfacing, providing a smooth off-road facility for ramblers, mobility-challenged visitors and cyclists of all abilities. It was funded by Bath and North East Somerset Council with the support of Sustrans and the Chew Valley Recreational Trail Association. Minor roads around the lake are also frequently used by cyclists.

Bristol Airport is approximately 10 miles (15 km) away. The nearest major road is the A368, which runs along the southern edge of the lake and provides access from Bath and Weston super Mare. The A37 and A38 are slightly further away, providing access from Bristol. The lake is also easily accessible from the M5 motorway at junctions 18 and 22, with visitors instructed to follow signs to Bristol Airport. Car parking is available at the visitor centre and Woodford Lodge, for which a charge is made, and a small amount of parking is available at points around the lake; some of these are restricted to those with fishing permits.

== History ==
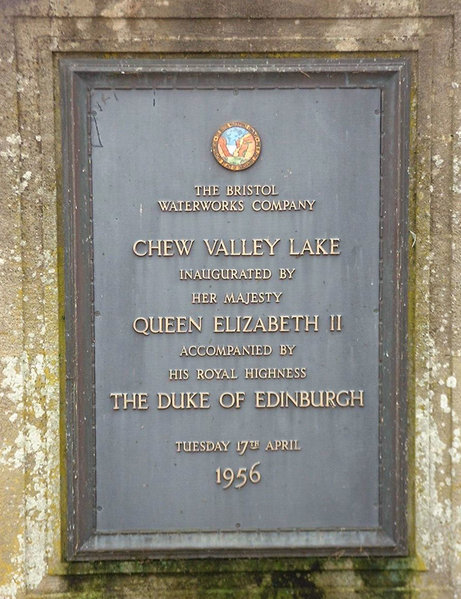
Plaque unveiled by Queen Elizabeth II in 1956

The area the lake covers was once rich farmland. Farms and houses had to be removed before the land was flooded, and old roads, hedgerows and tree stumps can reappear when dry summers cause the level of the lake to drop. Prior to the flooding of the reservoir, archaeological excavations were carried out by Philip Rahtz and Ernest Greenfield employed by the Ministry of Works, from 1953 to 1955. The excavations found evidence of people belonging to the consecutive periods known as Upper Palaeolithic, Mesolithic and Neolithic (Old, Middle and New Stone Age), Bronze Age and Iron Age, including implements such as stone knives, flint blades and the head of a mace, along with buildings and graves. The artefacts from this period are held at Bristol Museum & Art Gallery. Further evidence of Neolithic and Bronze Age occupation is provided by the archaeological survey of the Mendip Hills Area of Outstanding Natural Beauty.

Excavations have also uncovered Roman remains, indicating agricultural and industrial activity from the second half of the first century to third century AD. The finds included a villa at Chew Park where wooden writing tablets (the first in the UK) with ink writing were found. The tablets were sent to the British Museum, but other Roman material is on display at the Bristol City Museum and Art Gallery with the lake's other historical artefacts.

Further excavations around the village of Moreton, which has now been totally submerged, found evidence of a thriving community in medieval times and possibly the remains of the Nunnery of Santa Cruz. During the Middle Ages farming was the most important activity in the area covered by the lake, supported by four flour mills powered by the River Chew. Stratford Mill was demolished and re-erected in the grounds of Blaise Castle Museum, in north-west Bristol. The largest settlement was Moreton, which is listed in the Domesday Book of 1086, and survived until the flooding of the lake, when the remains of the Moreton Cross were moved to Chew Stoke Parish Church. There is evidence of lime kilns, which were used in the production of mortar for the construction of local churches. Farming, both arable and dairy, continued until the flooding of the lake, with most households also keeping pigs. There were orchards for fruit production, including apples, pears and plums. Moreton was also the site of a gunpowder mill in the 18th century.

=== Reservoir ===
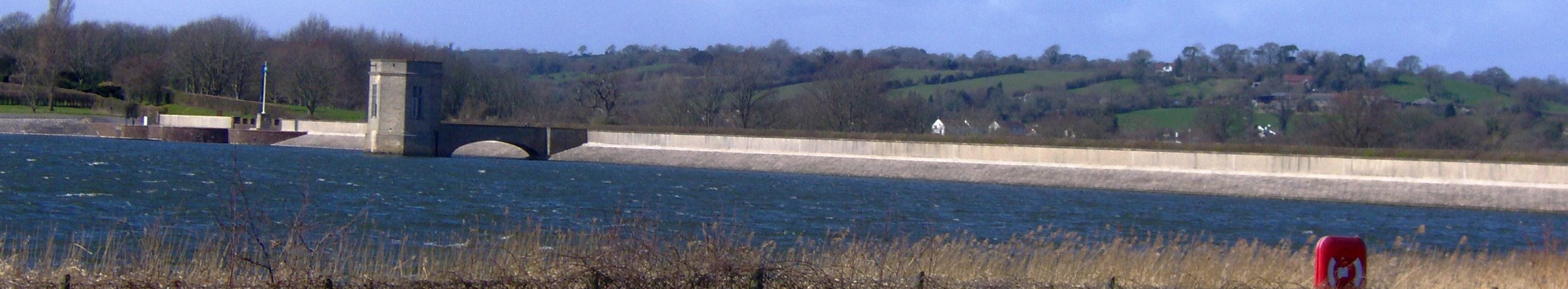
Chew Valley Lake dam and the outlet tower

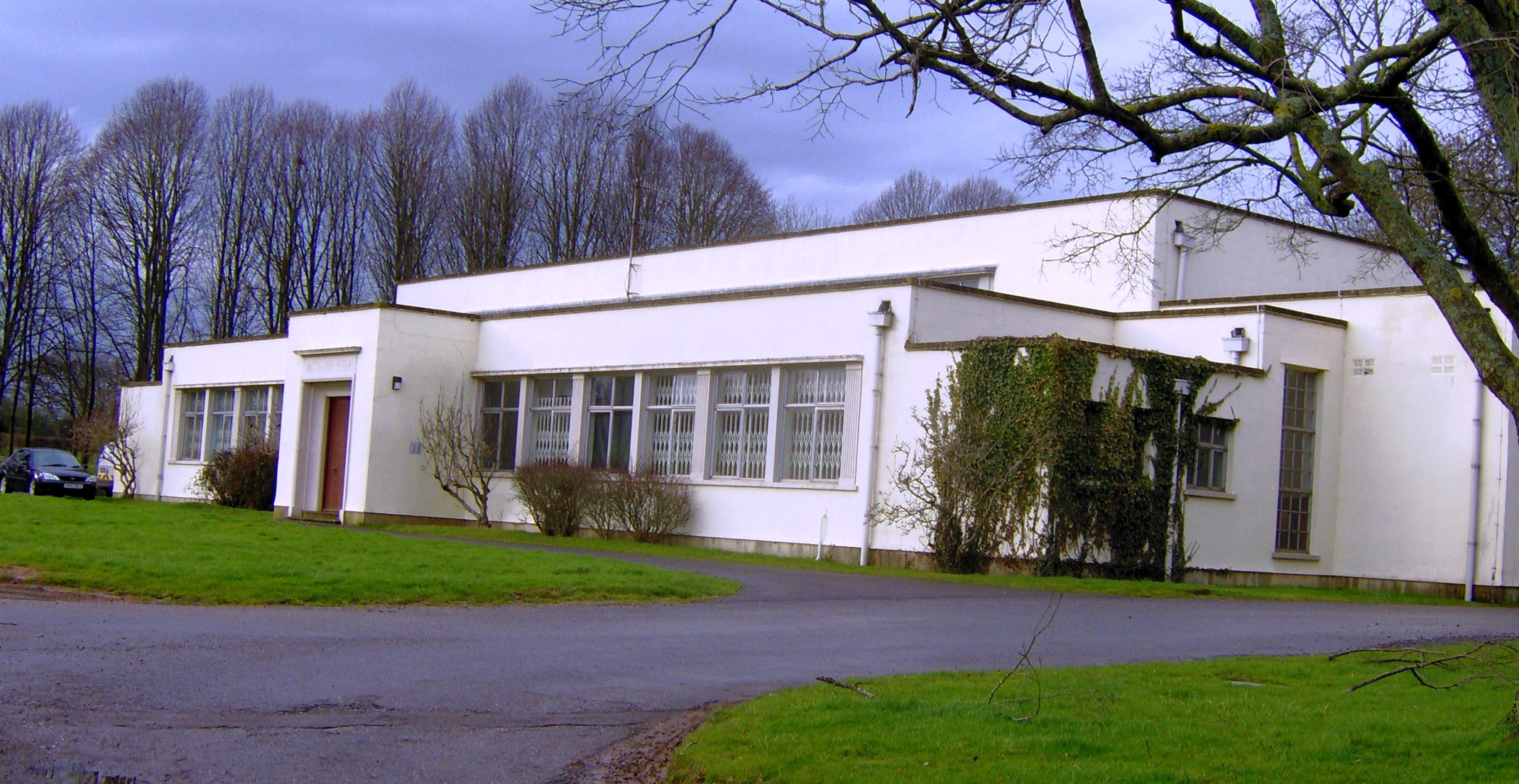
Pumping Station

Plans for the building of the reservoir were under discussion before the Second World War, and an act of parliament submitted by the Bristol Waterworks Company was passed in 1939. Following this, farms were bought by the company and farmed by the previous owners as tenancies. Farms and buildings still remaining in private hands were acquired by compulsory purchase. The sanction for construction was given in 1949 and the contract awarded to A.E. Farr, who employed 300 people on the site. The main dam was stabilised by injecting concrete into the cracks in the bedrock. The core of the dam was made of puddled clay mixed with sand. This was the first time the gain in strength brought about by the use of sand drains had been quantified. The lake was inaugurated by Queen Elizabeth II, accompanied by Prince Philip, with the unveiling of a commemorative stone and plaque, which can be seen from the dam, on 17 April 1956, although it was not full until 25 February 1958. Flowers were presented to the Queen at the opening of Chew Valley Lake by Judith Blair Brown, daughter of Kennedy Brown, who worked at Bristol Water Works at the time of construction of the lake.

During the storm of 10 July 1968, the lake gained an extra 471 million imperial gallons (2,140,000 m^{3}) and rose 19 inches (480 mm) in under 12 hours. At one point worried Bristol police issued a warning that the dam might not hold, prompting localised evacuation of populated valley areas downstream including Pensford and Keynsham.

== Ecology ==
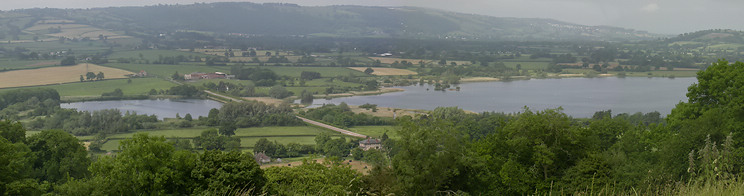
Herriot's Bridge

The lake is designated a Site of Special Scientific Interest (SSSI) and a Special Protection Area (SPA) (Site Code: UK9010041) largely because of the diversity of species and habitats. Providing further protection, much of the area around the lake also falls within the Mendip Hills Area of Outstanding Natural Beauty (AONB).

The lake appears to have a higher sedimentation rate than would be expected in other similar reservoirs, being in the region of 100–150 t.km^{−2}.yr^{−1}.

=== Geology ===
The main geological outcrops around the lake are mudstone, largely consisting of red siltstone resulting in the underlying characteristic of the gently rolling valley landscape. Bands of sandstone from the Triassic period contribute to the undulating character of the area. There are also more recent alluvial deposits beside the course of the River Chew.

=== Birds ===
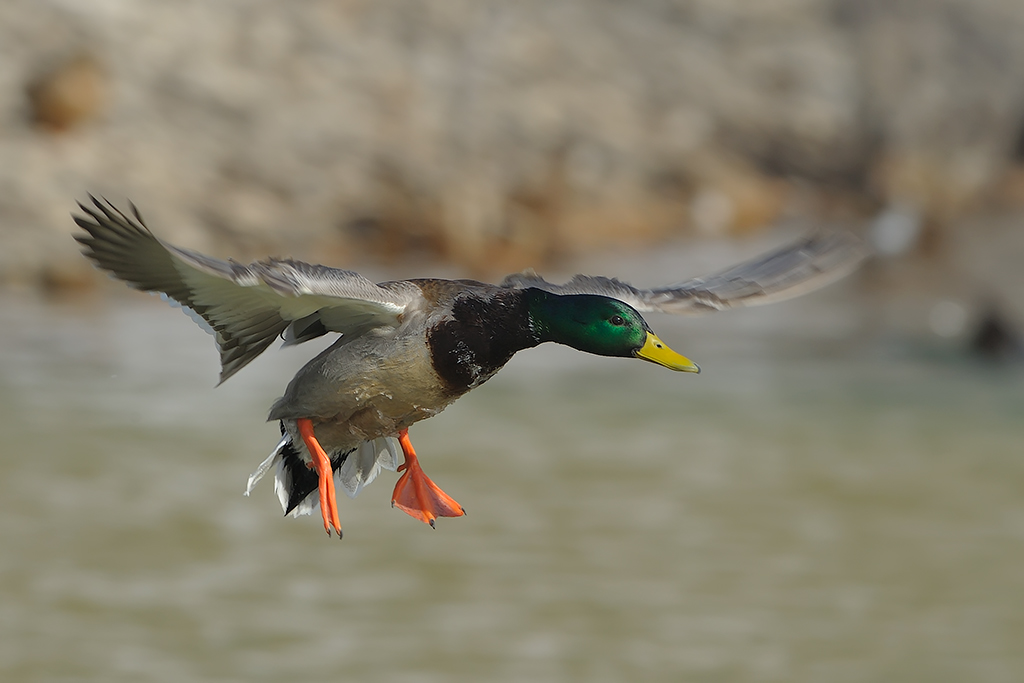
Drake mallard in flight on Chew Valley Lake

Over 270 species of birds have been recorded at Chew, an internationally important site for wintering and migrating wildfowl. From late July to February, up to 4,000 ducks (Anatidae) of twelve different species may be present, including internationally important numbers of northern shoveler (Anas clypeata) and gadwall (Anas strepera). Up to 600 great crested grebes (Podiceps cristatus) gather to moult on the lake in autumn. Data on bird species and their numbers on the lake, dating back to the first "ringing" in 1964, is available from the Chew Valley Ringing Station.

Numerous other birds can be seen, especially during the spring and autumn migration. Sand martins (Riparia riparia) arrive early and can usually be seen hawking over the water for insects in the second or third week of March. Flocks of tits (Paridae), swallows (Hirundinidae) and terns (Sternidae) can regularly be seen. Waders, such as lapwings (Vanellus vanellus), dunlin (Calidris alpina) and common snipe (Gallinago gallinago), are attracted to the muddy shores if the water level drops in autumn. By midwinter up to 55,000 gulls, mostly black-headed gull (Chroicocephalus ridibundus) and common gull (Larus canus), may be roosting. Good numbers of reed warblers (Acrocephalus scirpaceus) and sedge warblers (A. schoenobaenus) nest in the fringing reeds, along with grebes (Podicipedidae) and Eurasian coots (Fulica atra).

Much of the management work carried out in the nature reserve is aimed at encouraging ducks to breed, and small numbers of tufted duck (Aythya fuligula), common pochard (Aythya ferina), common shelduck (Tadorna tadorna) and gadwall raise broods most years. Recent breeding successes also include water rail (Rallus aquaticus) and Cetti's warbler (Cettia cetti).

A wetland reserve has been created at Heron's Green Pool on the opposite side of the causeway to the lake. A shallow pool fringed with sedges (Cyperaceae), rushes (Juncaceae) and reedgrasses (Calamagrostis) and surrounded by lightly grazed, rough grassland may also prove attractive to snipe and lapwings.

=== Fish ===
In late summer large shoals of roach (Rutilus rutilus) and perch (Perca fluviatilis) fry congregate around the margins and weed beds, which are predated by the brown trout (Salmo trutta morpha fario) and rainbow trout (Oncorhynchus mykiss). Chew Valley also holds a large population of pike (Esox lucius), and fishing for these is permitted at certain times of the year. Chew Valley currently holds the UK record at 47lb 5oz.

=== Insects ===
Aquatic midges (Chironomidae) provide the highest proportion of the fly life of the lake. The trout (Salmonidae) will feed at the surface on these and water boatmen (Corixidae), and below the surface on the caddisfly (Trichoptera) larvae and pupae; they will also take the adult caddisflies when they emerge. Other aquatic fauna including daphnia and snails are also found in the lake. Large populations of dragonflies, including migrant hawker (Aeshna mixta) and significant numbers of ruddy darter (Sympetrum sanguineum), occur at the lake. Eleven species of wainscot moth make their home in the reed beds, including the nationally local brown-veined wainscot (Archanara dissoluta), twin-spotted wainscot (Archanara geminipuncta) and silky wainscot (Chilodes maritimus).

=== Vegetation ===
The lake is surrounded with fringing reedbeds, carr woodland and grassland, which are managed by Bristol Water. The water conditions are eutrophic with run off from local fields and streams. Open-water plant communities are rather sparse, largely comprising fennel pondweed (Potamogeton pectinatus), lesser pondweed (Potamogeton pusillus), opposite-leaved pondweed (Groenlandia densa) and water-crowfoot (Ranunculus spp.). On neutral soils around the reservoir, pepper-saxifrage (Silaum silaus), burnet-saxifrage (Pimpinella saxifraga) and devil's-bit scabious (Succisa pratensis) occur, and on calcareous soils fairy flax (Linum catharticum), dwarf thistle (Cirsium acaule) and salad burnet (Sanguisorba minor subspecies minor) are found.

The small and medium-sized fields around the lake are generally bounded by hedges and occasionally by tree belts and woodland, some of which date back to the most evident period of enclosure of earlier open fields which took place in the late medieval period. Mature oak (Quercus) and ash (Fraxinus excelsior) trees are characteristic of the area with occasional groups of Scots pine (Pinus sylvestris) and chestnuts (Castanea sativa). Many elm (Ulmus) trees have been lost in this area, and dead/dying elms are also evident in the surrounding landscape.

Four areas of woodland containing 157 trees has been planted by The Life for a Life Charity around the lake on the Restaurant side, for the cremated remains of loved ones to be placed beneath them. These forests contain Scots pine (Pinus sylvestris), English oak (Quercus robur), rowan (Sorbus aucuparia) and the silver birch (Betula pendula).

== Leisure use ==
The lake is used for a wide variety of leisure pursuits.

=== Birdwatching ===
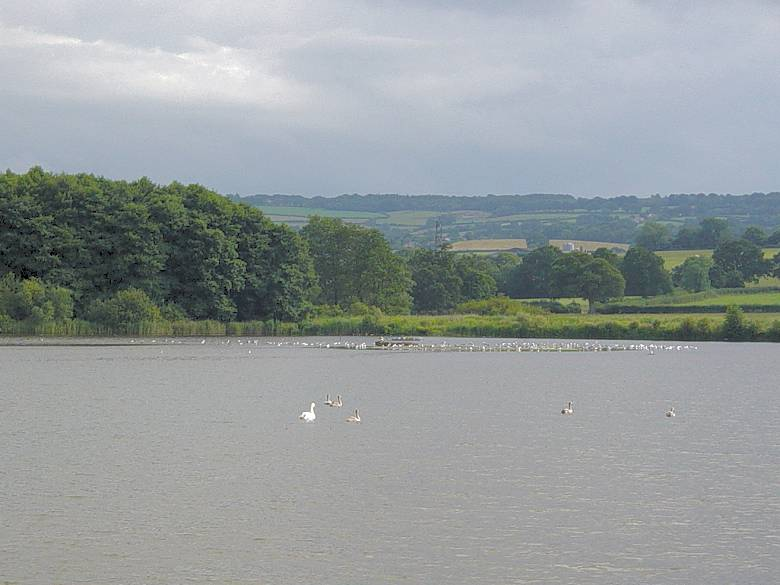
Birds on Chew Valley Lake taken from Herriott's Bridge

During 2005–2006 Bristol Water started restoring two artificial islands. These are intended to provide safe nesting and roosting sites for a range of wildfowl. Permits to enter the reservoir enclosure and to use the access roads, paths and bird hides are available (for a fee) only to members of ornithological and naturalist societies recognised by Bristol Water. They can be obtained from Woodford Lodge and include conditions of use imposed by the owners.

=== Sailing ===
Boats sailing on the lake

Chew Valley Lake Sailing Club has a sailing area, approximately 1.9 miles (3 km) long, for dinghy sailing. The lake is divided into two areas: a restricted summer area which is available during the fishing season (mid-March to mid-October), and the full area which can be used throughout the winter and on Sunday afternoons. The sailing area is marked out by lines of small white buoys. Racing marks are red buoys with flags, although large inflatable marks are used of open events.

The club can cater for fleets of over one hundred boats and it hosts large national events. Normal club racing has fleet starts for the following dinghy classes: Flying Fifteen (keelboat), Laser (dinghy), Solo (dinghy) and Topper (dinghy) as well as a handicap fleet run under the Portsmouth yardstick scheme. Five slipways enable easy launching. Off the water, the clubhouse facilities include large changing rooms, hot showers, hot food at the weekends, a bar and terrace overlooking the lake. The club caters for disabled people with facilities on both floors and a lift. Royal Yachting Association sailing courses are held at the club for members including race training, youth training, powerboat training, race officer training as well as more informal training run within each fleet.

=== Fishing ===
Bristol water control fishing in the lake requiring permits and restricting the areas which can be used. Motor boats can also be booked for fishing.

== Bibliography ==
- Durham, I. & M. (1991). Chew Magna and the Chew Valley in old photographs. Redcliffe Press. ISBN 978-1-872971-61-2.
- Janes, Rowland, ed. (1987). The Natural History of the Chew Valley. Biografix. ISBN 0-9545125-2-9.
- Rahtz, Phillip A.; Greenfield, Ernest (1978). Excavations at Chew Valley Lake, Somerset. Department of the Environment (successor to the Ministry of Works) The Stationery Office Books. ISBN 0-11-670560-4.

== See also ==
- Chew Magna Reservoir – Reservoir in Somerset, England
