= 1987 Wansdyke District Council election =

1987 UK local government election

← 1983	7 May 1987	1991 →

All 47 seats to Wansdyke District Council 24 seats needed for a majority
	First party	Second party	Third party
	Con	Lab	Ind
Party	Conservative	Labour	Independent
Last election	33 seats, 49.2%	11 seats, 34.1%	3 seats, 5.7%
Seats won	28	16	3
Seat change	▼5	▲5	Steady
Popular vote	21,279	18,632	2,383
Percentage	41.2%	36.1%	4.6%
Swing	▼8.0%	▲2.0%	▼1.1%
- Map showing the composition of Wansdyke District Council following the election. Blue showing Conservative, Red showing Labour and Grey showing Independents. Striped wards have mixed representation.
Council control before election
Conservative
Council control after election
Conservative

The 1987 Wansdyke Council election was held on Thursday 7 May 1987 to elect councillors to Wansdyke District Council in England. It took place on the same day as other district council elections in the United Kingdom.

The 1987 election saw the Conservatives win the largest number of seats and maintain majority control.

== Election results ==
Wansdyke District Council election, 1987
Party	Candidates						Votes		
Party	Stood	Elected	Gained	Unseated	Net	% of total	%	No.	Net %
Conservative	41	28	2	7	▼5	59.6%	41.2%	21,279	▼8%
Labour	32	16	6	1	▲5	34%	36.1%	18,632	▲2%
Independent	7	3	2	2	Steady	4.3%	4.6%	2,383	▼1.1%
Alliance	21	0	0	0	Steady	0%	16.1%	8,330	▲5.3%
Ind. Conservative	1	0	0	0	Steady	0%	2.0%	1,007	N/A

== Ward results ==
The ward results listed below are based on the changes from the 1983 elections, not taking into account any party defections or by-elections. Sitting councillors are marked with an asterisk (*).

=== Bathampton ===
Bathampton
Party	Candidate	Votes	%	±%
Conservative	K. Spinks	467	64.7	N/A
Alliance	M. Christie	255	35.3	N/A
Majority		212	29.4	N/A
Turnout			52.2	N/A
Registered electors		1,384		
Conservative hold				

=== Batheaston ===
Batheaston (2 seats)
Party	Candidate	Votes	%	±%
Conservative	G. Batt	619	51.7	–10.0
Conservative	W. Cox	551	–	
Alliance	R. Hidalgo	373	31.1	–7.2
Alliance	S. Hunt	356	–	
Labour	W. Tugwell	206	17.2	N/A
Turnout			52.7	+7.1
Registered electors		2,273		
Conservative hold		Swing		
Conservative hold		Swing		

=== Bathford ===
Bathford
Party	Candidate	Votes	%	±%
Conservative	K. Akin-Flenley *	518	69.7	–6.7
Alliance	J. Davies	225	30.3	N/A
Majority		293	39.4	–13.3
Turnout			51.8	+4.2
Registered electors		1,433		
Conservative hold		Swing		

=== Cameley ===
Cameley
Party	Candidate	Votes	%	±%
Conservative	T. Deacon	491	62.5	+4.8
Labour	W. Martin	294	37.5	N/A
Majority		197	25.1	+9.8
Turnout			52.2	–3.7
Registered electors		1,503		
Conservative hold		Swing		

=== Camerton ===
Camerton
Party	Candidate	Votes	%	±%
Independent	L. Bedborough *	369	62.1	N/A
Alliance	M. Orrom	116	19.5	N/A
Labour	B. Maynard	109	18.4	–18.1
Majority		253	42.6	N/A
Turnout			48.5	–10.0
Registered electors		1,224		
Independent gain from Conservative		Swing		

=== Charlcombe ===
Charlcombe
Party	Candidate	Votes	%	±%
Conservative	R. Bentley *	256	62.0	N/A
Alliance	W. Dobson-Smythe	157	38.0	N/A
Majority		99	24.0	N/A
Turnout			51.9	N/A
Registered electors		796		
Conservative hold				

=== Chew Magna ===
Chew Magna
Party	Candidate	Votes	%	±%
Conservative	N. Reed *	unopposed	N/A	N/A
Registered electors		1,162		
Conservative gain from Independent				

=== Chew Stoke ===
Chew Stoke
Party	Candidate	Votes	%	±%
Conservative	R. Powell *	unopposed	N/A	N/A
Registered electors		810		
Conservative hold				

=== Clutton ===
Clutton
Party	Candidate	Votes	%	±%
Conservative	D. Miles	399	60.3	–5.3
Labour	L. Carruthers	263	39.7	+5.3
Majority		136	20.6	–10.6
Turnout			54.8	–2.1
Registered electors		1,207		
Conservative hold		Swing		

=== Compton Dando ===
Compton Dando
Party	Candidate	Votes	%	±%
Conservative	J. Kett-White *	unopposed	N/A	N/A
Registered electors		1,312		
Conservative hold				

=== Farmborough ===
Farmborough
Party	Candidate	Votes	%	±%
Conservative	C. Hix *	unopposed	N/A	N/A
Registered electors		894		
Conservative hold				

=== Freshford ===
Freshford
Party	Candidate	Votes	%	±%
Conservative	C. Langridge	471	62.2	+2.7
Alliance	E. Flower	192	25.4	N/A
Labour	R. Birchby	94	12.4	–28.1
Majority		279	36.9	+17.9
Turnout			62.3	+3.7
Registered electors		1,216		
Conservative hold		Swing		

=== Hartprees ===
Hartprees
Party	Candidate	Votes	%	±%
Conservative	H. Taviner *	unopposed	N/A	N/A
Registered electors		1,168		
Conservative hold				

=== High Littleton ===
High Littleton
Party	Candidate	Votes	%	±%
Independent	J. Hotter *	unopposed	N/A	N/A
Registered electors		1,405		
Independent hold				

=== Hinton Charterhouse ===
Hinton Charterhouse
Party	Candidate	Votes	%	±%
Conservative	B. Cowley	330	45.7	–13.6
Alliance	M. Flower	307	42.5	+15.7
Labour	J. Pitt	85	11.8	–1.8
Majority		23	3.2	–29.5
Turnout			56.9	+1.3
Registered electors		1,269		
Conservative hold		Swing		

=== Keynsham East ===
Keynsham East (3 seats)
Party	Candidate	Votes	%	±%
Conservative	L. Sell *	1,480	52.1	–2.2
Conservative	J. Neville-Dove *	1,460	–	
Conservative	M. Horler	1,326	–	
Alliance	D. Hounsell	1,006	35.4	+5.3
Labour	R. Lock	356	12.5	–3.1
Labour	V. Burton	332	–	
Turnout			65.5	
Registered electors		4,342		
Conservative hold		Swing		
Conservative hold		Swing		
Conservative hold		Swing		

=== Keynsham North ===
Keynsham North (2 seats)
Party	Candidate	Votes	%	±%
Conservative	M. Pope *	656	41.4	–24.4
Conservative	B. Organ	647	–	
Independent	T. Evans	529	33.4	N/A
Labour	C. Davis	399	25.2	–7.0
Labour	P. Knight	386	–	
Turnout			56.7	
Registered electors		2,792		
Conservative hold		Swing		
Conservative hold		Swing		

=== Keynsham South ===
Keynsham South (3 seats)
Party	Candidate	Votes	%	±%
Labour	J. Lingard	858	40.4	+3.2
Conservative	R. Beech	648	30.5	–13.5
Labour	S. Bateman	639	–	
Conservative	A. Paddon	618	–	
Alliance	A. Connett	616	29.0	+10.2
Labour	F. Mardles	614	–	
Conservative	B. Hutchinson *	607	–	
Alliance	C. Brook	538	–	
Turnout			62.9	
Registered electors		3,373		
Labour gain from Conservative		Swing		
Conservative hold		Swing		
Labour gain from Conservative		Swing		

=== Keynsham West ===
Keynsham West (2 seats)
Party	Candidate	Votes	%	±%
Labour	K. Bye	583	50.9	+7.1
Conservative	E. Bryant	563	49.1	–7.1
Conservative	G. Wood *	549	–	
Labour	G. Derrick	529	–	
Turnout			48.8	
Registered electors		2,346		
Labour gain from Conservative		Swing		
Conservative hold		Swing		

=== Midsomer Norton North ===
Midsomer Norton North (2 seats)
Party	Candidate	Votes	%	±%
Labour	D. Short *	662	39.8	–5.6
Conservative	S. Steel	579	34.8	–0.6
Labour	E. Turnbull	531	–	
Conservative	T. Towler	526	–	
Alliance	D. Rendell	421	25.3	+5.9
Alliance	P. Vass	411	–	
Turnout			38.9	
Registered electors		2,398		
Labour hold		Swing		
Conservative gain from Labour		Swing		

=== Midsomer Norton Redfield ===
Midsomer Norton Redfield (2 seats)
Party	Candidate	Votes	%	±%
Labour	B. Perry *	775	40.5	+10.2
Conservative	K. Curtis *	738	38.6	–1.4
Conservative	J. Blatchford	608	–	
Labour	R. Wilkinson	539	–	
Alliance	M. Elford	400	20.9	+2.9
Alliance	W. Elford	315	–	
Turnout			46.7	
Registered electors		4,098		
Labour gain from Conservative		Swing		
Conservative hold		Swing		

=== Newton St Loe ===
Newton St Loe
Party	Candidate	Votes	%	±%
Conservative	R. Gay *	unopposed	N/A	N/A
Registered electors		1,353		
Conservative hold				

=== Paulton ===
Paulton (3 seats)
Party	Candidate	Votes	%	±%
Labour	V. Badman *	732	33.3	–12.5
Labour	D. Hamblin *	705	–	
Labour	J. Hamblin	593	–	
Ind. Conservative	K. Ashman	505	23.0	N/A
Independent	A. Rivers	502	22.9	N/A
Alliance	K. Ellis	456	20.8	–3.0
Turnout			61.1	
Registered electors		3,591		
Labour hold		Swing		
Labour hold		Swing		
Labour hold		Swing		

=== Peasedown St John ===
Peasedown St John (2 seats)
Party	Candidate	Votes	%	±%
Labour	E. Latchem *	641	47.4	–18.8
Labour	A. Riddick *	549	–	
Independent	N. Bowles	495	36.6	N/A
Conservative	J. Mansbridge	217	16.0	–17.8
Conservative	B. Tanner	205	–	
Turnout			50.3	
Registered electors		2,688		
Labour hold		Swing		
Labour hold		Swing		

=== Publow ===
Publow
Party	Candidate	Votes	%	±%
Conservative	A. Webb *	unopposed	N/A	N/A
Registered electors		1,445		
Conservative hold				

=== Radstock ===
Radstock (3 seats)
Party	Candidate	Votes	%	±%
Labour	P. Gay *	1,282	45.6	+4.6
Labour	B. Shearn	945	–	
Labour	W. Reakes	916	–	
Independent	M. Whittock *	705	25.1	–1.9
Alliance	R. Inchley	463	16.5	–2.7
Conservative	E. Clement	364	12.9	+0.1
Alliance	G. Roach	332	–	
Conservative	K. Overmont	311	–	
Turnout			85.8	
Registered electors		3,280		
Labour hold		Swing		
Labour hold		Swing		
Labour gain from Independent		Swing		

=== Saltford ===
Saltford (2 seats)
Party	Candidate	Votes	%	±%
Conservative	D. Mawer	1,315	79.6	–1.2
Conservative	D. Rudderham *	1,298	–	
Labour	R. Griffiths	336	20.4	–1.2
Turnout			47.3	
Registered electors		3,491		
Conservative hold		Swing		
Conservative hold		Swing		

=== Stowey Sutton ===
Stowey Sutton
Party	Candidate	Votes	%	±%
Independent	V. Pritchard	285	53.3	N/A
Conservative	J. Knibbs *	250	46.7	–4.3
Majority		35	6.6	
Turnout			58.4	
Registered electors		916		
Independent gain from Conservative		Swing		

=== Timsbury ===
Timsbury
Party	Candidate	Votes	%	±%
Conservative	M. Offer *	595	50.5	–6.4
Labour	A. Moon	584	49.5	+6.4
Majority		11	1.0	
Turnout			61.4	
Registered electors		1,919		
Conservative hold		Swing		

=== Westfield ===
Westfield (3 seats)
Party	Candidate	Votes	%	±%
Labour	T. Huyton	1,071	49.8	+8.3
Labour	D. Chalk	1,064	–	
Labour	C. Jones *	960	–	
Conservative	J. Haxell	563	26.2	–10.4
Conservative	L. King	543	–	
Alliance	D. Jones	517	24.0	–2.1
Conservative	K. Toghill	511	–	
Alliance	D. Stratford	443	–	
Alliance	F. Apfelstedt	431	–	
Turnout			58.4	
Registered electors		3,682		
Labour hold		Swing		
Labour hold		Swing		
Labour gain from Conservative		Swing		
