= Wansdyke District Council elections =

Local government elections in Avon, England

Wansdyke was a non-metropolitan district in Avon, England. It was abolished on 1 April 1996 and replaced by Bath and North East Somerset.

== Political control ==
From the first election to the council in 1973 until its abolition in 1996, political control of the council was held by the following parties:

Party in control	Years
No overall control	1973–1976
Conservative	1976–1991
No overall control	1991–1996

== Council elections ==
- 1973 Wansdyke District Council election
- 1976 Wansdyke District Council election (New ward boundaries)
- 1979 Wansdyke District Council election
- 1983 Wansdyke District Council election
- 1987 Wansdyke District Council election (District boundary changes took place but the number of seats remained the same)
- 1991 Wansdyke District Council election (District boundary changes took place but the number of seats remained the same)

== District result maps ==
1976 results map

1979 results map

1983 results map

1987 results map

1991 results map
