= Henry Strachey =

Henry Strachey may refer to:

- Henry Strachey (artist) (1863–1940), English painter and art critic
- Henry Strachey (explorer) (1816–1912), British explorer and army officer
- Sir Henry Strachey, 1st Baronet (1736–1810), British politician
- Sir Henry Strachey, 2nd Baronet (1772–1858), son of the above, of Sutton Court
