= Edward Strachey =

Edward Strachey may refer to:

- Edward Strachey, 1st Baron Strachie (1858–1936), British Liberal politician
- Sir Edward Strachey, 3rd Baronet (1812–1901), English man of letters
