= Bishop Sutton =

Village in Somerset, England

Coordinates: 51.3348°N 2.5921°W

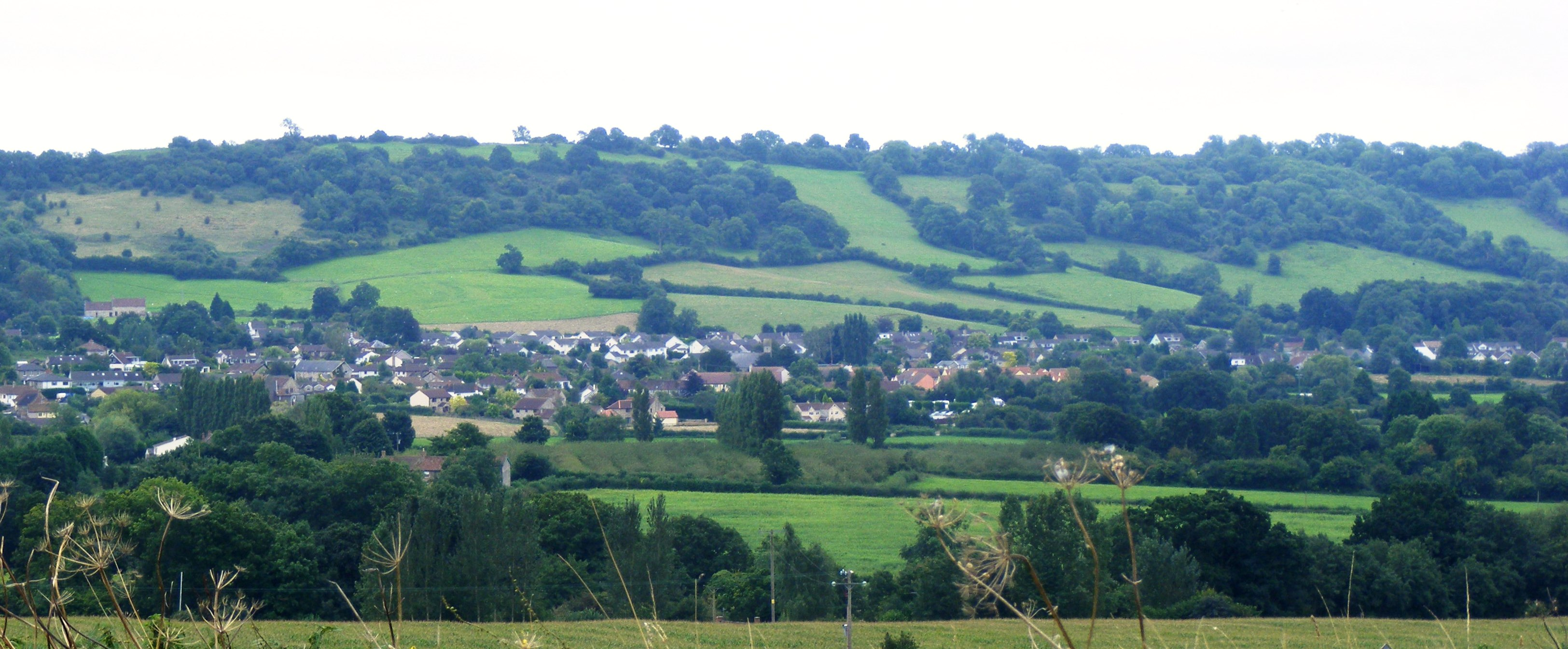
- A view of Bishop Sutton from Knowle Hill

- Location within Somerset
- OS grid reference: ST587597
- Civil parish: Stowey-Sutton
- Unitary authority: Bath and North East Somerset
- Ceremonial county: Somerset
- Region: South West
- Country: England
- Sovereign state: United Kingdom
- Post town: Bristol
- Postcode district: BS39
- Dialling code: 01275
- Police: Avon and Somerset
- Fire: Avon
- Ambulance: South Western
- UK Parliament: North East Somerset and Hanham

Bishop Sutton is a village on the northern slopes of the Mendip Hills, within the affluent Chew Valley in Somerset, England. It lies east of Chew Valley Lake and north east of the Mendip Hills, approximately 10 miles (16 km) south of Bristol on the A368, Weston-super-Mare to Bath road. Bishop Sutton and the neighbouring village of Stowey form the civil parish of Stowey-Sutton.

The village has a large village hall, a public house (The Red Lion), an organic culinary school and bed and breakfast (Meadow View), a small supermarket, several shops including a post office within the village store, a tennis club and a caravan park. Next to the village hall are sports pitches where Bishop Sutton F.C. play.

The main industry in the village was a coal mine owned by J. Lovell & Sons from 1835 to 1929, which was part of the Somerset coalfield. There was also a large flour mill, part of which was converted into flats.

== History ==
=== Coal mining ===
Much of the exploratory survey work which identified the geology of the area was carried out by William Smith, who became known as the "father of English geology", building on earlier work in the same area by John Strachey, who lived at Sutton Court.

The Pensford coal basin lies in the northern area of the Somerset coalfield around Bishop Sutton, Pensford, Stanton Drew, Farmborough and Hunstrete.

The date for the first pits around Bishop Sutton are uncertain but there was at least one before 1719. By 1824 a collection of four bell pits were identified in field tithe No 1409, and four shaft pits in field tithe No 1428, but they were no longer working.

The Old Pit (ST587597), which was also known as Sutton Top Pit or Upper Sutton Pit, was dug before 1799 and owned by Henry Fisher, who sold it in 1821 to Robert Blinman Dowling and several seams of coal were identified and exploited. After Dowling's death the Old Pit was sold to T.T. Hawkes in 1852, but he defaulted on the payments and it was sold in 1853 to William Rees-Mogg (an ancestor of William Rees-Mogg) and his associates. The shaft reached a depth of 304 feet (93 m), but went out of production by 1855, when the "New" Pit which had been sunk in the early 19th century but then closed, was reopened and deepened to exploit deeper seams. The New Pit (ST587597) had two shafts of 4 feet (1.2 m) diameter, one for winding and one for pumping. In 1896 it was owned by F. Spencer, New Rock Colliery, and in 1908 by Jesse Lovell and Sons. The pit finally closed in 1929.

== Government and politics ==
Bishop Sutton, along with Stowey, makes up the Stowey Sutton parish council, which has some responsibility for local issues.

The parish is in the unitary authority of Bath and North East Somerset. For elections to Bath and North East Somerset Council, the parish is in Chew Valley South electoral division. Bishop Sutton is the most populous area of the division, which stretches north and west to Nempnett Thrubwell. The total population of the division at the 2011 census was 2,377.

From 1894 to 1974, the parish was part of Clutton Rural District. It was then in the Wansdyke District of the county of Avon until 1996, when the unitary Bath and North East Somerset was created.

The parish is represented in the House of Commons of the Parliament of the United Kingdom as part of North East Somerset and Hanham.

Emergency services are provided by the Avon Fire and Rescue Service, Avon and Somerset Police and the Great Western Ambulance Service.

== Geography ==
=== Folly Farm ===
Folly Farm is a traditionally managed visitable farm and nature reserve run by the Avon Wildlife Trust. The farm house is 17th century and the surrounding land includes neutral grassland, flowery meadows and woodlands with splendid views. Much of Folly Farm is designated as a biological Site of Special Scientific Interest. The SSSI comprises two adjacent areas, the meadows (19.36 hectares) and Dowlings Wood (9 hectares). The site is situated on a curved ridge of land on neutral soils derived from the underlying Keuper Marl. The soil is of the Icknield Association with dark brown, moist but moderately well-drained clay. It attracts a wide range of birds. The pasture is of a kind now rare in the area. A number of scarce species of fly are listed from the site.

The site was purchased from the Strachey family who were lords of the manor of the nearby Sutton Court in 1987.

=== Burledge Hill ===
Burledge Hill is on the southern edge of the village of Bishop Sutton. The site comprises a mixture of flower rich grassland, scrub and mature hedgerows. Three fields are designated as Burledge Sidelands and Meadows a Site of Nature Conservation Interest (SNCI), and, since November 2005, as a Site of Special Scientific Interest (SSSI) covering 48.7 ha.

Burledge hillfort is a univallate Iron Age hillfort. The site was investigated three times: in 1955 by the University of Bristol Spelaeological Society and in 1959 and 1966 by field investigation. In 1955, the excavating archaeologists found evidence of post or stake holes, ditches, pits, and gullies inside the fort. They also found artifacts like a part of an iron fibula, animal bones, and pottery. One find which evidenced that metalworking was done at this site was the discovery of iron slag.

== Demographics ==
According to the 2001 census, the Chew Valley South ward (which includes Bishop Sutton and Stowey) had 1,222 residents, living in 476 households, with an average age of 40.3 years. Of these, 76% of residents described their health as 'good', 25% of 16- to 74-year-olds had no qualifications; and the area had an unemployment rate of 1.9% of all economically active people aged 16–74. In the Index of Multiple Deprivation 2004, it was ranked at 28,854 out of 32,482 wards in England, where 1 was the most deprived LSOA and 32,482 the least deprived.

== Church ==
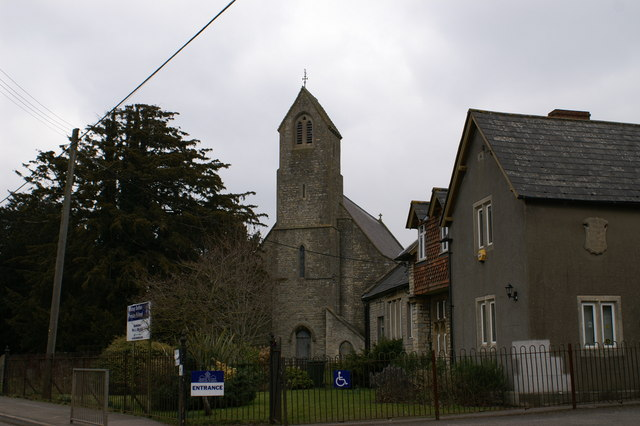
Church & Primary School

The Church of the Holy Trinity in Wick Road is the Church of England parish church. The building dates from 1848 and is a grade II listed building. During 2006 a grant of £64,000 was received from English Heritage to replace the roof of the church.

The village also has a Methodist chapel that dates in part from the 1780s, and it is thought that John Wesley (the founder of Methodism) may have preached there.

== The Elms ==
The Elms on Sutton Hill Road is a detached house dating from the early 18th century which has grade II listed building status.

== Education ==
As of 2011, the village school has 175 pupils aged 4–11 years on the roll. It dates back to 1842 and was originally a school for pupils up to the age of 14. At one time it was a Church school but no longer has this status. The building today consists of the original Victorian school and 5 other classrooms in a new building.

After the age of 11, most pupils attend Chew Valley School

== Sport and leisure ==
Bishop Sutton A.F.C. were officially established in 1977, although it is actually a reformed version of a club that dated from the early 1900s. Bishop Sutton joined the Western Football League in 1991 after playing in the Somerset County League and prior to that the Bristol and Avon League. A title in the 1997–98 season in Division One earned the club a promotion to the Premier Division, where they have played ever since. They reached the 3rd round of the FA Vase in the 1995–96 season, losing to AFC Lymington.

There is also a tennis club and amateur theatre group in the village.

In 2011, residents of Bishop Sutton and surrounding villages banded together to form a new charity, the Chew Valley Youth Trust, to combat the declining provision in leisure and recreational activities for young people in the region. In response to the closure of local Youth Clubs and declining state support for local transport, the charity combats issues of rural isolation and provides young residents with recreational activities.

== Notable residents ==
- Liam Fox, a Conservative MP and former member of the cabinet, used to live in Bishop Sutton but sold his house in 2005/6.
- The former professional footballer Andy Williams was brought up in Bishop Sutton

== Bibliography ==
- Durham, I. & M. (1991). Chew Magna and the Chew Valley in Old Photographs. Redcliffe Press. ISBN 1-872971-61-X.
- Janes, Rowland, ed. (1987). The Natural History of the Chew Valley. ISBN 0-9545125-2-9.
- Ross, Lesley, ed. (2004). Before the Lake: Memories of the Chew Valley. The Harptree Historic Society. ISBN 0-9548832-0-9.
