= Sir Edward Strachey, 3rd Baronet =

Sir Edward Strachey, 3rd Baronet (1812–1901) was an English man of letters.

== Life ==
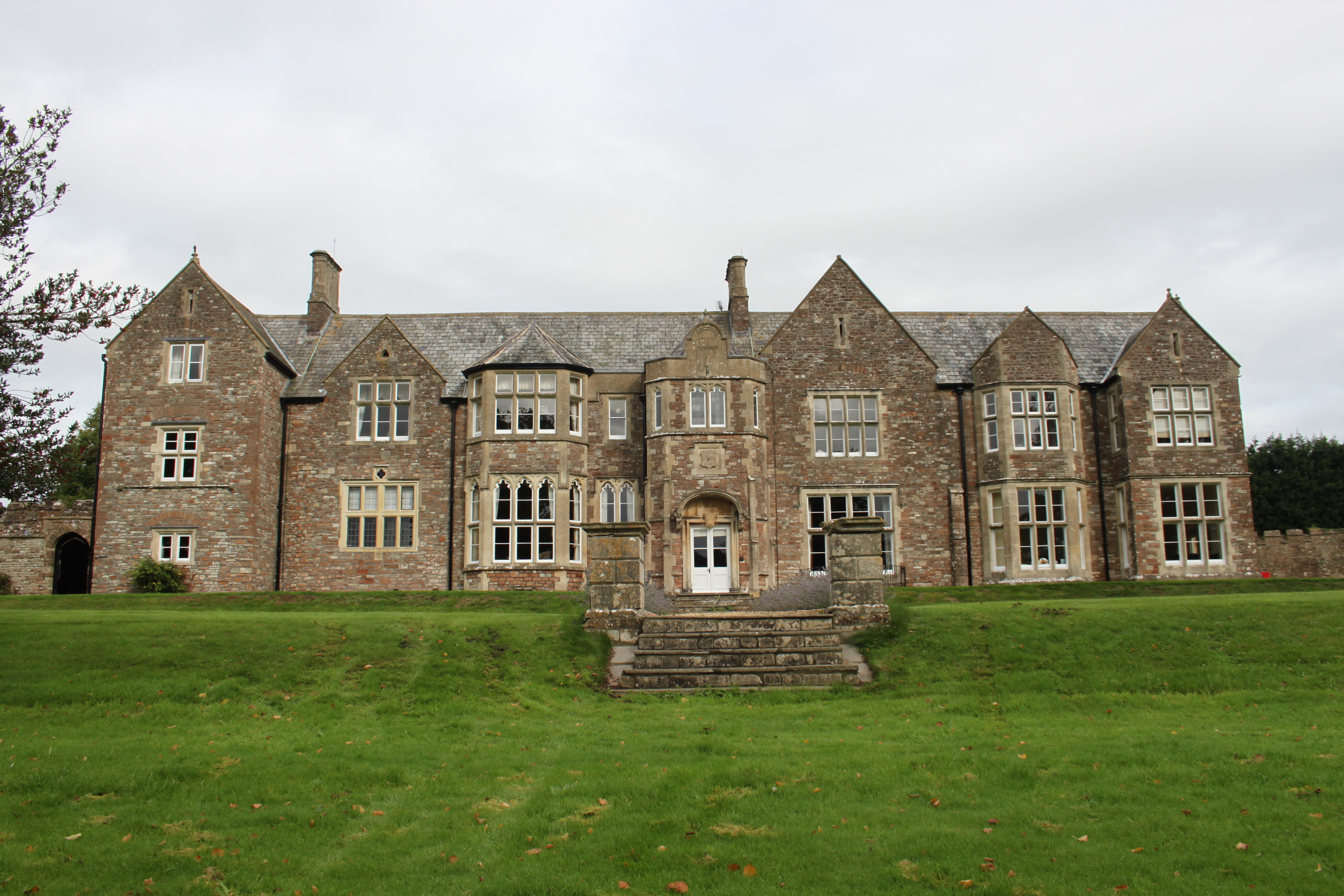
Sutton Court

Born at Sutton Court, Chew Magna, Somerset, on 12 August 1812, he was eldest of the six sons of Edward Strachey (1774–1832) of the Bengal service of the East India Company, son of Sir Henry Strachey, 1st Baronet, and his wife Julia Woodburn, third daughter of Major-general William Kirkpatrick. His five brothers were: Sir Henry Strachey (1816–1912) of the Bengal army; Sir Richard Strachey; William Strachey (1819–1904), of the colonial office; Sir John Strachey; and George Strachey who was minister at the court of Saxony. Destined for the East India Company's service, he was educated at Haileybury, but when about to sail for India suffered from inflammation of the knee-joint, which forced him to use crutches for more than twenty years.

In 1836, attracted by Subscription no Bondage by F. D. Maurice, Strachey obtained an introduction through John Sterling, a friend of his mother; and asked to be allowed to read with Maurice for university entrance. His affliction forced him to give up the plan, but he spent the second half of the year with Maurice at Guy's Hospital. Maurice became his spiritual adviser.

In 1858 Strachey succeeded to the title and Somerset estates of his uncle, Sir Henry Strachey, 2nd Baronet, who had died unmarried. He was a concerned landlord, an active magistrate and a deputy-lieutenant, and in 1864 was High Sheriff of Somerset; he was also a poor-law guardian and a member of the first Somerset County Council. A Liberal in politics, he was an admirer of William Ewart Gladstone. As a disciple of Maurice he was an Anglican, but opposed to the High Church doctrines, and maintained an interest in biblical criticism.

Strachey died at Sutton Court on 24 September 1901, and was buried in Chew Magna churchyard.

== Works ==
Strachey published:

- A Commentary on the Marriage Service, 1843.
- Shakespeare's Hamlet: an Attempt to find a Key to a great Moral Problem, 1848.
- Hebrew Politics in the Time of Sargon and Sennacherib: an Inquiry into the Meaning of the Prophecies of Isaiah, 1853, revised and enlarged as Jewish History and Politics, 1874.
- Miracles and Science, 1854.
- Politics Ancient and Modern, with F. D. Maurice, in "Tracts for Priests", 1861.
- Talk at a Country House, 1895, originally published in the Atlantic Monthly.

Strachey also edited Malory's Morte d'Arthur (1868, 1891) for the Globe edition; contributed to Richard Garnett's edition of Thomas Love Peacock's works "Recollections" of the author, Peacock having been a colleague of Strachey's father at India House; and wrote an introduction to Edward Lear's Nonsense Songs (1895). In 1870 wrote a series of articles in the Daily News on the proposed Irish Land bill, for which material was supplied him by his friend and neighbour Chichester Fortescue. He occasionally made translations from Persian poems. Besides his books he wrote articles in The Spectator, Blackwood's Magazine and other periodicals.

== Family ==
Strachey married twice:

His first marriage on 27 August 1844 was to Elizabeth Wilkinson, eldest daughter of the Rev. W. Wilkinson, of Woodbury Hall, Bedfordshire; she died without issue on 11 April 1855. He re-married, on 3 November 1857, to Mary Isabella Symonds, second daughter of John Addington Symonds; she died on 5 October 1883, leaving three sons and a daughter:

- Edward Strachey, 1st Baron Strachie (1858–1936)
- John St. Loe Strachey (1860–1927)
- Henry Strachey (1863–1940)
- Frances Strachey, who married in 1902 William Henry Cantrell Shaw, of Normanton House, Derby.

== Notes ==
Attribution

This article incorporates text from a publication now in the public domain: Lee, Sidney, ed. (1912). "Strachey, Edward". Dictionary of National Biography (2nd supplement). Vol. 3. London: Smith, Elder & Co.

Baronetage of the United Kingdom
Preceded by Henry Strachey	Baronet (of Sutton Court); 1858–1901	Succeeded by Edward Strachey
