= Stowey-Sutton =

Civil parish in Somerset, England

Coordinates: 51°20′11″N 2°35′17″W

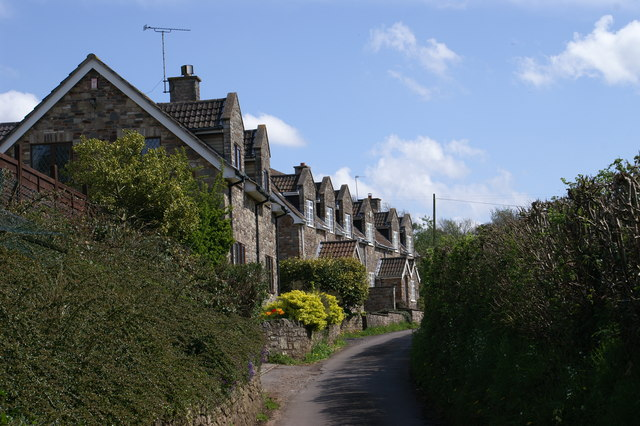
- Cottages at Stowey Bottom

- Location within Somerset
- Population: 1,361 (2011 census)
- Civil parish: Stowey-Sutton
- Unitary authority: Bath and North East Somerset
- Ceremonial county: Somerset
- Region: South West
- Country: England
- Sovereign state: United Kingdom
- Police: Avon and Somerset
- Fire: Avon
- Ambulance: South Western

Stowey-Sutton is a civil parish in the Bath and North East Somerset District of Somerset, England within the Chew Valley. The parish contains the villages of Stowey and Bishop Sutton having a population of 1,361.

The civil parish was created in 1949 from the former civil parish of Stowey and part of the civil parish of Chew Magna.

== Governance ==
The parish council has responsibility for local issues, including setting an annual precept (local rate) to cover the council's operating costs and producing annual accounts for public scrutiny. The parish council evaluates local planning applications and works with the local police, district council officers, and neighbourhood watch groups on matters of crime, security, and traffic. The parish council's role also includes initiating projects for the maintenance and repair of parish facilities, such as the village hall or community centre, playing fields and playgrounds, as well as consulting with the district council on the maintenance, repair, and improvement of highways, drainage, footpaths, public transport, and street cleaning. Conservation matters (including trees and listed buildings) and environmental issues are also of interest to the council.

The parish falls within the unitary authority of Bath and North East Somerset which was created in 1996, as established by the Local Government Act 1992. It provides a single tier of local government with responsibility for almost all local government functions within its area including local planning and building control, local roads, council housing, environmental health, markets and fairs, refuse collection, recycling, cemeteries, crematoria, leisure services, parks, and tourism. It is also responsible for education, social services, libraries, main roads, public transport, trading standards, waste disposal and strategic planning, although fire, police and ambulance services are provided jointly with other authorities through the Avon Fire and Rescue Service, Avon and Somerset Constabulary and the Great Western Ambulance Service.

Bath and North East Somerset's area covers part of the ceremonial county of Somerset but it is administered independently of the non-metropolitan county. Its administrative headquarters is in Bath. Between 1 April 1974 and 1 April 1996, it was the Wansdyke district and the City of Bath of the county of Avon. It was before 1974 that the parish was part of the Clutton Rural District.

The parish is represented in the House of Commons of the Parliament of the United Kingdom as part of North East Somerset and Hanham. It elects one member of parliament (MP) by the first past the post system of election.

The Stowey Sutton Neighbourhood Development Plan has been developed by Bath and North East Somerset being a part of council's development plan according to section 38A(4) of the Planning and Compulsory Purchase Act 2004. This decision was taken because 95% of people have voted in favour of the Plan in the Stowey Sutton Neighbourhood Plan referendum on Friday 7 August 2015.

== Folly Farm ==
Near to the village is Folly Farm, a 17th-century farm with traditionally managed, unimproved, neutral grassland, flowery meadows and woodlands with splendid views run by Avon Wildlife Trust. Folly Farm includes two SSSI – the meadows (19.36 hectares) and Dowlings Wood (9 hectares).
