= Strachey baronets =

Baronetcy in the Baronetage of the United Kingdom

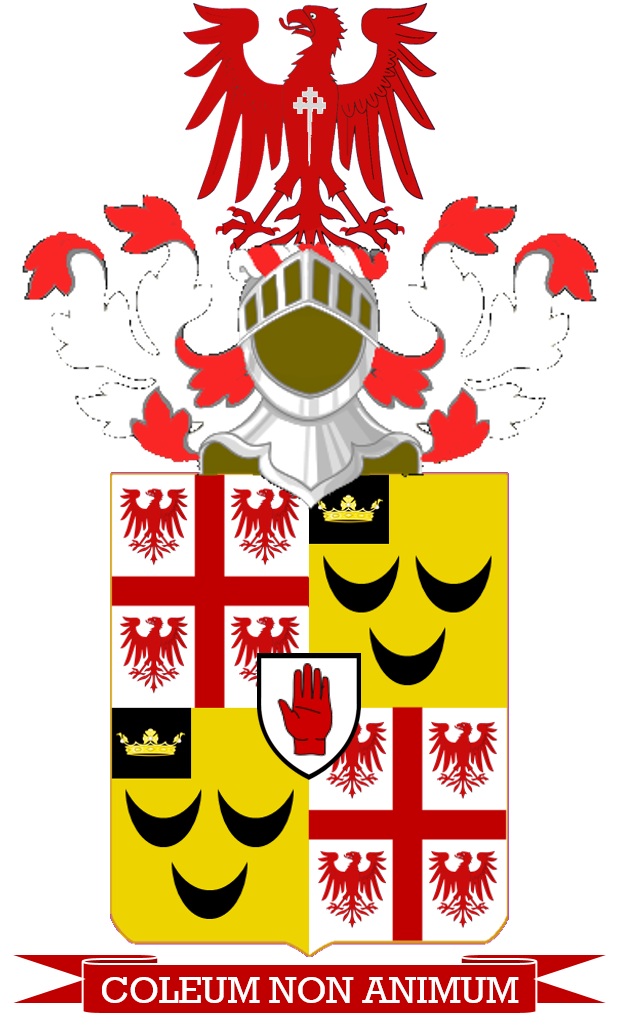
- Blazon Arms: Quarterly: 1st & 4th Argent a cross between four eagles displayed Gules (Strachey), 2nd & 3rd Or three crescents two and one Sable on a canton of the last a ducal crown Or. Crest: An eagle displayed Gules charged on the breast with a cross-crosslet fitchée Argent.
- Creation date: 2 June 1801
- Created by: George III
- Peerage: Baronetage of the United Kingdom
- First holder: Henry Strachey
- Heir presumptive: Henry Strachey
- Remainder to: heirs male (of the body of the grantee)
- Status: Dormant
- Extinction date: Saffron Walden, Essex
- Seats: Sutton Court, Somerset
- Motto: Coelum Non Animum (The Circumstances May Change But Not The Mind)

The Strachey baronetcy, of Sutton Court in the County of Somerset, England, is a title in the Baronetage of the United Kingdom. This family was originally seated at Walden, Essex, where William Strachey was living under the rule of Edward VI. Later they moved to Surrey and at last settled at Sutton Court, Somerset. The title was created on 15 June 1801 for the politician and civil servant Henry Strachey. Sir Henry was private secretary to Lord Clive during his last expedition to India in 1764. He also took part in negotiations for peace with North America where he assisted the kings commissioners at Paris. He died in 1809 and was succeeded by his eldest son Henry, the second Baronet Strachey. His great-grandson, the fourth Baronet, was a Liberal politician. On 3 November 1911, he was created Baron Strachie, of Sutton Court in the County of Somerset, in the Peerage of the United Kingdom. He later served as Paymaster General. The peerage became extinct on the death of his son, the second Baron, in 1973. The baronetage is currently dormant.

The family surname is pronounced "Stray-chee".

== Strachey baronets, of Sutton Court (1801) ==
- Sir Henry Strachey, 1st Baronet (1737–1810)
- Sir Henry Strachey, 2nd Baronet (1772–1858)
- Sir Edward Strachey, 3rd Baronet (1812–1901)
- Sir Edward Strachey, 4th Baronet (1858–1936) (created Baron Strachie in 1911)

=== Barons Strachie (1911) ===
- Edward Strachey, 1st Baron Strachie (1858–1936)
- Edward Strachey, 2nd Baron Strachie (1882–1973)

=== Strachey baronets, of Sutton Court (1801; reverted) ===
- Charles Strachey, presumed 6th Baronet (1934–2014), did not use the title. The late Baron was succeeded in the baronetcy by his first cousin once removed, the sixth Baronet. He was the son of John Strachey, son and namesake of John Strachey, second son of the third Baronet. Strachey died January 2014, without using his title. Also, he had not successfully proven his succession and was therefore not on the Official Roll of the Baronetage, with the baronetcy considered dormant.
- Henry Leoffric Benvenuto Strachey, presumed 7th Baronet (born 1947), son and heir of the 6th baronet.

== Extended family ==
Several other members of the Strachey family have also gained distinction. John Strachey, grandfather of the first Baronet, was a noted geologist, while his father, John Strachey (died 1674), was a friend of John Locke. Edward Strachey, second son of the first Baronet, was the father of 1) the civil servant John Strachey, and 2) Lieutenant-General Sir Richard Strachey, who was the father of Lytton Strachey, James Strachey, Oliver Strachey and Dorothy Bussy. The aforementioned John Strachey, second son of the third Baronet, was a noted journalist, while his son John Strachey was a Labour politician. Another son of the third Baronet, Henry Strachey, was a painter and art critic. Sir Edward Strachey, third Baronet (1812–1901) was a religious and philosophical writer, the son of Edward Strachey, the second son of 1st Baronet Harry Strachey.

== Notes ==
Baronetage of the United Kingdom
Preceded by De Saumarez baronets	Strachey baronets of Sutton Court; 6 June 1801	Succeeded by Pepys baronets
