= Sir Henry Strachey, 1st Baronet =

British politician (1736–1810)

Sir Henry Strachey Bt
- Born: 23 May 1736; Edinburgh, Midlothian, Scotland
- Died: 3 January 1810 (aged 73)
- Burial place: St George's Church, Hanover Square, Westminster, England

Sir Henry Strachey, 1st Baronet (23 May 1736 – 3 January 1810) was a British civil servant and politician who sat in the House of Commons for 39 years from 1768 to 1807.

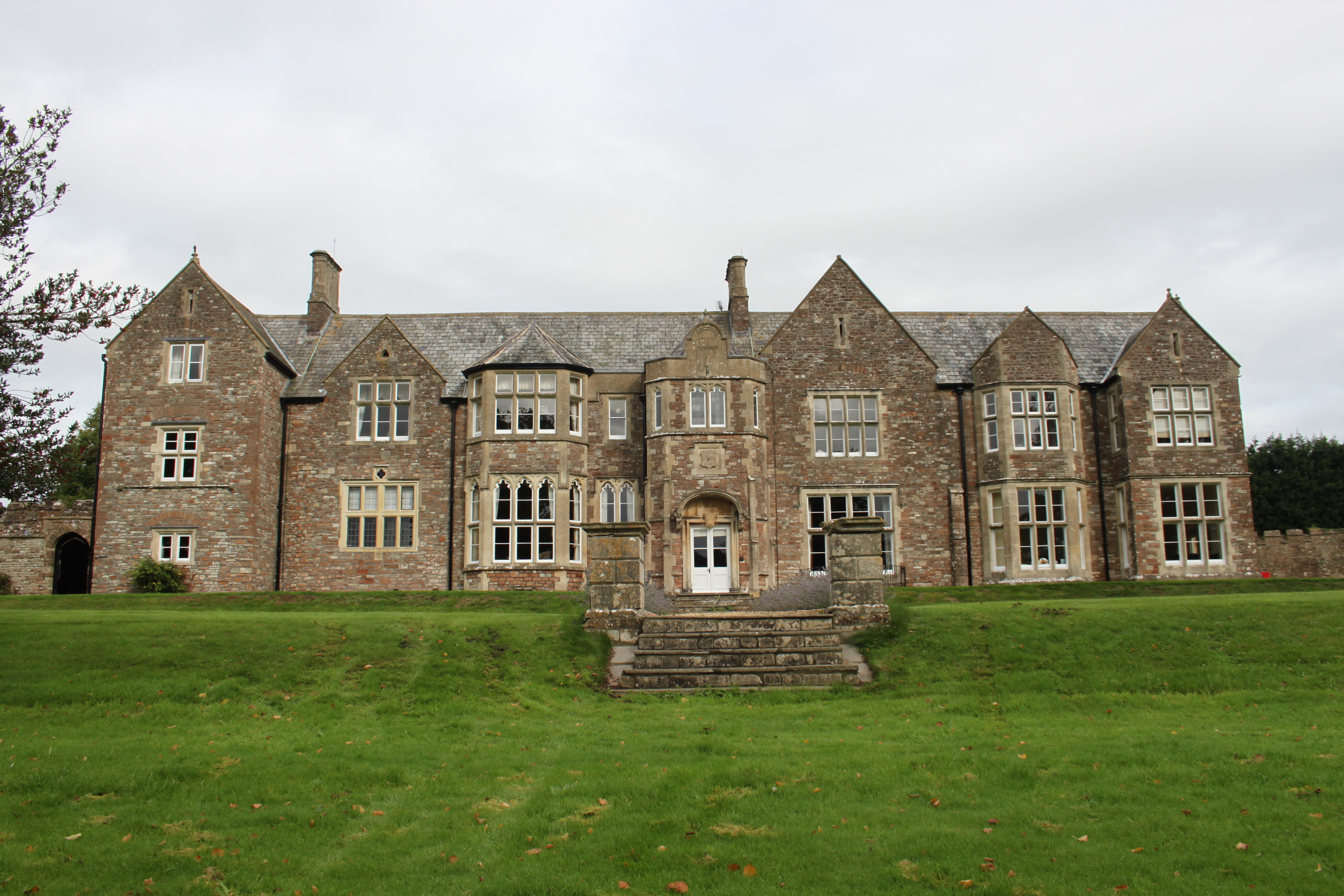
Sutton Court, Somerset

== Life ==
Strachey was the eldest son of Henry Strachey, of Sutton Court, Somerset, and his first wife Helen, daughter of Robert Clerk, a Scottish physician. His grandfather was the geologist John Strachey and his great-grandfather John Strachey was a friend of John Locke.

He was appointed private secretary to Lord Clive in India in 1762, a position he held until 1768, when he was returned to Parliament for Pontefract. He sat for this constituency until 1774, and later represented Bishop's Castle from 1774 to 1778 and from 1780 to 1802, Saltash from 1774 to 1780 and East Grinstead from 1802 to 1807. Strachey was Clerk of the Deliveries of the Ordnance from 1778 to 1780 and Principal Storekeeper of the Ordnance from October 1780 to May 1782 and after a hiatus again in 1783–84. He served under the Marquess of Rockingham as Joint Secretary to the Treasury in 1782 and under the Earl of Shelburne as Joint Under-Secretary of State for the Home Department from 1782 to 1783.

He took part in the peace negotiations with the American colonies in Paris in 1783 with Richard Oswald representing the British and John Jay, Johns Adams and Benjamin Franklin representing the Americans. This resulted in the Treaty of Paris (1783). He later served as Master of the Household between 1794 and 1810.

In 1801, he was created a Baronet, of Sutton Court in the County of Somerset.

Strachey died in January 1810, aged 73, and was succeeded in the baronetcy by his eldest son Henry. His memorial in Chew Magna was created by John Bacon.

== Family ==
In 1770 Strachey married Jane, only daughter of Capt. John Kelsall (1702-1787), the widow of Capt. Thomas Latham. They had three sons and one daughter. His second son Edward Strachey was the father of John Strachey and Lieutenant-General Sir Richard Strachey and the grandfather of Lytton Strachey, James Strachey, Oliver Strachey and Dorothy Bussy. Other descendants of Strachey include the Liberal politician Edward Strachey, 1st Baron Strachie, the journalist John Strachey and the Labour politician John Strachey. Lady Strachey died on 12 February 1824.

Parliament of Great Britain
| Preceded by The Viscount Galway; Sir Rowland Winn | Member of Parliament for Pontefract; 1768–1774; With: The Viscount Galway 1768–1772; The Viscount Galway 1772–1774; Robert Monckton 1774 | Succeeded by Sir John Goodricke; Charles Mellish |
| Preceded by George Clive; Alexander Wedderburn | Member of Parliament for Bishop's Castle; 1774–1778; With: George Clive | Succeeded by George Clive; Alexander Wedderburn |
| Preceded by Grey Cooper; Sir Charles Whitworth | Member of Parliament for Saltash; 1778–1780; With: Grey Cooper | Succeeded by Grey Cooper; Paul Wentworth |
| Preceded by Alexander Wedderburn; William Clive | Member of Parliament for Bishop's Castle; 1780–1801; With: William Clive | Succeeded by Parliament of the United Kingdom |
Parliament of the United Kingdom
| Preceded by Parliament of Great Britain | Member of Parliament for Bishop's Castle; 1801–1802; With: William Clive | Succeeded by William Clive; John Robinson |
| Preceded by Nathaniel Dance; Charles Ellis | Member of Parliament for East Grinstead; 1802–1807; With: Daniel Giles | Succeeded by Charles Ellis; Richard Wellesley |
Political offices
| Preceded by Benjamin Langlois | Clerk of the Deliveries of the Ordnance; 1778–1780 | Succeeded by John Kenrick |
| Preceded by Benjamin Langlois | Storekeeper of the Ordnance; 1780–1782 | Succeeded by John Aldridge |
| Preceded by Sir Grey Cooper; John Robinson | Secretary to the Treasury; 1782; With: Edward Chamberlain; Richard Burke | Succeeded by Thomas Orde; George Rose |
| Preceded by Thomas Orde | Under-Secretary of State for the Home Department; 1782–1783 | Succeeded by Hon. George North |
| Preceded by John Aldridge | Storekeeper of the Ordnance; 1783–1784 | Succeeded by John Aldridge |
Court offices
| Preceded by Sir Francis Henry Drake | Master of the Household; 1794–1810 | Succeeded by William Kenrick |
Baronetage of the United Kingdom
| New creation | Baronet (of Sutton Court); 1801–1810 | Succeeded by Henry Strachey |
