= Brenda Pye =

English painter (1907–2005)

Brenda Pye (formerly Landon, originally Capron)
- Born: 29 November 1907; Somerset, England
- Died: 26 April 2005 (aged 97); London, England
- Occupations: Portrait and landscape painter
- Spouse(s): 1st E A R Landon, 2nd C A Pye
- Children: 1 daughter
- Parent(s): Walter Evelyn Capron and Mary Capron (nee Whistler)

Brenda Pye (29 November 1907 – 26 April 2005), also known as Brenda Landon or Brenda Capron, was an English portrait painter and landscape artist. She exhibited at the Royal Academy, the Paris Salon, the Royal Society of Portrait Painters, the Royal Society of British Artists and the Association of Women Artists; she was also a member of the Association of Sussex Artists.

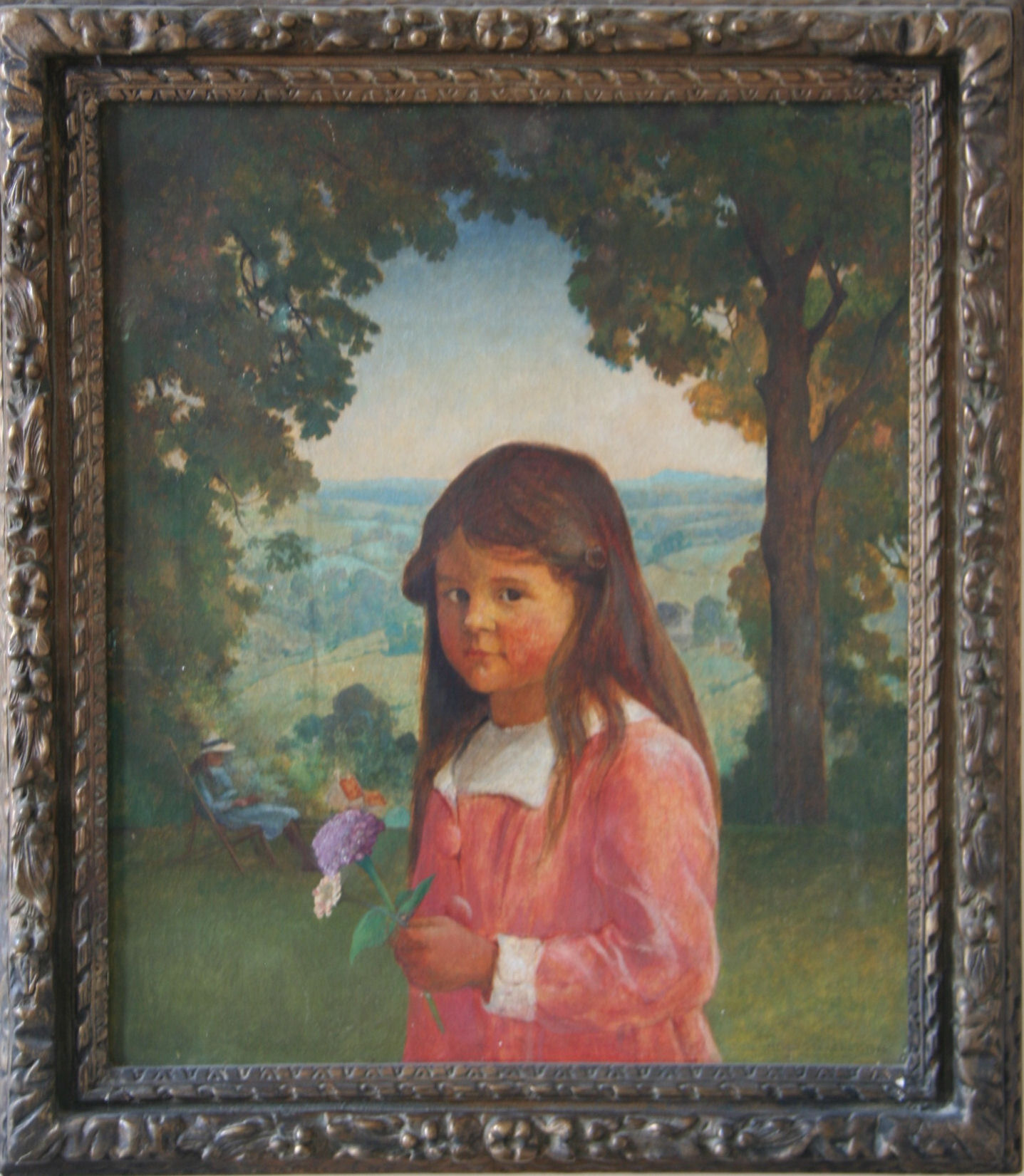
Brenda Capron painted by Henry Strachey in 1914

== Early life ==
She was born on 29 November 1907, and died in London at the age of 97 on 26 April 2005. She was the youngest child of a barrister called Walter Capron who was himself the youngest son of a landed gentry family seated at Southwick Hall in Northamptonshire. Her mother's maiden name was Whistler, and through her she was a distant cousin of the English artist Rex Whistler and his brother the glass engraver Sir Laurence Whistler; she was also more distantly related to the Anglo-American artist James McNeill Whistler.

Her earliest years were spent at her birthplace: Shortwood House, Litton, in Somerset, to which her father had retired from his London practice. A three-quarter length portrait of her in the gardens of Shortwood House in the summer of 1914, was painted by Henry Strachey, at that time the art critic of the Spectator, who lived nearby. However, from 1916 until her death, she lived in London and Sussex.

== Education ==
She was educated privately and at Eastbourne Ladies College, Sussex, before taking up a scholarship to study at Eastbourne College of Art. A review of the College's annual exhibition in The Times on 24 June 1925 (p 8 column F) singled out the work of Brenda Capron for "particular mention". At Eastbourne College of Art, her tutors included Eric Ravilious and she was gold medallist. This entitled her to a further scholarship at Chelsea School of Art in London where she continued her studies as a pupil of Graham Sutherland and others. She also had a travelling scholarship to Paris.

== Early work ==
Her paintings at this time were mainly figure paintings in oil on canvas, but she also excelled in pencil portraits and studies, and a pencil nude was her first major exhibited work, at the Royal Academy summer exhibition of 1932, when she was 24. She had by then (on 12 November 1929) married her first husband, E A R Landon, brother of Christopher Landon, and is therefore listed in the published volumes of Royal Academy Exhibitors 1905-1970 (1973–82), and in The Dictionary of British Artists 1880-1940 (1976)), under her married name of Brenda Landon. The marriage ended in divorce during the Second World War. Her daughter by this marriage, Susan Reay Gail Landon, was the mother of Sir Martin Griffiths and a cousin of Perceval Landon.

As a wartime resident of Lewes, Brenda Landon helped Mrs Byng-Stamper in the well-known art gallery she and her sister set up during the War in the stables of their house at Millers, in Lewes, and through her came across Duncan Grant, and sat for his life class as a model.

After the war, she was art mistress at Fairdene School for Girls, where she set up a pottery. Later, she established and ran the pottery at Glynde Place (near Glyndebourne). Most of her pottery is from this period.

== As Brenda Pye ==
In 1961, she married again. Her second husband, with whom she was to live for the next 33 years, until he died in 1994, was Cecil Pye, the stepfather of the playwright Sir Alan Ayckbourn and nephew of the founder of the Pye radio and television manufacturing business. He had a studio built for her in the grounds of his Jacobean farmhouse in Buxted, Sussex, and Brenda Pye (as she now was), entered her most prolific period as an artist.

She was commissioned to paint many portraits, including the journalist and broadcaster Fyfe Robertson and the Headmaster of the London Oratory School John McIntosh OBE. Her portraits were exhibited in London at the Royal Society of Portrait Painters and in Paris at the Paris Salon.

However, most of her work was now landscape painting in oil on canvas (sometimes, however, with palette knife or on wood), and she particularly loved Ashdown Forest, which she painted over and over again. She also painted during travels with her husband in Scotland and France, and to a lesser extent in Wales, Portugal, Italy and South Africa.

Her style became softer and more impressionistic than her work during and before the war, but it was only occasionally purely abstract. Her favoured medium was always oil on canvas, but she also painted on board or wood (mainly flowers), and (especially in the later 1970s and 1980s) in watercolour. After her second marriage, she favoured brighter colours and a softer, less precise draughtsmanship than before the War and she was a very rapid worker, whether painting portraits or landscape. She always painted directly from life: never from photographs and usually without preparatory drawings.

Her landscapes and flower paintings were exhibited at the Paris Salon, and in London by the Royal Society of British Artists and the Association of Women Artists. She also had one-woman exhibitions of her work in Sussex.

== Final years ==
Her last full scale portrait, of a young barrister in wig and gown, was painted in 1987. After that, she was affected by cataracts in both eyes which, with some physical frailty, forced her to stop painting from life. However, she continued to paint abstract designs in watercolour.

== Brenda Landon Pye Portrait Prize ==
Chelsea College of Art and Design awards an annual prize for portraiture called the Brenda Landon Pye Portrait Prize in her memory. The winners have been:

- 2006 Tom Downes and Adelita Husni-Bey (joint winners)
- 2007 Keiji Ishida
- 2008 Margot Sanders
- 2009 Lindsey Bull and Connie Sides (joint winners)
- 2010 Tom Anholt and Arthur Owen (joint winners)
- 2011 Joe Walker
- 2012 No award
- 2013 Ellie Preston

In 2009, Chelsea College of Art and Design is also running a series of Brenda Landon Pye Painting Technique Workshops.

== Sources ==
- Royal Academy Exhibitors 1905-1970 (1973–82)
- Dictionary of British Artists 1880-1940 (1976)
- The Society of Women Artists Exhibitors 1855-1996 (1996)
- Interview in Sussex Express 10 May 1968
- Brenda Landon Pye Portrait Prize website
