= John Strachey (journalist) =

British journalist and newspaper man (1860–1927)

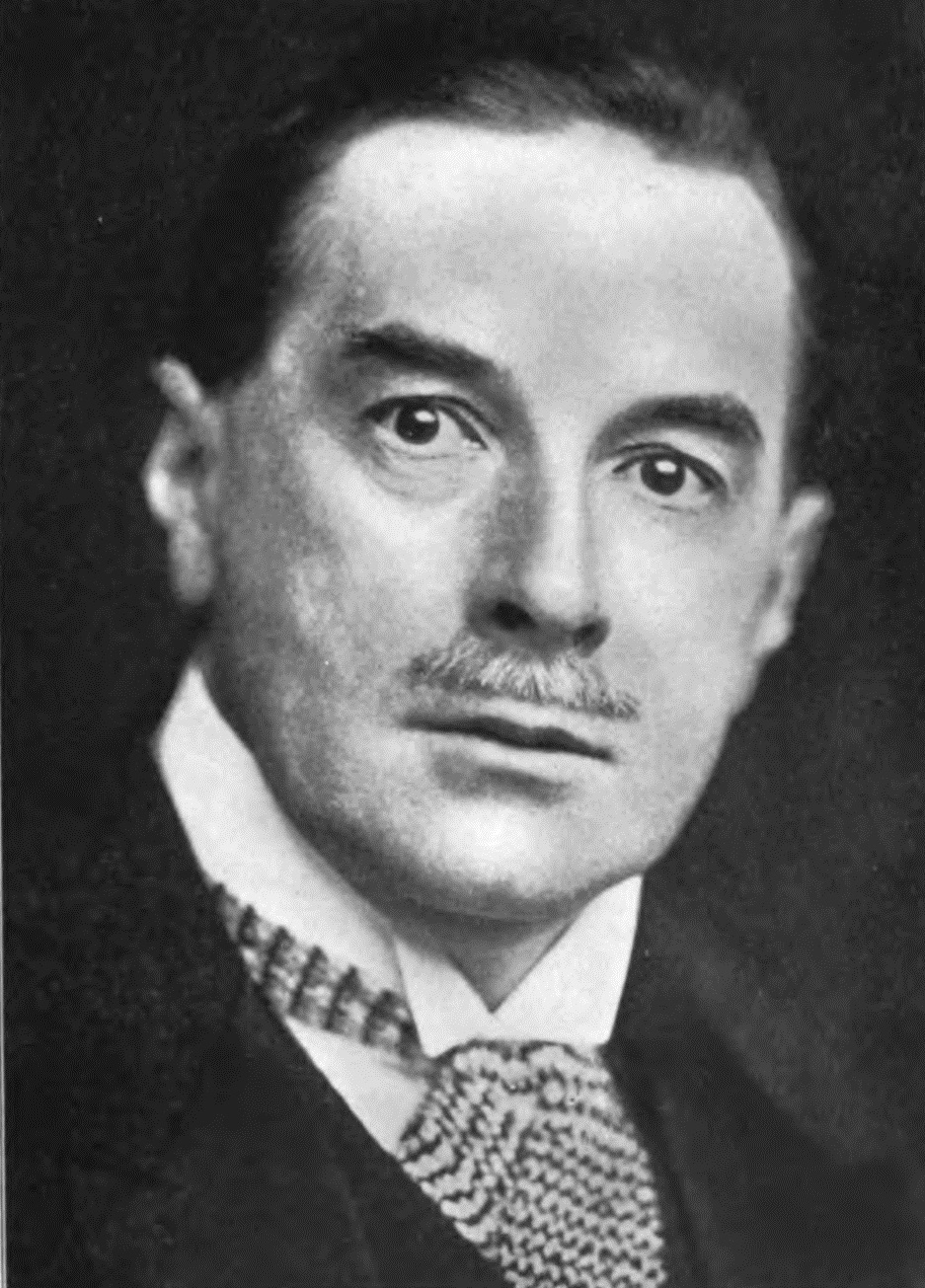
John St Loe Strachey

John St Loe Strachey (9 February 1860 – 26 August 1927), was a British journalist and newspaper proprietor.

== Life ==
Strachey was the second son of Sir Edward Strachey, 3rd Baronet, and his wife Mary Isabella (née Symonds), and the brother of Edward Strachey, 1st Baron Strachie, and Henry Strachey. He was educated at Eton College and Balliol College, Oxford, and later called to the Bar, but chose to take up journalism as his profession. Between 1887 and 1925, he was editor of The Spectator. He was a close friend and confidant of the diplomat, Sir Cecil Spring Rice, with whom he corresponded for many years.

Strachey also edited (1896–1897) The Cornhill Magazine.

Strachey's son John became a Labour politician and government minister.

His daughter Amabel married the architect Clough Williams-Ellis.

== Publications ==
- The Adventure of Living : a Subjective Autobiography,

== See also ==
- Strachey Baronets

Media offices
Preceded by R. H. Hutton	Editor of The Spectator; 1887 - 1925	Succeeded by Evelyn Wrench
