= George Clive (died 1779) =

British politician

George Clive (1720 – 23 March 1779) was a British politician.

== Background ==
Clive was the son of Reverend Benjamin Clive, Vicar of Duffield, Derbyshire, and Susannah (née Floyer). His father was the uncle of Robert Clive, 1st Baron Clive (“Clive of India”).

== Political career ==
Clive was elected Member of Parliament for Bishop's Castle in 1763, a seat he held until his death 16 years later.

== Family ==
Clive married Sidney, daughter of Thomas Bolton, in 1763. They had four known children:

- Louisa (d. 16 Mar 1832), who married Frederick Keppel, son of Frederick Keppel, Bishop of Exeter. They had three sons.
- Edward Clive (d. 22 Jul 1845)
- Theophilus, who married Fanny McClintock, daughter of John McClintock MP for Enniskillen. They had one son, Theophilus, who married Frances Caroline Somerset, daughter of Lord Robert Somerset.
- Henry (d. 16 March 1848), who married Charlotte Jane Buller, but died without issue.

Clive died in March 1779.

Parliament of Great Britain
Preceded by Francis Child; Peregrine Cust	Member of Parliament for Bishop's Castle; 1763–1779; With: Peregrine Cust 1763–1768; William Clive 1768–1770; Alexander Wedderburn 1770–1774, 1778–1779; Henry Strachey 1774–1778	Succeeded by Alexander Wedderburn; William Clive
