= Sutton Court =

Grade II listed building in Stowey, UK

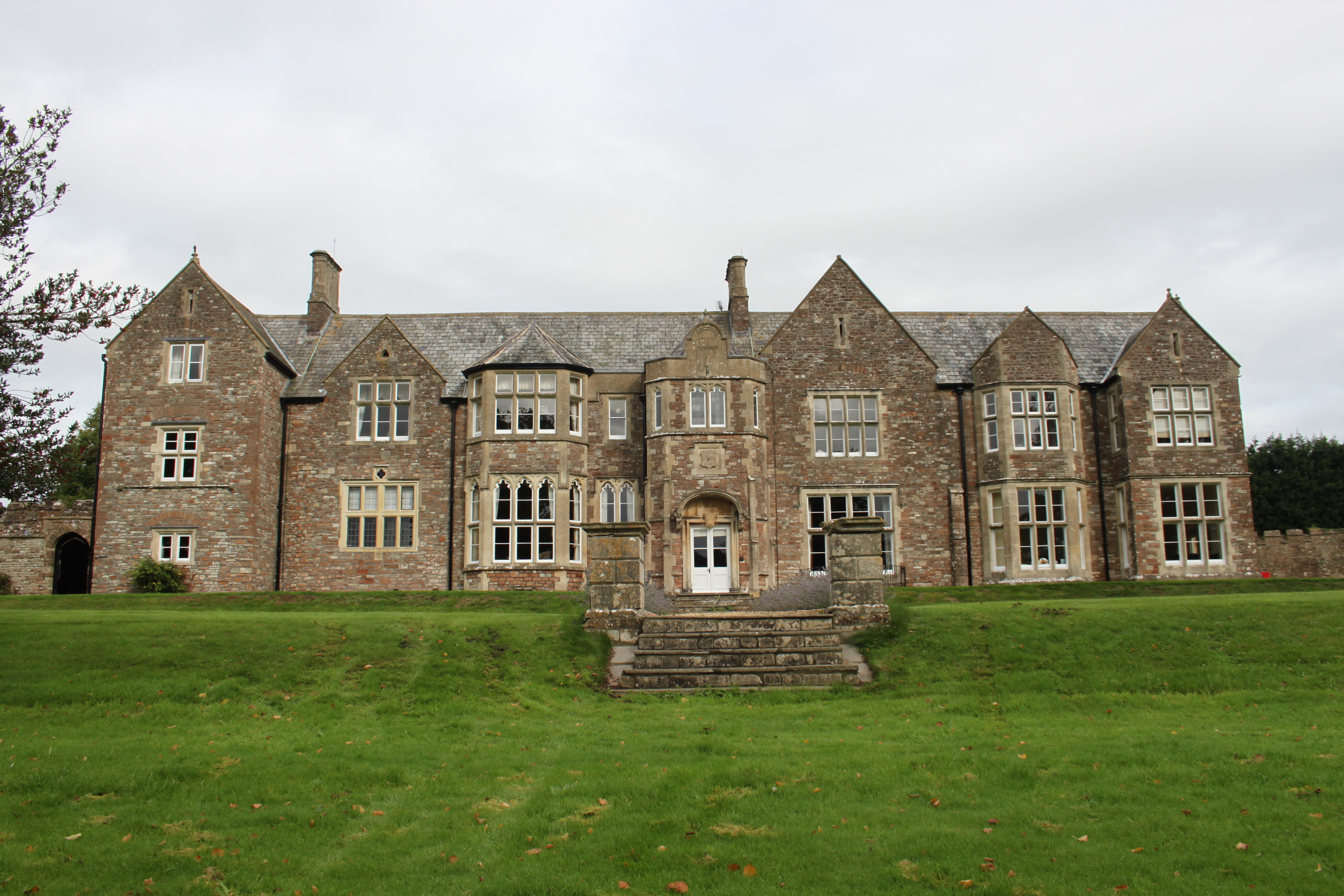
- The rear façade remodelled by Thomas Henry Wyatt in 1858

- Location within Somerset
- 51°20′30″N 2°34′49″W
- Location: Stowey, Somerset, England

History
- Built: 14th, 15th, 16th centuries

Listed Building – Grade II*
- Official name: Sutton Court
- Designated: 21 September 1960
- Reference no.: 1129576

Listed Building – Grade II
- Official name: Sutton Court Lodge, gates and gatepiers
- Designated: 15 January 1986
- Reference no.: 1129577

Listed Building – Grade II
- Official name: Curtain Wall to north of Sutton Court with gazebo
- Designated: 15 January 1986
- Reference no.: 1136595

Sutton Court is an English house remodelled by Thomas Henry Wyatt in the 1850s from a manor house built in the 15th and 16th centuries around a 14th-century fortified pele tower and surrounding buildings. The house has been designated as Grade II* listed building.

The house is at Stowey in the Chew Valley in an area of Somerset now part of Bath and North East Somerset and near to the village of Bishop Sutton. The house is surrounded by an extensive estate laid out as a ferme ornée, part of which is now the Folly Farm nature reserve. The estate is boarded by the villages of Chew Magna to the north, Cholwell to the south, Clutton to the east and the reservoir Chew Valley Lake to the west.

Since the early modern period the house has been the country seat of several prominent families including the St Loes, one of whom married Bess of Hardwick. They lived at Sutton Court and expanded the property in the second half of the 16th century. Throughout the 18th and 19th centuries it was owned by the Strachey baronets and their descendants until it was sold in 1987 and converted into apartments. In the early 1980s the house was used as a film location for the BBC Look and Read series Dark Towers, a series very popular to this day in primary schools.

== History ==
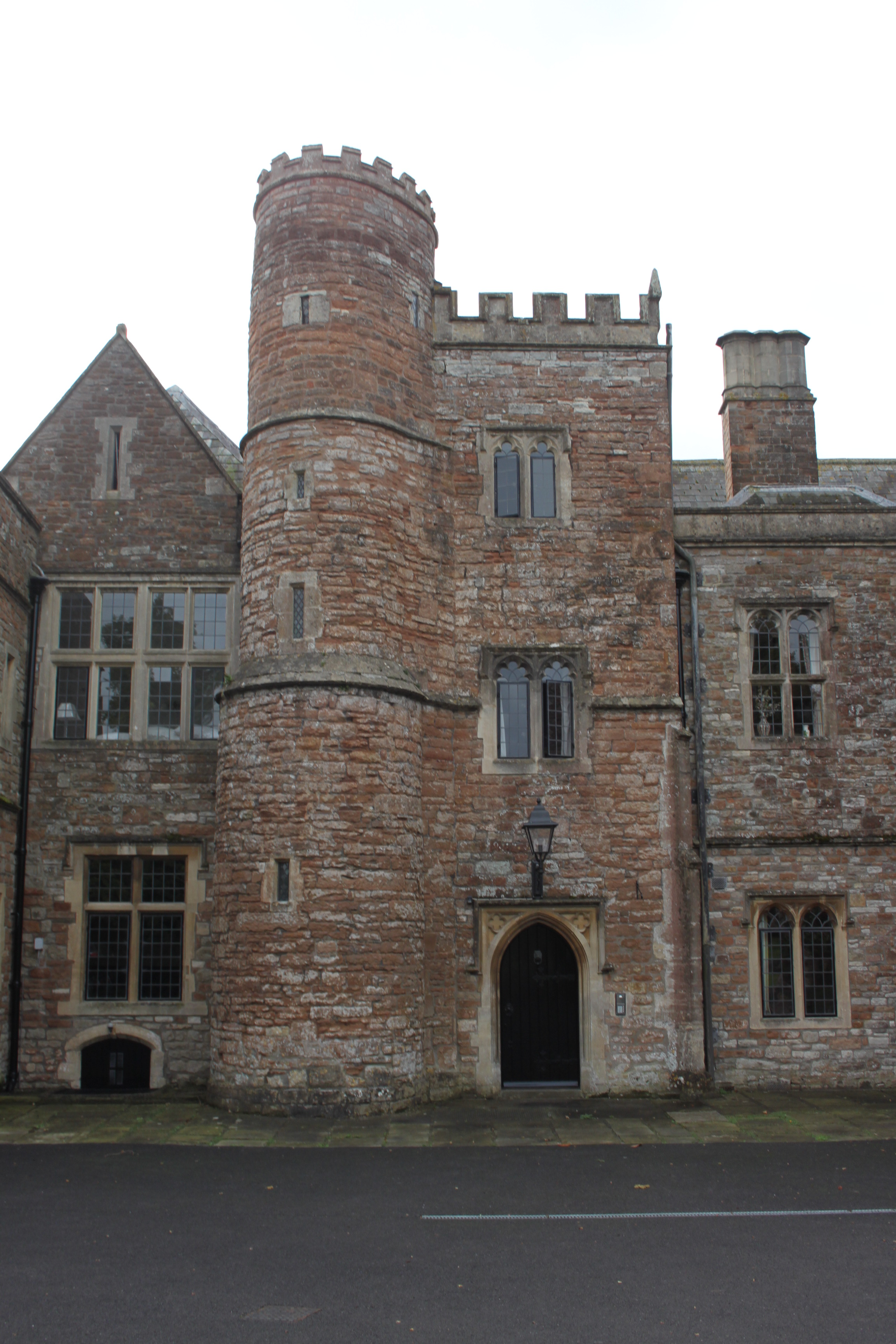
The 14th century tower

The original tower of a fortified house forms a central part of the current building and was built in the 14th century by Walter de Sutton. The estate was later purchased by the St Loe family of Newton St Loe Castle, who expanded the hall and established a small deer park of around 200 acres (81 ha) which covered the site now occupied by Folly Farm. A length of original embattled wall, also built in the 14th century, survives.

G.W. and J.H. Wade suggest that Bishop Hooper, Anglican Bishop of Gloucester and Worcester, found asylum at Sutton Court around 1550 during the Marian Persecutions when the house was owned by the Protestant sympathiser Sir John St Loe, a member of parliament (MP) and High Sheriff of Somerset. Sir John St Loe was a friend and neighbour of John Locke a philosopher and physician regarded as one of the most influential of Enlightenment thinkers and widely known as the Father of Classical Liberalism. Locke who lived in Belluton, Pensford approximately 3 miles (4.8 km) from Sutton Court. John St Loe was buried at the local Church of St Andrew, Chew Magna.

About 1558, according to a date on a fireplace, Bess of Hardwick and her third husband, Sir John's son Sir William St Loe, added a north east wing with a parlour and chapel, which includes Tudor buttresses. Sir William St Loe was a soldier, politician and courtier. His official positions included Captain of the Yeomen of the Guard, Chief Butler of England and member of parliament for Derbyshire. He died suddenly without male issue in 1564/5, which Mary S. Lovell suggests may have been as a result of poisoning by his younger brother. All his property was left to Bess, to the detriment of his daughters and brother. When Bess died in 1608 the house was left to her son Charles Cavendish.

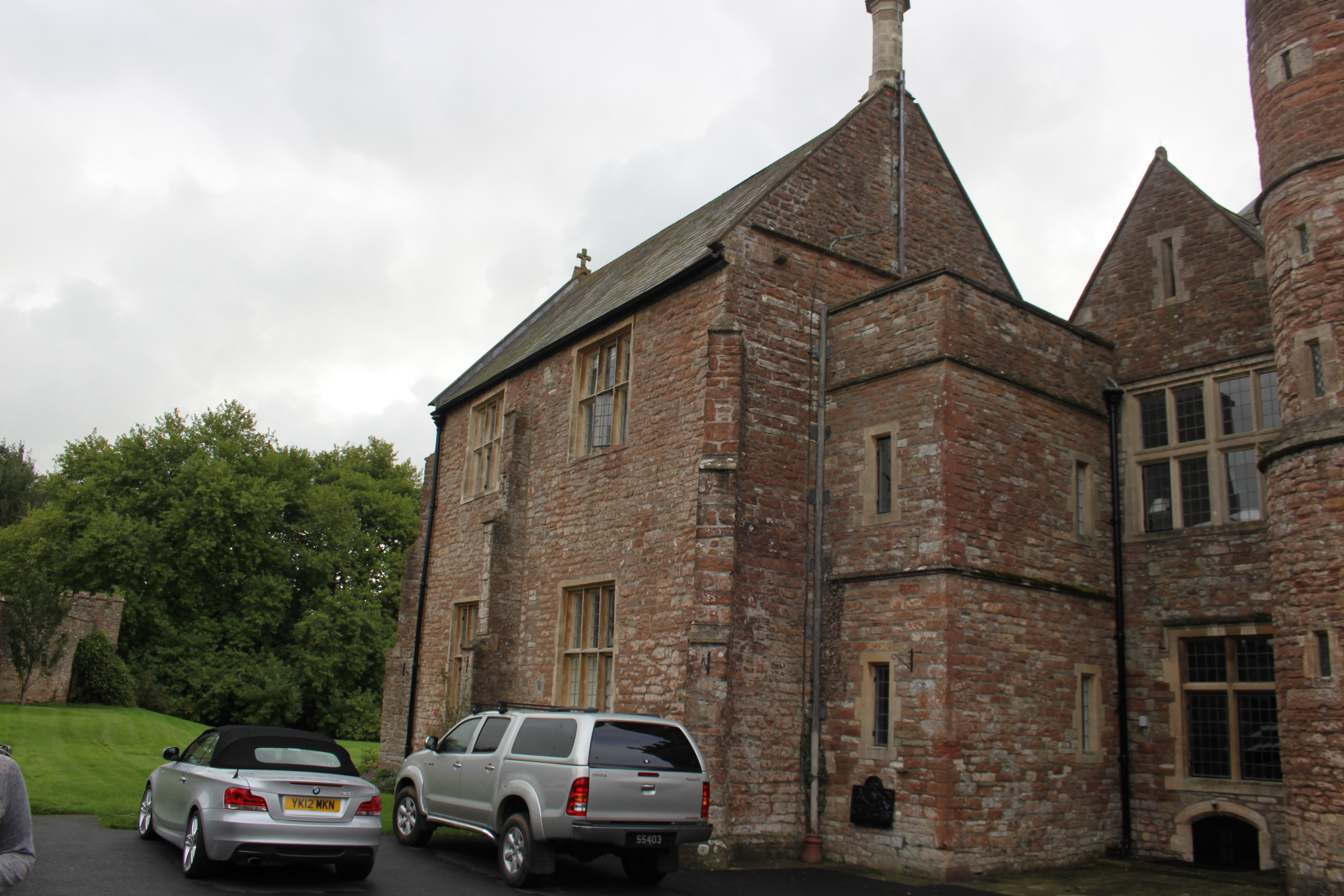
The north wing containing the chapel and parlour which was added by William St Loe in 1558

In the early 17th century it was the seat of Richard Jones and his son Sir William Jones, the Attorney General of England. In the 1650s the estate was bought by the Baber family.

The house soon became the seat of the Strachey family including John Strachey, the geologist, who inherited estates including Sutton Court from his father in 1674 at three years of age. He introduced a theory of rock formations known as stratum, based on a pictorial cross-section of the geology under the estate and coal seams in nearby coal works of the Somerset Coalfield. He projected them according to their measured thicknesses and attitudes into unknown areas between the coal workings. The purpose was to enhance the value of his grant of a coal-lease on parts of his estate. This work was later developed by William Smith.

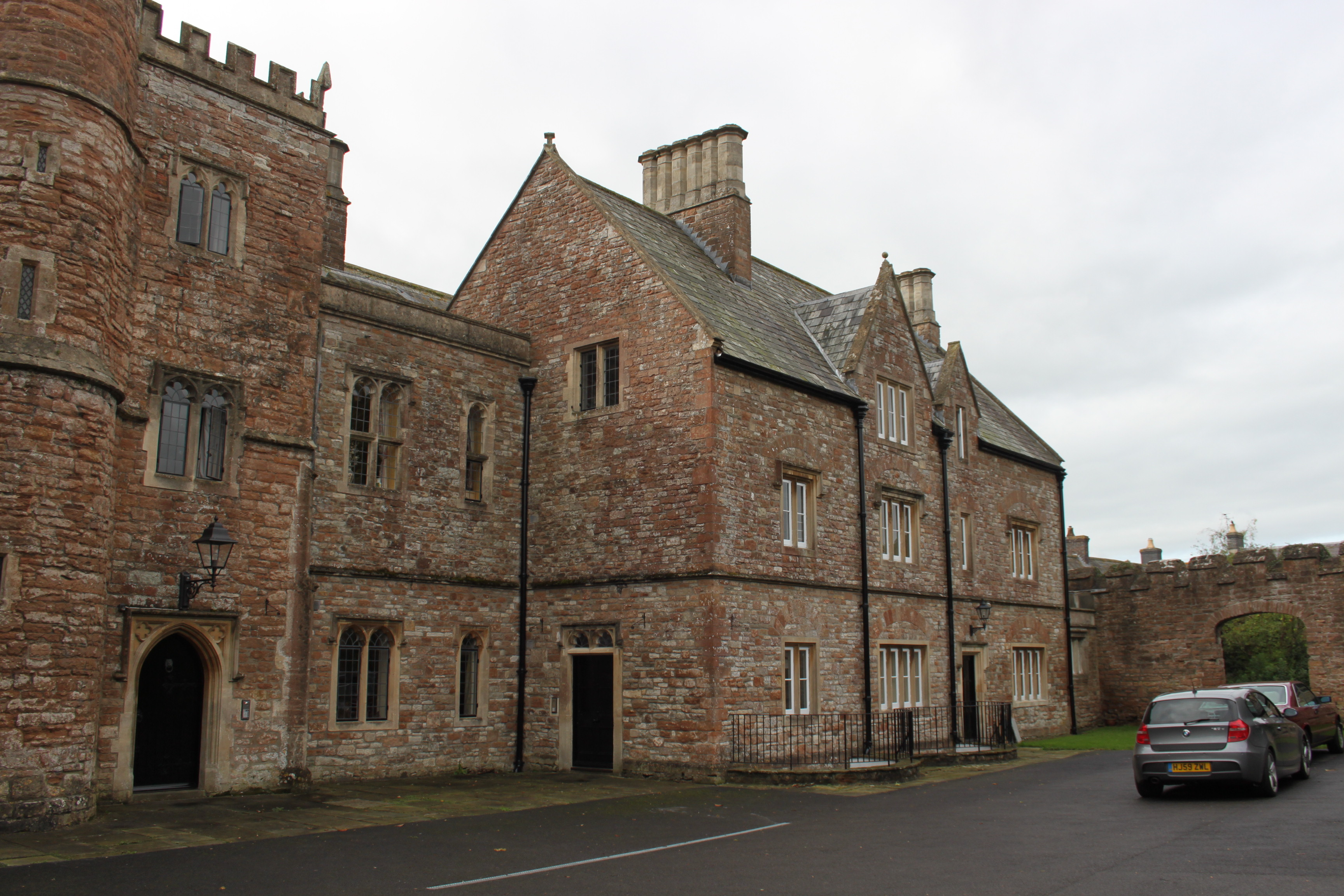
The 1860 servants wing added by Edward Strachey

Henry Strachey, the grandson of the geologist and a senior civil servant, was created a baronet in 1801. When he inherited the house in the 18th century the house had been mortgaged, however the mortgage was redeemed by Strachey's employer Clive of India.

Henry Strachey, the 2nd Baronet, was appointed High Sheriff of Somerset in 1832 and Edward Strachey the 3rd Baronet High Sheriff in 1864. In 1858 much of the house was remodelled for the 3rd Baronet by Thomas Henry Wyatt.

The 4th Baronet who was also Edward Strachey, a Liberal politician, was returned to Parliament for Somerset South at the 1892 general election. He served under Sir Henry Campbell-Bannerman and later H. H. Asquith as Treasurer of the Household from 1905 to 1909 and under Asquith as Parliamentary Secretary to the Board of Agriculture and Fisheries from 1909 to 1911. He was raised to the peerage as Baron Strachie in 1911. During the 1970s major restoration work was undertaken to deal with dry rot and replace wiring which resulted in the removal of several ceilings and decorations from many of the rooms.

After the death of Edward Strachey, 2nd Baron Strachie in 1973, it passed to Tory MEP Charles Strachey, 4th Baron O'Hagan, the grandson of Frances Constance Maddalena (d.1931), daughter of the 1st Baron Strachie He sold it in 1987 for conversion into flats.

The building is now private apartments set in fifteen acres (6.1 hectares) of communal grounds, including a trout lake and tennis court. It is run by a management company made up of the residents.

== Architecture ==
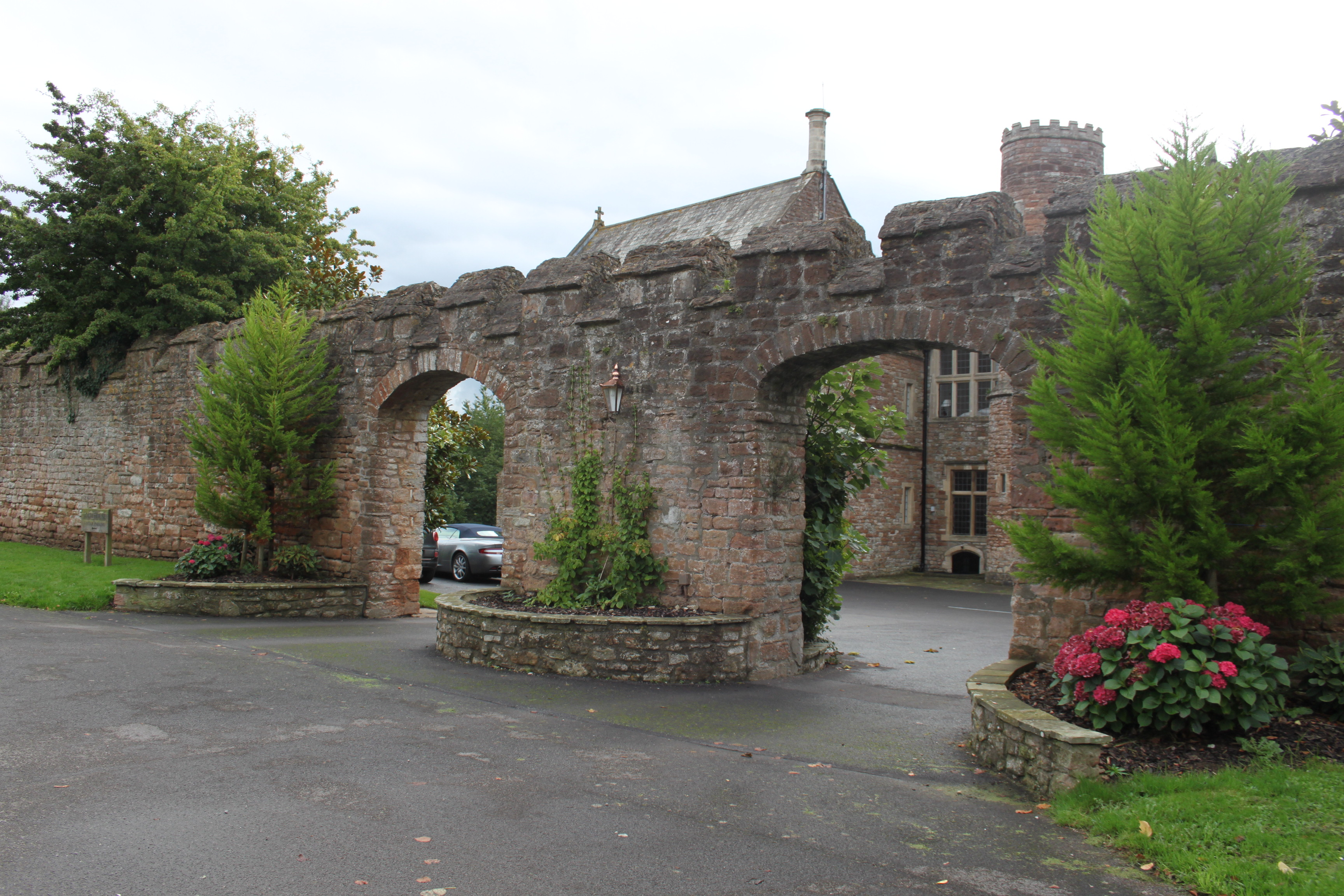
Archways in the curtain wall

Sutton Court is built of squared and coursed sandstone rubble throughout with freestone and ashlar dressings, copings, slate roofs. The north front comprises a central three-storey fourteenth century pele tower with a taller circular stair turret and two-storey ranges linking it to the 1558 'Bess of Hardwick Building' to the left and a four bay 1858–1860 servants' wing of three storeys to the right. Windows to the pele tower and right-hand linking range are 15th century, of two cusped lights with hood moulds, some of which have been renewed, and some relocated from other areas. The doorway to the tower dates from 1858 to 1860. The windows to the left-hand linking range and the 'Hardwick Building' are four and six lights, with chamfered mullions. The two-storey 'Hardwick' range has diagonal offset buttresses. There are eighteenth-century battlements to the pele tower, with tall octagonal ashlar stacks.

To the north of the servants wing are old stables and stable yard with a coach house and groom's cottage along with the laundry and wash house, which was once a brew house.

A curtain wall to the north of the house with a gazebo is also designated as a listed building. It includes 14th century masonry at the bottom of the wall; however most of the structure as it is now dates from the 18th and 19th centuries. The corner gazebo was built in the 19th century.

The gate lodge, gates and gatepiers were built around 1820.

== Estate ==
During the late 18th and early 19th centuries a ferme ornée was established, with planting of various trees and the damming of streams to form ponds with paths and seating around them. Tenant farmers leased the majority of the land and during most of the 20th century it was used for dairy cattle, sheep and pigs. Much of the estate was sold in 1987 to the Avon Wildlife Trust who established their Folly Farm nature reserve on the site.
