= Church of St Nicholas and the Blessed Virgin Mary, Stowey =

Church in Somerset, England

Church of St Nicholas and the Blessed Virgin Mary
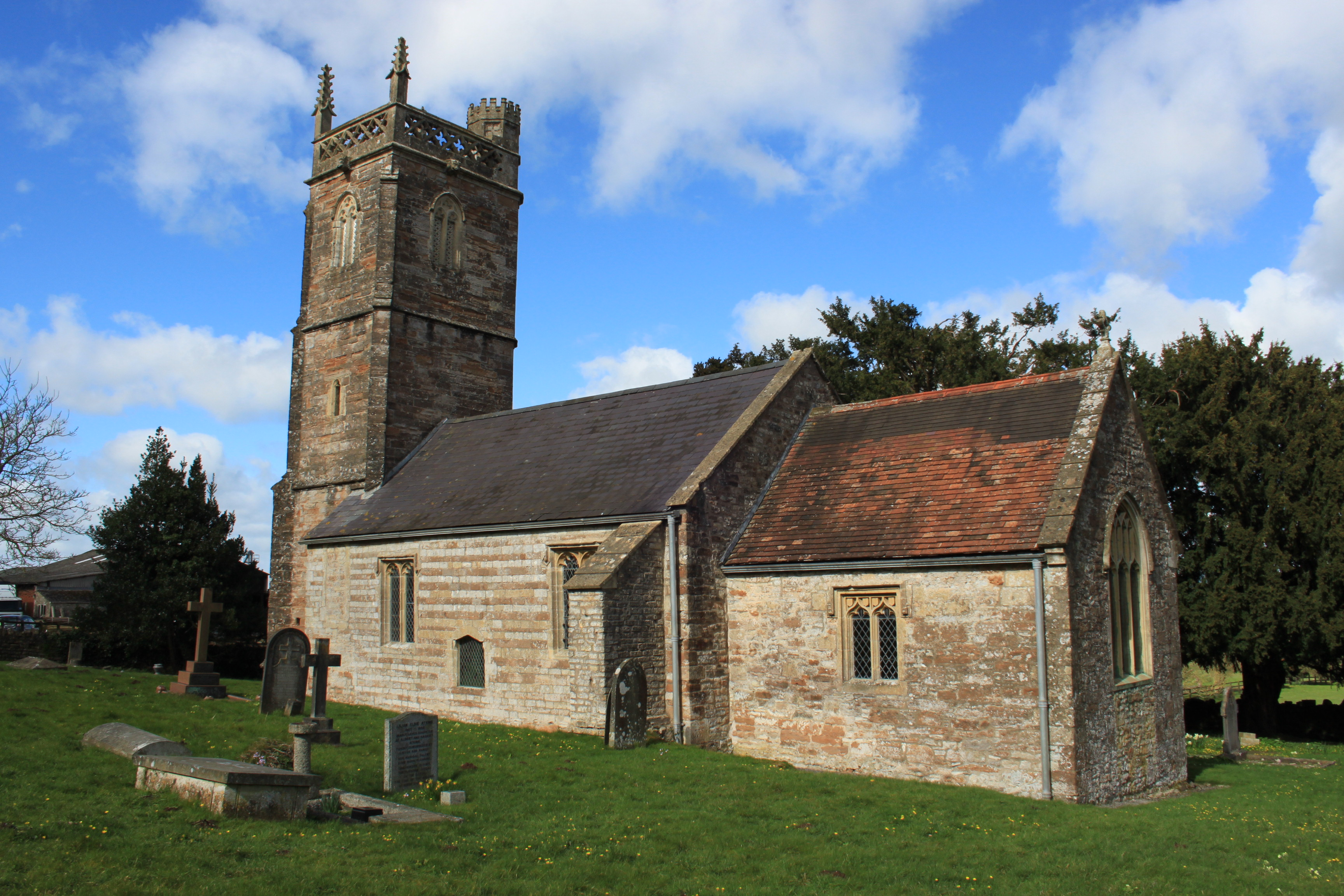

- Location within Somerset
- 51°19′57″N 2°34′36″W
- Location: Stowey, Somerset, England

History
- Built: 13th century

Listed Building – Grade II
- Designated: 21 September 1960
- Reference no.: 1129575

The Anglican Parish Church of St Nicholas and the Blessed Virgin Mary at Stowey within the English county of Somerset dates from the 13th century. It is a Grade II listed building.

There may have been a wooden church on the site at the time of the Domesday Book, although the first written record from the Bath cartulary is of 1235. The oldest part of the current stone church is the chancel at the eastern end, which now contains the altar and has a small priest's door, above which is a small carved figure. The nave was added in the 14th century. The three-stage tower, which was added in the 14th or early 15th century, is supported by diagonal buttresses and has a stair turret in the northeast corner. It has six bells which are regularly rung for services. Five of the bells are from the local foundry of the Bilbie family, to which a sixth from the Whitechapel Bell Foundry was added in 1991.

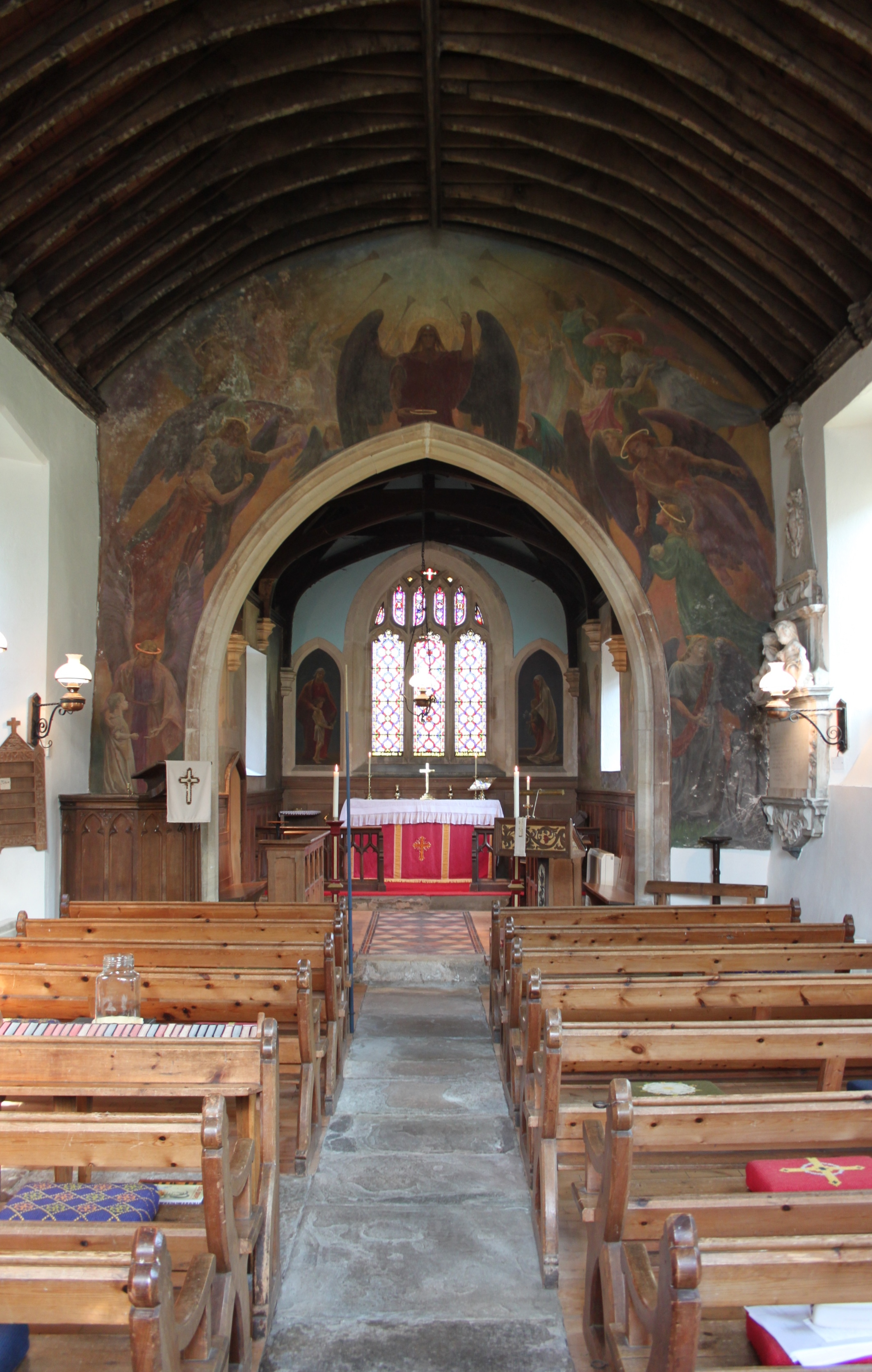
The Last Judgement by Henry Strachey above the chancel arch

The church, which is adjacent to Stowey House, is built of the same local red sandstone, with alternating lias and red sandstone bands to the nave. It has a tiled roof above the chancel, while the nave and north porch have a slate roof. The church was altered in the 17th century, and in the 19th it underwent a Victorian restoration that included replacement of part of the roof and removal of the double-decker pulpit and a gallery. Inside the church are wall paintings by Henry Strachey from the early 20th century. There are life-sized representations of St Nicholas and St Mary on either side of the altar. Also in the chancel are paintings of the miraculous Feeding the multitude and of disciples on the road to Emmaus. The Last Judgment is pictured over the chancel arch with an equal number of angels of light and darkness.

There are also wall monuments from the mid-18th century by Thomas Paty and other sculptors, commemorating the Jones and Sandford families. The font is from the 14th century. The organ was installed in the 1930s and electrified when electricity was brought into the church in 1965. Above the entrance door is a funerary hatchment which was made to celebrate the restoration of Charles II in 1660.

During the 16th or 17th century, the parish was a chapelry of Chew Magna. The parish is within the Chew Magna Deanery itself within the archdeaconry of Bath.

== See also ==
- List of ecclesiastical parishes in the Diocese of Bath and Wells
