= William Clive =

British politician (1745–1825)

William Clive (29 August 1745 – 23 June 1825) was a British politician who sat in the House of Commons for over 40 years between 1768 and 1820.

== Life ==
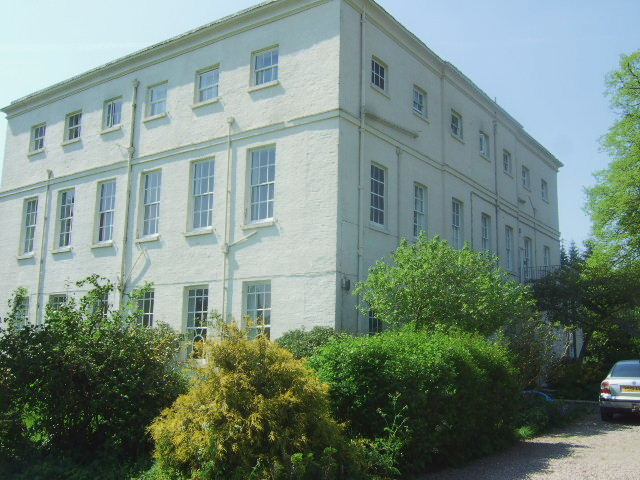
Styche Hall, Shropshire – Clive family home

Clive was the sixth son of Richard Clive of Styche Hall and his wife Rebecca Gaskell, daughter of Nathaniel Gaskell of Manchester and was born on 29 August 1745. He was educated at Eton College from 1760 to 1761. He joined the army and was Cornet in the 1st Dragoons in 1764.

In the autumn of 1767, Clive was going to stand for Leominster at the next general election, but probably because his brother Lord Clive had obtained complete control of Bishop's Castle he was returned there unopposed as Member of Parliament. He then resigned his seat two years later in January 1770 when Lord Clive needed it for Alexander Wedderburn. He became a lieutenant in 1771 and retired from the army in 1776.

Clive was returned again as MP for Bishops Castle by his nephew Edward, Lord Clive in a by-election on 31 March 1779 . He was returned unopposed again in 1780 1784 and 1790. He married his second cousin Elizabeth Clive Rolton, daughter of John Rolton of Duffield, Derbyshire on 25 August 1790. He was elected again in the 1796 general election. In 1798 he was appointed Commissioner of Lieutenancy for Shropshire and held the position to 1804. At the 1802 election there was a contest at Bishops Castle. Although his own seat was not at risk, he was active in thwarting opposition to the family interest while his nephew was away in India. In July 1803 he promoted the Shropshire volunteers. He was returned unopposed in 1806, 1807, 1812 and 1818. He retired in the face of a contest at the 1820 general election. No speech of his is known during his time in the House.

Clive died on 23 June 1825 aged 79.

== Family ==
Clive and his wife Elizabeth had seven sons and a daughter. His first six sons were:

1. Richard Clive (baptised 1792; died 1831) – Indian civil service
2. William Clive (1795–1825)– clergyman Archdeacon of Montgomery
3. Robert Herbert Clive (1796–1867) Bengal Civil Service
4. Edward Clive (1799–1877) British army
5. Henry Bayley Clive (1800–1870) clergyman and member of Parliament
6. George Arthur Clive (died 1881) clergyman

Parliament of Great Britain
Preceded by George Clive; Peregrine Cust	Member of Parliament for Bishops Castle; 1768–1770; With: George Clive	Succeeded by George Clive; Alexander Wedderburn
Preceded by George Clive; Alexander Wedderburn	Member of Parliament for Bishops Castle; 1779–1820; With: Alexander Wedderburn; Henry Strachey; John Robinson; Douglas James William Kinnaird	Succeeded by William Holmes; Edward Rogers
