= Folly Farm, Somerset =

Farm and nature reserve in Somerset, England

Folly Farm
- Site of Special Scientific Interest
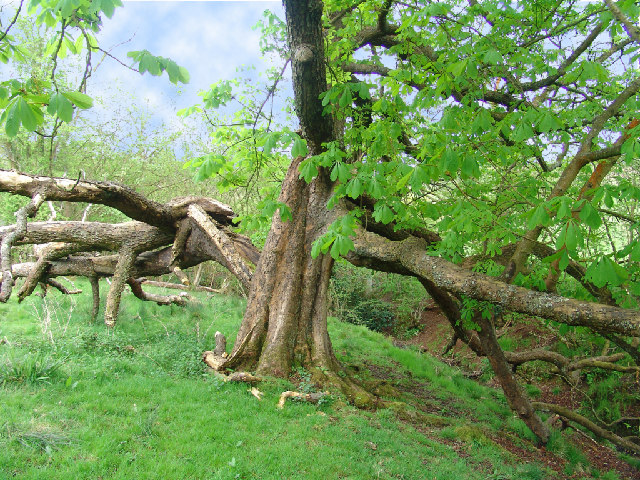

- Location within Somerset
- Location of Folly Farm.
- Area of search: Avon
- Grid reference: ST607604
- Coordinates: 51.34132°N 2.56559°W
- Interest: Biological
- Area: 19.36 hectares (0.1936 km^{2}; 0.0747 sq mi)
- Notification date: 1987

Folly Farm is a traditionally managed working farm and nature reserve run by the Avon Wildlife Trust. It is located between Stowey, Clutton and Stanton Wick in the civil parish of Stowey in the English county of Somerset.

The farm house is 18th century and the surrounding land includes neutral grassland, wildflower meadows and woodlands with splendid views. Much of Folly Farm is designated as a biological Site of Special Scientific Interest. Some of the land has never been ploughed. The SSSI comprises two adjacent areas, the meadows (19.36 hectares) and Dowlings Wood (9 hectares). It is also a Local Nature Reserve.

It can be found near Bishop Sutton in the Chew Valley, just off the A368. The site is situated on a curved ridge of land on neutral soils derived from the underlying Keuper Marl. The soil is of the Icknield Association with dark brown, moist but moderately well-drained clay.

The 250 acres (100 ha) nature reserve includes the Folly Oak which is over 400 years old.

== Wildlife ==
It attracts a wide range of birds including marsh tit (Parus palustris), buzzard (Buteo buteo) and great spotted woodpecker (Dendrocopos major). The pasture is of a kind now rare in the area. In summer the site has a wide variety of flowers such as betony (Stachys), oxeye daisy (Leucanthemum vulgare) and heath spotted orchid (Orchidaceae). In late summer, it is covered with drifts of black knapweed (Centaurea) and devil's bit scabious (scabiosa). Many butterflies can be seen throughout the summer, including marsh fritillary (Euphydryas aurina), ringlet (Aphantopus hyperantus), gatekeeper (Pyronia tithonus) and marbled white (Melanargia galathea).

A number of scarce species of fly are listed from the site in Gibbs (2002). The cranefly Atypophthalmus inustus was recorded in Folly Wood in 2001 and the cranefly Ormosia bicornis was found in both Folly Wood and Dowlings Wood in 2000–2001. Prior to these records there had been no previous published records from the county of Somerset. The fungus gnats Keroplatus testaceus, Macrocera pusilla, Megophthalmidia crassicornis, Exechiopsis dumitrescae and Exechiopsis membranacea have all been recorded, the first four in 2000 in Dowlings Wood, and the last at Folly Wood in 2001. Other species recorded at Dowlings Wood in 2000 were Platypalpus mikii, a member of the family Hybotidae, and the hoverfly Volucella inflata, while the soldierfly Oxycera pardalina was recorded from Folly Wood in 2001. Finally, the picture-winged fly Herina palustris and the hoverflies Criorhina ranunculi and Orthonevra brevicornis were recorded at Folly Farm in 1999.

== Folly Farm Centre ==
The site was purchased from the Strachey family who were lords of the manor of the nearby Sutton Court in 1987.

Avon Wildlife Trust opened Folly Farm Centre as an education venue in May 2008.

The insulation in the centre's roofs is provided by sheep's wool. It also has a solar panel, a biomass boiler fired by wood pellets and a willow sewage treatment area.

== Gallery ==
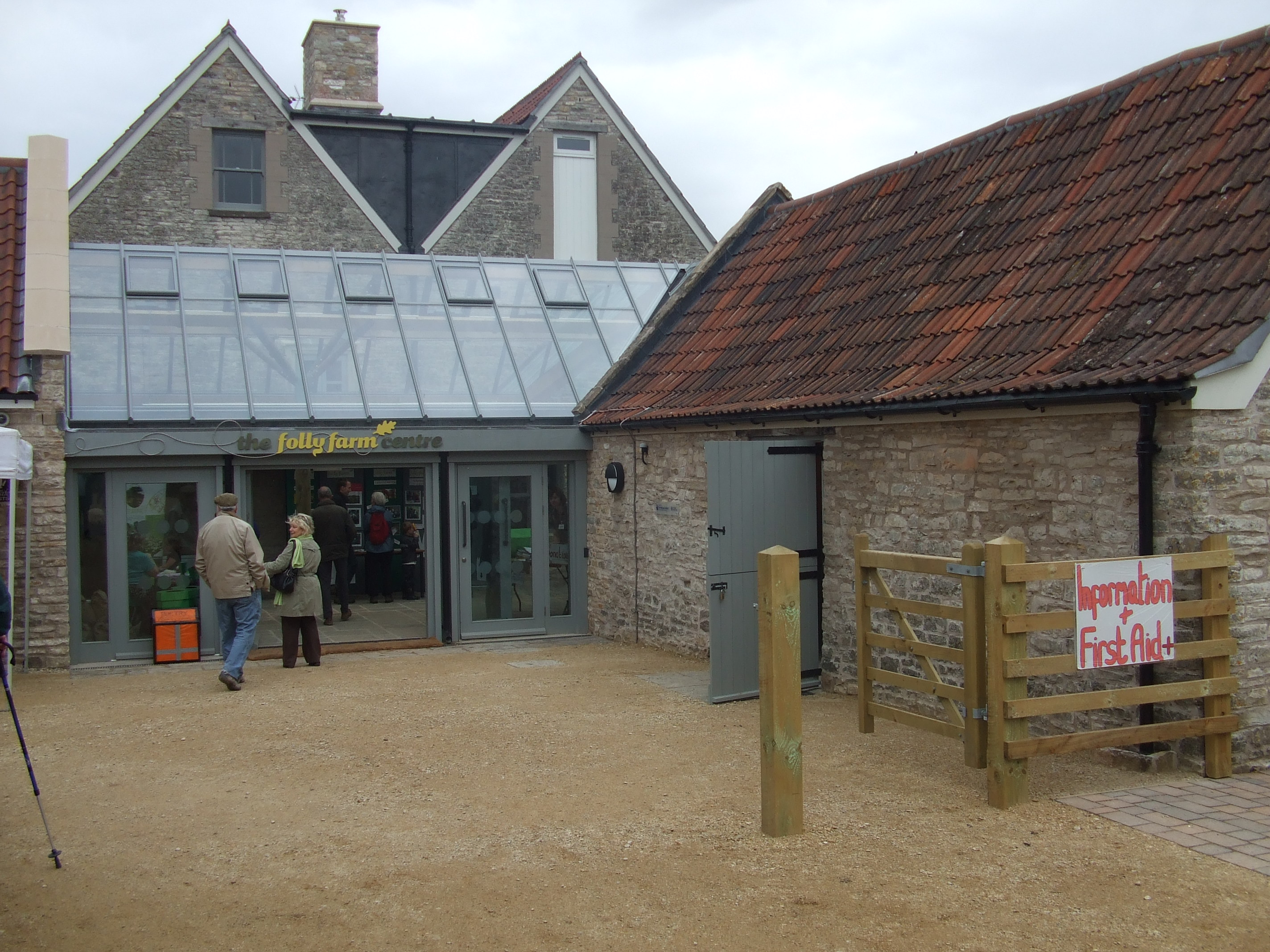
Folly Farm reception

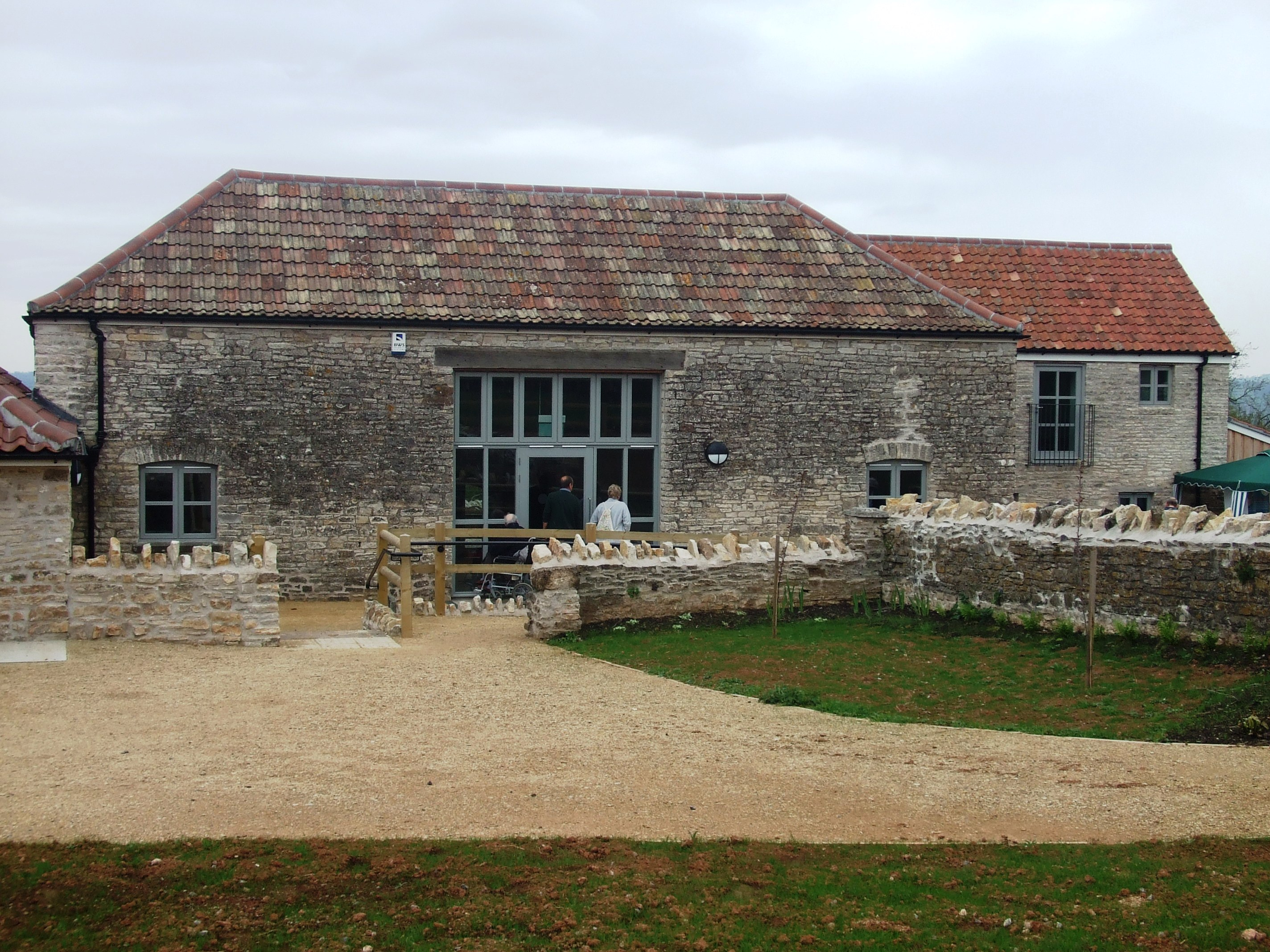
Farm buildings now used for exhibitions

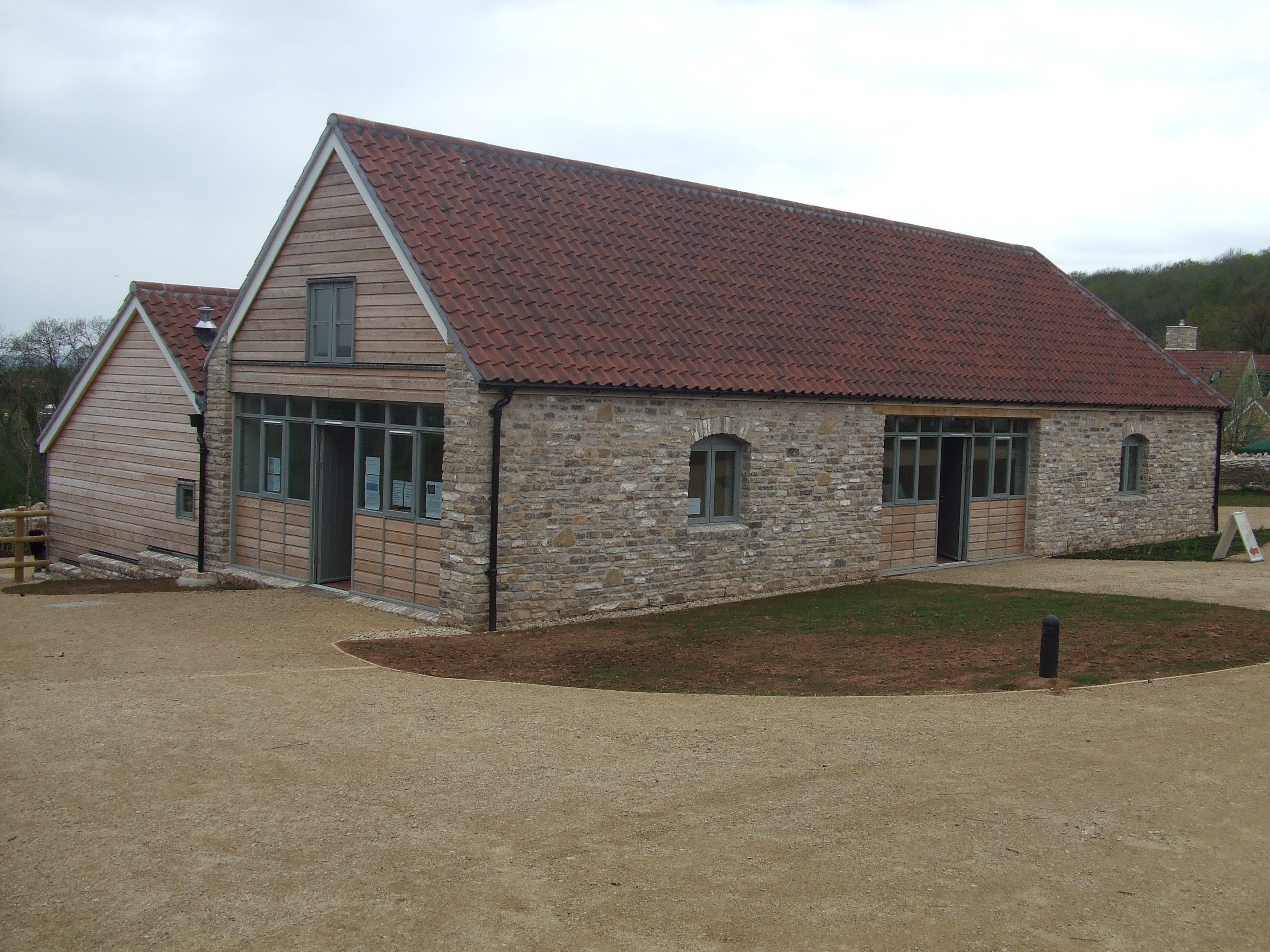
Farm buildings now used for exhibitions
