= Alexander Wedderburn, 1st Earl of Rosslyn =

Scottish lawyer and politician (1733-1805)

The Right Honourable The Earl of Rosslyn PC KC
- Portrait by Sir Joshua Reynolds, 1785

Lord Chancellor (Note: Remained Lord High Chancellor of Great Britain from the Act of Union in January 1801 as the Lord High Chancellor of Ireland remained in office until the Irish Free State (Consequential Provisions) Act 1922.) Lord High Steward for the trial of: List: Warren Hastings
- In office 28 January 1793 – 14 April 1801
- Monarch: George III
- Prime Minister: William Pitt the Younger
- Preceded by: In Commission
- Succeeded by: The Lord Eldon

Attorney General for England and Wales
- In office 1778–1780
- Preceded by: Edward Thurlow
- Succeeded by: James Wallace

Chief Justice of the Common Pleas
- In office 1780–1793
- Preceded by: Sir William de Grey
- Succeeded by: Sir James Eyre

Member of the House of Lords Lord Temporal
- In office June 1780 – 2 January 1805; Hereditary peerage
- Preceded by: Peerage created
- Succeeded by: The 2nd Earl of Rosslyn

Personal details
- Born: 3 February 1733
- Died: 2 January 1805 (aged 71)
- Spouse: Charlotte Courtenay
- Parent(s): Peter Wedderburn, Lord Chesterhall; Janet Ogilvy
- Relatives: James St Clair-Erskine, 2nd Earl of Rosslyn (nephew)

Alexander Wedderburn, 1st Earl of Rosslyn, PC, KC (3 February 1733 – 2 January 1805) was a British lawyer and politician who sat in the House of Commons of Great Britain between 1761 and 1780 when he was raised to the peerage as Baron Loughborough. He served as Lord Chancellor from 1793 to 1801.

== Life ==
Wedderburn was the eldest son of Peter Wedderburn, Lord Chesterhall (a lord of session), and was born at Chesterhall near Dunbar in East Lothian.

He received his initial education at Dalkeith and then the Royal High School, Edinburgh, and matriculated at the University of Edinburgh aged 14. During his studies in Edinburgh he resided at his father's townhouse on Elphinstone Court, south of the Royal Mile, around 200m from the university. He qualified as an advocate serving in Scotland in 1752 aged only 19. He did not see eye to eye with others in the courts and on one occasion felt so insulted at comments on his age that he threw off his gown and never again appeared in the Scottish courts. He instead passed the English bar and went to practice in England, famously acting as counsel to the 1st Baron Clive.

His father was called to the Scottish bench in 1755, and for the next three years Wedderburn returned to Edinburgh, where he employed his oratorical powers in the General Assembly of the Church of Scotland, and passed his evenings in social and argumentative clubs.

In 1755 the precursor of the later Edinburgh Review was started, and Wedderburn edited its two issues. The dean of faculty at this time, Alexander Lockhart (later Lord Covington), a lawyer notorious for his harsh demeanour, in the autumn of 1757 assailed Wedderburn with more than ordinary insolence. Wedderburn retorted with extraordinary powers of invective, and, on being rebuked by the bench, declined to retract or apologise. Instead, he left the court forever.

== Legal career ==
Wedderburn was called to the English bar at the Inner Temple in 1757. To shake off his Scottish accent and to improve his oratory, he engaged the services of Thomas Sheridan and Charles Macklin. He studied the forms of English law in order to secure business and to conduct his cases with adequate knowledge. He solicited William Strahan, a printer, to get him employed in city causes, and he entered into social intercourse with busy London solicitors. His local connections and the incidents of his previous career brought him to the notice of his countrymen Lord Bute and Lord Mansfield.

When Lord Bute was prime minister, Wedderburn used to go on errands for him, and it was he that first suggested to the premier the propriety of granting Samuel Johnson a pension.

Through the favour of Lord Bute, he was returned to parliament for the Ayr Burghs in 1761. In 1763 he became king's counsel and bencher of Lincoln's Inn, and for a short time went the northern circuits, but was more successful in obtaining business in the Court of Chancery. In 1767, he married Betty Anne Dawson, only child and heiress of John Dawson of Marly, Yorkshire who brought him considerable wealth in addition to his own. (Carlyle puts the amount at £10,000)

== Political career ==
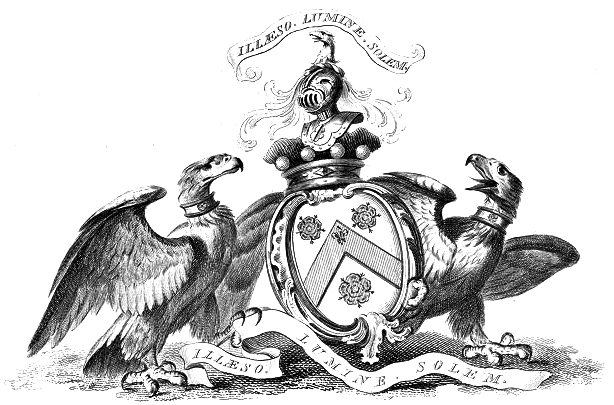
Arms of Alexander Wedderburn (as Baron Loughborough).

When George Grenville, whose principles leaned to Toryism, quarrelled with the court, Wedderburn affected to regard him as his leader in politics. At the dissolution in the spring of 1768 he was returned by Sir Lawrence Dundas for Richmond as a Tory, but in the questions that arose over John Wilkes he took the popular side of Wilkes and liberty, and resigned his seat in May 1769. In the opinion of the people he was now regarded as the embodiment of all legal virtue; his health was toasted at the dinners of the Whigs amid rounds of applause, and, in recompense for the loss of his seat in parliament, he was returned by Lord Clive for his pocket-borough of Bishop's Castle, in Shropshire, in January 1770.

During the next session he acted vigorously in opposition, but his conduct was always viewed with distrust by his new associates, and his attacks on the ministry of Lord North grew less and less animated in proportion to its apparent fixity of tenure. In January 1771 he was offered and accepted the post of solicitor-general. The high road to the woolsack was now open, but his defection from his former path has stamped his character with general infamy. Junius wrote of him, "As for Mr Wedderburn, there is something about him which even treachery cannot trust," and Colonel Barr attacked him in the House of Commons. The new law officer defended his conduct with the assertion that his alliance in politics had been with George Grenville, and that the connection had been severed on his death.

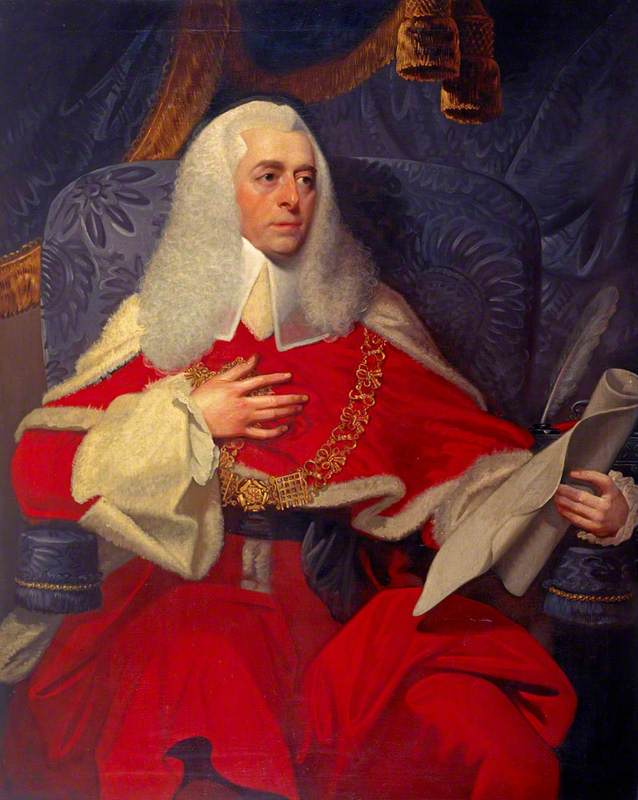
Lord Loughborough, Chief Justice of the Common Pleas

During the American Revolutionary War, Wedderburn consistently renounced the British America colonies. Wedderburn sustained a brackishness concerning Great Britain interests of the Thirteen Colonies and the forthcoming American Revolution. On January 29, 1774, the privy counsellors sponsored a council order tantamount to England's bull-baiting illustrative by Wedderburn's bellicose diatribe towards Benjamin Franklin (and, some historians say, downright slanderous) before the Privy Council in January 1774.

In June 1778 Wedderburn was promoted to the post of attorney-general, and in the same year he refused the dignity of chief baron of the exchequer because the offer was not accompanied by the promise of a peerage. At the dissolution in 1774 he had been returned for Okehampton in Devon, and for Castle Rising in Norfolk, and selected the former constituency; on his promotion as leading law officer of the crown he returned to Bishops Castle. The coveted peerage was not long delayed. In June 1780 he was created Chief Justice of the Common Pleas, with the title of Baron Loughborough.

During the existence of the coalition ministry of North and Fox, the great seal was in commission (April to December 1783), and Lord Loughborough held the leading place among the commissioners. For some time after that ministry's fall he was considered the leader of the Whig party in the House of Lords, and, had the illness of the King George III brought about the return of the Whigs to power, the great seal would have been placed in his hands. The king's restoration to health secured William Pitt The Younger's continuance in office, and disappointed the Whigs. In 1792, during the period of the French Revolution, Lord Loughborough seceded from Fox, and on 28 January 1793 he received the great seal in the Tory cabinet of Pitt. The resignation of Pitt on the question of Catholic emancipation (1801) put an end to Wedderburn's tenure of the Lord Chancellorship, for, much to his surprise, no place was found for him in Addington's cabinet. Pitt's friends believed he had been guilty of treachery over the Emancipation issue; and even the King, who used Loughborough as a spy in Cabinet, later commented that his death removed "the greatest knave in the Kingdom".

== Marriages and later life ==
His first wife died childless in 1781, and the following year he married Charlotte, youngest daughter of William, Viscount Courtenay; her only son died in childhood. Lord Loughborough accordingly obtained in 1795 a re-grant of his barony with remainder to his nephew, Sir James St Clair Erskine. The end of his tenure as Lord Chancellor in 1801 was softened by the grant of an earldom (he was created Earl of Rosslyn on 21 April 1801, also with remainder to his nephew), and by a pension of £4000 per annum. After this date he rarely appeared in public, but he was a constant figure at all the royal festivities. He was elected a Fellow of the Royal Society in 1787 and accepted an honorary vice presidency at London's charitable Foundling Hospital in 1799.

He attended a festive gathering, quite typical for this time in his life, at Frogmore, in December 1804. On the following day he was seized with an attack of gout in the stomach, and on 2 January 1805 he died of an apoplectic fit at his country seat of Baylis, near Salt Hill, Windsor. He was buried in St Paul's Cathedral on 11 January 1805. Rosslyn House and Rosslyn Hill in Hampstead took their names from the Earl.

== Assessment ==
At the bar Wedderburn was the most elegant speaker of his time, and, although his knowledge of the principles and precedents of law was deficient, his skill in marshalling facts and his clearness of diction were marvellous; on the bench his judgments were remarkable for their perspicuity, particularly in the appeal cases to the House of Lords. For cool and sustained declamation he stood unrivalled in parliament, and his readiness in debate was universally acknowledged. In social life, in the company of the wits and writers of his day, his faculties seemed to desert him. He was not only dull, but the cause of dullness in others, and even Alexander Carlyle confesses that in conversation his illustrious countryman was stiff and pompous. In Wedderburn's character ambition banished all rectitude of principle, but the love of money for money's sake was not among his faults.

== Quote ==
Regarding the Thellusson Will Case, the Lord Chancellor stated:

A fortune in circulation, even if spent in luxuries, waste, and dissipation, did more good to the public, and afforded more emulation to industry, and better encouragement to arts and manufactures, than any useless accumulation of money could do.

== See also ==
- Wedderburn baronets, distant relations

== Notes ==
Parliament of Great Britain
Preceded by Lord Frederick Campbell	Member of Parliament for Ayr Burghs; 1761–1768	Succeeded by James Archibald Stuart
Preceded by Sir Ralph Milbanke; Thomas Dundas	Member of Parliament for Richmond; 1768–1769; With: Lawrence Dundas 1774 – Jan 1775; William Norton from Jan 1775	Succeeded by Charles John Crowle; William Norton
Preceded by William Clive; George Clive	Member of Parliament for Bishop's Castle; 1770–1774; With: George Clive	Succeeded by Henry Strachey; George Clive
Preceded by Henry Strachey; George Clive	Member of Parliament for Bishop's Castle; 1778–1780; With: George Clive 1778–1779; William Clive 1779–1780	Succeeded by Henry Strachey; William Clive
Legal offices
Preceded by Edward Thurlow	Solicitor General for England and Wales; 1771–1778	Succeeded by James Wallace
Preceded by Edward Thurlow	Attorney General for England and Wales; 1778–1780	Succeeded by James Wallace
Preceded by Sir William de Grey	Chief Justice of the Common Pleas; 1780–1793	Succeeded by Sir James Eyre
Political offices
Preceded by The Lord Thurlow	Lord High Steward; 1793–1795	Succeeded by —
Preceded by In Commission	Lord High Chancellor of Great Britain; 1793–1801	Succeeded by The Lord Eldon
Peerage of the United Kingdom
New creation	Earl of Rosslyn; 1801–1805	Succeeded by James St Clair-Erskine
Peerage of Great Britain
New creation	Baron Loughborough; 1780–1805	Extinct
New creation	Baron Loughborough; 1795–1805	Succeeded by James St Clair-Erskine
