= John Strachey (geologist) =

British geologist and topographer

- Born: 10 May 1671; Chew Magna
- Died: 11 June 1743 (aged 72); Greenwich
- Known for: stratified rock formations
- Scientific career
- Fields: Geology

John Strachey FRS (10 May 1671 – 11 June 1743) was a British geologist and topographer.

He was born in Chew Magna, England. He inherited estates including Sutton Court from his father at three years of age. He matriculated at Trinity College, Oxford and was admitted at Middle Temple, London, in 1688. He was elected a Fellow of the Royal Society in 1719.

He introduced a theory of rock formations known as Stratum, based on a pictorial cross-section of the geology under his estate at Bishop Sutton and Stowey in the Chew Valley and coal seams in nearby coal works of the Somerset coalfield, projecting them according to their measured thicknesses and attitudes into unknown areas between the coal workings. The purpose was to enhance the value of his grant of a coal-lease on parts of his estate. This work was later developed by William Smith.

In addition to his map making and geological interests he had several other publications including An Alphabetical List of the Religious Houses in Somersetshire (1731).

He had married twice; firstly Elizabeth Elletson, with whom he had 18 children (see picture of 8 of them) and secondly Christina Staveley, with whom he had a further one child. Strachey died in Greenwich, London.

== Homage ==
Strachey Stump, a flat-topped mountain in Antarctica, is named after him.
