= Stowey =

Village in Somerset, England

Coordinates: 51.3346°N 2.5794°W

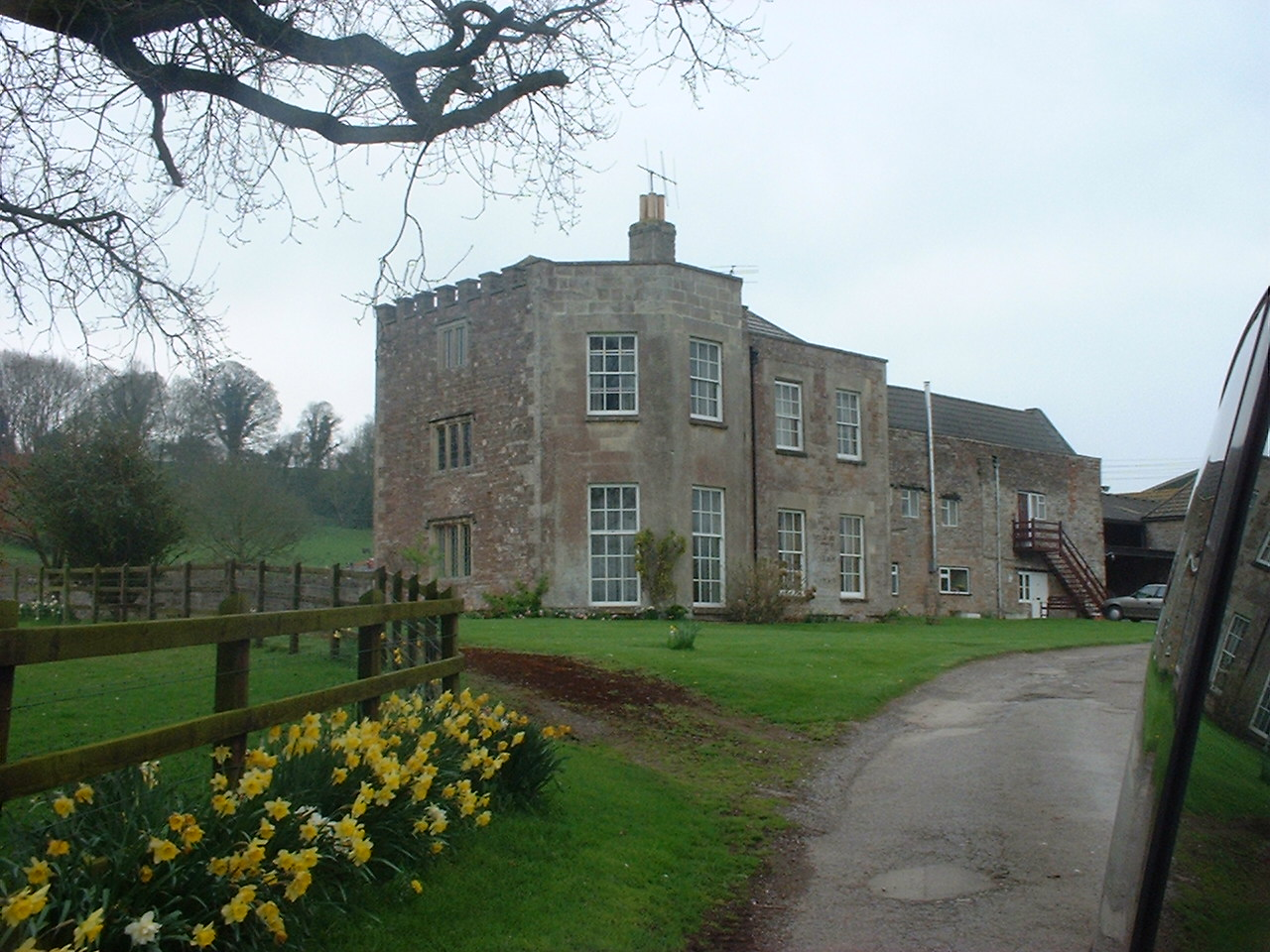
- Stowey House

- Location within Somerset
- Population: approx. 100
- OS grid reference: ST597598
- Civil parish: Stowey Sutton
- Unitary authority: Bath and North East Somerset
- Ceremonial county: Somerset
- Region: South West
- Country: England
- Sovereign state: United Kingdom
- Post town: BRISTOL
- Postcode district: BS39
- Dialling code: 01275
- Police: Avon and Somerset
- Fire: Avon
- Ambulance: South Western
- UK Parliament: North East Somerset and Hanham

Stowey is a small village and former civil parish, now in the parish of Stowey Sutton, in the Bath and North East Somerset district, in the ceremonial county of Somerset, England. It lies within the Chew Valley, south of Chew Valley Lake and north of the Mendip Hills, approximately 10 miles (16 km) south of Bristol on the A368 road Weston-super-Mare to Bath. Stowey and its neighbouring and larger village, Bishop Sutton, form the civil parish of Stowey Sutton.

== History ==
There is some evidence of a possible wooden enclosure from the Iron Age known as Stowey Castle. There is also some evidence of an ochre crushing mill used for making pigment for marking sheep.

During the 16th or 17th century, Stowey was a chapelry of Chew Magna. It had become a separate parish by the 19th century, part of the hundred of Chew. It became a civil parish in 1866. On 1 April 1949 the civil parish was abolished and merged with part of the civil parish of Chew Magna to form the civil parish of Stowey Sutton. In 1931 the parish had a population of 127.

The early Lords of the Manor were the FitzRichard family. In the early 17th century it was held by the Jones family, who held it until 1840 when it was sold to Sir Edward Strachey.

== Government ==
Stowey and Bishop Sutton make up the Stowey Sutton Parish Council, which has some responsibility for local issues, and is part of the Chew Valley South Ward, which is represented by one councillor on the Bath and North East Somerset Unitary Authority which has wider responsibilities for services such as education, refuse, tourism etc. The village is a part of the North East Somerset and Hanham constituency. Prior to Brexit in 2020, it was part of the South West England constituency of the European Parliament.

== Geography ==
Along with the rest of South West England, Stowey has a temperate climate which is generally wetter and milder than the rest of England. The annual mean temperature is about 10 °C (50 °F) with seasonal and diurnal variations, but due to the modifying effect of the sea, the range is less than in most other parts of the United Kingdom. January is the coldest month with mean minimum temperatures between 1 and 2 °C (34 and 36 °F). July and August are the warmest months in the region with mean daily maxima around 21 °C (70 °F). In general, December is the dullest month and June the sunniest. The south west of England enjoys a favoured location, particularly in summer, when the Azores High extends its influence north-eastwards towards the UK.

Cloud often forms inland, especially near hills, and reduces exposure to sunshine. The average annual sunshine totals around 1600 hours. Rainfall tends to be associated with Atlantic depressions or with convection. In summer, convection caused by solar surface heating sometimes forms shower clouds and a large proportion of the annual precipitation falls from showers and thunderstorms at this time of year. Average rainfall is around 800–900 mm (31–35 in). About 8–15 days of snowfall is typical. November to March have the highest mean wind speeds, with June to August having the lightest. The predominant wind direction is from the south west.

There are several sites of Nature Conservation Interest and Special Scientific Interest in and around the village.

=== Folly Farm ===
Near to the village is Folly Farm, a 17th-century farm with traditionally managed, unimproved, neutral grassland, flowery meadows and woodlands with splendid views, run by Avon Wildlife Trust. Folly Farm includes two SSSIs — the meadows (19.36 hectares) and Dowlings Wood (9 hectares).

== Demographics ==
According to the 2001 Census, the Chew Valley South Ward (which includes Bishop Sutton and Stowey), had 1,222 residents, living in 476 households, with an average age of 40.3 years. Of these 76% of residents describing their health as 'good', 25% of 16- to 74-year-olds had no qualifications; and the area had an unemployment rate of 1.9% of all economically active people aged 16–74. In the Index of Multiple Deprivation 2004, it was ranked at 28,854 out of 32,482 wards in England, where 1 was the most deprived LSOA and 32,482 the least deprived.

== Landmarks ==
=== Sutton Court ===
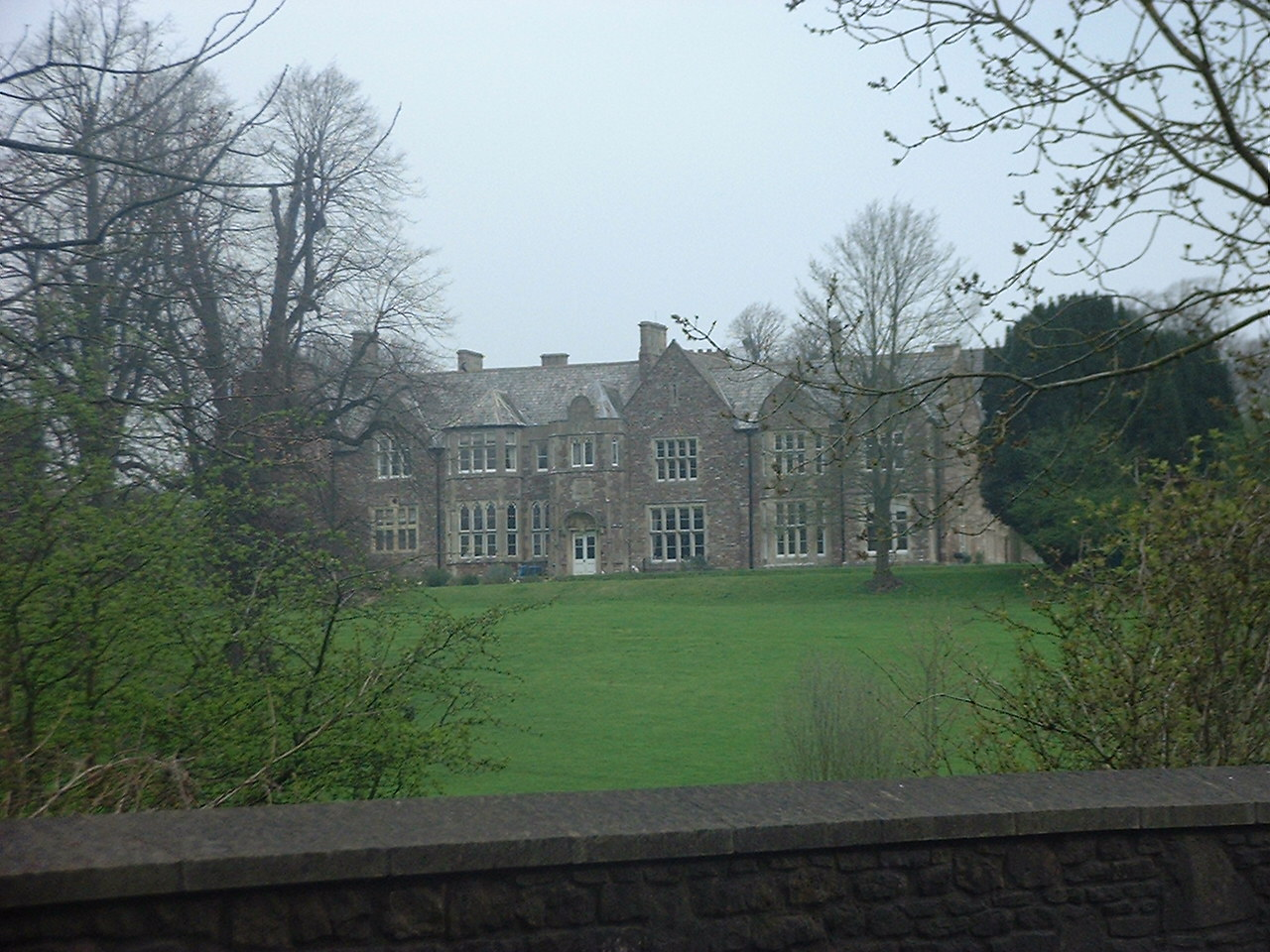
Sutton Court, Stowey

Sutton Court, also known as Stowey Court, is a large house built on the site of a 14th-century castle, with sections built in the 15th and 16th century. About 1558 (former date on a fireplace) Bess of Hardwick and her second husband, Sir William St. Loe, added a north-east wing with a parlour and chapel, which includes Tudor buttresses. The house was then left to her son Charles Cavendish, but later the property passed to the Strachey family. From about 1650–1700 it was the seat of Richard Jones and his son Sir William Jones, the Attorney General of England. Around 1800 it was the seat of the Strachey family including Richard Strachey and his brother John Strachey. Much of the house was remodelled in 1858 by Thomas Henry Wyatt. Life at Sutton Court was described by John St. Loe Strachey in his autobiographical book The Adventure of Living in 1922. It is a Grade II* listed building. A curtain wall to the north of Sutton Court with a gazebo is also listed. The Lodge is also Grade II listed.

=== Stowey House ===
Another significant building in the village is Stowey House to the north-west of the church, which includes original 17th-century gables, but was considerably extended in Georgian times. It is a Grade II listed building.

Stowey House Farm has a farm shop open to the public.

== Church ==
The Church of St Nicholas and St Mary is a Church of England parish church, which dates back to the 15th century, when it was a chapelry of Chew Magna, includes wall paintings by Henry Strachey from 1915. It is a Grade II listed building.

"Stowey" is the name of a hymn tune which was adapted by Ralph Vaughan Williams for "When a Knight Won His Spurs."
