= Edward Strachey, 1st Baron Strachie =

British politician (1858–1936)

The Right Honourable The Lord Strachie PC
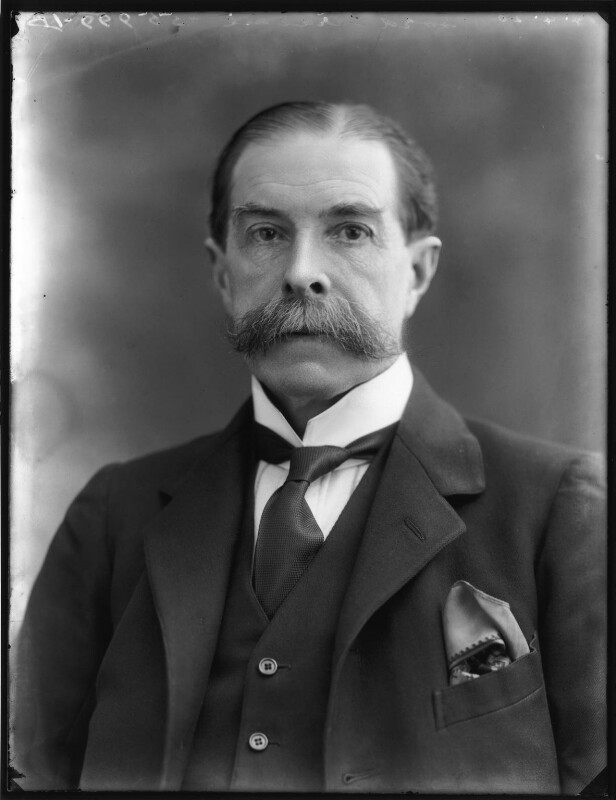

Paymaster General
- In office 23 May 1912 – 25 May 1915
- Monarch: George V
- Prime Minister: H. H. Asquith
- Preceded by: The Lord Ashby St Ledgers
- Succeeded by: The Lord Newton

Personal details
- Born: 30 October 1858
- Died: 25 July 1936 (aged 77)
- Party: Liberal
- Spouse: Constance Braham (m. 1880)

Edward Strachey, 1st Baron Strachie, PC (30 October 1858 – 25 July 1936), known as Sir Edward Strachey, Bt, between 1901 and 1911, was a British Liberal politician. He was a member of the Liberal administrations of Sir Henry Campbell-Bannerman and H. H. Asquith between 1905 and 1915.

== Background ==
Strachey was the eldest son of Sir Edward Strachey, 3rd Baronet, and Mary Isabella (née Symonds). John Strachey, journalist, and Henry Strachey, artist, were his younger brothers and the Labour politician John Strachey his nephew.

== Political career ==
Strachey was returned to Parliament for Somerset South at the 1892 general election, a seat he held until 1911, and served under Sir Henry Campbell-Bannerman and later H. H. Asquith as Treasurer of the Household from 1905 to 1909 and under Asquith as Parliamentary Secretary to the Board of Agriculture and Fisheries from 1909 to 1911. The latter year he was raised to the peerage as Baron Strachie, of Sutton Court in the County of Somerset. In 1912 he was admitted to the Privy Council and appointed Paymaster General, a post he held until 1915. However, he was not offered a ministerial post when the 1915 coalition government was formed, and never returned to political office.

== Family ==
Lord Strachie married Constance, daughter of Charles Bampfylde Braham, in 1880. He died in July 1936, aged 77, and was succeeded in his titles by his son Edward.

Parliament of the United Kingdom
Preceded by Viscount Kilcoursie	Member of Parliament for Somerset South; 1892–1911	Succeeded by Aubrey Herbert
Political offices
Preceded by The Marquess of Hamilton	Treasurer of the Household; 1905–1909	Succeeded by William Dudley Ward
Preceded by None	Parliamentary Secretary to the Board of Agriculture and Fisheries; 1909–1911	Succeeded by The Lord Lucas of Crudwell
Preceded by The Lord Ashby St Ledgers	Paymaster General; 1912–1915	Succeeded by The Lord Newton
Peerage of the United Kingdom
New creation	Baron Strachie; 1911–1936	Succeeded by Edward Strachey
Baronetage of the United Kingdom
Preceded by Edward Strachey	Baronet (of Sutton Court); 1901–1936	Succeeded by Edward Strachey
