= Sir Henry Strachey, 2nd Baronet =

Henry Strachey
- Born: December 6, 1772
- Died: April 11, 1858 (aged 85); Sutton Court, Stowey, Somerset, England

Sir Henry Strachey, 2nd Baronet (December 6, 1772 – April 11, 1858) was a British civil servant in India.

== Life ==
Henry Strachey was born on December 6, 1772, to Henry Strachey (later 1st Baronet) and his wife Jane Kelsall Latham Strachey. As a youth, he attended Westminster School and then Edinburgh University. In 1790, he joined the East India Company and arrived in India a couple of years later. After several years in India, Henry Strachey was appointed Third Judge of the Court of Appeal and Circuit in the Ceded Provinces in 1803. In 1805, he resigned from the service and sailed back to England. In 1810, Strachey's father Sir Henry Strachey, 1st Baronet, died, and Henry Strachey succeeded to the baronetcy and inherited Sutton Court, the family home. The 2nd Baronet became High Sheriff of Somerset in 1832. Like other members of the Strachey family, he befriended literary figures, including Walter Savage Landor. Strachey died at Sutton Court on April 11, 1858.
