= Henry Strachey (artist) =

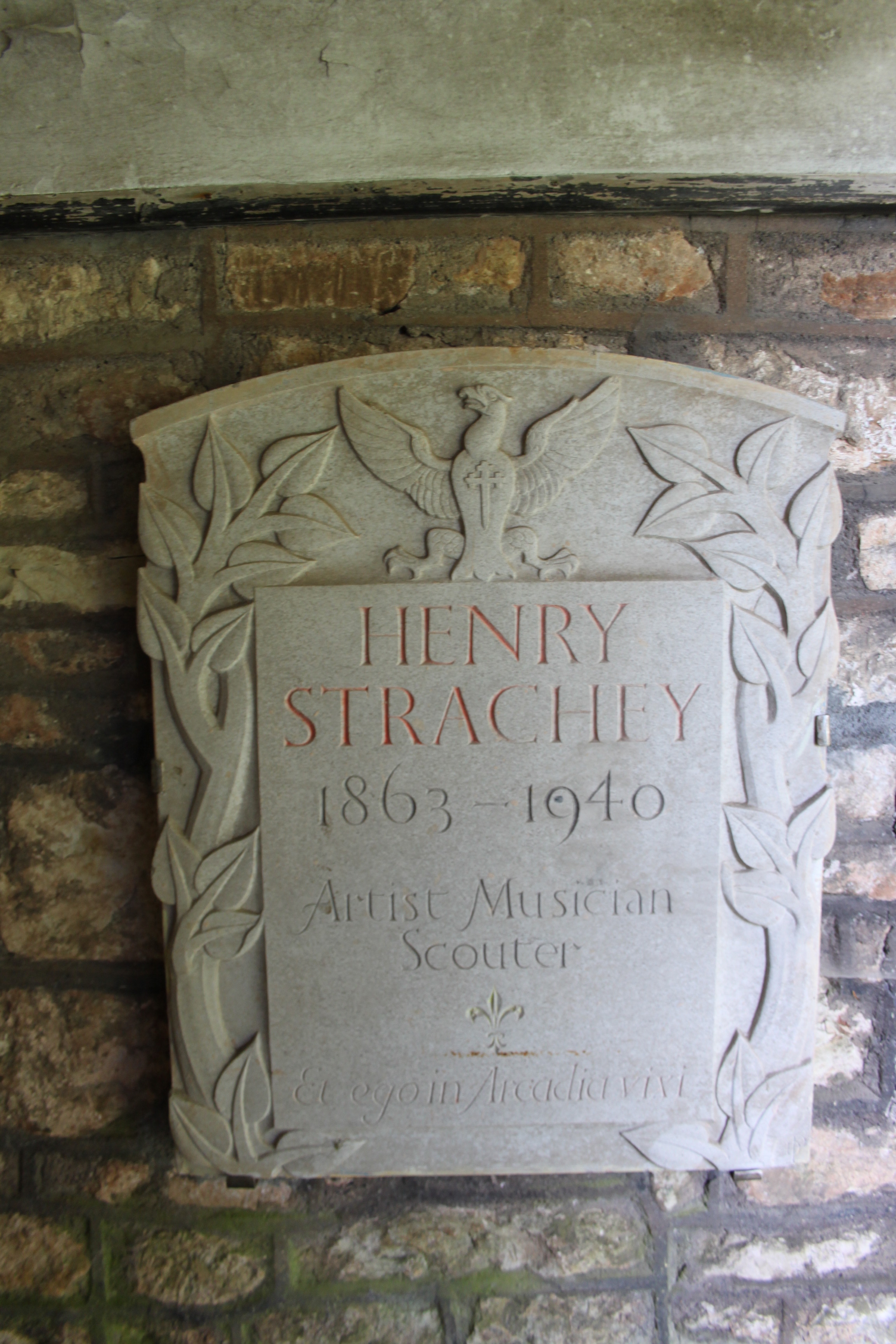
Memorial to Henry Strachey in the Church of St Nicholas and the Blessed Virgin Mary, Stowey

Henry Strachey (1863–1940) was an English painter, art critic and writer.

He was the son of Sir Edward Strachey, 3rd Baronet, and a cousin of Lytton Strachey. He studied at the Slade School of Fine Art in London and exhibited widely between 1888 and 1923 at many galleries and shows, including the Royal Society of Artists in Birmingham (four times), the Grosvenor Gallery, the Walker Art Gallery, Liverpool (twice), the London Salon (eight times), the New English Art Club, the New Gallery (three times) and the Royal Academy of Arts (ten times).

He was an accomplished portrait painter and amongst his subjects, in 1914, was the 7 year old Brenda Capron who is better known under her married name as the artist Brenda Pye.

He executed a series of panels for the County Council's dining room at Brockwell Park in South London, "representing typical scenes of country life : Dawn, with mowers going to work in the field; Noon, two pinafored children by a spray of dog-roses in a field; Evening, the hay in the stack; Afternoon, labourers at tea by the side of a stream; and a large panel of twenty feet or so, the length of the room, showing labourers at work in a wide hayfield."

He was the art critic of The Spectator magazine (1896–1922). He wrote a book on "Raphael" published by G. Bell & Sons, Ltd. London in 1900, which was one of The Great Masters in Painting and Sculpture series edited by G. C. Williamson.

Inside the Church of St Nicholas and the Blessed Virgin Mary, Stowey are wall paintings by Strachey from the early 20th century. There are life-sized representations of St Nicholas and St Mary on either side of the altar. Also in the chancel are paintings of the miraculous Feeding the multitude and of disciples on the road to Emmaus. The Last Judgment is pictured over the chancel arch with an equal number of angels of light and darkness.

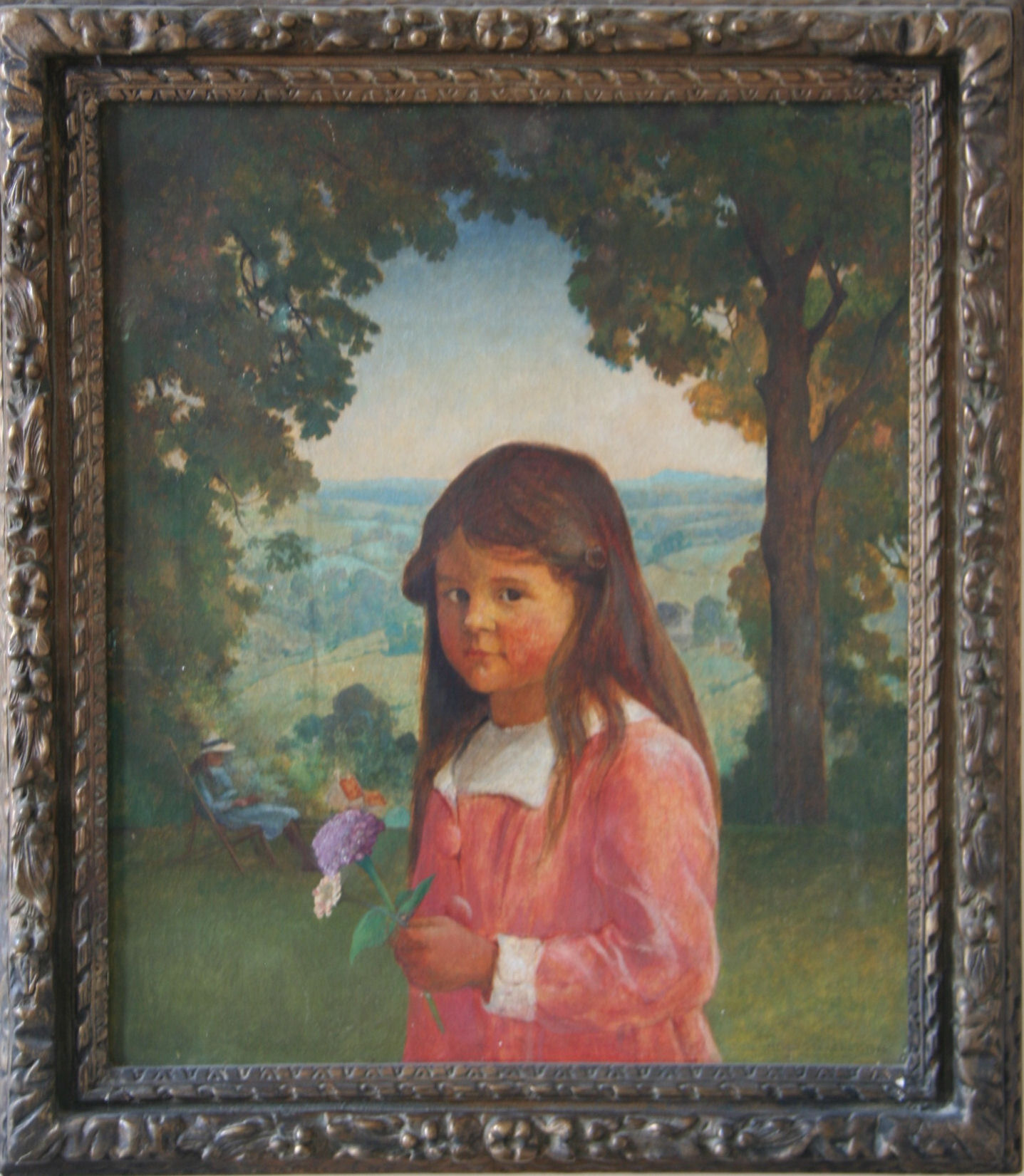
Portrait of Brenda Capron signed and dated "HENRY STRACHEY 1914" (Oil on canvas, private collection)

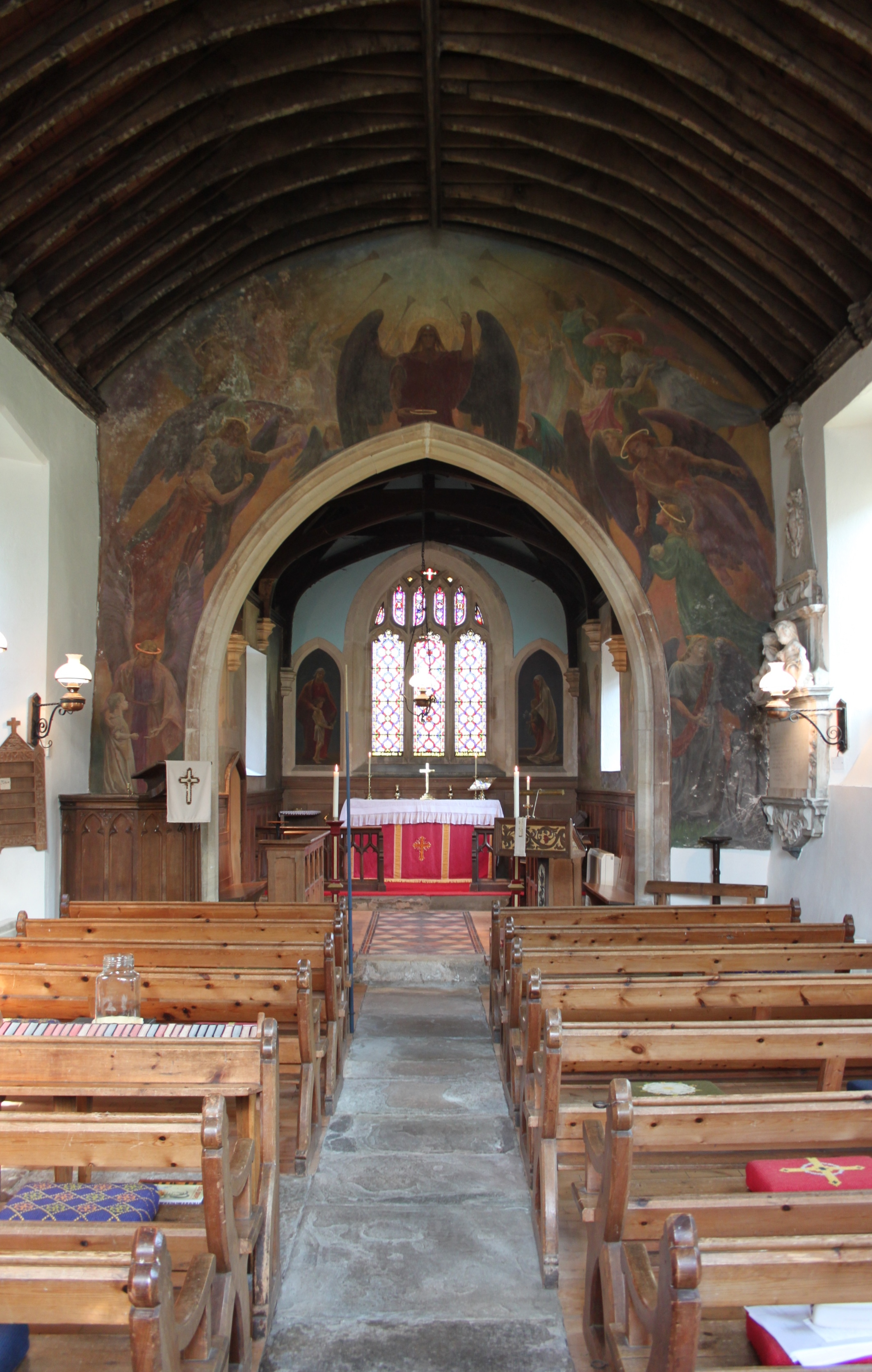
The Last Judgment by Strachey in the Church of St Nicholas and the Blessed Virgin Mary, Stowey
