= W. E. Moll =

The Reverend W. E. Moll
- Born: William Edmund Moll; 1856
- Died: 1932 (aged 75–76)
- Education: Worcester College, Oxford
- Occupations: Cleric; activist
- Political party: Independent Labour Party

Ecclesiastical career
- Religion: Christianity (Anglican)
- Church: Church of England
- Ordained: 1880 (priest)

William Edmund Moll (1856–1932) was an English Anglican priest and Christian socialist activist.

Moll studied at the Worcester College, Oxford, where he became a supporter of the ideas of Henry George. He joined the English Land Restoration League and on graduation joined the Guild of St Matthew. From 1879, he worked as a curate in various parishes in London, also preaching in support of socialism, and from 1884 focused on social activism in Soho. He worked closely with Stewart Headlam, allowing him to conduct mass, and he trained up Charles Marson.

In 1893, Moll joined the new Independent Labour Party (ILP), and relocated to the north of England, soon becoming the vicar of St Philip's Church in Newcastle upon Tyne. There, he trained up three notable socialist curates: Conrad Noel, Paul Stacy, and Percy Widdrington. He was prominent in the Church Socialist League, but turned down the opportunity to become its chair, instead focusing on the ILP, where he served on the National Administrative Council for many years, representing North East England. He campaigned against the Second Boer War, and in support of local coal miners. He was often invited to speak by Methodists in pit villages, despite his strongly contrasting theology.

In religious matters, Moll identified as an Anglo-Catholic, stating that "As a Catholic, I believe that the Church is the Kingdom of Heaven on earth – an organised society for the promotion of righteousness, and freedom, and truth among nations." He argued that God was not to blame for poverty, but rather the belief that accumulation of property was associated with progress. He supported disestablishment, and believed that people should work as individuals to lobby for just laws.

In 1924, Moll relocated to become the vicar at Barnet, and thereafter reduced his activism.

Party political offices
Preceded by William Wood	Independent Labour Party National Administrative Council; Member for the North East; 1908–1920	Succeeded by Jack Lees
