= Tuckett =

Tuckett is a surname and may be:

- Sir Alan Tuckett (born 1948), British adult education specialist
- Angela Tuckett (1906–1994), English solicitor and Communist
- Bob Tuckett (born 1948), Kittian boxer
- Carl Tuckett (born 1970), West Indian cricketer
- Christopher M. Tuckett, British bibal scholar
- Ernie Tuckett (1914–1945), English footballer
- Francis Fox Tuckett (1834–1913), British mountaineer
- Frederick Tuckett (1807–1876), English explorer in New Zealand
- George Elias Tuckett (1835–1900), Canadian politician from Ontario
- Glen Tuckett (born 1927), American baseball coach and athletic director
- Henry A. Tuckett (1852–1918), American hymn writer and poet
- Iain Tuckett, British regeneration and community housing pioneer
- Ivor Lloyd Tuckett (1873–1942), British physiologist
- Joan Tuckett (1895–1957), British solicitor and Communist
- Len Tuckett (1885–1963), South African cricketer
- Lindsay Tuckett (born 1919), South African cricketer
- Will Tuckett (born 1969), English director and choreographer

== See also ==
- Carlon Bowen-Tuckett (born 2004), West Indies cricketer
