= Kenneth Leech =

English Anglican priest and Christian socialist (1939–2015)

The Reverend Kenneth Leech
- Born: 15 June 1939; Ashton-under-Lyne, England
- Died: 12 September 2015 (aged 76); Manchester, England
- Other name: Ken Leech
- Education: King's College, London; Trinity College, Oxford; St Stephen's House, Oxford
- Spouses: Brenda Jordan (m. 1967, divorced); Rheta Wall (m. 1970; div. 1993); Julie Wood (m. 2014)
- Children: 1
- Religion: Christianity (Anglican)
- Church: Church of England
- Ordained: 1964 (deacon); 1965 (priest)
- Writings: True God (1985)
- Congregations served: Holy Trinity, Hoxton; St Anne's, Soho; St Matthew's, Bethnal Green; St Botolph's Aldgate

Kenneth Leech (15 June 1939 – 12 September 2015) was an English Anglican priest and Christian socialist in the Anglo-Catholic tradition.

== Life and career ==
Leech was born into a secular working-class family in Ashton-under-Lyne in greater Manchester. As a teenager he became a Christian and a socialist at the same time. A speech denouncing apartheid at the Free Trade Hall in Manchester in 1956 by Trevor Huddleston, a priest of the Community of the Resurrection who had just returned from South Africa, had a particularly powerful impact on him. He would remember thinking, "If this faith could drive this man to oppose racism with such passion, perhaps it could drive me too."

Leech moved to the East End of London in 1958, where he began his studies for a degree in history at King's College, London. This move, he later wrote, was the real turning point of his life. He graduated with a Bachelor of Arts degree in 1961 and then went to Trinity College, Oxford, from which he graduated in 1964. After theological studies at St Stephen's House, Oxford, he was ordained to the diaconate in 1964 and priesthood in 1965. He served in urban London parishes afflicted by poverty and confronted issues of racism and drug abuse. After ordination, he served as a curate at Holy Trinity, Hoxton in the East End of London (1964-67) and then from 1967 to 1971 at St Anne's, Soho.

While in Soho, Leech set up the Soho Drug Group (1967) which ministered to young addicts, many of whom had been drawn into prostitution. In 1969, at the instigation of and in conjunction with Anton Wallich-Clifford and the Simon Community, he established the charity Centrepoint which became the United Kingdom's leading national charity tackling youth homelessness. From 1971 to 1974 he was chaplain and tutor in pastoral studies at St Augustine's College, Canterbury. In 1974 he became rector of St Matthew's Bethnal Green where he served until 1979. While at St Matthew's he became deeply involved in the struggle against the National Front and other racist and fascist groups. In 1974, with Rowan Williams (who later became the Archbishop of Canterbury) and others, he founded the Jubilee Group, a network of Christian socialists in Britain and across the Anglican Communion, most of whom were Anglo-Catholics. In 1980 he became Race Relations Field Officer for the British Council of Churches Community and Race Relations Unit. The following year he was named Race Relations Field Officer of the Church of England's Board for Social Responsibility. In 1986, Leech helped city broker Richard Lester who founded and funded Centrepoint's first dedicated hostel with over 100 beds in London which they then opened with previous Centrepoint success story Martin Shaw . He was an honorary assistant curate of St Clement's Church, Notting Dale (1982 to 1988), and of St James' Church, Norlands (1985 to 1988). He was director of the Runnymede Trust, a think tank dedicated to promoting ethnic diversity in Britain, from 1987 to 1990. From 1990 until 2004, when he retired from full-time parish ministry, he was community theologian at St Botolph's Aldgate, a church located at the intersection of the City of London and the East End. As archbishop, Rowan Williams awarded him a Lambeth doctorate.

Leech was an advocate of contextual theology. As much as he admired the work of academic theologians, he insisted that authentic Christian theology could not be confined to the academy or to the pastor's study. He believed that it must be grounded in prayer and should be the work of the entire local Christian community across the boundaries of class, race, and sex. At the heart of his faith was what he called "subversive orthodoxy"; the indissoluble union of contemplative spirituality, sacramental worship, orthodox doctrine and social action. He argued that this conjunction of faith and the quest for justice, which points to the coming of the Kingdom of God on earth, is the essential mark of the Christian life and underlies scripture, the teachings of the Church Fathers and the Christian mystical tradition. His work also drew on the radical and even revolutionary strands in Anglo-Catholicism represented by figures such as Stewart Headlam, Thomas Hancock, Charles Marson, Percy Widdrington, Conrad Noel, and Stanley Evans. He respected the contributions of F. D. Maurice, Brooke Foss Westcott, Charles Gore, William Temple, and other reform-minded Anglican Christian socialists, but thought them often to be too timid and middle class.

Although Leech was critical of theological liberalism, unlike some Anglo-Catholics he supported the ordination of women and the rights of gay and lesbian people. His publications include guides to prayer and spiritual direction, autobiographical reflections on urban ministry and theological critiques of capitalism and social injustice. Of his weightiest theological work, True God (published in the United States as Experiencing God), the philosopher Alasdair MacIntyre wrote that "there are few other books that state in so comprehensive a fashion what is at stake in believing or not believing in the God of Catholic Christianity."

Leech died of cancer in Manchester on 12 September 2015.

== Published works ==
=== Books authored ===
- Drugs for Young People: Their Use and Misuse. With Jordan, Brenda. Oxford: Religious Education Press. 1967.
- Pastoral Care and the Drug Scene. London: SPCK. 1970.
- Keep the Faith, Baby: A Close-Up of London's Drop-Outs. London: SPCK. 1973. ISBN 978-0-281-02717-0.
- Youthquake: The Growth of a Counter-Culture Through Two Decades. London: Sheldon Press. 1973. ISBN 978-0-85969-002-7.
- A Practical Guide to the Drug Scene (rev. ed.). London: Sheldon Press. 1974 [1970]. ISBN 978-0-85969-004-1. (Note: This work is a revised edition of Pastoral Care and the Drug Scene, 1970.)
- Soul Friend: A Study of Spirituality. London: Sheldon Press. 1977. ISBN 978-0-85969-113-0.
- True Prayer: An Introduction to Christian Spirituality. London: Sheldon Press. 1980. ISBN 978-0-85969-255-7.
- The Social God. London: Sheldon Press. 1981. ISBN 978-0-85969-342-4.
- What Everyone Should Know About Drugs. Overcoming Common Problems. London: Sheldon Press. 1983. ISBN 978-0-85969-374-5.
- True God: An Exploration in Spiritual Theology. London: Sheldon Press. 1985. ISBN 978-0-85969-388-2. (Note: Also published by Harper & Row in San Francisco with the title Experiencing God: Theology as Spirituality.)
- Spirituality and Pastoral Care. London: Sheldon Press. 1986. ISBN 978-0-85969-520-6.
- Struggle in Babylon: Racism in the Cities and Churches of Britain. London: Sheldon Press. 1988. ISBN 978-0-85969-577-0.
- Care and Conflict: Leaves from a Pastoral Notebook. London: Darton, Longman and Todd. 1990. ISBN 978-0-232-51898-6.
- The Birth of Monster: The Growth of Racist Legislation Since the 1950s. London: Runnymede Trust. 1990. ISBN 978-0-902397-89-7.
- Subversive Orthodoxy: Traditional Faith and Radical Commitment. Toronto: Anglican Book Centre. 1992. ISBN 978-0-921846-49-9.
- The Eye of the Storm: Spiritual Resources for the Pursuit of Justice. London: Darton, Longman and Todd. 1992. ISBN 978-0-232-51993-8. (Note: Also published by HarperSanFrancisco in San Francisco with the title The Eye of the Storm: Living Spiritually in the Real World.)
- We Preach Christ Crucified: The Proclamation of the Cross in a Dark Age. London: Darton, Longman and Todd. 1994. ISBN 978-0-232-52085-9.
- Soul Friend: Spiritual Direction in the Modern World. London: Darton, Longman and Todd. 1994 [1977]. ISBN 978-0-232-52058-3.
- The Sky Is Red: Discerning the Signs of the Times. London: Darton, Longman and Todd. 1997. ISBN 978-0-232-52167-2.
- Drugs and Pastoral Care. London: Darton, Longman and Todd. 1998. ISBN 978-0-232-52182-5.
- Through Our Long Exile: Contextual Theology and the Urban Experience. London: Darton, Longman and Todd. 2001. ISBN 978-0-232-52334-8.
- Race: Changing Society and the Churches. London: SPCK. 2005. ISBN 978-0-281-05653-8.
- We Preach Christ Crucified. New York: Church Publishing. 2005 [1994]. ISBN 978-0-89869-499-4.
- Doing Theology in Altab Ali Park. London: Darton, Longman and Todd. 2006. ISBN 978-0-232-52571-7.
- Prayer and Prophecy: The Essential Kenneth Leech. Edited by Bunch, David; Ritchie, Angus. London: Darton, Longman and Todd. 2009. ISBN 978-0-232-52765-0.

=== Books edited ===
- The Book of the Lover and the Beloved. By Llull, Ramon. Editor. Translated by Peers, E. Allison. London: Sheldon Press. 1978. ISBN 978-0-85969-142-0.
- Christianity Reinterpreted? A Critical Examination of the 1978 Reith Lectures. Editor. Jubilee Lent Lectures. 1979. Penarth, Wales: Church in Wales Publications. 1979. OCLC 6077350.
- Thatcherism. Editor. Jubilee Lent Lectures. 1980. London: Jubilee Group. OCLC 16615398.
- Till All Be Held Common: Christians and the Debate on Common Ownership Today. Editor. Jubilee Lent Lectures. 1981. London: Jubilee Group. 1982. OCLC 977956955.
- Essays Catholic and Radical. Edited with Williams, Rowan. London: Bowerdean Press. 1983. ISBN 978-0-906097-10-6.
- After Marx. Editor. Jubilee Lent Lectures. 1983. London: Jubilee Group. 1984. OCLC 34876833.
- Letters from Seven Churches: Addressed to the Archbishop's Commission on Urban Priority Areas. Edited with Drummond, Terry. Jubilee Lent Lectures. 1984. London: Jubilee Group. 1984. OCLC 23170385.
- The Bible, Racism and Anti-Semitism. Editor. Theology and Racism. 1. London: Board for Social Responsibility. 1985. OCLC 12643532.
- Conrad Noel and the Catholic Crusade: A Critical Evaluation. Editor. London: Jubilee Group. 1993. ISBN 978-0-905595-11-5.
- Setting the Church of England Free: The Case for Disestablishment. Editor. London: Jubilee Group. 2001. ISBN 978-0-905595-13-9.

=== Book chapters ===
- "Stewart Headlam". In Reckitt, Maurice B. For Christ and the People: Studies of Four Socialist Priests and Prophets of the Church of England Between 1870 and 1930. London: SPCK. 1968. ISBN 978-0-281-02255-7.
- "The Christian Left in Britain, 1850–1950". In Ambler, Rex; Haslam, David. Agenda for Prophets: Towards a Political Theology for Britain. London: Bowerdean Press. 1980. ISBN 978-0-906097-08-3.
- "Spirituality and Social Justice". In Leech, Kenneth. The Study of Spirituality. New York: Oxford University Press. 1986. pp. 582–583. ISBN 978-0-19-504169-9.
- "Beyond Gin and Lace: Homosexuality and the Anglo-Catholic Subculture". In Beck, Ashley; Hunt, Ros. Speaking Love's Name: Homosexuality: Some Catholic and Socialist Reflections. London: Jubilee Group. 1988. pp. 16–27. OCLC 19881427. Archived from the original on 5 April 2018.
- "'The Carnality of Grace': Sexuality, Spirituality and Pastoral Ministry". In Woodward, James. Embracing the Chaos: Theological Responses to AIDS. London: SPCK. 1990. pp. 59ff. ISBN 978-0-281-04465-8.
- "The Junkies' Doctors and the London Drug Scene in the 1960s: Some Remembered Fragments". In Whynes, David K.; Bean, Philip T. Policing and Prescribing: The British System of Drug Control. Basingstoke, England: Macmillan. 1991. pp. 35–59. doi:10.1007/978-1-349-11451-1. ISBN 978-0-333-52229-5.
- "Some Light from the Noel Archives". In Leech, Kenneth. Conrad Noel and the Catholic Crusade. London: Jubilee Group. 1993. ISBN 978-0-905595-11-5.
- "Spirituality and Liberation". In Byrne, Peter; Houlden, Leslie. Companion Encyclopedia of Theology. London: Routledge. 1995. pp. 642–664. doi:10.4324/9780203414033. ISBN 978-0-415-06447-7.
- "Introduction". In Leech, Kenneth. Setting the Church of England Free: The Case for Disestablishment. London: Jubilee Group. 2001. ISBN 978-0-905595-13-9.
- "The World Turned Upside Down". In Leech, Kenneth. Setting the Church of England Free: The Case for Disestablishment. London: Jubilee Group. 2001. ISBN 978-0-905595-13-9.
- "The Rebel Church in the Back Streets: Where Are We Now?" In Bradstock, Andrew; Rowland, Christopher. Radical Christian Writings: A Reader. Oxford: Blackwell Publishers. 2002. pp. 328–331. ISBN 978-0-631-22249-1.
- "Evans, Stanley George (1912–1965)". In Matthew, H. C. G.; Harrison, Brian. Oxford Dictionary of National Biography. Oxford: Oxford University Press. 2004. doi:10.1093/ref:odnb/50500. ISBN 978-0-19-861411-1.
- "Groser, St John Beverley (1890–1966)". In Matthew, H. C. G.; Harrison, Brian. Oxford Dictionary of National Biography. Oxford: Oxford University Press. 2004. doi:10.1093/ref:odnb/66048. ISBN 978-0-19-861411-1.
- "Noel, Conrad Le Despenser Roden (1869–1942)". In Matthew, H. C. G.; Harrison, Brian. Oxford Dictionary of National Biography. Oxford: Oxford University Press. 2004. doi:10.1093/ref:odnb/37813. ISBN 978-0-19-861411-1.
- "Williamson, Joseph (1895–1988)". In Matthew, H. C. G.; Harrison, Brian. Oxford Dictionary of National Biography. Oxford: Oxford University Press. 2004. doi:10.1093/ref:odnb/66834. ISBN 978-0-19-861411-1.

=== Journal articles ===
- "What Has Happened to Christian Social Theology?". Theology. 68 (537): 134–139. 1965. doi:10.1177/0040571X6506853704. ISSN 0040-571X. S2CID 171956824.
- "Migration and the British Population, 1955–1962". Race. 7 (4): 401–408. 1966. doi:10.1177/030639686600700407. ISSN 0040-571X. S2CID 143870535.
- "Housing and Immigration, Crisis in London". Race. 8 (4): 329–343. 1967. doi:10.1177/030639686700800401. ISSN 0306-3968. S2CID 154135973.
- "The Hippies and Beyond". The Modern Churchman. 16 (supplement): 82–92. 1972. doi:10.3828/MC.16.0.82. ISSN 0026-7597.
- "The Role of the Voluntary Agencies in the Various Aspects of Prevention and Rehabilitation of Drug Abusers". Addiction. 67 (2): 131–136. 1972. doi:10.1111/j.1360-0443.1972.tb01182.x. ISSN 0965-2140. PMID 4507314.
- "Famine of the Spirit". Theology. 77 (647): 239–241. 1974. doi:10.1177/0040571X7407700503. ISSN 0040-571X. S2CID 147647618.
- "The Resurrection of the Catholic Social Voice". Theology. 77 (654): 630–637. 1974. doi:10.1177/0040571X7407701204. ISSN 0040-571X. S2CID 170669860. (Note: Also published on its own by the Jubilee Group in London with the title The Resurrection of the Catholic Social Voice (ISBN 978-0-905595-00-9).)
- "Believing in the Incarnation". Theology. 79 (668): 68–76. 1976. doi:10.1177/0040571X7607900202. ISSN 0040-571X. S2CID 171038346. (Note: Also published on its own by the Jubilee Group in London with the title Believing in the Incarnation and Its Consequences (ISBN 978-0-85191-089-5).)
- "Spiritual Direction and Psychotherapy". Contact. 61 (1): 13–20. 1978. doi:10.1080/13520806.1978.11759387. ISSN 1352-0806.
- "The Pastor's Problems: I. The Pastor and His Devotional Life". The Expository Times. 91 (12): 356–358. 1980. doi:10.1177/001452468009101202. ISSN 0014-5246. S2CID 170139134.
- "Liberating Theology: The Thought of Juan Luis Segundo". Theology. 84 (700): 258–266. 1981. doi:10.1177/0040571X8108400404. ISSN 0040-571X. S2CID 170400527.
- "First Aid in Pastoral Care: V. Drug Abuse". The Expository Times. 95 (11): 324–328. 1984. doi:10.1177/001452468409501102. ISSN 0040-571X. S2CID 170964833.
- "First Aid in Pastoral Care: XI. Race and Racism". The Expository Times. 96 (5): 132–136. 1985. doi:10.1177/001452468509600502. ISSN 0040-571X. S2CID 141490337.
- "Some Recent Trends in Catholic Social Theology". Theology. 88 (725): 365–374. 1985. doi:10.1177/0040571X8508800505. ISSN 0040-571X. S2CID 147279981.
- "'Diverse Reports' and the Meaning of 'Racism'". Race & Class. 28 (2): 82–88. 1986. doi:10.1177/030639688602800206. ISSN 0306-3968. S2CID 144746357.
- "Dark Night and Revolution: St John of the Cross and Karl Marx". The Modern Churchman. 29 (4): 1–10. 1987. doi:10.3828/MC.29.4.1. ISSN 0026-7597.
- "Thomas Merton as a Theologian of Resistance". Theology. 91 (744): 464–473. 1988. doi:10.1177/0040571X8809100603. ISSN 0040-571X. S2CID 170525313.
- "Was Our Heroin Problem Necessary?". Addiction Research. 5 (2): 79–82. 1997. doi:10.3109/16066359709005251. ISSN 1606-6359.

=== Other ===
- "Area Reports on Cities and Boroughs with Substantial Immigrant Settlements: Stepney (East London)". Institute of Race Relations Newsletter (supplement). London: Institute of Race Relations. November 1964. OCLC 22629914.
- The Drug Subculture: A Christian Analysis. Drug Dependence in Britain. Vol. 3. London: Church Information Office. 1969. ISBN 978-0-7151-6503-4.
- Action for Revival. London: Church Literature Association. 1974. OCLC 491013552.
- Catholic Theology and Social Change. London: Jubilee Group. 1976. ISBN 978-0-905595-02-3.
- Contemplation and Resistance: As Seen in the Spirituality of Thomas Merton. London: Jubilee Group. 1976. ISBN 978-0-905595-03-0.
- The Charismatic Movement and the Demons. London: Jubilee Group. 1976. OCLC 16370978.
- Brick Lane 1978: The Events and Their Significance. Birmingham: AFFOR. 1980. ISBN 978-0-907127-03-1.
- The False Prophets of Reassurance. London: Jubilee Group. 1980. OCLC 499566230.
- "Introduction". In Leicester Consultation. The Church of England and Racism. London: Board for Social Responsibility. 1981. OCLC 25142573.
- Race Today. Race Relations Fieldwork Background Papers. Vol. 2. London: Board of Social Responsibility. 1981. OCLC 31329437.
- Religion and the Rise of Racism. Tawney Memorial Lectures. Vol. 5. Christian Socialist Movement. 1982. OCLC 10127587.
- The Bishops and the Economy: A Jubilee Group Symposium of Responses to the American Roman Catholic Bishops' Pastoral Letter on Catholic Social Teaching and the US Economy. Editor. London: Jubilee Group. 1985. OCLC 29762492.
- Prayer and Prophecy: Some Reflections on the British Urban Scene. Philadelphia: Ascension Press. 1986. OCLC 23148812.
- Silence and Ministry. Oxford: SLG Press. 1987. ISBN 978-0-7283-0118-4.
- Julian Reconsidered. With Ward, Benedicta. Oxford: SLG Press. 1988. ISBN 978-0-7283-0122-1.
- A Question in Dispute: The Debate About an 'Ethnic' Question in the Census. London: Runnymede Trust. 1989. ISBN 978-0-902397-79-8.
- The Radical Anglo-Catholic Social Vision. Discussion Papers (Centre for Theology and Public Issues). Vol. 2. Edinburgh: University of Edinburgh. 1989. OCLC 606104937.
- The Gospel, The Catholic Church and the World: The Social Theology of Michael Ramsey. London: Jubilee Group. 1990. OCLC 28403686.
- The Anglo-Catholic Social Conscience: Two Critical Essays. London: Jubilee Group. 1991. ISBN 978-0-905595-08-5.
- Race, Class and Homelessness in Britain and the USA. Founders' Lectures. Vol. 1993. London: Catholic Housing Aid Society. 1993. ISBN 978-1-897674-04-8.
- Brick Lane 1978: The Events and Their Significance (PDF). London: Stepney Books. 1994 [1980]. ISBN 978-0-9505241-9-1. Archived (PDF) from the original on 28 June 2019.
- "Holy Communists". The Witness. Vol. 77. Episcopal Church Publishing Company. 1994.
- Politics and the Faith Today: Catholic Social Vision for the 1990s. Affirming Catholicism. London: Dartman, Longman and Todd. 1994. ISBN 978-0-232-52080-4.
- Who Will Sound the Trumpet? The Jubilee Group and the Future of the Left. Editor. London: Jubilee Group. 1994. ISBN 978-0-905595-12-2.
- Myers–Briggs: Some Critical Reflections. Editor. London: Jubilee Group. 1996. OCLC 38234278.
- Drugs and the Church: A Background Paper for the Board for Social Responsibility. London: Church of England. 1998. OCLC 41463498. GS Misc. 527.
