= James Adderley =

English cleric (1861–1942)

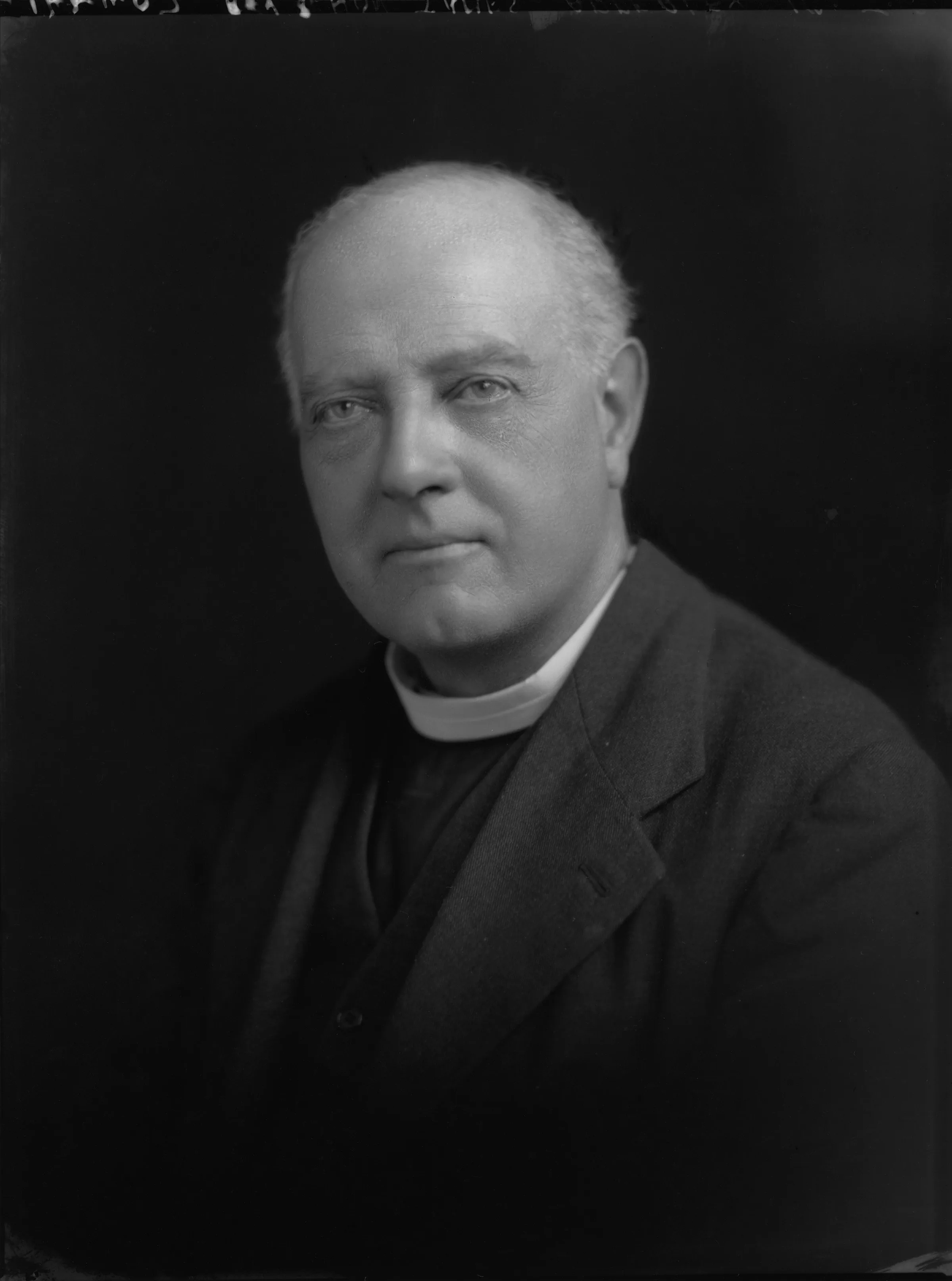
Adderley in 1929

James Granville Adderley (1861–1942) was an English cleric of Anglo-Catholic views, Christian socialist and founder of the Christian Social Union. He was also a ritualist with a strong interest in the dramatic from his student days, seeing it as an effective adjunct to religion.

== Early life ==
He was born at Hams Hall, the fifth son of Charles Adderley, 1st Baron Norton and his wife Julia Anne Eliza Leigh, daughter of Chandos Leigh, 1st Baron Leigh. He was educated at Eton College, and matriculated in 1879 at Christ Church, Oxford, graduating B.A. in 1883. His father was a politician with a long-term interest in religious matters and education, and in 1895 published a book Socialism including his views on the compatibility of Christianity and social reform. Referring to the parish priest Alfred Benjamin Goulden at St Alphege, Southwark, James Adderley wrote in 1916

"[...] it was from dear Father Goulden that I learnt to combine the best in Evangelical religion with the best in Catholicism, or rather to know that they are not two religions, but one, if rightly understood.

== East End of London ==
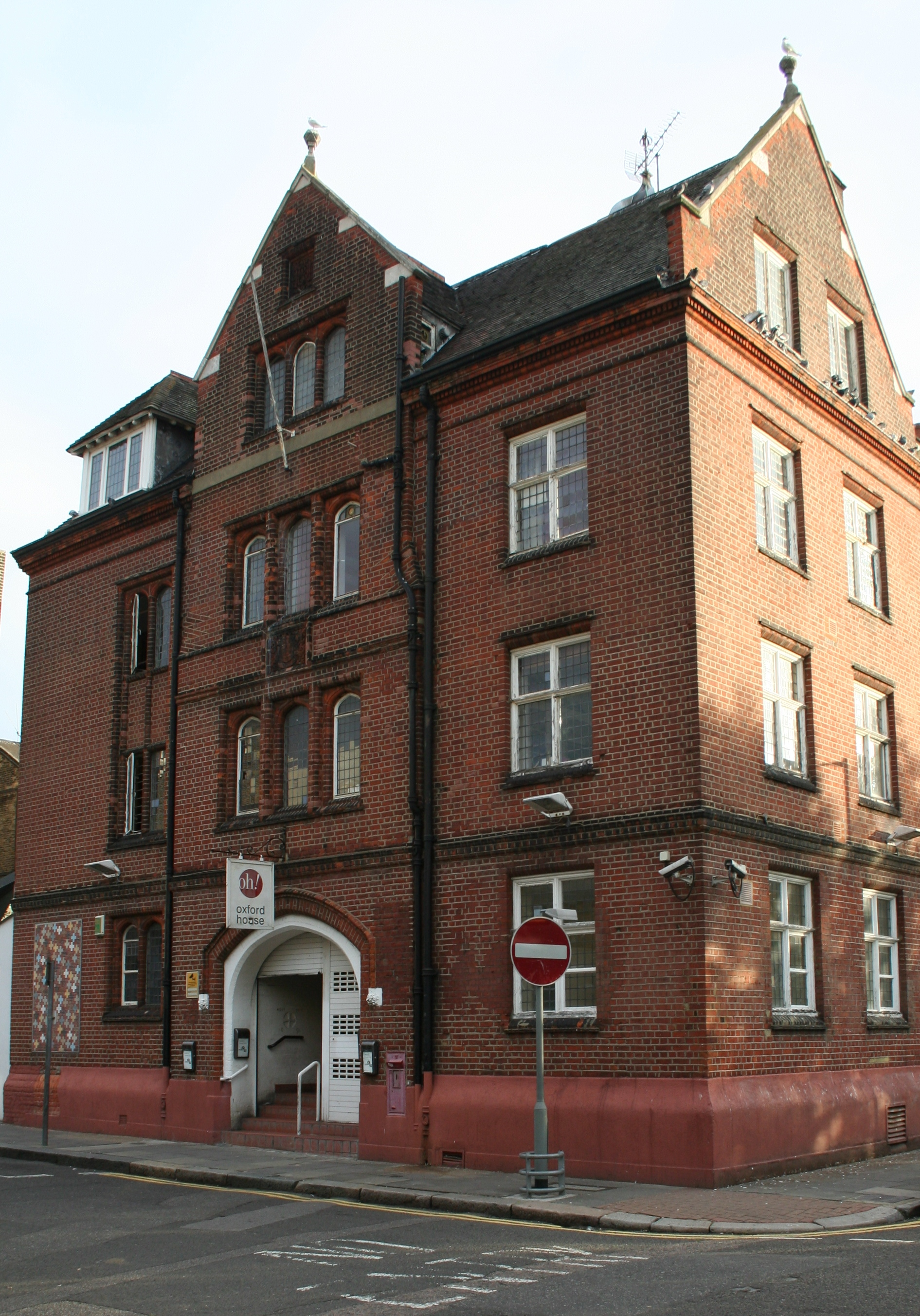
Oxford House, Bethnal Green, 2009 photograph

In 1883 Adderley heard Samuel Barnett on the absence of the "leisured class" in East London. In 1885 he became the head of the Oxford House settlement in London's Bethnal Green, the first full-time Warden to occupy that post. His introduction to the area and its poverty came through the Rev. William E. Jackson, who in 1885 moved from a parish in Everton, Liverpool to become a curate at St Andrew, Bethnal Green. Adderley's successor in 1887 was Hensley Henson, then a deacon. That year Adderley was a soapbox orator at Victoria Park, Tower Hamlets, a role that became customary at Oxford House to 1899.

Having consulted Edward White Benson, a friend of his father and Archbishop of Canterbury, Adderley entered the Church of England. He was ordained deacon in 1887. As a curate he was at Bethnal Green, and then became head that year of the Christ Church Mission in Poplar, until 1893. He was ordained priest in 1888, and joined the Guild of St Matthew of Stewart Headlam, after chancing on one of its meetings, adopting its socialist views. He later resigned from the Guild, in 1895, over support Headlam gave to Oscar Wilde. In his mission role Adderley raised funds for St Frideswide, Poplar (built 1914, in existence to 1947), and the Central London Cemetery.

=== Christian Social Union ===
In 1889 Adderley was one of the founders of the Christian Social Union (CSU), which has been defined as a "moderate socialist" group. The same year, Lux Mundi was published, a book of Christian essays, with theme "the religion of the incarnation"; and of its authors many took part in "the revival of Christian moral philosophy in Oxford", and "shared the practical social commitment which was its counterpart, and which was embodied in the Christian Social Union". A particular connection to Adderley was that William James Heathcote Campion (1851–1892), the secretary of Oxford House, was one of the authors.

Adderley was active in the 1889 London dock strike that started in the summer of that year. His work on fundraising and relief was noted: by Henry Liddon in a letter to Adderley; by a vote of thanks at dock gates after Celestine Edwards had spoken; and by Ben Tillett in his memoirs.

An anonymous article of 1894 in The Quarterly Review on the CSU was written by Hensley Henson. In it he wrote:

The theologian of the Union is ... the Bishop of Durham. The prophet is one of the most eloquent of English preachers, Canon Scott Holland; the philosopher ... Mr. Charles Gore, of 'Lux Mundi' fame; the missionaries are a host of young clerics, of whom Mr. J. Adderley may be taken as the type, and in some sense the leader.

The CSU produced a range of publications: the Economic Review, of which early on Campion was an editor; Goodwill, to which Adderley contributed; and The Commonwealth (1896), for which he found George Herbert Davis as a backer. Percy Dearmer became London secretary of the CSU in 1891; with Edward R. Pease, secretary of the Fabian Society, he put Davis up for election there in 1892. Dearmer, a friend from Oxford, also supported Adderley's mission work at Poplar.

In 1896, when The Commonwealth was launched, Davis was a solicitor involved on the editorial side with Adderley, Dearmer and Holland; he also owned and financed it in its first year. Both Dearmer, Adderley's assistant at Berkeley Chapel, and Davis, ordained priest in 1903, and still a Fabian Socialist in 1905, were closely involved with Adderley's later clerical career.

=== Society of the Divine Compassion ===
In August 1893 Adderley wrote in The English Illustrated Magazine an article "Is Slumming Played Out?", in which he claimed

The fashionable slumming of eight years ago is given up as a wholesale practice.

Attached as curate to All Hallows, Barking (1893–4), he met Henry Hardy (Father Andrew). He was at St Andrew's Church, Plaistow from 1894 to 1897. In 1898, according to Who's Who, he was "working with a small community of Brothers of Mercy." This was the Society of the Divine Compassion (SDC), of which he was a founder in 1894 with Hardy and Henry Chappel (died 1915), after a retreat at Pusey House, Oxford. Adderley in fact left the Society in 1897. Petà Dunstan argues that his novel Stephen Remarx advocated for third order members ("friars") rooted in local communities rather than an institution. Later Brother Giles (Edward Kelley Evans) of the SDC was influenced by Adderley's vision, and adopted his practice of "road missions" to meet wayfarers on equal terms.

Adderley wrote a preface to East End Idylls (1897), a short story collection by Arthur St John Adcock about the London slums influenced by Arthur Morrison. In it he regarded the East End of London as "a uniquely important subject even if people are tired of hearing about it."

== London West End ==
Adderley moved on, hiring the private Berkeley Chapel in Mayfair in which to hold services ("officiates, some would say, performs", according to The Freethinker). Percy Dearmer worked there as an assistant, without an official position. Around 1898 Adderley met at the Chapel John Hawes, unable to become a missionary in Africa for health reasons. Adderley influenced him in the directions both of Christian socialism, and Franciscan ideals. Hawes in particular read at Adderley's suggestion Paul Sabatier's biography of Francis of Assisi. Hawes was at that time an architect, and Adderley used him for some church work.

Vicar of St Mark's Church, Marylebone from 1901, Adderley had George Ratcliffe Woodward as curate there from 1903. He brought in speakers who reflected modern theology and scholarship (S. R. Driver and William Sanday), but also heterodox and progressive views (George Lansbury, Oliver Lodge, Vale Owen, Maude Royden). Woodward was, however, out of sympathy.

== Saltley ==
Adderley was vicar of St Saviour's Church, Saltley from 1904 to 1909. This was the church built for his father, on the family estate in Birmingham. In 1908 he joined the Church Socialist League. It had been formed in 1906. Adderley was one of its leaders in the Birmingham area, with Arnold Pinchard who was vicar at St Jude's Church, Birmingham from 1896 to 1920. Conrad Noel in his autobiography wrote of "Father Adderley, a vicar in Birmingham, and Father Pinchard of St. Jude's in that same city, who was one of Barry Jackson's most valuable supporters".

In a 1912 newspaper story, referring to his Saltley period, Adderley was quoted on why he once sought a curate, "Tory preferred":

I thought it good to provide [the St Saviour's congregation] with a Tory, as I had three Independent Labour Party curates.

George Herbert Davis was a curate at St Saviour's 1904–5 and 1907–9. In a local Board of Guardians election for Aston, Birmingham, he was in 1908 nominated a candidate by the Socialist Party of Great Britain, losing out to the Liberal Unionist candidate. After two years as a licensed preacher in the diocese of Birmingham, he moved in 1911 to Hereford Cathedral as an assistant vicar choral. He was a suffragist campaigner, and his wife Ethel May Davis was the local Women's Social and Political Union secretary; they are now commemorated by a "violet plaque". Articles by Davis in 1912 on The Book of Genesis, in the Monthly Paper of the Church League for Women's Suffrage, caused controversy.

In 1908, Adderley took on John Hawes, by then ordained in the Church of England, as a curate at Saltley. Hawes left for The Bahamas in 1909.

== Later life ==
In 1911 Adderley moved living, within the Birmingham area, to St Gabriel's Church, Deritend. From 1913 to 1918 he was an honorary canon of St Philip's Cathedral, Birmingham. For a Good Friday service of evensong in 1917 at the cathedral, led by Hamilton Baynes, Adderley preached in the open air in the churchyard.

In November 1917 Adderley let it be known that he intended to move to a position as curate to Reginald John Campbell, at the cathedral since 1915, at Christ Church, Broadway, where Campbell was appointed a licensed preacher; it was an early Victorian church built in what was then a slum district. In the event, he was in 1918 appointed by Herbrand Russell, 11th Duke of Bedford to St Paul's, Covent Garden, where he stayed to 1923. From 1923 he was vicar of St Anne, Highgate.

== Works ==
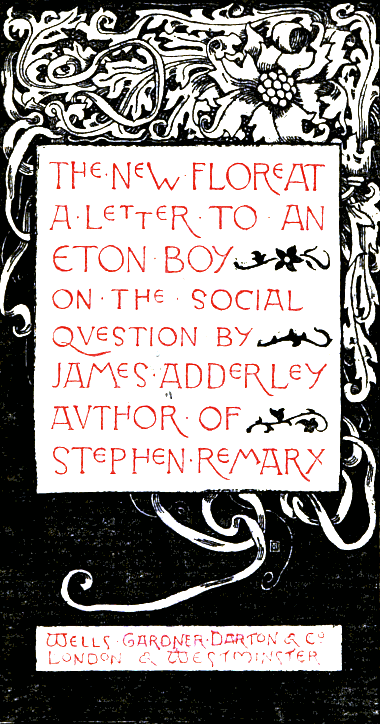
Title page from The New Floreat: A Letter to an Eton Boy on the Social Question (1894)

- The Fight for the Drama at Oxford (1888), introduction by William Leonard Courtney. Addersley's own account of his successful campaign in 1883–4 for the revival of academic drama at the University of Oxford. He worked with Arthur Bourchier, founding a Philothespian Society and persuading Benjamin Jowett, the Vice-Chancellor of Oxford, to lift a ban on student acting. The Oxford University Dramatic Society was founded in 1884.
- Stephen Remarx (1893), called a "strange little novel" by H. Gustav Klaus. Gilbert Clive Binyon wrote in 1931 that it "has been very widely influential", with a 12th edition in 1904. It was a "heavily autobiographical story". It has been called "a modern tract setting forth the "Social Gospel" in the form of fiction."
- Salvation by Jesus, an address to a penitent soul (1893), anonymous
- The New Floreat: A Letter to an Eton Boy on the Social Question (1894). An epistolary novel in the context of the 1889 London dock strike.
- Looking Upward: Papers introductory to the study of social questions from a religions point of view (1896)
- Behold the Days Come: A Fancy in Christian Politics (1907). The Saturday Review wrote: "To Mr. Adderley the Church appears the only adequate organisation for carrying out the dreams of Socialism. He goes further; he identifies Christianity and Socialism."
- A New Earth: Sermons, Addresses and Lectures (1903)
- Is Socialism Atheism?: A Prejudiced Answer (1910)
- In Slums and Society: Reminiscences of Old Friends (1916)
