= Doris Kathleen Flinn =

British artist

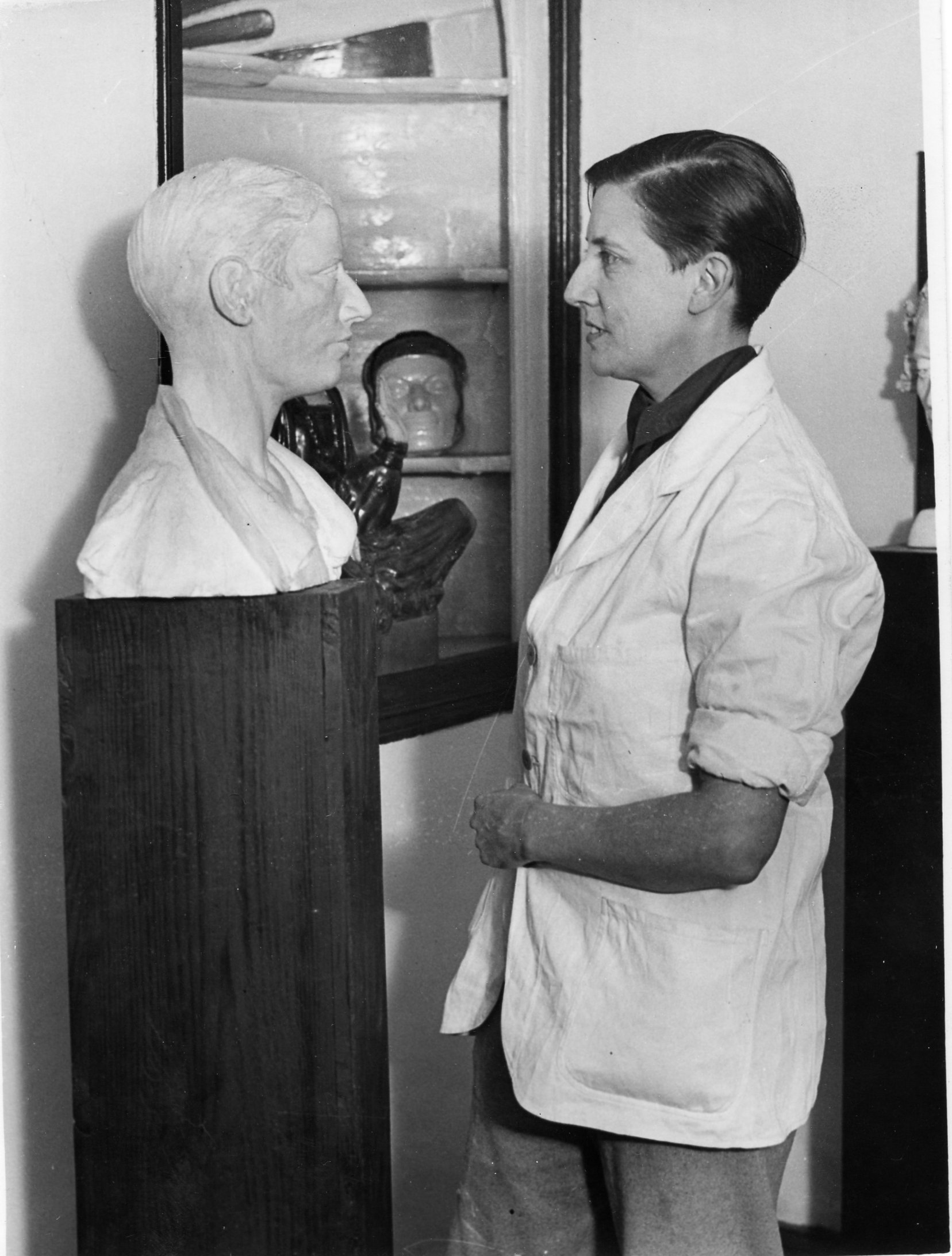
- Flinn c. 1935 with self portrait bust
- Born: 15 October 1892; Chorlton-cum-Hardy, Lancashire
- Died: 19 September 1977 (Aged 84); East Dundry, Bristol
- Education: Manchester School of Art
- Known for: Sculpture

Doris Kathleen Flinn (15 October 1892 - 19 September 1977) was an English sculptor.

== Biography ==
Doris Kathleen Flinn was born at 12 Oak Avenue, Chorlton-cum-Hardy, Lancashire, on 15 October 1892, the daughter of Arthur Flinn (b. ca. 1858), an agent for a silk merchants, and Martha Hannah Barton.

In 1911, Flinn moved to Manchester and from 1914 to 1920 she studied at Manchester School of Art, living at 1 King's Road Alexandra Park, Manchester, and was a member of the Manchester Academy of Fine Arts.

She met Joan Tuckett (1895-1957) by 1917. Tuckett was one of the first female solicitors in Bristol. By 1920 Flinn moved to Bristol. Both Flinn and Tuckett were active Communists and friends with Doris Brabham Hatt and Margery Mack Smith. Flinn and Tuckett were also international hockey players and trained as pilots. The plaster model for a portrait head of Tuckett made by Flinn in 1925 is now at the Bristol Museum. In 1935 Flinn sculpted "Lawyer, Athlete, Aviator, Woman", a piece about Tuckett.

By 1923, Flinn was living at 5 Beaufort Buildings, Clifton, Bristol, Tuckett's family home, and ran a sculpture studio in Boyce's Avenue, Clifton, Bristol. In the early 1920s Flinn worked on some of the carvings for the Wills Memorial Building. In 1930 the couple purchased The Rookery, a large stone-built XVIII century house at East Dundry, Bristol, where they lived there together until Tuckett's death in 1957. Flinn continued to live at The Rookery until her death in 1977.

== Works ==
- The Warrior
- Torso
- Decorative Mask
- Self-Portrait
- Sostenuto
- Lawyer, Athlete, Aviator, Woman, 1935
- Rest
- Salome (1920) (Presumed) £5 5s. (£213 in 2025 sterling)
- Meditation (1922) (Presumed) £25 (£1,228 in 2025 sterling)
- Mother and Child (1922) (Presumed) £1 10s (£54 in 2025 sterling)
- Portrait (1923) (Presumed)
- Desolation (1923) (Presumed) £35 (£1,830 in 2025 sterling)
- Portrait (1924) (Presumed)
- The Bargain (1925) (Presumed) £6 6s (£347 in 2025 sterling)
- A Warrior (1926) (Presumed) £6 (£317 in 2025 sterling)
- Enigma (1926) (Presumed)
- R. C. Tuckett, Esq. (1927) (Presumed)
- Puritan Girl (1927) (Presumed) £2 2s (£119 in 2025 sterling)
- A Warrior (1928) (Presumed)
- Bacchus (1928) (Presumed)
- The Caretaker's Daughter (1928) (Presumed)
- Mother and child (1928)
- Meditation (1928)
- Brigid (1936)
- Lawrence Ogilvie (1930s) neighbour of Doris Flinn
- Mermaid (1936)

== Exhibitions ==
- 75th Annual Exhibition of the Royal West of England Academy, 1920
- 77th Annual Exhibition of the Royal West of England Academy, 1922
- 78th Annual Exhibition of the Royal West of England Academy, 1923-4
- 79th Annual Exhibition of the Royal West of England Academy, 1924
- 80th Annual Exhibition of the Royal West of England Academy, 1925-1926
- Manchester Art Gallery, Exhibition of Work by Manchester Artists, 1926 (The Warrior)
- 81st Annual Exhibition of the Royal West of England Academy, 1926-1927
- 82nd Annual Exhibition of the Royal West of England Academy, 1927-1928
- Royal Society of Artists, Birmingham Spring Exhibition, 1928 (The Caretaker's Daughter)
- 102nd Exhibition of the Royal Scottish Academy of Painting, Sculpture and Architecture, 1928 (Multiple works)
- Manchester Academy of Fine Arts, 75th Spring Exhibition, 1934 (Torso)
- Manchester Academy of Fine Arts, 76th Spring Exhibition, 1935 (Rest)
- Royal Academy of Arts, Summer Exhibition, 1935 (Bridgid)
- 110th Exhibition of the Royal Scottish Academy of Painting, Sculpture and Architecture, 1936 (Mermaid)
