= Charles Marson =

Charles Latimer Marson (16 May 1859 – 3 March 1914) was an influential figure in the second wave of Christian socialism in England in the 1880s. Later between 1903 and 1906 he collaborated with his good friend Cecil Sharp in the collection and publication of Folk Songs from Somerset vols. 1-3, which contributed greatly to the first British folk revival.

== Education and training ==
Marson's formative years were spent in Clevedon in Somerset where his father was the vicar of St Andrew's Church from 1871 till his death in 1895. Marson attended Clifton College and then University College, Oxford. Brought up as a strict evangelical, he lost his faith initially but found new direction when working as a volunteer (and then as a curate) under the Rev Samuel Barnett at St Jude's Whitechapel between December 1881 and April 1884.

This close engagement with East End poverty – the overcrowded and squalid housing, the casual and ‘sweated’ labour, the workhouses and the inadequate charity provision – affected Marson deeply and led him to Christian socialism. He was inspired by the various clubs and schemes at work in the parish – e.g. adult education classes, Mothers’ meetings, youth clubs, work placements. Barnett was at that time developing his ideas of the University Settlement, where students would live and work alongside the poor. The first of these settlements was Toynbee Hall, founded at St Jude's in 1884.

== Journalism and writing ==
While at Whitechapel, Marson began writing articles and reviews for the Pall Mall Gazette and was offered a job (which he declined) alongside William Thomas Stead and Edward Tyas Cook on its staff. His acerbic wit and easy facility with words ensured a steady stream of work with various publications throughout his clerical career, supplementing his modest stipend.

In September 1884 Marson took over as Editor of the Christian Socialist monthly newspaper. This networking tool of the burgeoning socialist groups provided political comment, notices of public meetings, reviews of books and pamphlets etc. Its circulation increased markedly under Marson's leadership until he relinquished the role in December 1886.

It was during this time that Marson developed a close friendship with Edith Nesbit, who submitted some of her early poems to his paper. Marson practised his children's stories with Nesbit's children and he collaborated with her in one of her short stories Man-size in Marble. He was to publish his own original children's stories in 1891 in Australia.

It was through Edith Nesbit that Marson joined the Fabian Society in November 1885. He remained a member until 1913.

== Christian Socialist Groups ==
Marson met the radical priest Rev Stewart Headlam in the early 1880s and quickly joined the Guild of St Matthew, which Headlam had started in 1877. The Guild is regarded by many as the first socialist group of all. Initially the Guild chided the established church for its complacency and reluctance to tackle social issues. It particularly espoused Anglo-Catholic ritual (sacraments, vestments, drama, stained glass) as the better way to reach out to the poor and illiterate. From 1884 through its monthly newspaper The Church Reformer, the Guild promoted a single tax on land values (as advocated by the American Henry George) to fund a campaign against poverty and city slums. Marson joined the Guild's Council and was both supportive and critical of the Guild's progress until its demise in 1909.

In late 1885 Marson founded the Christian Socialist Society with the help of two laymen, WHP Campbell and the Fabian Alfred Howard. Its manifesto, published in May 1886, appealed to a broader base of inter-denominational clergy and lay people alike. After initial success, the Society faltered when Marson left for Australia in 1889 and it folded in 1892.

When the Christian Social Union was started in 1889, Marson was prepared to preach sermons and write articles for its publication ‘Commonwealth’ but felt that, though it claimed a membership of 5,000 and counted many bishops among its members, it was a ‘milk and water’ organisation.

He preferred to put his weight behind the Christian Socialist League, another attempt (in 1894) at an ecumenical socialist group led by the Baptist John Clifford. Marson served on the Executive until its demise in 1898.

The final group that Marson joined was the Church Socialist League (1909–23). Although it drew most of its support from the north of England, Marson knew several of its leaders well – W. E. Moll (with whom he had worked at a Soho parish); Conrad Noel and Percy Dearmer (personal friends); and Percy Widdrington (Marson's private pupil in 1896).

These various Christian Socialist groups ran parallel to secular groups like Henry Hyndman's Social Democratic Federation (1881), William Morris's Socialist League (1884) and the Fabian Society. It is debatable first how successful the Christian Socialists were in effecting changes of attitude and policy within the Church. Rev Percy Widdrington, looking back in 1945, wrote: ’The poverty of the people and the degradation which resulted from it were the motives that impelled us to action. To expect any move from the official Church would have been fantastic. It was as complacent and smug as the rest of society.' Secondly it can be argued that because of their failure to engage with the trades unions and the working man, these Christian Socialist groups never received enough credit for their contribution to the intellectual debates of the late Victorian era, especially when the Labour Party broke through in the General Election of 1906.

== Clerical career ==
Largely because of his outspoken socialist views, Marson led a chequered career within the Church of England. Ill health due to his chronic asthma in the London smog also disrupted several postings. After Whitechapel, he went to Petersham in South London but was inhibited (suspended) after delivering a controversial sermon on the Ascension in May 1884. He held several short-lived posts in London parishes but his longest stints were as Rector of Orlestone in Kent for three years (1886–89) and as vicar of Hambridge (1893–1914).

== Australia ==
In April 1889 Marson became engaged to Clotilda (Chloe) Bayne, sister of his old university friend Ronald Bayne. She was one of the early students at Newnham College, Cambridge and a good friend of Philippa Fawcett. Seeking a fresh start in life, Marson then went out by ship to Adelaide, South Australia in June 1889 to be curate at St Peter's Glenelg and Chloe followed a year later to marry him.

At Glenelg and then at Parkside (a city suburb), Marson continued to be controversial, speaking out against the treatment of the Aborigines and in favour of social reforms. He supported Lucy Morice in her push for Votes for Women. In October 1891 he set up the first overseas branch of the Fabian Society, drawing in trade unionists like David Charleston, Robert Guthrie and John McPherson. In July 1889 Marson met Cecil Sharp, who had first arrived in Adelaide in November 1882 and was now a co-director of the Adelaide College of Music. They became friends. In August 1889 Marson delivered a public lecture on ‘Folk Ballads’. In November 1891 he published his first book Faery Stories, the same month that his first child Mary was born.

== Folk songs ==
In 1892 both Marson and Sharp returned to England, settling near each other in north London. In August 1893 Marson officiated at Sharp's wedding to Miss Constance Birch and was godfather to the first child Dorothea the following year. In May 1894 Marson did much practical help for the London Cabbies’ Strike. Marson then had to leave London with more ill health in 1895 to become vicar of Hambridge in South Somerset. Sharp was working by now as a music teacher at Ludgrove School, where he was keen to find interesting songs for his pupils to sing. In August 1903 Marson invited Sharp to visit him during his school holidays, whereupon Sharp notated John England (Marson's gardener) singing the folk song ‘The Seeds of Love’. Sharp was introduced by Marson to Lucy Anna White who is credited with shaping Sharp's objectives as initially he was unsure as to what made a song a foll song.

During the next three years travelling around by bicycle and train, Marson and Sharp collected 977 tunes or texts of folk songs, publishing 79 in three volumes of Folk Songs from Somerset. Sharp undoubtedly did most of the leg work (he was on holiday) but Marson was knowledgeable about folk songs with a handy library of reference books and great enthusiasm for the project. Sharp undertook the piano arrangements, while Marson was the lyrics editor.

Marson contributed much to the partnership. He introduced Sharp to 15 of his own parishioners, who sang over 140 songs; he provided a base from which Sharp could move about the neighbouring villages; he knew many clergymen in the area, who could also offer accommodation and locate potential singers. In contrast to other collectors like Sabine Baring-Gould, they were particularly successful with women singers – 474 songs (48.5% of total). Sharp used Somerset songs both in his school work and in his public lectures, as he mounted a press campaign to rescue English folk song from oblivion.

Unfortunately the two men quarrelled in November 1906 and their 17-year friendship came to an end. Sharp went on to become an authority on folk music and dance. Marson resumed his writing and parish work but died suddenly of ‘angina pectoris’ in March 1914 aged 54. His son, John Charles Marson, was killed, aged 19, at Suvla Bay, Turkey, on 8 August 1915. John Charles Marson is remembered at Sherborne School in the Book of Remembrance and by the Marson Prize founded by Mrs. Clotilda Marson in his memory.

== Selected bibliography ==
Marson wrote nine books and two significant articles which were published in The Commonwealth magazine. "Huppim & Muppim" (1901) was a biting comment on unimaginative religious education in schools and "And Ard" was equally mordant on the inadequate recruitment, training and role of the clergy in the modern world. Marson included his articles in his 1914 book. "Huppin and [sic} Muppim" is between pages 40 to 53 and "And Ard", which immediately follows it, is between pages 53 to 65.

- 1891 Faery Stories. E. A. Petherick, Adelaide - nine original children's stories
- 1894 Psalms at Work. Elliot Stock - commentary for clergy and lay people
- 1895 The Following of Christ. Elliot Stock - selection of thoughtful poetry and prose
- 1897 Turnpike Tales. Elkin Mathews - short psychological stories
- 1901 Hugh, Bishop of Lincoln. Edward Arnold - short biography of Bishop Hugh (1140-1200)
- 1905 Super Flumina. John Lane - book about fishing (Marson was a keen angler)
- 1909 Glastonbury. Gregory - Guide to the Somerset town
- 1914 Village Silhouettes. Society of SS. Peter & Paul - appreciation of village life
- 1914 God's Co-operative Society Suggestions on the strategy of the church. London: Longmans, Green, and Co. A summary of his thoughts on Church and society.
- 1930 God's Co-operative Society Suggestions on the strategy of the church. Bath: George Gregory Book Store. A reprint of his 1914 book with the insertion of three prefixes: two memoirs and his reply to the Secretary of the Royal Commission on Ecclesiastical Discipline of 1905.
