= Runaway slaves in Britain =

Several hundred enslaved Africans who had been brought to Britain via the Atlantic slave trade escaped captivity. Some Africans living in Britain would run away from their masters, many of whom responded by placing advertisements in newspapers offering rewards for the returns.

While very little is known about most of the escapees, some insight can be gained into the lives of some, through 17th and 18th century newspaper adverts.

- James Williams, born into slavery in North America circa 1735, escaped twice from Captain Isaac Younghusband of the ship "Pleasant". After his first attempt, he spent several months as a free man in the British Army, as a drummer in Sir Robert Riche's Dragoons. His enslaved status was discovered and he was discharged and returned to Captain Younghusband. Back on board the "Pleasant", James remained only a few days before successfully escaping again.
- Stephen Walcott was employed by Abel Dottin Senior in the county of Oxfordshire. He fled from Abel Dottin's home, called 'English' near Nuffield with his companion John Phillip. The first newspaper advert seeking his capture and return appeared on September 10, 1759. It is evident he arrived in London at the beginning of August as he was baptised in St. Andrew's of the Wardrobe parish church on the 6th. His baptism record describes him as a Creole, confirming he was born in the West Indies, most likely in Barbados where the Dottin family owned several plantations, including Farley Hall/Grenade Hall. Abel Dottin senior died shortly after placing the advert and passed all of his property to his son and namesake, who placed another advertisement seeking the return of his property but this time referring only to Stephen. Ship's payroll books for 1760, prove he secured a job on the Royal Navy hospital ship Phoenix until September 29, 1761, when he was discharged after his status as an enslaved man was discovered. He was taken to the Poultry Compter prison to await Dottin's arrival but, taking advantage of an eleven day delay, he escaped from prison and was still free when Dottin placed his last advert on the 18th of December.
- A group of young men of African heritage escaped from Stanton's Dockyard, Deptford in 1759. Known by the pseudonyms Boatswain, Johnny Mass, Jack Black and Harry Green, these four men ran from captivity aboard the Hampden packet ship, while she was being repaired. The ship's commander, Richard Mackenzie, believed they had made their way to Gravesend intending to board another vessel.
- John Lewis, was an enslaved African belonging to Captain James Reid, a mariner trading with Grenada who lived in East Lane, Rotherhithe. In April 1768, John returned to London on board the Lord Holland, East Indiaman – a merchant ship trading with India and China, lost the following year en-route to Madras. A few months later he absconded from the Reid house. An able seaman and servant, fluent in both English and French, he was highly valued. Captain Reid offered a significant reward of 5 guineas and expenses for his recapture and return, the equivalent of £500 today.
- Not all enslaved individuals in Britain were African. The word 'black' was used in 17th and 18th century newspaper adverts to describe people from many different non-white cultures. In 1764, a young girl known as Henny or Henrietta, described as an 'East India Black girl' (possibly from Bengal) lived with Ebenezer Mussel and his 23 year old wife, Sarah in Aldgate House, Bethnal Green. Ebenezer was well known as a Justice of the Peace, and was also an influential book collector. Henny ran away from the Mussel's just moments before her baptism at St Matthew's Church, Bethnal Green.
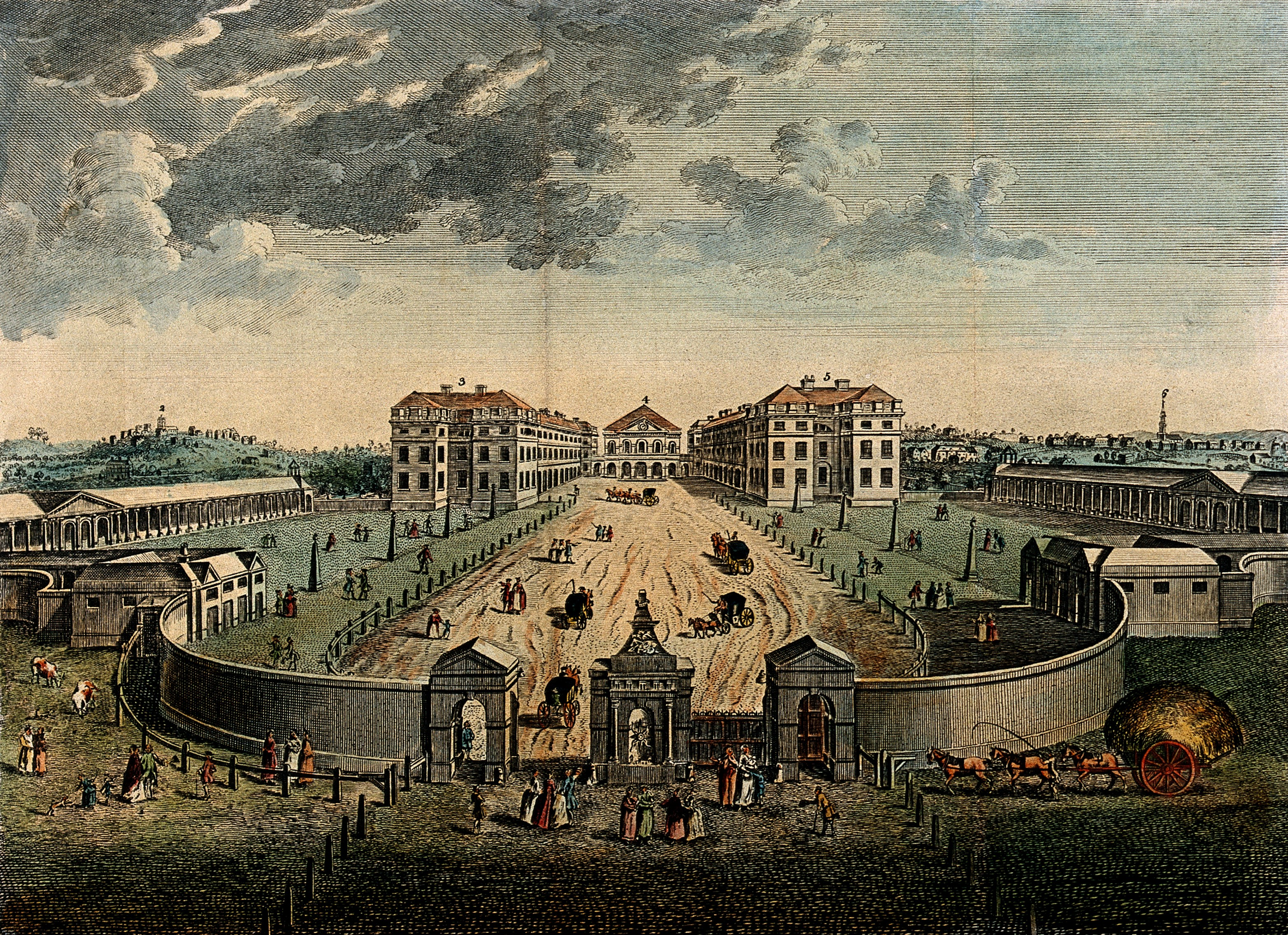
- The site of the Foundling Hospital 1753
  Christmas Bennett was a woman of colour, of an uncertain age, who found herself contracted to work for a Mr Gifford of Brunswick Row, Queen Square Great Ormond Street for an unknown number of years. In February 1748, after Christmas had been missing for three days and not returned, Mr Gifford placed an advert in the newspaper for more information about her whereabouts, though he was already aware that third parties could be hiding her somewhere around Whitechapel. Brunswick Row was next to the Foundling Hospital. A brickmaker called John Gifford is recorded in the Hospital accounts between 1739 and 1750. Gifford had expanded his business by building and renting houses on the site, from which the Hospital received an income. It is unclear whether Christmas was contracted to work as a household domestic servant, or in some other role relating to Gifford's brick and construction business. As an indentured employee she was contractually required to fulfil the term of her employment, whatever her legal status. In a flooded market, servants of all backgrounds commonly broke the terms of their employment and left without notice if a better position became available elsewhere.
- Ann Moor was an enslaved woman of colour in London, who ran away from Lieutenant Colonel John Perry on 22 October 1720. After Ann had been gone for over 10 days, Perry placed an advert in the newspaper seeking information about her whereabouts. He stated that if she returned of her own free will she would be 'kindly received'. Perry placed a second advert on 25 February 1721, requesting the address of an informer in order to pay a reward and giving African House, Leadenhall Street as his point of contact. A member of the public, who had chosen to remain anonymous and not collected payment, had provided information leading to Ann's capture and return but she had remained free for a number of months. Perry joined the Royal Navy as a teenager, becoming a lieutenant in April 1689. Scarcely a year later, he lost his right arm after a battle with a French privateer. He was promoted to captain and placed in charge of HMS Cygnet, a fireship which spent a year in the West Indies. Upon returning to London, his ship was attacked and forced to surrender. Found guilty of failing in his duty to secure his ship, he was sentenced to 10 years' imprisonment and given a £1000 fine. Three years later he was pardoned and acquitted by the Lords Justices. Perry's naval career then turned towards hydraulic engineering. After several years abroad, he was contracted to stop the breach in the Thames river wall at Dagenham, which was having a severe impact on shipping and trade in and out of London. Some 300 men built three dams which were completed in 1719. At the same time Ann ran away, Perry was spending considerable time in Rye, Dover and Dublin advising and designing harbour improvements. He never married, suggesting a dependence upon Ann, who may have been the only other member of his household. His regular absences would therefore have provided ample opportunity to leave and remain undetected for such a long time. As the second advert confirms, Ann had been returned to Perry by late February 1721, but it remains unclear whether she was still with him when he settled in Spalding, Lincolnshire in 1729. He died three years later, aged 63. Perhaps coincidentally, a woman called Ann Moor was buried in Spalding in 1772.

== See also ==
- Atlantic slave trade
- Slavery in Britain
