= Joan Tuckett =

Joan Tuckett (1895 - 31 August 1957) was the second female solicitor in Bristol. She was also an active Communist, women's rights playwright, athlete and aviator.

== Biography ==
Joan Tuckett was born in 1895 into a family of Bristol solicitors. Both Joan and her younger sister Angela Tuckett became solicitors as well. Their aunt, Enid Stacy, was an English socialist activist.

She met Doris Kathleen Flinn (1892-1977) by 1917. By 1920, Flinn moved to Bristol. Both Flinn and Tuckett were active Communists, Angela as well, and friends with Doris Brabham Hatt and Margery Mack Smith. Flinn, Joan and Angela Tuckett were also international hockey players and trained as pilots. The plaster model for a portrait head of Tuckett made by Flinn in 1925 is now at the Bristol Museum. In 1935, Flinn sculpted "Lawyer, Athlete, Aviator, Woman", a piece about Tuckett.

By 1923, Flinn was living at 5 Beaufort Buildings, Clifton, Bristol, Tuckett's family home, and ran a sculpture studio in Boyce's Avenue, Clifton, Bristol.

Other than being the second female solicitor in Bristol (her sister Angela being the first), Tuckett was also a playwright and in 1936 established and produced the work of the Unity Players' Club, performing at the left-wing Unity Theatre founded in Bristol by Joan Tuckett. With her sister Angela she wrote plays on women's rights like: The Bulls see Red, Passing unnoticed, Smash and Grab, Aiden & Abetten, and Charity begins. She was a member of the League of Progressive Writers. In the 1940s she was among the main supporter of the campaign to save the Georgian Theatre Royal in Bristol.

In 1930, they purchased The Rookery, a large stone-built XVIII century house at East Dundry, Bristol, where they lived there together until Tuckett's death on 31 August 1957. Flinn continued to live at The Rookery until her own's death in 1977.

== Legacy ==
The papers of Bristol Unity Players' Club covering minutes for 1937-46, correspondence, 1938-47, scripts, programmes, and photographs were deposited in the University of Warwick’s Modern Records Centre in 1980 by Angela Tuckett.
