= Andrew (Society of the Divine Compassion) =

British Anglican clergyman and friar

Henry Ernest Hardy (later known as Father Andrew) (7 January 1869 – 31 March 1946) was a British Anglican clergyman and friar, who co-founded the Society of Divine Compassion to work with the poor in the East End of London.

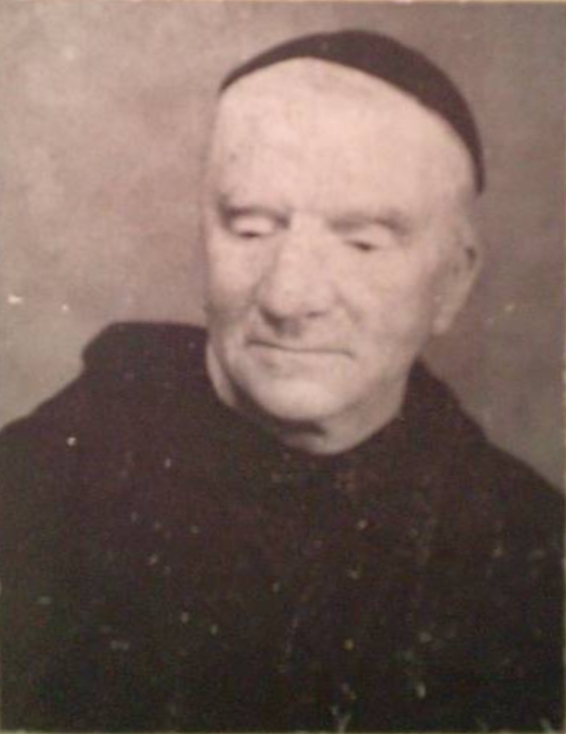
image of Father Andrew SDC

== Life ==
Hardy was born in Kasauli, India; his father was a colonel in the Indian army. After growing up in India, he attended Clifton College and an art school in Bristol, before studying at Keble College, Oxford, where he obtained a fourth-class degree in theology in 1891. While he was at Oxford, Arthur Winnington-Ingram (a Keble graduate who at the time was head of Oxford House in the East End of London, and later became Bishop of London) visited the university seeking volunteers to work with the poor. Hardy offered his services and moved to Oxford House in October 1891, where he combined administrative work with practical assistance to the needy.

In January 1894, his thoughts about combining a religious life and work with poor residents of London led him and two others (James Adderley and Henry Chappel) to found the Society of the Divine Compassion, taking religious vows of poverty, chastity and obedience and for his religious name: "Andrew". Brother Andrew was ordained a priest, following studies at Ely Theological College. The new society was then based in Plaistow, in the East End, and its members staffed St Philip's Church. Father Andrew was the last of the original three members of the community (Adderley left in 1897, and Chappel died in 1915) and was its central figure for many years, as well as acting as priest-in-charge of St Philip's from 1916 until his death, apart from a year spent on retreat in Southern Rhodesia. He was highly regarded as a confessor, spiritual guide and religious writer. (A bishop described him as a great man, such as God sends only once or twice in a generation.) He was also a talented painter. His health, which had troubled him for many years, worsened as a result of the strain imposed by the Second World War, which hit the East End severely – the church was bombed twice. He developed cancer, and died on 31 March 1946.

== The House of Divine Compassion ==
The House of Divine Compassion, a friary, was established at 92 Balaam Rd on September 8, 1908, following years spent in other Plaistow locations starting in 1896. The house number has changed over time, with street changes, and is now 42 Balaam Rd.

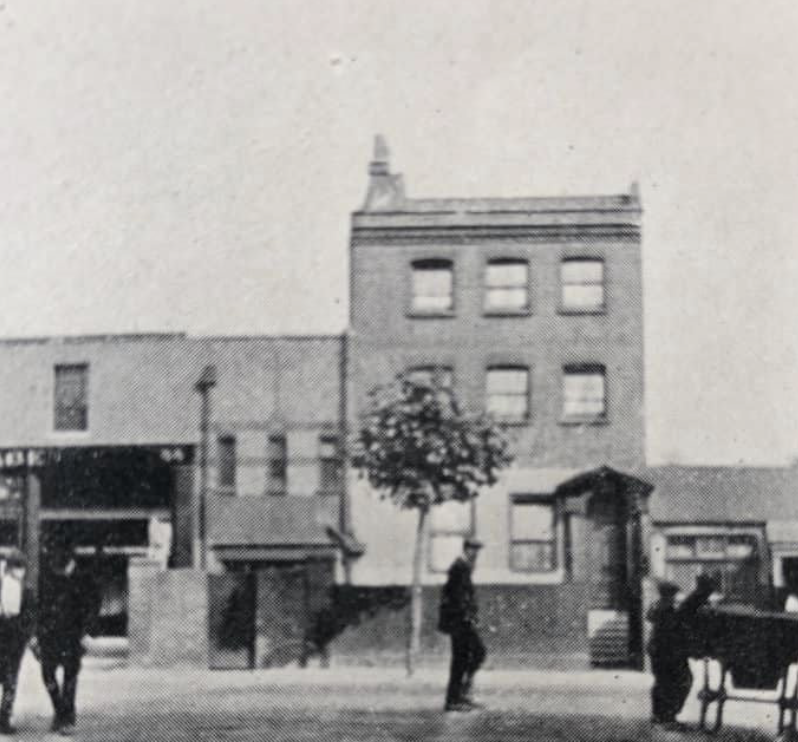
42 Balaam Rd Plaistow, called House of Divine Compassion

Soon after purchase they built a side building, initially used as a chapel, and now as home of a ministry called 'Helping Hands'. The building continues to be an active friary, and is heritage listed.

== Whitwell Press ==
In 1901 the Society of Divine Compassion started Whitwell Press (named after Whitwell Road). It mainly published religious literature, and had some government contracts.

One of its publications was a 'Gospel Stamp Album'. Its format was that it had '24 inner pages on cream paper, with printing in green. On page 1 the Church, Name and Address of the child Willie Harper have been handwritten. Page 2 gives the publisher and date, page 3 has the title, with illustration; the rest of the booklet includes a letter ‘To the Children’, followed by 16 pages where four stamps given at each Sunday service can be placed throughout the year'.

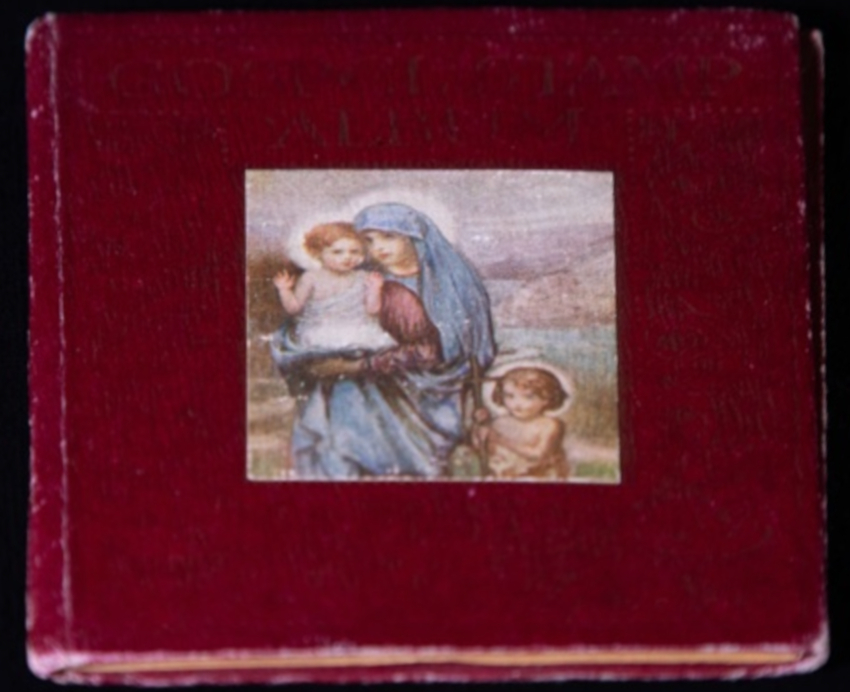
Album & Stamp Gospel: The Whitehall Press

The pictured example is from Wyverstone in Suffolk. However, other collections show how widely the Whitwell press Gospel Stamp albums were distributed, with examples from Norfolk, Hampshire, Essex and Bombay.

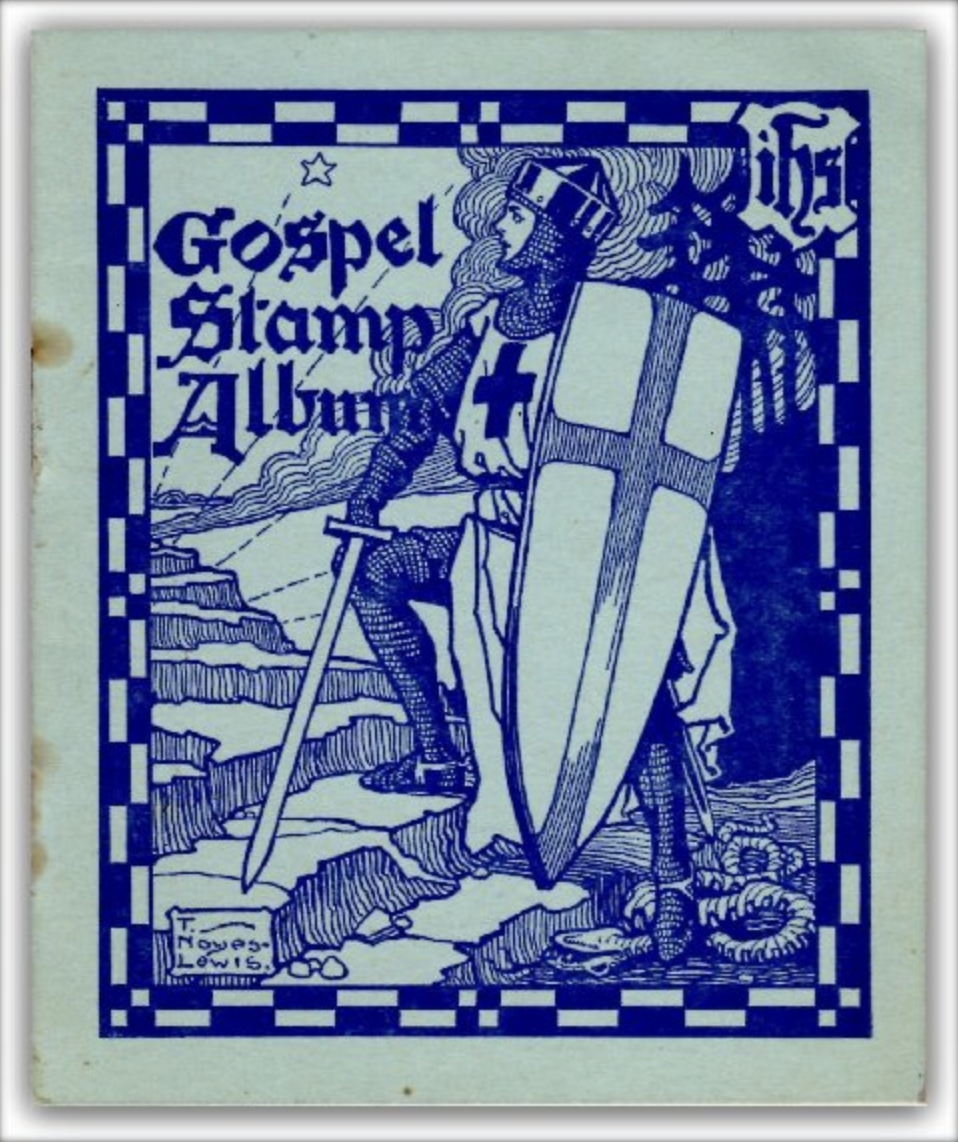
Gospel Stamp Album cover by T. Noyes-Lewis

The press also printed commercially, with Bernard Sleigh's 1909 'Fairyland' an example.

== Publications ==
Father Andrew's writings span devotions and commentary, poetry and autobiography, stage plays, and three known essays for other publications. Additionally, he wrote lyrics for at least a dozen songs and made one lasting contribution to the Church of England's hymnal: 'O Dearest Lord, Thy Sacred Head'. His long-time friend and editor, author and poet Kathleen E. Burne, edited many of his books in life and released some of his works posthumously, including a biography she wrote of him with a compilation of his letters. Project Canterbury lists 24 published works, but by comparing the records of the Lambeth Palace Library, the British Library, and the libraries of the House of the Divine Compassion and the Hillfield Friary (both now associated with the Society of Saint Francis), and adding those books and compilations edited by Burne, there are 59 known works. Of these, 41 were published by A R Mowbray and Co Ltd, who were based in Oxford and focussed on religious books, 5 more were published by Plaistow Press, 1 by the Society for the Propagation of the Gospel (SPG), and the rest by others. Of his books, only one is currently in print, Our Lady's Hymn, republished by the Akenside Institue for English Spirituality on December 12, 2018.

== Quotes ==
On light:

'It is the business of the Church to be the candlestick in which that Light ever shines, the holy lamp wherein that flame ever burns.'
