= Joseph Merceron =

British businessman, magistrate and politician

- Born: 29 January 1764; Bethnal Green, London
- Died: 14 July 1839 (aged 75); Bethnal Green, London
- Education: Merchant Taylors' School
- Occupations: Magistrate, businessman, parochial politician

Joseph Merceron (29 January 1764 – 14 July 1839) was a British businessman, property developer, parochial politician and magistrate notorious for his corrupt practices.

== Early life and family ==
Joseph Merceron was born and raised in Brick Lane, Bethnal Green in the East End of London. His family were of prominent Huguenot stock; his grandfather was a refugee who migrated to London following the Revocation of the Edict of Nantes. His father James Merceron (1723–1780) was a former silk-weaver turned pawnbroker and slum landlord who held various offices in the then-new parish of St. Matthew's, Bethnal Green. Bethnal Green was run by an ‘open' (i.e. elected) vestry, which offered opportunities for political manipulation. Merceron was educated at Merchant Taylors' School in the City of London, following which he spent time working in his father's pawnshop and in a local lottery office.

== Career ==
After the death of his father in 1780 Merceron became rent-collector for the family properties, subsequently extending his portfolio to include the estates of two local gentlemen, such that by age 20 he was rent-collector for 500 properties. This led him to become influential in the Bethnal Green vestry; by 1787 he had become a Commissioner of Land Tax for Middlesex and the Bethnal Green parish treasurer.

Further positions of responsibility followed and by 1795 Merceron became a Justice of the Peace for Middlesex, where he joined a corrupt clique including the magistrates' Chairman and Middlesex MP William Mainwaring. By this time Merceron was demonstrating an appetite for corruption and local power that saw almost every elected office in Bethnal Green in the hands of a small party of his followers. Supporters were rewarded with favourable tax or poor's rate assessments or the renewal of public-house licences. According to Sidney and Beatrice Webb, Merceron "amassed a considerable fortune, which he invested in public houses and cottage property within the parish, thus adding the power of the landlord to that of the parish officer and licensing justice". During this period he committed a series of frauds against the parish, including the misappropriation of a government grant awarded to relieve the parish poor, and against private individuals including a vulnerable orphan heiress and his own half-sister, whom he had detained in an insane asylum.

Since 1793 Britain had been at war with France, and William Pitt's government became increasingly drawn into attempts to restrain the growth of radical republican societies, such as the London Corresponding Society, particularly in the East End of London. The Middlesex magistrates and police offices were a key part of this strategy, which may have influenced the government to turn a blind eye to Merceron's corrupt activities. In 1798 Merceron became embroiled in a scandal over the conditions at Coldbath Fields Prison in Clerkenwell, where several radical sympathisers, including Colonel Edward Despard, were being held without trial. The scandal was exposed in Parliament by the young radical MP Sir Francis Burdett, who used it as the basis of his campaign against the Mainwaring family in the 1802 and 1804 Middlesex parliamentary elections.

Merceron's position was briefly threatened in 1804, when the Bethnal Green vestry instigated an audit of the parish accounts. Merceron promptly resigned as treasurer; but was re-elected in 1805. Bethnal Green continued to suffer violent disorder, with Merceron's regime encouraging bull-baiting and dog fighting, even while church services were taking place. Merceron's wealth and influence continued to grow, as he became a director of a number of important businesses including the East London Water Works Company and the Hand-in-Hand Fire Office.

Eventually a lengthy and more serious challenge began in 1809, led by a local distiller John Liptrap and Bethnal Green's new rector, Joshua King. In 1813 a prosecution for altering the poor's rate assessments failed, seemingly as a result of Merceron bribing the prosecution to drop the case, and the vestry not only passed a vote of confidence in Merceron but paid his expenses out of parish funds.

After several years of often violent disorder in Bethnal Green, a turning-point came when King was supported by a local businessman and philanthropist John Barber Beaumont and by Merceron's long-serving vestry clerk, who gave evidence against Merceron before a House of Commons select committee led by Whig MP Henry Grey Bennet in 1816, and then instigated a prosecution for the appropriation of £925 of parish funds and partiality in the renewal of public house licences. At the Easter vestry in 1818 Merceron was voted out of all parish offices, and shortly afterwards, amid great scandal, he was convicted of the charges against him. Despite further attempts to bribe his prosecutors, he was imprisoned in the King's Bench Prison for eighteen months.

However, the succeeding parochial regime in Bethnal Green was insufficiently strong to retain power against the Merceron faction and within a month of his release from prison he had regained control of the vestry. With the help of his son-in-law, by now vestry clerk, he consolidated his power through the abolition of the open vestry in 1823 and for the next decade or so his control of the parish was again absolute, despite worsening social conditions that led to a spiralling in the numbers of indoor and outdoor poor and to repeated outbreaks of typhus and cholera in the parish.

== Death and legacy ==
By the time of his death, from ‘suppressed gout' at aged 75 in 1839, the early Victorian social reformers had begun to expose the social conditions in Merceron's Bethnal Green as a national disgrace, with Charles Dickens having recently chosen it as the home of the murderer Bill Sikes and his prostitute partner Nancy in Oliver Twist. In a long and corrupt career Merceron had amassed more than £300,000, by some calculations enough to make him a billionaire in today's money, "though he always appeared to be in poor circumstances". His funeral at St Matthew's, Bethnal Green was as well orchestrated as his political meetings had been, attracting 20,000 people and establishing a template for East End gangster funerals at St. Matthew's that would be followed by the Kray twins more than 150 years later.

The Merceron family grave, together with that of his loyal henchman Peter Renvoize, are the only two graves still visible in the churchyard at St.Matthew's. Remarkably, both survived the devastation of church and churchyard that occurred on 7 September 1940 on the first day of the London Blitz. Merceron's name is commemorated in Bethnal Green in Merceron Houses, a 1901 development on part of Merceron's former gardens by the East End Dwellings Company, and Merceron Street.

== In popular culture ==
The majority of published records of Merceron's corrupt career and trial were alleged to have been destroyed by his family after his death. In 1906, his story was told as The Rule of the Boss by Sidney and Beatrice Webb to illustrate the potential for parochial corruption in their treatise on English Local Government. The description of Merceron as a political ‘Boss' reflected comparisons drawn by the Webbs with William Tweed, the corrupt New York municipal politician and leader of Tammany Hall in the 1860s.

A full-length biography of Merceron, The Boss of Bethnal Green: Joseph Merceron, the Godfather of Regency London by Julian Woodford, was published by Spitalfields Life Books in 2016.

In 2019, a partly fictitious version of Merceron, played by Tim Dutton and drawing on a number of incidents described in Woodford's biography, was written into Series 5 of Poldark by Debbie Horsfield.
