= Angela Tuckett =

First female solicitor in BristoL

- Born: 1906; Bristol, United Kingdom
- Died: 1994 (aged 87–88); Swindon, United Kingdom
- Occupations: Solicitor, playwright, athlete, aviator
- Political party: Communist Party
- Relatives: Joan Tuckett (sister); Enid Stacy (aunt)

Angela Gradwell Tuckett (1906–1994) a solicitor, playwright, athlete, and aviator who was the first female solicitor in Bristol.

== Biography ==
Angela Tuckett was born in 1906 into a family of Bristol solicitors. Both Angela and her older sister Joan Tuckett became solicitors as well. Their aunt, Enid Stacy, was an English socialist activist. When the 1931 Hunger March came to Bristol, she joined the Communist Party and took food to the marchers.

Tuckett was active in the Swindon Communist Party. She was a municipal (1963) and county council candidate (1967) for the Party, one of the "Women in Black". In 1962 Tuckett married Ike Gradwell, secretary of the Swindon Communist Party. She was also an international field hockey player and trained as pilot. In 1935 she refused to salute Hitler at a game in Berlin. The All England Women's Hockey Association did not re-select her for the team. She was a delegate to the London Trades Council, on the executive committee of the Labour Monthly, on the editorial committee of the William Morris Society. She was also active in the International Concertina Association, the English Folk-Dance and Song Society.

In 1940 she directed the legal department of the National Council for Civil Liberties and in 1942 she joined the staff of the Daily Worker. From 1948 to 1978 she worked on the Labour Monthly, for a time assistant editor under R. P. Dutt.

Other than being the first female solicitor in Bristol, Tuckett, together with her sister Joan, wrote plays on women's rights, including The Bulls see Red, Passing unnoticed, Smash and Grab, Aiden & Abetten, and Charity begins. In the 1930s she was active with the League of Progressive Writers.

== Legacy ==
The papers of Bristol Unity Players' Club covering minutes for 1937–46, correspondence, 1938–47, scripts, programmes, and photographs were deposited in the University of Warwick's Modern Records Centre in 1980 by Angela Tuckett.

Her own papers can be found at the Working Class Movement Library which published her biography of Enid Stacy, Our Enid, in 2016.
