= Ely Theological College =

Coordinates: 52°23′45″N 0°15′39″E

Ely Theological College was a college in Ely, Cambridgeshire, for training clergy in the Church of England. Founded in 1876 by James Woodford, Anglican Bishop of Ely, the college had a strong Anglo-Catholic tradition. Ely's "ritualistic" (i.e. "Catholic") tendencies were attacked by Mr Samuel Smith MP in a House of Commons debate in 1899.

Because of its reputation for strong Anglo-Catholicism the clergy trained there had little hope of rising to senior positions in the church; the first one to become a diocesan bishop was Edward Wynn in 1941. (Eric Mascall in his autobiography expresses the opinion that there were few differences in doctrine or liturgy between Ely and the theological colleges of Cuddesdon and Lincoln.) The principal from 1891 to 1911 was B. W. Randolph (also a canon of the cathedral); he was succeeded by Charles John Smith (previously vice-principal) who maintained the customs established in Randolph's time. The vice-principal was then Harry Thomas, a former missionary who later became the suffragan bishop of Taunton.

The college closed in 1964.

== Notable alumni ==
- Vigo Auguste Demant, Regius Professor of Moral and Pastoral Theology at Oxford University
- Alec Graham, Bishop of Newcastle
- Henry Ernest Hardy, also known as “Father Andrew”, co-founding friar of the Society of Divine Compassion, parish priest serving the East End of London
- Brian Brindley, Anglo-Catholic canon and later convert to Roman Catholicism
- Eric Lionel Mascall, theologian

== Notes and references ==
- Dowland, David A. (1997). Nineteenth-century Anglican Theological Training: The Redbrick Challenge. Clarendon Press. ISBN 978-0-19-826929-8.
- Mascall, Eric Lionel (1992). Saraband: The Memoirs of E. L. Mascall. Gracewing. ISBN 978-0-85244-222-7.
- Ollard, Sidney Leslie (1919). A Dictionary of English Church History. Morehouse Publishing Company.
- Symondson, Anthony (2004). "Renovating Heaven and Adjusting the Stars". In Damian Thompson (ed.). Loose Canon: A Portrait of Brian Brindley. A&C Black. ISBN 978-0-8264-7418-6.
