= Sydney Sarel =

British racewalker

Personal information
- Nationality: British (English)
- Born: 18 June 1872 Kensington, London, England
- Died: 23 December 1950 (aged 78) Bethnal Green, London, England

Sport
- Sport: Athletics
- Event: racewalking
- Club: London Athletic Club

Sydney Lancaster Sarel (18 June 1872 – 23 December 1950) was a British track and field athlete who competed in racewalking events and competed at the 1908 Summer Olympics.

== Biography ==
Sarel was educated at Tonbridge School and studied natural sciences at Keble College, Oxford. He taught science at Sir William Borlase's Grammar School before training for the priesthood. He was ordained in 1898 and served as a curate in Hoxton, then as vicar of St Matthew's, Bethnal Green.

Sarel represented Great Britain at the 1908 Summer Olympics in London, where he was eliminated in the first round of the 3500 metre walk competition.

He dedicated himself to missionary work and also the promotion of athletics. He was the president of London Athletic Club in 1928.
