= Stewart Headlam =

English Christian socialist (1847–1924)

- Born: Stewart Duckworth Headlam; 12 January 1847; Wavertree, Liverpool, England
- Died: 18 November 1924 (aged 77); St Margaret's-on-Thames, Middlesex, England
- Movement: Christian socialism; Anglo-Catholicism

Ecclesiastical career
- Religion: Christianity (Anglican)
- Church: Church of England
- Ordained: 1869 (deacon); 1871 (priest)

Stewart Duckworth Headlam (12 January 1847 – 18 November 1924) was an English Anglican priest who was involved in frequent controversy in the final decades of the nineteenth century. Headlam was a pioneer and publicist of Christian socialism, on which he wrote a pamphlet for the Fabian Society, and a supporter of Georgism. He is noted for his role as the founder and warden of the Guild of St Matthew and for helping to bail Oscar Wilde from prison at the time of his trials.

== Early years and education ==
Headlam was born on 12 January 1847 in Wavertree, near Liverpool, the elder son and third of four children of Thomas Duckworth Headlam, underwriter of Liverpool. His parental home was strictly evangelical, though not narrow or severe, but Headlam rejected with horror the doctrine of eternal punishment.

From 1860–65 (ages 13–18) Headlam attended Eton College. There he was influenced by a teacher, William Johnson, who was a disciple of the Christian Socialism of F. D. Maurice and Charles Kingsley.

Headlam matriculated at Trinity College, Cambridge in 1865. There he was taught by the Professor of Moral Theology, F. D. Maurice, the primary influence in his life. Headlam came to agree with Maurice that God's Kingdom on earth would replace a "competitive, unjust society with a co-operative and egalitarian social order."

Maurice's teaching and example shaped Headlam's life, starting with his decision to be ordained. Years later, Headlam told colleagues in the Fabian Society: that he had been delivered from "the belief that a large proportion of the human race are doomed to endless misery" by Maurice's teachings. Maurice instilled a "Christian humanism" in Headlam. In his Fabian Society Tract on "Christian Socialism," Headlam wrote, "I learnt the principles and was familiar with the title of 'Christian Socialism' from Maurice and Kingsley."

== Ordination and parish ministry ==
After Headlam took his degree from Cambridge in 1868, his father arranged with an Evangelical cleric, Herbert James, to give further training before ordination. But Headlam was not open to the teaching. James said, it was "impossible to budge" Headlam from his convictions based on Maurice's teachings.

Headlam received another years training under Charles Vaughan who recommended him for ordination as a deacon and found him a curacy at St John's, Drury Lane, London. Headlam was ordained deacon by Bishop John Jackson in 1869 and in 1871 as priest. His ordination as a priest was delayed by Jackson because of his reservations about Headlam's beliefs.

Headlam had five parish assignments, but he was dismissed from all of them. He was never "beneficed" and after being "constantly dismissed" with no curacy he could hold services only when friendly clergy invited him.

=== St John's Church, Drury Lane: 1869–1873 ===
Hedlam's first curacy was at St John's Church in Drury Lane. William Graham Maul was the vicar from 1855 to 1882.

Maul and Headlam had much in common. They were both friends of the Christian socialists F. D. Maurice and Charles Kingsley who had attracted them to Christian socialism.

At St John's, Headlam's special ministries were "church catechist" and making pastoral visits. The parishioners to whom Headlam ministered included "working people, actors, actresses, and artisans". Among these people, there were "music-hall dancers". These parishioners, Headlam observed, were "the victims of prejudice" and often "cold-shouldered" by other parishioners. Headlam, who was "notorious for his defence of the down-trodden of every sort," set out to remedy the situation by making dancing socially acceptable.

Headlam recognized that social acceptance of dance depended on "an appreciation of ballet as an autonomous aesthetic form". He adopted a threefold strategy to accomplish this goal: (1) provide an "authoritative exposition of the dance technique itself", (2) form the Church and Stage Guild, and (3) formulate a theology of dance.

In spite of what they had in common, Headlam fell foul of Maul who asked him to leave the parish in 1873. It was not only, or even mainly, a matter of dogma. He outraged respectable Victorian society by his public championing of the poor and his denunciations of the uncaring rich.

=== St Matthew's, Bethnal Green: 1873–1878 ===
In 1873, Headlam left Drury Lane for St Matthew's, Bethnal Green. Bethnal Green was an area of extreme poverty and Headlam was assigned to the most impoverished area.

The rector of the church, Septimus Hansard, was another Christian socialist who influenced the ideas of Headlam. Working with Hansard gave added "practical content" to Headlam's "socialist ideas".

The clergy usually lived outside St Matthew's parish, but Headlam "rented a flat in a working-class building." Although Headlam lived "among" his people, he did not live "like" them. His "independent means" enabled him to furnish his rooms in an "individual style."

By 1875, "men and their needs now became the centre of [Headlam's] Christianity". Living near the church Headlam saw the "degradation and suffering" of the workers. Having seen this, Headlam told the St Matthew's congregation that when people are "not fed so as to grow up and healthily", it is a "witness against the Church" that she has "neglected her primary duty".

==== Poor attendance at church; good attendance at theatres; Headlam's defence ====
St. Matthew's, Bethnal Green, was noted for poor attendance. "The poor of Bethnal Green spent their Sunday mornings sleeping and the remainder of the day at the dancing room, the music hall, or the beer shop." "Headlam was determined to win them back for Christ, beginning with the young people." He made Sunday School more interesting and made it coeducational.

Headlam also went to see the "cheap theatres" his parishioners attended rather than church services. This research was documented in a pamphlet. The problem for Headlam was that his "defence of the Music Hall and the ballet as being worthy occupations and uplifting pastimes" was an "anathema" to the puritan and political climate. In the face of opposition, Headlam gave a lecture on "Theatres and Music-Halls" in which he expounded a positive Christian view of theatre and the theatrical profession. The speech inflamed Headlam's opponents and led to his bishop removing him from his curacy at St Matthew's.

==== The Guild of St Matthew ====
Inspired by Maurice's Christian socialism Headlam was determined to do all he could to reduce working class suffering. Disturbed by the appalling living conditions of his parishioners Headlam used his sermons to attack the wide gap between rich and poor. He presented Jesus Christ as a revolutionary and when John Jackson, the Bishop of London who had long been concerned about Headlam's teaching, heard about this, he threatened Headlam with dismissal. Headlam refused to change his views.

In his efforts for the working class, in 1877, Headlam founded the Guild of St Matthew and led it to national prominence. Its original purpose was to increase attendance at early Eucharist.

Headlam challenged workers to unite to strike down "the customs and circumstances" that make them "mere hands" for the production of goods. He not only issued verbal challenges, Headlam worked with the trade union movement, especially the Women's Trade Union League. However, Headlam had no specific proposals until he read Henry George's Progress and Poverty (D. Appleton & Co., 1879). From then on George replaced Maurice as the major influence in Headlam's thinking.

==== 1878: Dismissal and marriage ====
Early in 1878, Headlam was dismissed from St Matthew's. His socialism was only one of Headlam's conflicts with authorities. The immediate cause of his dismissal was his "lecture in praise of the theatre and music halls." In June, he received a testimonial of 100 guineas raised by supporters.

Given the fact that Headlam "could never keep a job", it was fortunate that his father and grandfather were underwriters in Liverpool. From them, he inherited private means on which to live when unemployed.

On 24 January 1878, Headlam married Beatrice Pennington at St. Augustine's Church, Queensgate. The marriage was dissolved in a very short time. He discovered his wife was a lesbian.

Headlam was left with no prospect for employment, but in 1879 he was offered a curacy by John Rodgers, vicar of St Thomas's Charterhouse.

=== St Thomas's Charterhouse: 1878–1880 ===
In 1878, Headlam became a curate at St Thomas's under the vicar, the Revd John Rodgers. Rodgers was "the most understanding incumbent" under whom Headlam would serve and even defended him in letters to Bishop Jackson. While at St Thomas's, Headlam continued his defence of theatre and ballet by forming the Church and Stage Guild. The death of Rodgers on 25 October 1879 ended Headlam's curacy at St Thomas's. Rodgers had served on the London School Board as Headlam was to do later.

=== St Michael's Shoreditch: 1880–1882 ===
Headlam's curacy at St Michael's Shoreditch was brief because the parishioners strongly opposed his positions.

From 1882 until its demise in 1903, Headlam sat on the London School Board. He took an active role in the promotion of evening classes for adults, especially as chairman of the Evening Continuation Schools Committee from 1897.

=== St George's Botolph: 1884 ===
A trial curacy in 1884 ended when Headlam, at a rally, called for the abolition of the House of Lords.

In 1884, Headlam used own money to buy and later to finance a newspaper, The Church Reformer: An Organ of Christian Socialism and Church Reform, that became virtually the voice of the Guild of Saint Matthew. The Church Reformer was published for eleven years. It supported land reform as advocated by Henry George.

==== End of parish ministry ====
After leaving St. George's Botolph in 1884, Headlam asked Bishop Jackson for a general licence to officiate in the diocese, but Jackson refused. Jackson's successor Frederick Temple also refused. Although his licence was eventually reinstated in 1898, he was never again to hold permanent office in the Church of England. After being "constantly dismissed" with no curacy, Headlam was reduced to holding services only when friendly clergy invited him.

Beginning with his ordination, Headlam's "beliefs and actions" led to constant conflict with his ecclesiastical superiors and removal from curacies until he finally "abandoned of the idea of a parish ministry." From then on, Headlam "devoted his time propagating Socialism" through his Guild of St. Matthew (until its demise in 1909) and membership in the Fabian Society and membership on the London County Council.

== Politics ==
In 1873, after leaving St John's, Headlam received a curacy from Septimus Hansard, the rector of St Matthew's Church in Bethnal Green in London's East End, where poverty was the intrusive fact of social life. His response, in the form of a synthesis of ideas going back a generation to the Oxford Movement with socialist thinking, was startling although not entirely original. He attributed it in part to Charles Kingsley, but more especially to F. D. Maurice, whose incarnational theology he embraced while a student at Cambridge University. He added to the ideas of these early Christian Socialists a profound commitment to the creeds and to sacramental worship which he drew from the Anglo-Catholic ritualists whose work in the London slums he deeply admired. He was also a harsh critic of evangelicalism, condemning it as individualistic and otherworldly. He befriended working-class secularists and their leader, Charles Bradlaugh, even as he fought secularism itself. He also championed the arts in a broad sense, including the theatre, at a time when many clergy regarded it as morally suspect, and more scandalous still, the music hall, and ballerinas danced in flesh-coloured tights. Politically, from the time he left Cambridge, Headlam regarded himself as a socialist of sorts. While he was in Bethnal Green his politics took a more radical turn, and in the years that followed he joined his socialism to an enthusiastic support for Henry George's 'single tax', a policy that was gaining support in the Liberal Party. Yet because of his belief in individual liberty and his hostility to political sectarianism, he remained a member of the Liberal Party. He was elected to the London County Council as a Liberal Party–backed Progressive candidate for Bethnal Green South West latterly in opposition to Labour candidates. These ideas formed a heady mixture and his preaching of it, in a form often directed frankly against 'the rich', kept open the quarrel with Bishop Jackson and would inspire yet another with Jackson's successor, Frederick Temple.

== Guild of St Matthew ==
Headlam formed the Guild of St Matthew on 29 June 1877 (St Peter's Day). It began as a guild within St Matthew's Church, Bethnal Green, East London. However, in addition to parishioners, the Guild included other "London curates with radical views", so it soon grew to forty members.

The Guild's initial purpose was increasing attendance at early Eucharist. Its stated objects were: (1) better observance of the "rules of worship" in the Book of Common Prayer, (2) removal of prejudices against the sacraments, and (3) to promote "friendly intercourse, recreation and education" among its members.

When Headlam was dismissed from St Matthew's in 1878, he took the Guild with him. No longer merely a parish guild, the Guild became organised on a national basis with local branches The Guild's aims widened to include "the promulgation of those elements in Christian social doctrine that would ameliorate the conditions of the poor through the creation of a just and equal society."

As a national organisation, the Guild linked Christian Socialists and Anglo-Catholics. This combination was incorporated in the Guild's three objectives:

1. "to get rid, by every possible means, of existing prejudices, especially on the part of 'secularists' against the Church, her sacraments and doctrines, and to endeavor to justify God to the people."
2. "to promote frequent and reverend worship in the Holy Communion, and a better observance of the teaching of the Church of England as set forth in the Book of Common Prayer."
3. "to promote the study of social and political questions in the light of the Incarnation."

The work of the Guild got off to a slow start as an extra-parochial society. However, by 1884 its work was in "full swing". The Guild published a list of 24 lecturers willing to speak on 130 subjects. At its annual meeting, the Guild adopted resolutions endorsing socialism and Henry George's "theory of Land Nationalization". Headlam and other Guild members put their words into action by working in the English Land Reclamation League.

In 1884, Headlam used his own money to buy and edit a newspaper, The Church Reformer: An Organ of Christian Socialism and Church Reform, which became "virtually (though never officially) the mouthpiece of the Guild". The Church Reformer went bankrupt and published its last issue in December 1895.

In the early 1890s, the Guild reached its peak membership of 364, of whom 99 were Anglican priests. Writing on behalf of the Guild, Headlam, in 1890, appealed that the "evils of poverty" be not "alleviated by Christian charity, but that they may be prevented by Christian justice."

In the Guild's doctrines, the goals of Christian justice included "(a) to restore to the people the value they gave to the land" where they worked, "(b) to bring about a better distribution of the wealth created by labour", and (c) "to give to the whole body of the people a voice in their own government", and (d) "to abolish false standard of worth and dignity".

The Guild's 1892 annual report showed that the old battle against secularism ended with the death of Charles Bradlaugh in 1891. Most of the activity of the Guild was redirected toward "election campaigns".

In the 1893 annual meeting, whether to characterise the Guild as "socialist" was discussed with a decision in the negative. As explained by Headlam, although the Guild was composed of "socialists who claim that socialism is Christian", to use the name officially would be "misleading and confusing both to friend and foe".

In spite of Headlam's resistance to the term, scholars characterise the Guild of St Matthew as "socialist". Kenneth Leech says that the Guild was "the first explicitly socialist group in Britain" and Peter d'Alroy Jones describes the Guild as "the pioneer Christian socialist society of the revival period in Britain."

Before 1895, dissatisfied members usually withdrew and joined the larger Christian Social Union. In this year, increased dissatisfaction with Headlam as warden of the Guild resulted in a "large defection". In spite of dissatisfaction and defections in the membership, Headlam acted as warden of the Guild throughout its existence and his beliefs were reflected in its "proceedings and policies". He did not consult with others and acted as if the Guild should act according to his ideas. Headlam's arrogating control of the Guild constituted the primary reason for the dissatisfaction and defections.

In 1909, the Guild of St Matthew ceased to exist.

Norman describes the Guild as "a clerical, sacramentalist, Anglican and Socialist organization, existing largely for propagandistic purposes. Regardless of the immediate effects of its propaganda, the Guild molded "the radicalism of a number of Christian Socialists" who in the following decades played roles in the Anglican church's "social discourse". These people included Conrad Noel, Percy Dearmer, J. G. Adderley, P. E. T. Widdrington, F. L. Donaldson, C. W. Stubbs, Charles Marson, and Frank Weston.

== 'Church and Stage' ==
Headlam, in his lecture entitled Theatres and Music Halls and delivered on 7 October 1877 at the Commonwealth Club, Bethnal Green, said many religious people would think him wrong to speak of theatres and music halls except in condemnation; and even more would think him wrong to do so on a Sunday night. He recalled two women, members of his congregation in Drury Lane, who kept their profession as actresses a secret for many months, fearing that he, as a clergyman, would despise them. Conversely, he declared a deep respect for all those who "minister to our amusements" and said their work was as sacred as any other. In the introduction to the second edition of his published lecture he said, "I hold as an eternal truth that the Incarnation and Real Presence of Jesus Christ sanctifies all human things, not excluding human passion, mirth, and beauty."

He also believed good theatre could teach morality. "I defy anyone to see one of Shakespeare's great tragedies fairly well acted without having most tremendous moral lessons brought home to him," Furthermore, he believed even unsophisticated entertainment could be beneficial and that theatregoing, in moderation, had "a brightening, educating effect". To "gloomy religious people" he said, "you do much more harm by a sweeping condemnation of a place than by a discriminating judgment. Recognise the good in any place or person, and then you have a right, and a power too, to go against the evil with some chance of success".

More recently, he had come to see that even music halls had value. Managers were not to blame for the faults of their clientele, be they coarse or low, or loose women; the fault lay rather with "modern civilisation". He was, however, critical of the quality of music hall songs.

John Jackson, Bishop of London, responding to a summary of the lecture in The Era, wrote to Headlam, "It is, of course, vain to argue with one who prefers so unhesitatingly his own judgment backed by the approval of actors and proprietors of Music Halls to that of his Incumbent and his Bishop, neither of whom can well be considered Puritan: but I do pray earnestly that you may not have lo meet before the Judgment Seat those whom your encouragement first led to places where they lost the blush of shame and took the first downward step towards vice and misery."

At St Thomas's on 30 May 1879, Headlam continued his defence of popular theatre, and especially the ballet, by forming the Church and Stage Guild. Within a year it had more than 470 members with at least 91 clergy and 172 professional theatre people. Its mission included breaking down "the prejudice against theatres, actors, music hall artists, stage singers, and dancers."

== Fabian Society ==
In his Fabian Society Tract No. 42, Headlam wrote that the Christian Church "is intended to be a society not merely for teaching a number of elaborate doctrines ...; but mainly and chiefly for doing on a large scale throughout the world those secular, socialistic works which Christ did on a small scale in Palestine."

In December 1886, Headlam joined the Fabian Society and for several years served on the society's executive committee. In 1888, he and Annie Besant were elected to the London School Board as members of Progressive Party, a broad coalition of London liberals, radicals and socialists. In 1902 the Conservative government abolished school boards across England and transferred their responsibilities to the county councils. Although this was a reform designed in large part by his fellow Fabian, Sidney Webb, and endorsed by the Fabian Society, Headlam, like many others on the Left, denounced it as undemocratic. The new Education Act spared the London School Board, but only temporarily. It was also abolished in 1904. Despite his expectation that he would be able run as a Progressive candidate for the London County Council that year and be given a seat on the education committee, the Progressives did not nominate him, perhaps because of pressure from Webb and his allies. It was not until 1907 that he was elected to the council where he continued to be a tireless advocate for working-class children and their teachers. In the same year he published The Socialist's Church. He continued as a political figure for the rest of his life.

== Oscar Wilde's bailer ==
On 3 April 1895 the first trial of Oscar Wilde began. This trial ended with a jury deadlocked on most of the charges. A second trial was scheduled in three weeks. During the interim, Wilde could be released if his bail requirements were met.

Bail for the three weeks of freedom "on his own recognizance" between criminal trials was set at a total of £5,000. Headlam, who did not know Wilde personally, put up half the £5,000 bail required for Wilde's release. Headlam stated his motive as "concern for the arts and freedom".

At his second trial, Wilde was found guilty, and sentenced to two years of hard labor. When Wilde was released after serving his sentence, Headlam was there to meet him at six o'clock in the morning on 19 May 1897.

'Homosexuals in Headlam's life'
Headlam did not condone homosexuality. However, his willingness to help Wilde may have been connected with the fact that "others close to him had been caught in similar sexual tangles". Headlam's own short-lived marriage in 1878 had been to a lesbian, Beatrice Pennington.

Headlam's close relations with other homosexuals included his Eton master William Johnson and his friend C. J. Vaughan.

== Post-curacy years ==
Beginning with his ordination as a deacon in 1869, Headlam was repeatedly in conflict with his ecclesiastical superiors that led to removal from curacies until he finally "abandoned of the idea of a parish ministry" in 1884. However, he continued to be active in social reform until shortly before his death in 1924. Central to Headlam's activity was his work within the voluntary organisations of his Guild of St Matthew (until its demise in 1909) and the Fabian Society.

Church

Headlam addressed the 3rd Lambeth Conference in 1888 arguing that Christian socialism is biblical, but the bishops gave him "little heed".

In January 1898, Headlam was granted a general licence to preach by the new Bishop of London, Mandell Creighton. From then until his dying days, Headlam celebrated Mass every Sunday at All Souls Church in Haliburton Road.

Education

Headlam became increasingly involved with "educational reform".

Education was one of the two top priorities for Headlam in post-curacy years. He had long viewed education as essential for social transformation, So in 1882, he was elected to the London School Board, an activity that he continued the rest of his life. The London School Board was absorbed into the London County Council in 1903, so Headlam ran for and was elected to the London County Council for the Progressive Party in 1907 as a way of continuing his work in educational reform. He sat on the council until his death.

Land Question

The "Land Question" was the other issue that occupied Headlam in his mature years. The Land Question was about "the use and ownership of land" and "landlordism" and many remedies were proposed.

Lectures offered by the Guild of St Matthew emphasised "the land question as fundamental" for Christian socialists. After reading Henry George's Progress and Poverty (1886), Headlam asserted that "Land Nationalization is a necessary corollary of Christian Socialism."

In 1906, Headlam began the Anti-Puritan League, but it gained only few members.

In 1907, Headlam published The Socialist's Church.

Vindication

After years of conflict with and dismissals by his ecclesiastical superiors, Headlam was vindicated at the end of his life.

In October 1924, during his terminal illness, Headlam received a letter from Randall Davidson the Archbishop of Canterbury.

My dear Headlam,

I hear a report that you are unwell. I hope that it is not serious and work
can go on, for I fear that your absence in some circles, educational and other,
would be bad for 'affairs' in the country. You, at least, whatever be said
about the rest of us, have been consistent in your devotion to the cause or
causes for which you care. God keep and bless you.

Most truly yours, Randall Cantaur

Headlam immediately replied with a "heartfelt letter of thanks". He later commented, "Now I feel I can say that I have won."

Death

Within a month, more heart attacks led to Headlam's death at his home, "Wavertree", Peter's Road, St Margaret's-on-Thames, Middlesex, on 18 November 1924.

His funeral was held at All Souls in St Margarets and he was buried at East Sheen Cemetery on 24 November.

Retrospection

"Despite Headlam's energy, his rebellious character and his unusual combination of socialism with Christian sacramentalism deprived him of much permanent influence either in the church or in the political world. His practical achievements were limited. He was a prophetic figure, whose passion for social justice was to inspire the small group of Anglican clergy exploring the political application of Christian social concern in the late nineteenth and early twentieth centuries."

== Works ==
- The Church Catechism and the Emancipation of Labour (London: 1875)
- Theatres & Music Halls: a Lecture Given at the Commonwealth Club, Bethnal Green, on Sunday, October 7, 1877 (Westminster: Women's Printing Society, 2nd Ed; rprt Forgotten Books, 2015)
- Priestcraft and Progress: Being Sermons and Lectures (London: Hodges, 1878)
- The Service of Humanity and Other Sermons (London: J. Hodges, 1882 )
- The Sure Foundation: An Address Given before the Guild of S. Matthew, At the Annual Meeting, 1883 (London: F. Verinder, 1883)
- Lessons from the Cross: Addresses Given on Good Friday (London: F. Verinder, 1886)
- The Aggressive Archangel: a Sermon (London: F. Verinder, 1887)
- The Theory of Theatrical Dancing with a Chapter on Pantomime: Edited from Carlo Blasis' Code of Terpsichore with the Original Plates (London: F. Verinder, 1888)
- The Laws of Eternal Life Being Studies in the Church Catechism (London: William Reeves, 1888; rprt Elibron Classics, 2005)
- Function of the Stage (London: F. Verinder, 1889).
- The Ballet (London, 1894)
- Christian Socialism: A Lecture Fabian Tract No. 42 (London: The Fabian Society, 1894.)
- The Guild of St. Matthew: What it is and who should join it (London: Guild of St Matthews, 1895.)
- Classical Poetry (London: 1898)
- The Place of the Bible in Secular Education: An Open Letter to the Teachers under the London School Board (London: S. C. Brown, Langham, and Co., 1903)
- The Meaning of the Mass: Five Lectures and Other Sermons and Addresses (London: S. C. Brown, Langham and Co., 1905; rprt Forgotten Books, 2015))
- Preface to The Mother Kate, Old Soho Days and Other Memories (London: Mowbray & Co., 1906; rprt Leopold Classic Library, 2015))
- Socialism and Religion Fabian Socialist Series, No 1 (London: Fifield, 1908.)
- Fabianism and Land Values: A Lecture delivered to the Fabian Society on October 23, 1908 (London: Office of the English League for the Taxation of Land Values, 1908)
- The Socialist's Church (London: G. Allen, 1907).

Publication information not found

- The Secular Work of Jesus Christ and His Apostles: An Address to the Society of Secularists.
- Salvation Through Christ: A Sermon Preached for the Guild of St. Matthew (London: F. Verinder)
- The Clergy as Public Leaders: A Paper Read before the Junior Clergy Society of London
- Some Old Words on the War
