= Guild of St Matthew =

- Named after: Matthew the Apostle
- Formation: 29 June 1877
- Founder: Stewart Headlam
- Founded at: Bethnal Green, England
- Dissolved: 1909
- Warden: Stewart Headlam

The Guild of St Matthew was an English high-church Christian socialist association led by Stewart Headlam from its establishment in Bethnal Green on 29 June 1877 when Headlam was Curate at St Matthew's to its dissolution in 1909. While the guild never had a membership of more than about 400 people, it was "the pioneer Christian socialist society of the revival period in Britain", breaking the ground for other Christian socialist organisations yet to come, such as the Christian Social Union. Kenneth Leech described it as "the first explicitly socialist group in Britain". For many years, it published the periodical The Church Reformer.

== See also ==
- Anglo-Catholicism
- Charles Kingsley
- Charles Marson
- Frederick Denison Maurice
