= St Matthew's, Bethnal Green =

Coordinates: 51°31′31″N 0°4′2″W

St Matthew, Bethnal Green
- Church of St Matthew, Bethnal Green
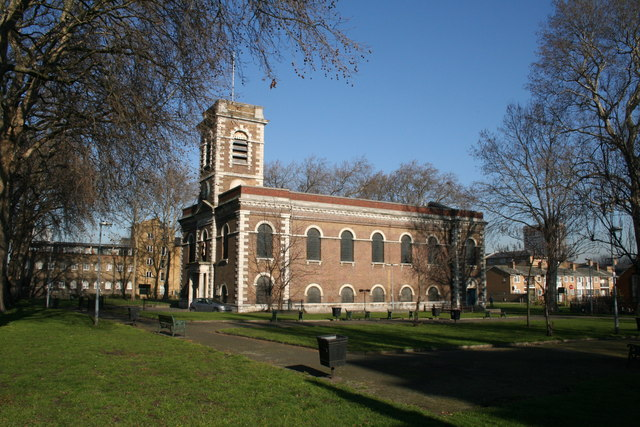
- View of St Matthew Bethnal Green
- St Matthew, Bethnal Green
- OS grid reference: TQ 34183 82462
- Location: St Matthew's Row, Bethnal Green, Tower Hamlets, London E2 6DT
- Country: England
- Denomination: Church of England
- Churchmanship: Anglo-Catholic (Inclusive Church)
- Website: www.st-matthews.org.uk

Architecture
- Architect(s): George Dance the Elder (1743-46); Thomas Knightley (1859-61); J. Anthony Lewis (1958-61)
- Years built: 1746, 1861 (following fire damage), 1961 (following damage in WWII)

Administration
- Diocese: London

St Matthew's, Bethnal Green, is an 18th-century church in Bethnal Green, London, England. It is an Anglican church in the Diocese of London.

== History of the building ==
The church was built 1743–46, to a Classical design by George Dance the Elder. There is a tower, to the centre of the west end, rising above a pedimented, slightly advanced central section. Dance's design was not the first: Nicholas Hawksmoor had produced a plan for the 1711 Commission for Building Fifty New Churches, but, like most of the ambitious target, it failed to come to fruition.

A fire in 1859 destroyed the interior of the church, although the registers and the church plate were saved. It was rebuilt (including a cupola being added to the tower) in 1861 to a design by Thomas Knightley. The roof and interior were destroyed by enemy action in 1940. A temporary church was created within the shell in 1954 by A Wontner Smith and Harold Jones. The old church was rebuilt from 1958 to 1961 (without the side galleries) by Anthony Lewis of Michael Tapper & Lewis, with what the list entry describes as a 'bold post-war interior'. That post-war interior includes works by a roll-call of eminent 20th-century ecclesiastical artists: an upper-level Lady Chapel at the east end with panelling carrying the apostles by Peter Snow; a bas-relief depicting the war between Heaven and Hell and St Michael and the angels doing battle with the devil by Kim James; wall paintings by Barry Robinson; sand-blasted glass doors by Heather Child; sculptured panels on the altar by Robert Dawson; a vesica-shaped marble font by Anthony Lewis; and fired ceramic Stations of the Cross by Donald Potter. The church was reconsecrated by Henry Montgomery Campbell, Bishop of London, in 1961.

The earliest organ of which the National Pipe Organ Register has details was an instrument which was installed in 1772 from a church in Newbury and rebuilt by Byfield and Green. That organ was destroyed in the 1859 fire. It was replaced by a Henry Jones organ dating from 1861. The Jones organ was destroyed in the war-time bombing. Services were held in the ruins, and an Estey reed organ was played. Noel Mander of Mander Organs installed and slightly modified an 1877 Eustace Ingram organ in the temporary church in 1954. The National Pipe Organ Register states that this organ came from the Bethnal Green Lutheran Church, but Maxim states that it was from the former church of St Matthias, Bethnal Green, and refers to the evidence of plaques on the organ. Mander then reinstalled the Ingram organ in the rebuilt church in 1961.

The church has a ring of eight bells, all cast in 1861 (after the 1859 fire) by George Mears of the Whitechapel Bell Foundry.

The church itself is Grade II* listed; it is the classical exterior that is the primary reason for the high level of listing. The railings, wall and gate piers to the churchyard are separately listed Grade II, as is the parish watch house, which dates from 1826.

== History of the parish ==
Until the time of Joseph King (rector, 1809–61), the rectors held the advowson in plurality and in absence: there is no record of William Loxham, rector for 43 years, of ever having even visited the parish. Day-to-day pastoral work was left to poorly-paid curates. It was King who sought, initially with some success but ultimately unsuccessfully, to counter the corrupt regime of the churchwarden Joseph Merceron. In 1823 King moved to a wealthier and less populous parish which he had inherited in 1821.

Septimus Hansard (rector, 1864–95) was a Christian Socialist and a friend of F. D. Maurice; he and Edward Pusey were active in assisting cholera victims in 1866. Hansard introduced a daily Eucharist and reservation of the sacrament. It was during Hansard's incumbency that St Matthew's had its most notable curate: the Christian Socialist Stewart Headlam (Curate, 1873–78) who established the Guild of St Matthew in the parish in 1877. Headlam's socialist views were so extreme that he was never offered an incumbency, and, for 14 years, was even refused a licence to officiate. Hansard's successor was Arthur Winnington-Ingram (Rector, 1895–97) who had been head of the Oxford House settlement since 1888.

The church, bombed on the first night of the Blitz, continued to serve the community during World War II with a temporary church erected within its bombed-out shell. During the 1990s following the 1993 ruling to ordain women as priests, the then incumbent, Christopher Bedford, converted to Catholicism and, for a time, held both Roman Catholic and Anglican services within the historically Church of England church. When he eventually departed, two thirds of parishioners followed him to Roman Catholicism. Those who remained worked with three priests-in-charge to stabilise the church before appointing Kevin Scully as the new, long-term, rector in 2002. Following his departure in 2018, and an irreconcilable dispute between the new incumbent and parish council, many of those who had remained following Christopher Bedford’s departure in the 1990s, resigned from their duties in 2021.

The funerals of the Kray twins were both held at St Matthew's, in 1995 and 2000 respectively.

== Churchyard ==
The churchyard closed to burials in the 1850s. The landscape gardener Fanny Wilkinson, for the Metropolitan Public Gardens Association, converted it to a public garden in 1896. Wilkinson removed all but two of the tombs, one of which is Merceron's.

== Rectors ==
Until the mid-19th century, the parish was a college living of Brasenose College, Oxford, with all rectors up to Joshua King being from Brasenose College.

- 1743–1747 John Brookbank
- 1748–1765 Edward Davenport
- 1766–1809† William Loxham
- 1809–1861† Joshua King
- 1861–1864† Timothy Gibson
- 1864–1895† Septimus C. H. Hansard
- 1895–1897 Arthur Winnington-Ingram (subsequently Bishop of London)
- 1898–1901 Bernard R. Wilson
- 1901–1916 Herbert V. S. Eck
- 1916-39 Sydney L. Sarel
- 1939-49 Francis W. Ferraro
- 1949-57 Alfred Arthur Gorbold
- 1958-68 Charles Geoffrey How
- 1968-74 Cyril Ashton Rowe
- 1974-79 Kenneth Leech
- 1981-96 Christopher John Charles Bedford
- 1997-2001 David Thomas Peebles, David Patent, John Scott (Priests-in-Charge)
- 2002-18 Kevin John Scully
- 2019–present Erin Marie Clark
