= Enid Stacy =

English socialist activist

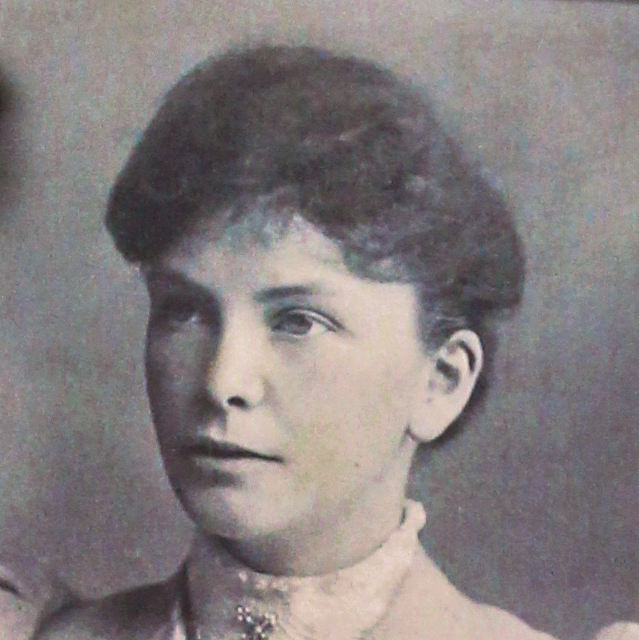
- Born: 10 June 1868; Westbury, Gloucestershire, England
- Died: 4 September 1903 (aged 35); Littleborough, Lancashire, England
- Education: Redland High School for Girls University College Bristol
- Occupation: Activist
- Political party: Independent Labour Party
- Movement: Christian socialism; trade unionism
- Spouse: Percy Widdrington (m. 1897)

Enid Stacy (10 June 1868 – 4 September 1903) was an English socialist activist.

Stacy was born on 10 June 1868 in Westbury, Gloucestershire, the eldest of the Irish painter Henry Stacy and his wife Rose Deeley's four children. The family moved to Bristol in 1881. She was raised in a Christian socialist household; her brother helped found the Bristol and Clifton Christian Socialist Society and her father later became involved with the Bristol Socialist Society. She went to school at Redland High School for Girls, before passing her matriculation exam for the University of London in 1887. She studied at University College Bristol, which was affiliated to University of London, receiving a Catherine Winkworth Scholarship in 1888. She received her London BA in 1990, the University of London being then the only UK university to offer degrees to women. She joined the teaching staff of Redland High School for Girls in 1891. There, she met Katharine St John Conway, with whom she shared an interest in John Ruskin and Anglo-Catholicism.

In 1889, there was a wave of strikes in Bristol and Stacy was convinced by a speech of Tom Mann to become involved, but after she spoke at a meeting which had been banned, she lost her job. Instead, she joined the National Union of Gas Workers and General Labourers as an organiser, leading strikes among cotton workers and confectionery workers, and becoming honorary secretary of the Association for the Promotion of Trade Unionism Among Women.

Over time, Stacy came to focus more on lecturing, initially for the Fabian Society and the Labour Church, then from 1893 for the new Independent Labour Party (ILP). That year, she spent some time living in the Starnthwaite colony for the unemployed, but they were soon evicted. From 1895, she worked full-time for the ILP, serving on its national administrative council from 1896 to 1899. She challenged Keir Hardie for the chairship of the ILP in 1898.

Stacy also wrote frequently for The Clarion and joined the National Union of Women's Suffrage Societies. In 1896, she met the Anglo-Catholic vicar Percy Widdrington at the International Congress of Socialists. They married the following May, initially living in Newcastle upon Tyne, then later in Calderbrook. Even after having a child, Stacy spent six months of the year travelling and lecturing on socialist and feminist topics, until she died suddenly on 4 September 1903.
