= Doris Brabham Hatt =

British artist

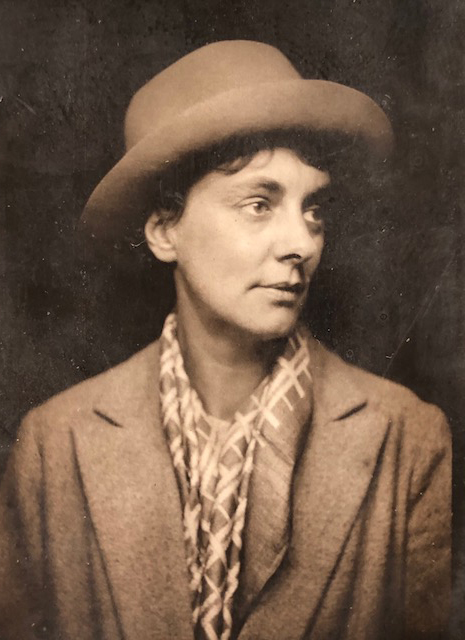
- Doris Hatt c.1930 (private collection)
- Born: 24 September 1890; Bath, England
- Died: 27 August 1969 (aged 78); Weston-super-Mare, England
- Education: Bath School of Art; Goldsmiths College; Royal College of Art
- Known for: Painting, printmaking

Doris Brabham Hatt (24 September 1890 – 27 August 1969), a painter and printmaker, was a pioneer of Modernism in Britain.

== Biography ==
=== Early life ===
Doris Brabham Hatt was born in 1890 into an affluent Bath family that ran a successful wig-making, hairdressing and perfumery business. She was the daughter of William Edward Hatt (1861-1916) and Mary Emily Hatt (née Brabham) (1862–1929), who was a music teacher and Professor of Pianoforte. Her older sister, Rayonette Dagmar Hatt (1889–1911) died young, and she also had a younger brother, Richard William Hatt (1893–1933), who became a journalist. Doris's parents and sister are buried at St Mary the Virgin, Bathwick, Smallcombe Cemetery.

After attending Bath High School, Hatt went to a finishing school at Kassel in Germany from 1906 to 1907. She was impressed by the paintings she saw in the Neue Gallerie and she decided to pursue a career in art. She studied at the Bath School of Art from 1911 to 1914 then at Goldsmiths College in London until 1916 and at the Royal College of Art, London during 1919. She also took woodcut classes at the Vienna Art School for Women and Girls during stays with her brother, Richard, who was assigned to the city in the early 1920s. At this time she also made the first of what were to become many visits to Paris, frequenting the same circles as Picasso and Fernand Léger.

=== Clevedon and Littlemead ===
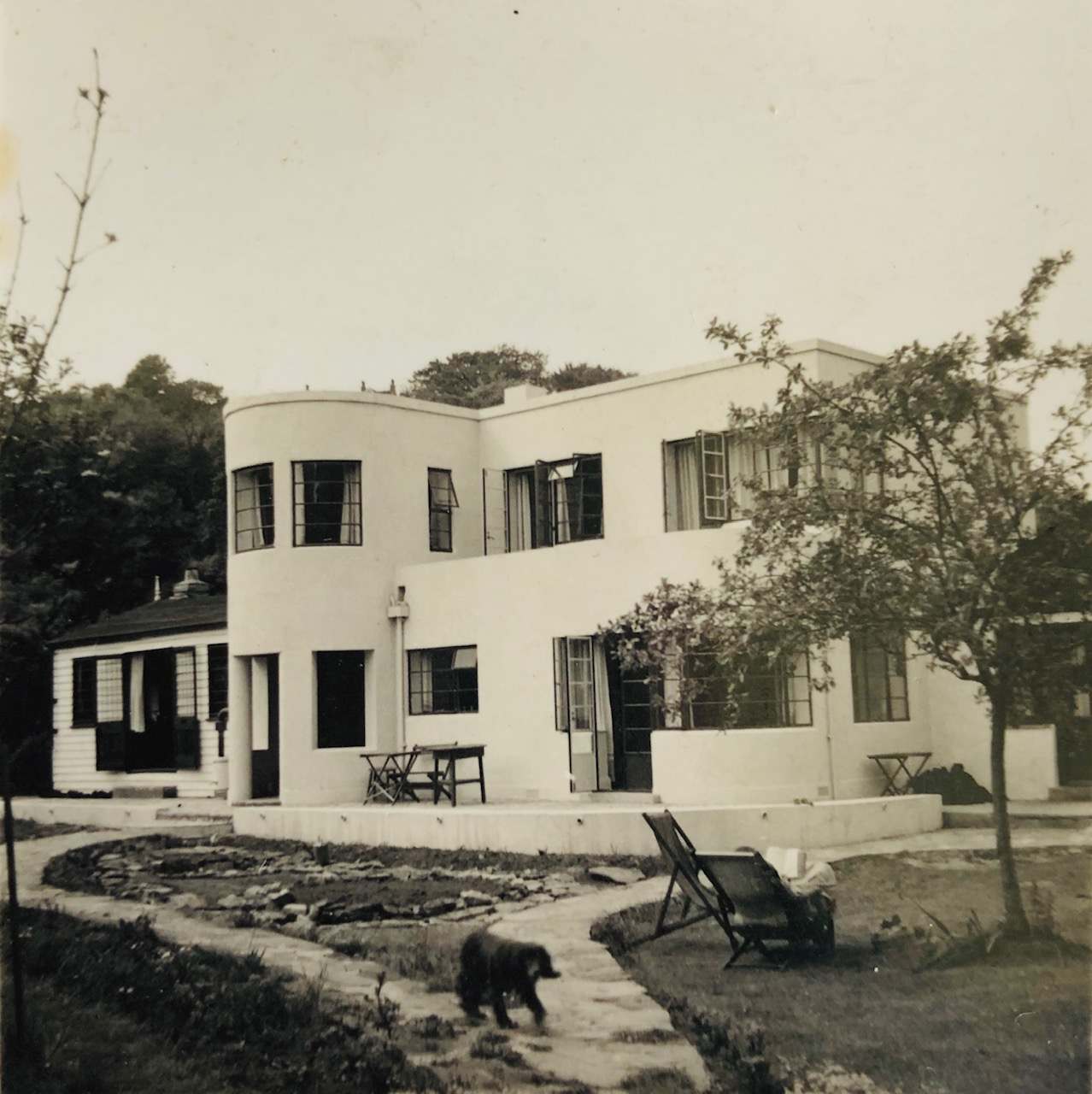
Littlemead, Clevedon, 1939 (private collection)

Hatt lived in Clevedon, Somerset. After World War I, she moved to Clevedon with her mother. They bought a plot of land at the northern fringe of the town and arranged for an ex-army wooden building to be moved there and converted to a bungalow with a veranda front. This became Littlemead. In 1938 a family inheritance from a maiden aunt allowed her to design and have built a Bauhaus / Art Deco house, which survives today as an example of a Modernist house. Littlemead was a meeting place for radical activity in both arts and politics, and hosted free art classes for children and adults and gave lectures on art.

=== Politics ===
Hatt was a socialist and feminist activist. Her political awakenings came while she was in London during the World War I, where she witnessed degrees of poverty she had not seen in Bath and also the plight of returning soldiers, including the deaths of two cousins killed in France. She was also aware of the women's suffrage and New Woman movements and the combination of these influences, with her developing opposition to the war and conscription in 1916, caused her to commit to socialism and she joined the Independent Labour Party in 1917. In response to the rise of Fascism in the 1930s, Hatt joined the Communist Party of Great Britain in the 1930s. Two years later, in 1937, she and her partner, Margery Mack Smith, visited Russia for the Pushkin Centenary Jubilee celebrations in Leningrad and Moscow.

In 1946 and 1947 Hatt stood as a Communist Party candidate for Clevedon Urban District Council, at a time when there were no women council members, and was unsuccessful on both occasions. Nonetheless, Hatt and Smith continued to host Sunday afternoon discussion meetings that were attended by left-wing progressives from the arts, academia, politics, the theatre and journalism. She was often seen in Clevedon trying to sell Daily Worker newspapers to local people.

Fishing Boats, Cadaqués oil painting 1965 by Doris Hatt, with DH65 monogram

=== Art ===
In 1915, while at Goldsmiths College, London, Hatt designed a First World War recruiting poster, featuring St George and the Dragon. It was successful in a competition organised by the Parliamentary Recruiting Committee, becoming 'poster no. 108' with a first print run of 50,000 and a second run later that year.

Hatt first exhibited her paintings with the International Society of Sculptors, Painters and Gravers at the Grosvenor Gallery, London, in 1918. Her work was initially influenced by the way the French modernist movement was being interpreted in Britain by artists such as Paul Nash, John Nash, Iain Macnab and Ethelbert White, but as she began to travel, for example, to Paris, and was able to see pictures by Paul Cézanne, Pablo Picasso and Georges Braque at first hand, the influence of Modernism deepened. After her visits to Vienna in the early 1920s she produced a small number of woodcuts and wood engravings from 1925, but there were none after 1930.

By the mid-1930s Hatt had developed her own distinctive style, seen particularly in her landscapes. The joint Braque/Roualt exhibition at the Tate, London, in 1946 and then that for Fernand Léger in 1950 both brought a new impetus, imagination and energy to her work. She would often return to a composition - sometimes over decades - and explore it with increasing degrees of simplification and abstraction of its elements.

Hatt exhibited her work for five decades, featuring in over 40 exhibitions (many of them solo) in Clevedon, Clifton, Bath, Oxford, London and Paris. Particular exhibition venues included the Royal Academy, the Leicester and Redfern Galleries, Jack Bilbo's Modern Art Gallery and Foyles Gallery. Hatt had a series of solo shows at the Minerva Gallery in Bath and at the Osiris Gallery in Oxford.

Foyles was Hatt's first solo exhibition in London and it was opened by Douglas Cleverdon. He observed, "It seems to me that here is a world of order and construction very carefully conceived and carrying on the best traditions of the post impressionists. In particular one sees the influence of such French painters as Léger, but there is not only the French influence, but also the clear English influence as well." In his review of the exhibition John Berger also acknowledged the influence of Léger on Hatt and added, "She has a good sense of colour and has something to say..." Hatt was elected an associate of the Royal West of England Academy (RWA) in 1949.

== Personal life ==
Her lifelong partner was Margery Mack Smith (1890-1975), a weaver, and primary school teacher.

It is thanks to Smith that a number of Hatt's sketchbooks and folios of working drawings have been preserved. Soon after Hatt died on 27 August 1969, a significant quantity of her correspondence and personal records were burned by a relative to conceal her life as a feminist and a lesbian. Two chests of material had already been moved to Smith's home in Watchet and were preserved.

== Death and legacy ==
When Hatt died, in keeping with her wish, her body was donated to medical research. She has no memorial beyond her art.

From March–June 2019 a major retrospective exhibition featuring over 70 of her paintings was held at the Museum of Somerset in Taunton.

A small exhibition of watercolours, prints and drawings was staged in June 2021 as part of the Clevedon Literary Festival.
