= Conrad Noel =

English Anglo-Catholic priest and Christian socialist (1869-1942)

The Reverend Conrad Noel
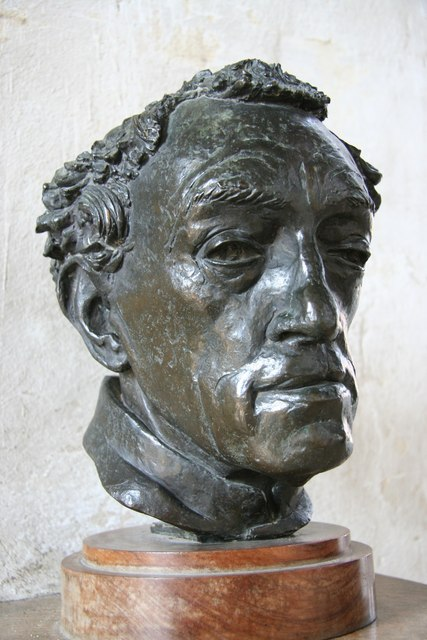
- Noel's memorial in Thaxted church
- Born: Conrad le Despenser Roden Noel; 12 July 1869; Kew, London, England
- Died: 22 July 1942 (aged 73); Thaxted, England
- Education: Chichester Theological College
- Spouse: Miriam Greenwood (m. 1894)
- Parents: Alice Noel; Roden Noel
- Religion: Christianity (Anglican)
- Church: Church of England
- Ordained: 1894 (deacon); ? (priest)
- Offices held: Vicar of Thaxted

Conrad le Despenser Roden Noel (12 July 1869 – 22 July 1942) was an English priest of the Church of England. Known as the 'Red Vicar' of Thaxted, he was a prominent Christian socialist.

== Early life ==
Noel was born on 12 July 1869 in Royal Cottage, Kew Green, London, the eldest son of the poet and essayist Roden Noel, who served as Groom of the Privy Chamber, and his wife Alice Maria Caroline Noel (née de Broë). His paternal grandfather was Charles Noel, 1st Earl of Gainsborough, and his paternal grandmother Lady Gainsborough was a lady-in-waiting to Queen Victoria. Noel's parents were both Anglican, though in his youth, Noel repudiated the Calvinism of his mother and attended higher-church services with his father.

He was educated at Wellington College and at Cheltenham College, then also an all-boys public school. He then entered Corpus Christi College, Cambridge in 1888, but was rusticated (suspended) for a year and chose not to return to complete his degree.

== Career ==
=== Ecclesiastical career ===
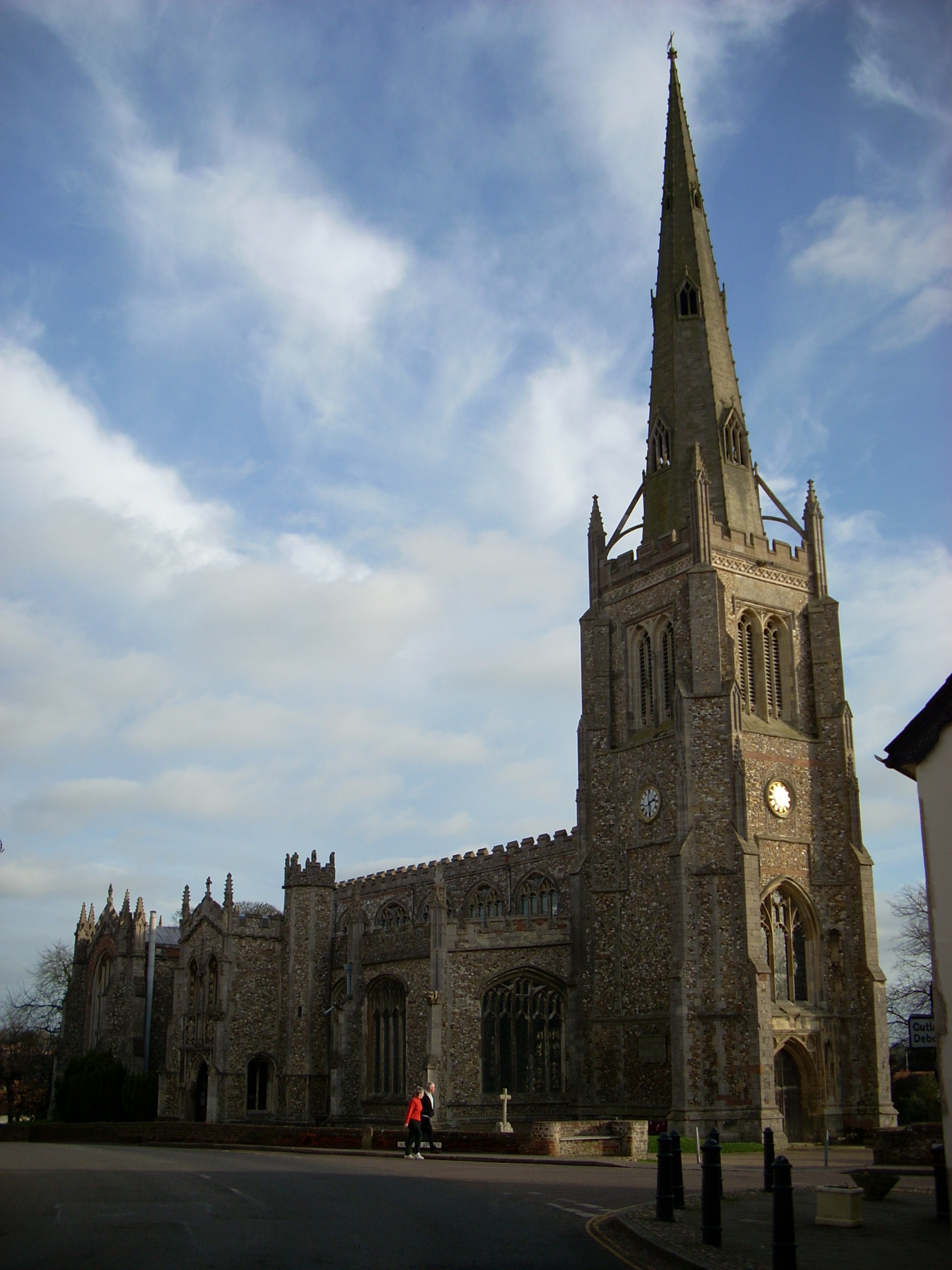
St John's Church, Thaxted

Noel underwent training for ordination at Chichester Theological College, an Anglo-Catholic theological school. At first he was refused ordination into the Church of England because of his theological views: he had been offered a curacy at All Saints Church in Plymouth, but on the day on which he was scheduled to be ordained, the Bishop of Exeter refused to ordain him.

In 1894, he was ordained deacon in the Diocese of Chester and became a curate in Flowery Field, Cheshire, but left following parishioners' objections to his socialism. He also spent time as a curate at St Philip's in Newcastle, under W. E. Moll. Also in 1894, he married Miriam Greenwood. In late 1904 he became assistant priest to Percy Dearmer at Primrose Hill.

In 1910, he became the vicar of Thaxted, Essex presented by the patron of the living Daisy Greville, Countess of Warwick, who was herself a socialist.

Within Thaxted Parish Church, Noel hung the red flag and the tricolour flag of Sinn Féin alongside the flag of Saint George. This led to the "Battle of the Flags" with students from Cambridge leading attacks on the church to remove the flags. Eventually, in 1922 a consistory court ruled against displaying the flags and Noel obeyed the ruling.

He founded the socialist organization Catholic Crusade in 1918, which had some impact in the origins of Trotskyism in Britain.

On Noel's perspective on the Middle Ages, which was similar to that of William Morris and John Ruskin, Reginald Groves wrote:

He himself had drawn much inspiration from the Middle Ages only because he felt that this period, despite many oppressions, had a certain vigour and freedom which expressed itself in communal life; and he borrowed much from the ancient English uses and ceremonials for the worship at Thaxted. But he adapted the ideas and usages to contemporary needs, and he formulated his rediscovery to make of it an outward expression of the newly aroused modern movement for social justice.

=== Politics ===
Having become a socialist shortly after finishing his university studies, he joined the Social Democratic Federation. He joined the Independent Labour Party, but in 1911 became a member of the newly formed British Socialist Party.

Noel also supported the British Provisional Committee for the Defence of Leon Trotsky, and signed a letter defending Trotsky's right to asylum and calling for an international inquiry into the Moscow Trials.

== Personal life ==
He was a friend of the composer Gustav Holst who also lived for some years in the town of Thaxted.

He died of cancer on 22 July 1942 aged 73. A sculpture by Gertrude Hermes is in Thaxted church.

== Publications ==
- Ought Christians to be Socialists?, 1909. Transcript of a debate with the Christadelphian Frank Jannaway.
- Socialism in Church History. London: Frank Palmer, 1910.
- The Life of Jesus. London: J. M. Dent & Sons, 1937.
- Jesus the Heretic. London: J. M. Dent & Sons, 1939

== See also ==
- John Groser
- Stewart Headlam
- Liberal Anglo-Catholicism
