= Percy Widdrington =

English minister and socialist activist

Percy Elborough Tinling Widdrington (5 June 1873 – 13 February 1959) was a British socialist activist and religious minister.

== Life ==
Born in Southampton, Widdrington studied at St Edmund Hall, Oxford, where he co-founded the university Fabian Society and also joined the Independent Labour Party. He met Enid Stacy, and married her in 1897. That year, he was ordained as an Anglican priest, and began working at St Philip's Church, in a deprived area of the city. In 1901, the couple relocated to Calderbrook in Lancashire, but Stacy died in 1903.

Following Stacy's death, Widdrington became a curate in Halton-with-Aughton. The vicar was J. H. Hastings, who with Widdrington and others founded the Church Socialist League. In 1906, Widdrington was appointed as vicar at St Peter's Church in Coventry. There, he became active in the women's suffrage movement, supporting the Women's Social and Political Union (WSPU) and in particular local activist Alice Lea. In 1911, Widdrington married Helen Dawson, joint secretary of the local WSPU branch, who he had originally met in Calderbrook.

In 1918, Widdrington moved to become vicar at St John and St Giles' Church, Great Easton in Essex. In 1922, he co-authored Return of Christendom, which argued for the combatting of individualism and moral decay which the authors saw as caused by capitalism. This led, in 1923, to the dissolution of the Church Socialist League and its replacement with the League of the Kingdom of God. The new league endured but did not grow, and Widdrington gradually became less prominent. He died in Lichfield in 1959.
