= Dundry Hill =

Hill in Somerset, England

Coordinates: 51.39756°N 2.64391°W

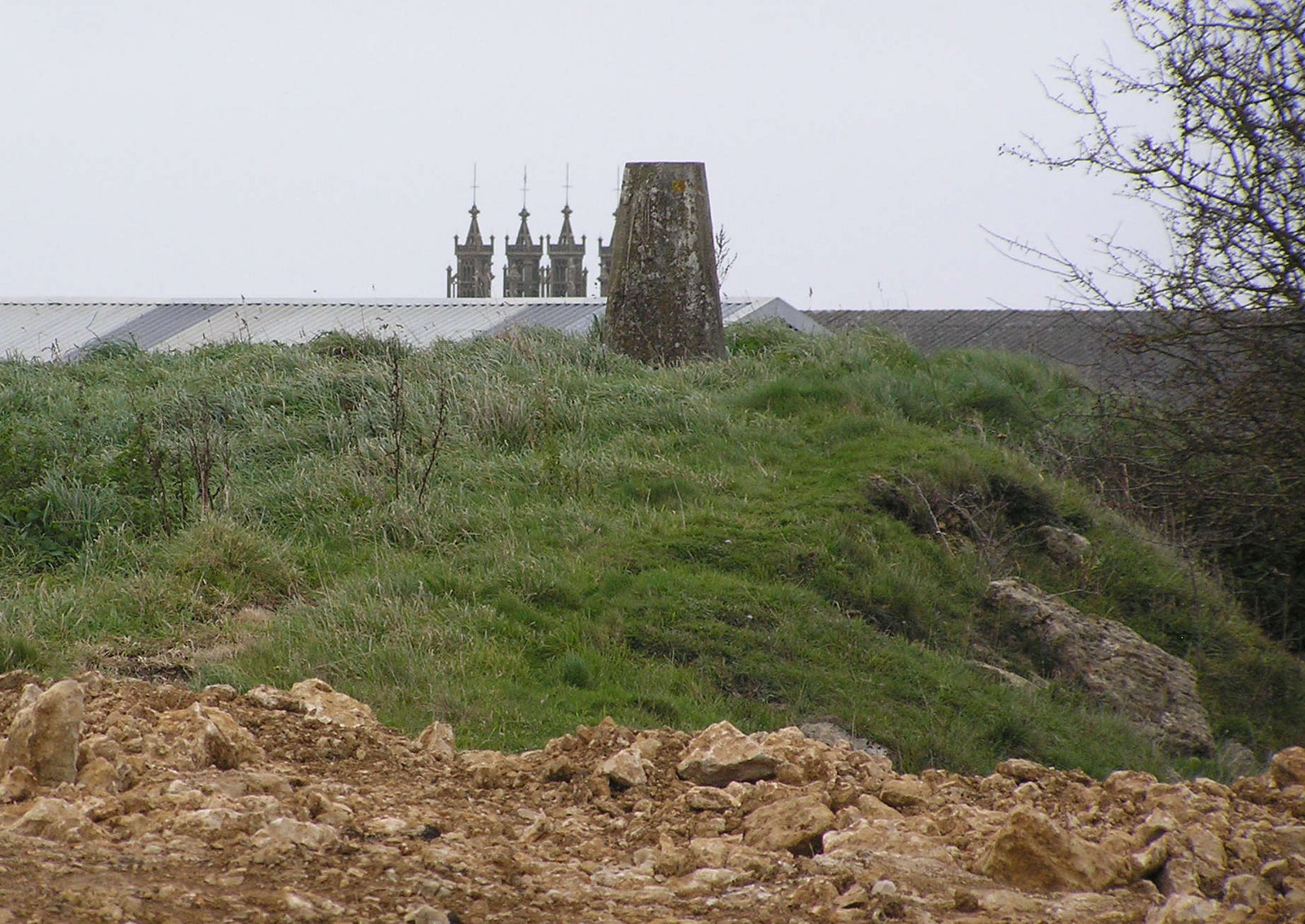
- The Trig point at the top of Dundry Hill with the top of the tower of Church of St Michael, Dundry in the background

Highest point
- Elevation: 223 m (732 ft)
- Prominence: 170 m (560 ft)
- Parent peak: Beacon Batch
- Listing: Marilyn

Geography
- Location: North part of the Mendip Hills, England
- OS grid: ST553667
- Topo map: OS Landrangers 172, 182

Dundry Hill is immediately south of Bristol, England: it includes farmland, a small number of houses and a church. It stretches east–west for some 2 miles (3 km). Most of the hill is within the district of North Somerset. At the hill's eastern end the southern slopes are within Bath and North East Somerset, and the northern slopes are within the city and county of Bristol, including the highest point in that county.

The village of Dundry, with its prominent church, is near the summit. At the eastern end is Maes Knoll, near Norton Malreward, an Iron Age hillfort and the start of Wansdyke. To the South lies the Chew Valley.

On the western side of the hill is a spring which becomes the Land Yeo.

Dundry Main Road South Quarry is a 0.7 hectare geological Site of Special Scientific Interest near the village of East Dundry, because of the number of fossils in the inferior oolite. The Main Road Quarry exposes a fine section in the Middle and Upper Inferior Oolite, with the rocks lying stratigraphically below them visible at Barns Batch Spinney. The former characterised by a typically southern English-Normandy fauna, including the rich ammonite occurrences of the "Brown iron-shot", and the latter by contrasting faunas of Cotswold aspect. This contrast is direct evidence for movements of the Mendip Axis in Middle Jurassic times, making this an outstanding site for its bearing on studies of palaeogeography.
