= Economy of Bermuda =

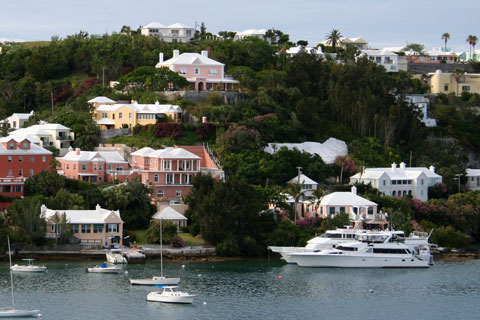
- Houses in Bermuda
- Currency: Bermudian dollar (BMD, $)
- Fiscal year: Calendar year

Statistics
- Population: ▼63,680 (1 July 2026 projection)
- GDP: ▲$8.980 billion (nominal, 2024); ▲$7.738 billion (PPP, 2024)
- GDP growth: ▼ -6.8% (2020); ▲4.6% (2021); ▲6.5% (2022); ▲4.9% (2023); ▲2.1% (2024)
- GDP per capita: ▲$138,935 (nominal, 2024); ▲$119,719 (PPP, 2024)
- GDP by sector: Agriculture: 0.2%; Industry: 4.6%; Services: 91.5%; (2023 est.)
- Inflation (CPI): 1.5% (2021); 4.0% (2022); 3.3% (2023)
- Labour force: ▲37,629 (May 2023); ▲81.4% employment rate (May 2023)
- Unemployment: ▼2.5% (May 2023); ▲15.1% youth unemployment (May 2023)
- Average gross salary: ▲$70,238 yearly (2023)
- All values, unless otherwise stated, are in US dollars.

Bermuda is a British Overseas Territory comprising a number of islands, with an area of 54 km^{2} (20.8 sq mi), located in the North Atlantic Ocean, which in 2016 had a population of 65,331.

Bermuda has the fourth highest per capita income in the world, primarily fueled by offshore financial services for non-resident firms, especially offshore insurance and reinsurance, and tourism. In 2014, 584,702 tourists visited the territory. Tourism accounts for an estimated 28% of gross domestic product (GDP), 85% of which is from North America. The industrial sector is small, and agriculture is severely limited by a lack of suitable land. About 80% of food is imported. International business contributes over 60% of Bermuda's economic output. A failed independence vote in late 1995 can be partially attributed to Bermudian fears of scaring away foreign firms. Government economic priorities are for further strengthening of the tourist and international financial sectors.

== History ==
=== Early-season vegetable exports to USA before World War II ===
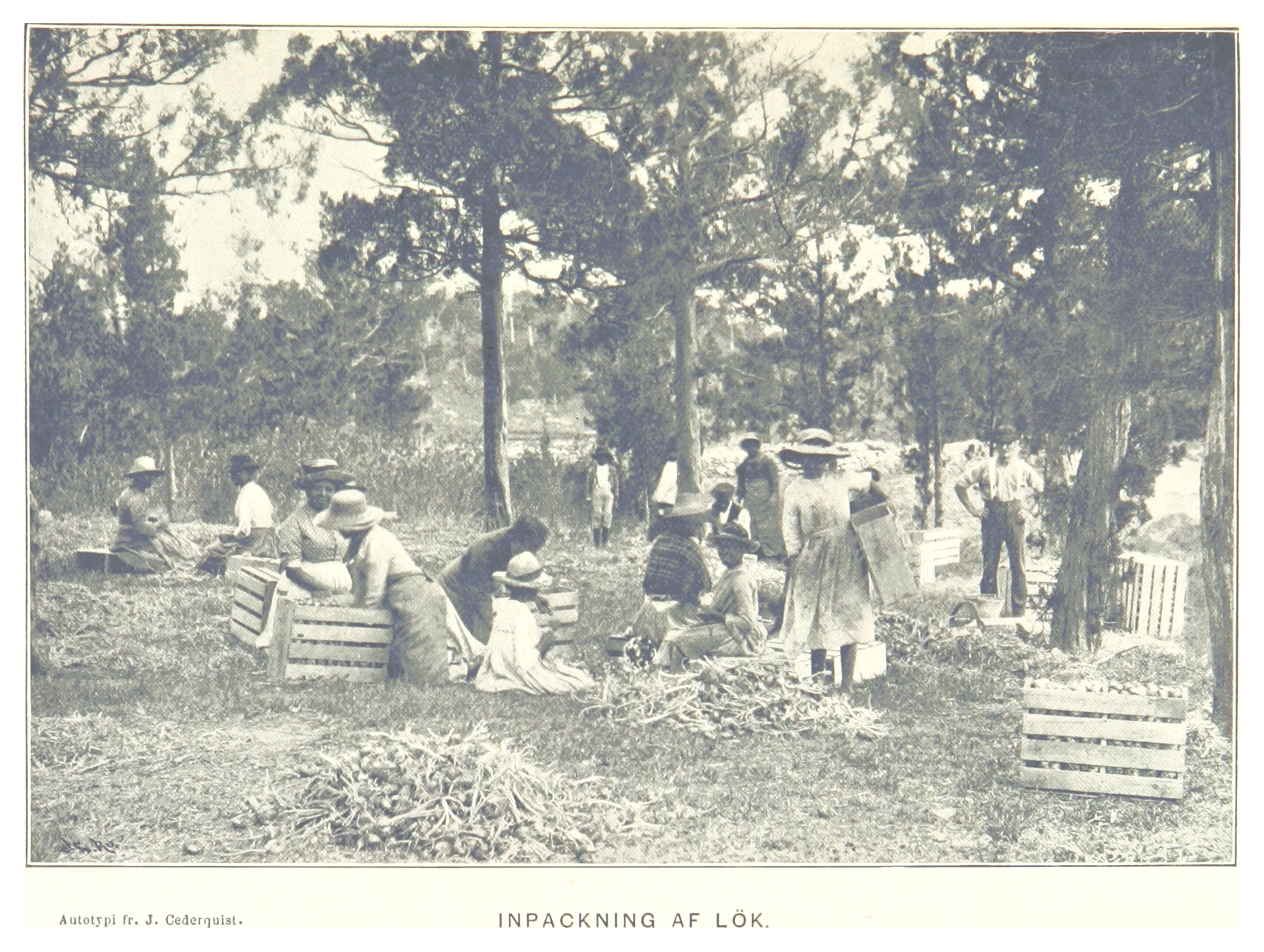
Onion cultivations on Bermuda, 1895

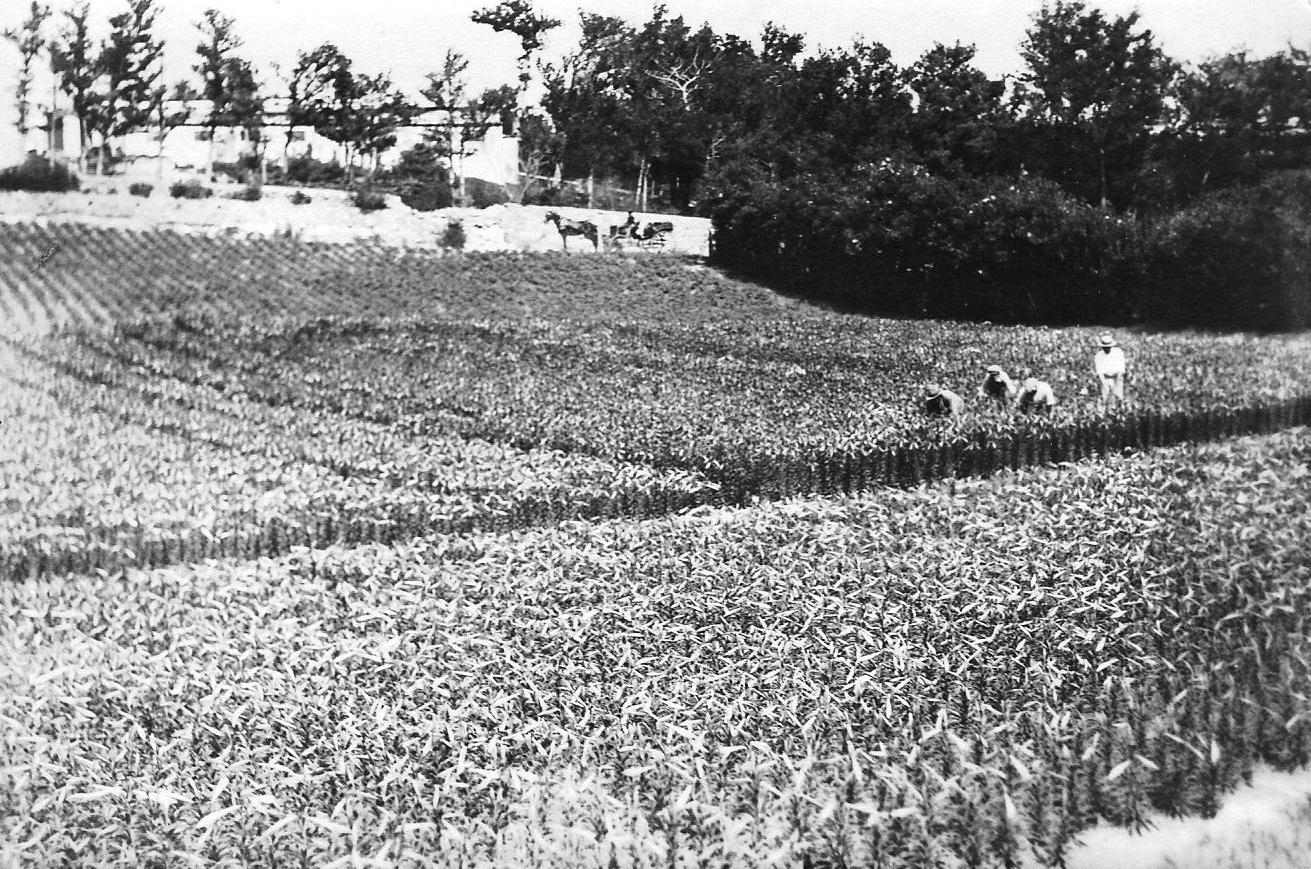
One of the over 200 Bermuda lily fields in 1926

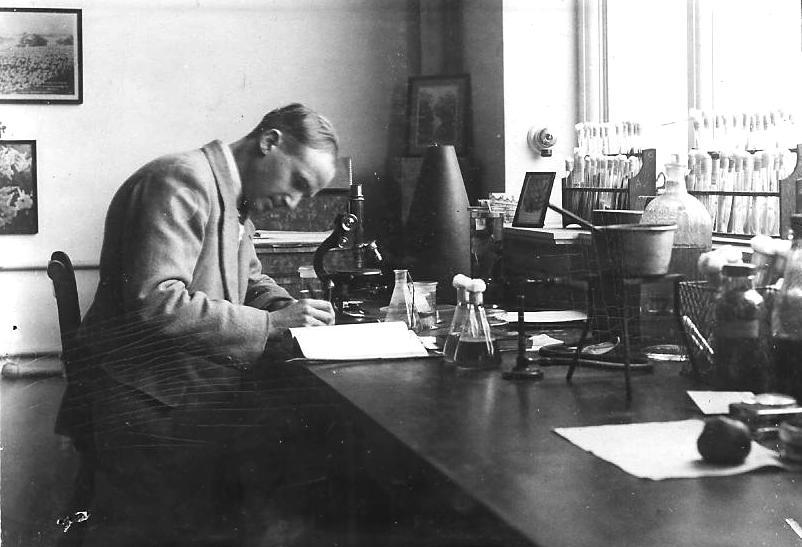
Lawrence Ogilvie in his laboratory

The major Bermudian industry since the 1800s was the export by sea of early vegetables and flowers to New York: Bermuda had three crops per year. The Bermuda Botanic Gardens (now with 38 acres) had been established in 1898.

In 1922, complete, concise and clear acts dealing with agriculture were placed on the Bermudian statute book; inspection of produce was initiated; and seed testing began. Local seedsmen were registered in 1923. Mr McCallan, the Agricultural Director, reorganised the Agricultural Exhibition for 1923. Seed potatoes were gradually improved after much investigation with US experts. A local farmers' market started in 1923. For a year in 1921–23, Professor H H Whetzel of Cornell University advised remedies for the cash crop diseases of potato blight, onion thrips, celery leaf spot, lily Botritis, and melon mildew. He suggested that the colony should appoint a full-time plant pathologist. During this time, exports of agricultural products to the United States contributed the most to Bermuda's economy.

Lawrence Ogilvie from Scotland was the Government's plant pathologist from September 1923 to April 1928. He introduced regulations in 1924 governing the control of local diseases and pests, and the import of plants – so vital for an island. Import embargoes applied for banana plants, lily bulbs, sweet potatoes, citrus fruits from the West Indies, and certain Irish potatoes. In 1924 a concrete fumigation chamber was built to fumigate infected imports. Good crops of celery were achieved in the 1920s. Citrus cultivation was affected by the Mediterranean fruit fly and only really developed in 1944.

=== 1890s to 1920s ===
The early Easter-lily bulb exports to New York and the Isle of Man – high-value and vital financially to Bermuda – became badly diseased from the late 19th century to the mid-1920s. In 1924 Lawrence Ogilvie (age 25) saved the industry by identifying the problem as a virus (not aphid damage as previously thought) and instituting controls in the fields and packing houses. There was a marked improvement in exporting 23 cases of lily bulbs in 1918 to 6043 cases in 1927 from the then 204 lily fields. Still in his 20s, Ogilvie was professionally honoured by an article in Nature. The lily export trade continued to flourish until the 1940s when the Japanese captured much of the market.

=== After World War II ===
Bermuda has had steady economic prosperity since the end of World War II, although the island has experienced recessions, including during the early 1990s, when the contraction of the economy led to a population reduction of 2,000 people (with work permits of many long-term residents not being renewed), and a mild recession in 2001–02, both paralleling recessions in the United States. Its economy is based primarily upon international business (especially re-insurance, for which it is now a world centre) and tourism, with those two sectors accounting for more than 70% of the total balance of payments current account foreign exchange receipts. However, the role of international business in the economy is expanding, whereas that of tourism is contracting.

== Current economy ==
The Bermuda Monetary Authority (BMA) is an independent regulator of Bermuda's financial services sector, including the Bermuda Stock Exchange. The BMA is not a central bank, and does not provide lender of last resort facilities. The BMA has licensed four local banks: Butterfield Bank, Clarien Bank, Bermuda Commercial Bank and the HSBC Bank Bermuda. Bermuda's currency is the Bermudian dollar, which is pegged to the US dollar on a one-to-one basis. Both currencies circulate in Bermuda on an equal basis, but the Bermudian dollar is not normally traded outside the territory. In May 2020 the Bermuda Government's debt stood at $2.68 billion and the debt limit was increased to $2.9 billion in response to COVID-19 related expenditures. The BMA implemented Basel II in Bermuda from 1 January 2009 and Basel III from 1 January 2015, combined becoming the final rules for the enhancement of capital adequacy and liquidity in Bermuda's banking sector.

In 2000, 19% of the population lived below the poverty line. The inflation rate (consumer prices) in 2005 was 2.8%. In 2004, 19% of the total labour force of 38,360 was in clerical occupations, 22% services, 3% labourers, 17% professional and technical, 15% administrative and managerial, 19% sales, and 3% agriculture and fishing; there was an unemployment rate of 2.1%.

In 2006, Bermuda's exports (mostly reexports of pharmaceuticals) were valued at $783m; export partners included Spain (13.8%), Germany (11.7%), Switzerland (8.8%), Denmark (6.6%), and the UK (6%).

In 2007, imports (of clothing, fuels, machinery and transport equipment, construction materials, chemicals, food, and live animals) were valued at $1.162bn; import partners included South Korea (36.4%), the US (15.7%), Germany (13.2%) and Italy (11.8%).

In 2018, Bermuda had a GDP of $7.263bn, and the GDP per capita was $111,540, with a real growth rate of 1.7%. In 2018 (est.), agriculture contributed 0.3% to GDP, industry 5%, and services 94.2%. In 2018/19 actual government revenues were $1,090 million with a deficit of $77.8 million after $58.6 million capital expenditure The major sources of Government revenue were: $467 million payroll tax and $226 million customs duties. Between 2008 and 2014 debt rose by 20% or more every year. By 2020 net borrowings were $2.586 billion. In September 2020 it was reported that "Bermuda faces a fiscal cliff if its debt-to-revenue ratio, currently at 340 per cent, continues to rise." Annual debt interest is $127.1 million. $354 million of debt matured in January 2023. A further $402 million of debt matured in February 2024.

As of 2024, the GDP at constant purchaser's prices of Bermuda was $7.1 billion, up by 1.9% from the previous year.

== Offshore financial services ==
Bermuda is considered an offshore financial centre. According to the Foot report, Bermuda is the second largest captive insurance domicile, and is the third largest reinsurance centre in the world. It is the domicile of 6% of offshore funds (at 2010) and has a presence in aircraft registration and maintains an open ship registry.

An October 2000 KPMG report titled "Review of Financial Regulation in the Caribbean Overseas Territories and Bermuda" stated that the island's legislative framework was not compliant with international standards, which led critics to conclude that Bermuda is committed to the facilitation of money laundering and other financial crimes. The Bermuda Government has since signed tax transparency and compliance agreements with the United States and Seychelles.

In response to the KPMG October 2000 report, Bermuda enacted the Trust (Regulation of Trust Business) Act 2001 to transfer the finance minister's responsibilities to the BMA, with respect to granting and revoking trust company licences. It also requires all individuals or companies operating trust companies to have a licence unless they are exempt. Previously, only trust companies needed a licence. Additionally, the legislation gives the BMA more comprehensive intervention powers. It will be able to request more detailed documentation and, in the event of a problem, restrict a trust operator's licence. Information should be kept confidential, except in the event of a criminal investigation.

Comprehensive new legislation will be introduced in the upcoming parliamentary session to further streamline the incorporation process, facilitate registration of foreign names and address conflicts in law for registered securities, again consistent with the KPMG report. Amendments are being proposed to the BMA (Collective Investment Scheme Classification) Regulations 1998, part of a strategic plan for the development of financial services in Bermuda.

== Foreign companies ==
Most foreign companies in Bermuda are incorporated under the Companies Act of 1981. Bermuda-registered companies need only one director and one shareholder, who can be the same person, and neither needs to be resident in Bermuda. Most companies do not need to file financial accounts or annual returns. Business records can be maintained outside the territory. A company need only file an annual declaration, which lists the authorized share capital, which is the basis for determining the annual fee. (See Taxation in Bermuda#Licence fees.) Foreign companies require a local secretary and agent, which charges a fee. Foreign companies that wish to establish a place of business in Bermuda require a permit, but a permit is not required for offshore activities. There are no taxes on profits, income, dividends, capital gains, estate, or death duties.

There are more than 12,500 foreign companies registered in Bermuda, many US-owned, which are an important source of foreign exchange for the island. Offshore companies spent US$967m in Bermuda in 2000. Total income, including secondary effects, was US$1.3bn. Many large international companies are based in Bermuda, including Bacardi Ltd., Bunge Limited, Jardine Matheson Holdings Ltd., Global Crossing Ltd. and Royall Lyme Bermuda Ltd. Some companies, however, are considering or planning a move to Ireland in search of "a more stable environment", including Willis Group.

The growing importance of international business is reflected in its increased share of GDP, which grew from 12.6% in 1996 to 13.8% in 2000. In 2000, foreign companies directly employed 3,224 Bermudians and non-Bermudians. Foreign companies directly and indirectly supported 9,450 jobs in Bermuda and strongly influenced a further 4,670.

The Bermuda Department of Maritime Administration maintains an open ship registry, enabling foreign-owned ships to be registered in Bermuda, fly its flag, and be subject to its maritime and taxation laws. It is considered a flag of convenience state. In 2012, 139 vessels were registered in Bermuda of which 105 were foreign-owned (76%). 160 ships were registered in 2017, including 18 oil tankers, 10 bulk carriers, 8 container ships, and one general cargo ship. Thirteen of the 17 ships of the Princess Cruises line are registered in Bermuda, as are seven of the eight ships of the P&O Cruises line. In 2011, the Cunard Line registered all its ships in Bermuda to enable its ship captains to marry couples at sea, weddings at sea being described as a lucrative market. The move brought in additional hundreds of thousands in annual fees to a registry that already takes in about $3 million a year.

Bermuda is notable for its open aircraft register.

== Tourism ==
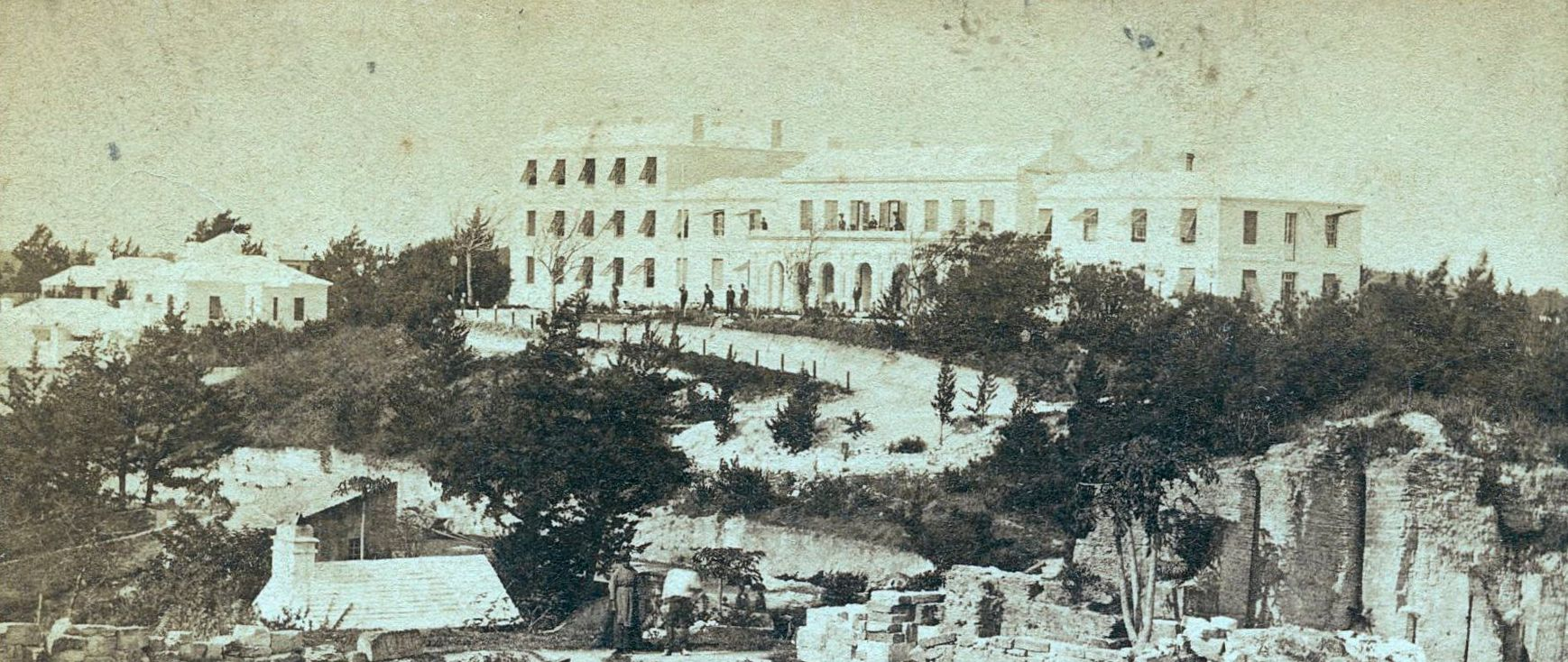
The Hamilton Hotel in 1875

Tourism is Bermuda's third most important industry. That it is an industry in trouble is evident from the statistical comparison. In 1996, Bermuda had 571,700 visitors. By 2000, that figure has dropped to 538,059 visitors, and further decreased to 454,444 visitors in 2001. Bed nights sold declined from over 2.4 million in 1995 to 1.9 million in 2001. Visitors contributed an estimated $475 million to the economy in 1996, but that figure declined to $431 million in 2000. Direct employment in the tourism industry (5,700 jobs in 2000) and related industry is dropping in tandem with declining visitor numbers.

Following the September 11, 2001, attacks in the United States, a number of new re-insurance companies located to the island, contributing to an already robust international business sector. On the other hand, Bermuda's already weakening tourism industry was hit hard, as American tourists chose not to travel.

Total arrivals in 2014 were 584,702 out of which air arrivals were 224,329 (down by 5.1%), cruise arrivals were 356,093 (up by 4.7%), and yacht arrivals were 4,280 (up by 24.6%).

In 2018, Bermuda experienced its most visitor arrivals ever with a record number of 770,683 visitor arrivals. With 203,697 leisure air arrivals in 2018, Bermuda experienced its best performance since 2002, a year which recorded 218,248 leisure travellers by air. Total leisure spending between air and cruise was $411 million in 2018, up from $320 million in 2017. Cruise arrivals were also up by 34% in 2018 for non-summer months (September through May).

== Population and labour ==
The population of Bermuda on census night, 20 May 2010, was 71,328 persons (an increase of 7% over 2000), comprising 59,014 civilians, 822 persons in institutions and 11,492 visitors and transients (an increase of 38%), including those on board cruise ships and yachts. There were 64,319 persons usually resident in Bermuda (i.e., including those temporarily out of the territory), an increase of 4% or 2,178 persons. About 79% of Bermuda's 2010 resident population has Bermudian status and 21% does not. Bermudian status arises by birth, grant or marriage. There were three cruise ships in Bermuda on census night compared to one at the 2000 census. According to the 1991 census, about 73% of Bermuda's 1991 resident population was born in Bermuda and 27% was foreign-born. UK immigrants constituted 30.6% of the immigrant population; U.S., 19.9%; Canada, 10.5%; and Portugal and the Azores, 13.5%. In 2016, Bermuda had a resident population of 65,331.

Total filled jobs in 2000 were 38,017, but preliminary estimates for 2001 revealed a 1.1% decline in employment. Nevertheless, unemployment remained in the 4% range, and many Bermudians held more than one job. In 2000, about 25% of workers were union members. There are three primary unions in Bermuda: the blue-collar Bermuda Industrial Union, Bermuda's largest labour organisation; the professional Bermuda Public Services Association, with a steadily increasing membership; and the Bermuda Union of Teachers, which is affiliated with the Caribbean Union of Teachers.

Organised labour enjoys a high profile in Bermuda. Union action, however, was moderate in recent years. The average days lost per worker involved dropped from a high of 65 in 1991 to a low of 0.8 in 1999. Although still active, unions have tempered their demands, partly as a result of new labour legislation and partly in recognition that Bermuda's economy, in line with that of the United States, entered a recessionary phase in 2001. The island's tourism industry, in which many Bermudians have historically been employed, continues to experience tough times, made even worse by 11 September. Past industrial action in the tourism sector hurt that industry, which was already suffering a chronic downturn without the additional blow of tourist displeasure and displacement due to work stoppages.

== Foreign trade ==
Exports of Bermuda by product category (2019) Chemical products Transportation Machines Mineral products Plastics and rubbers Metals Foodstuffs Precious metals Textiles Instruments Animal products Vegetable products Paper goods Footwear and headwear Miscellaneous Stone and glass Wood products Animal and vegetable bi-products Animal hides Arts and antiques Weapons

Bermuda has little in the way of exports or manufacturing, and almost all manufactured goods and foodstuffs must be imported. The value of imports continues to rise, up from US$551m in 1994 to US$712m in 1999. The U.S. is Bermuda's primary trading partner; from a value of US$400m in 1994, U.S. imports expanded to US$533m in 2000. The United Kingdom, Canada, Seychelles and the Caribbean countries (mainly the Netherlands Antilles) also are important trading partners. Exports from Bermuda, including imports into the small free port, which are subsequently re-exported, increased from US$35m in 1993 to almost US$51m in 1999.

Duty on imports is a major source of revenue for the Government of Bermuda. In fiscal year 1998–99, the government obtained slightly more than $166 million, or about 30% of its revenue base from imports. Heavy importation duties are reflected in retail prices. Although Bermuda imposes no income, sales, or profit taxes, it does levy a real estate tax and a payroll tax.

== See also ==
- Bermuda Stock Exchange
- Nuclear Electric Insurance Limited
- Oil Insurance Limited
- Arch Capital Group
- Bermuda Triangle
