= Dundry Main Road South Quarry =

Geological Site of Special Scientific Interest in Somerset, England

- Site of Special Scientific Interest
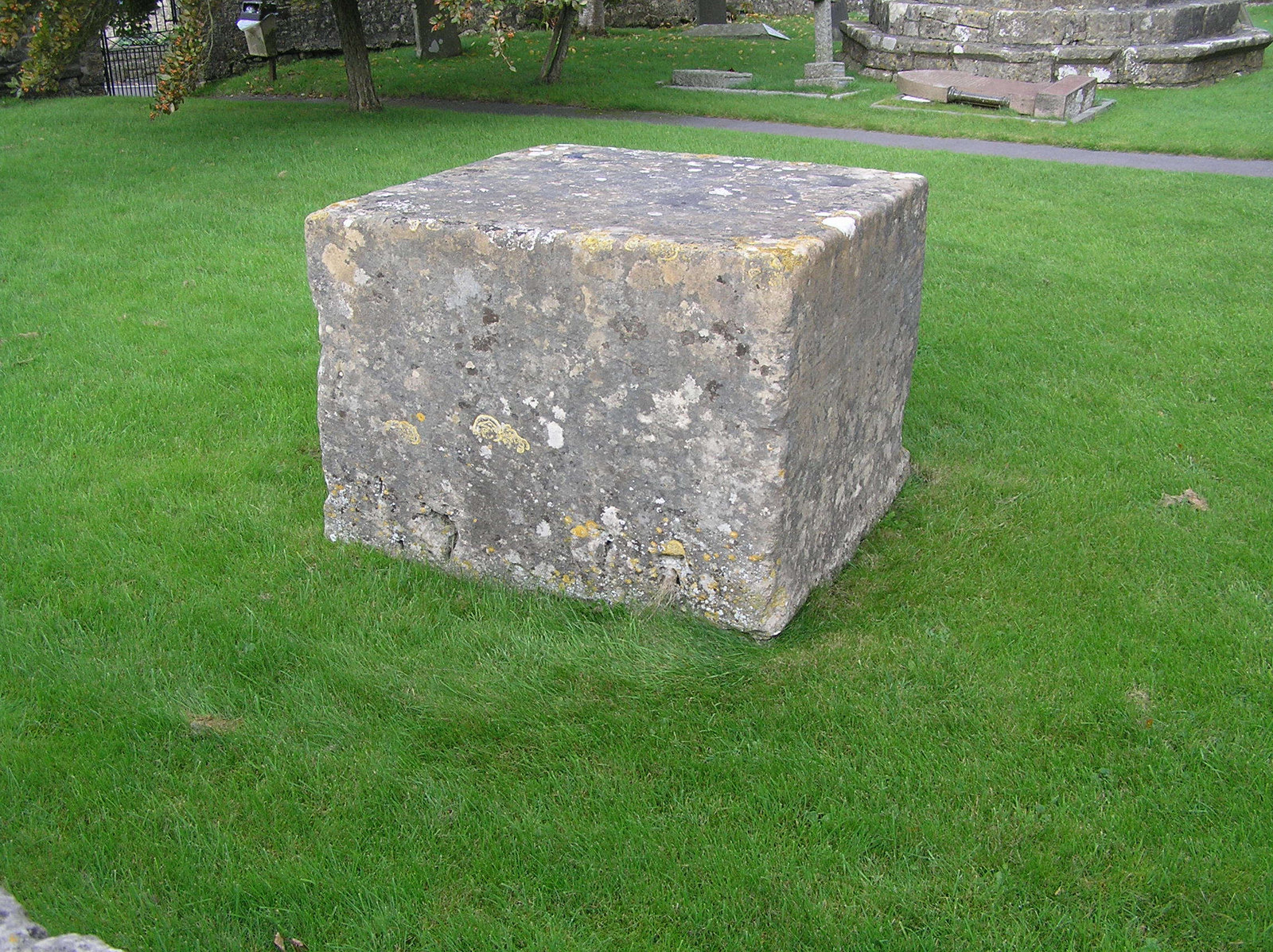
- A slab of Dundry stone in the churchyard of the Church of St Michael, Dundry

- Location within Somerset
- Location of Dundry Main Road South Quarry.
- Area of search: Avon
- Grid reference: ST566654
- Coordinates: 51.38598°N 2.62506°W
- Interest: Geological
- Area: 1.8 acres (0.0073 km^{2}; 0.0028 sq mi)
- Notification date: 1974

Dundry Main Road South Quarry (grid reference ST566654) is a 0.7 hectare geological Site of Special Scientific Interest near the village of East Dundry, North Somerset, notified in 1974.

The quarry was cited in the 19th century by d'Orbigny as the English "type section" for the Inferior Oolite. Dundry has long been a famous palaeontological and stratigraphic locality. The type locality for many species of molluscs and brachiopods, as well as other lesser groups, it is renowned as one of the world's most fossiliferous exposures with well over two hundred species recorded. The Main Road Quarry exposes a fine section in the Middle and Upper Inferior Oolite, with the rocks lying stratigraphically below them visible at Barns Batch Spinney. The former characterised by a typically southern English-Normandy fauna, including the rich ammonite occurrences of the "Brown iron-shot", and the latter by contrasting faunas of Cotswold aspect. This contrast is direct evidence for movements of the Mendip Axis in Middle Jurassic times, making this an outstanding site for its bearing on studies of palaeogeography.
