= East Dundry =

Hamlet in Somerset, England

Coordinates: 51.393°N 2.612°W

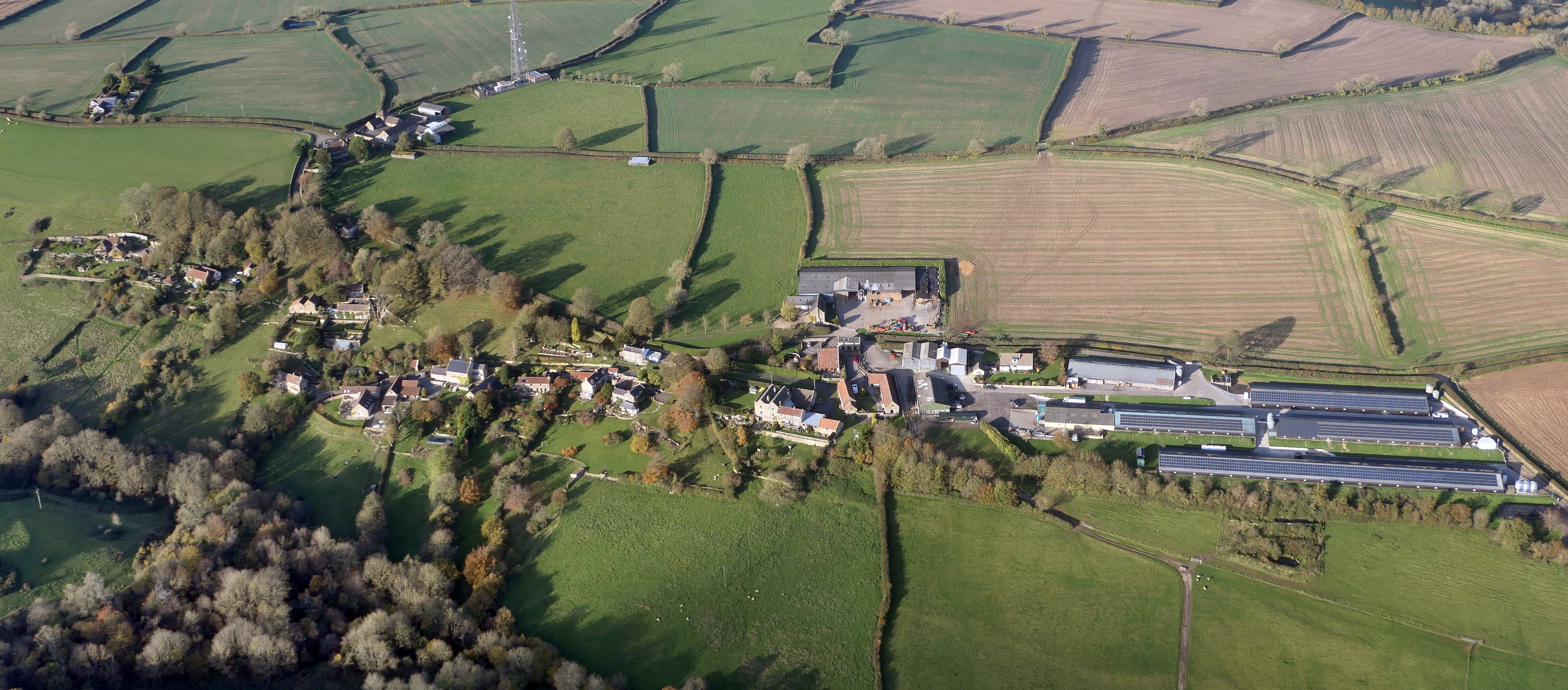
- East Dundry in about 2010

- Location within Somerset
- OS grid reference: ST575662
- Unitary authority: North Somerset
- Ceremonial county: Somerset
- Region: South West
- Country: England
- Sovereign state: United Kingdom
- Post town: BRISTOL
- Postcode district: BS41
- Dialling code: 0117
- Police: Avon and Somerset
- Fire: Avon
- Ambulance: South Western
- UK Parliament: North Somerset

East Dundry fire-watching instructions and rota for three months in 1942 (World War II)

An East Dundry taped window for enemy-bomb protection, December 1940

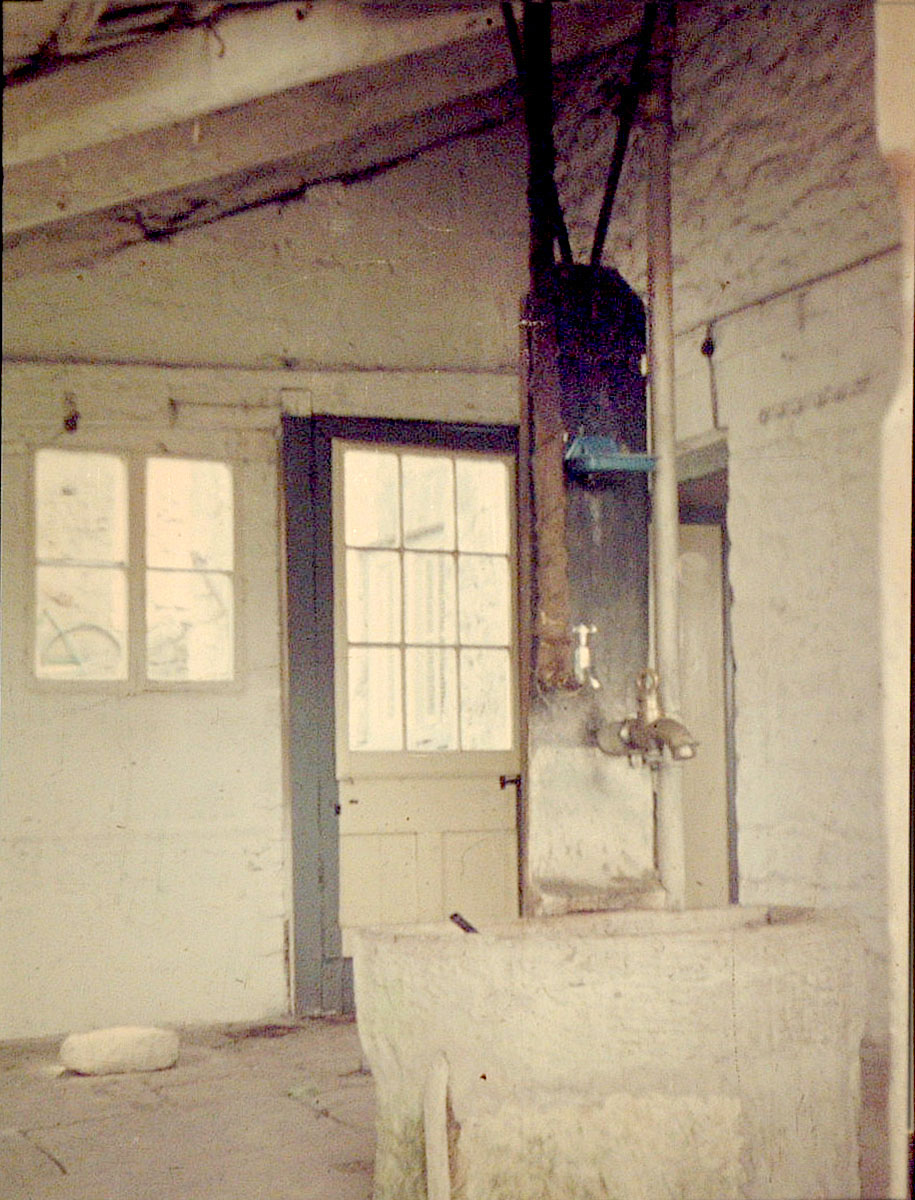
A pump and sink fed from a well in the kitchen of an East Dundry property, 1959

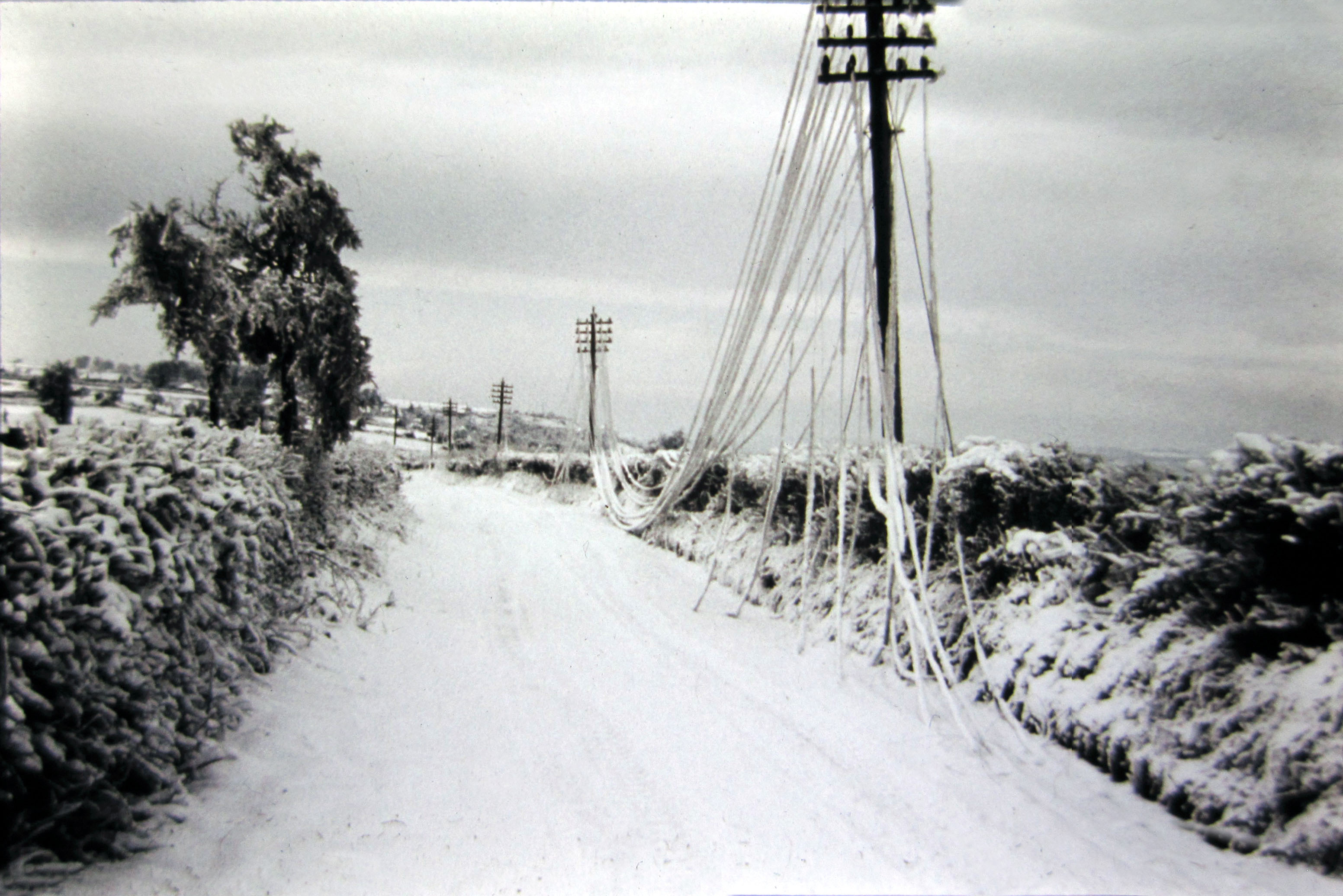
The end of overhead open-wire phone lines to East Dundry: East Dundry Lane, looking west, winter 1963

1842 tithe map with names for fields and two farms. Note the tithe officer's signature and "stamp" near the top. Spring Farm and Walnut Farm are identified. FARM is marked: this is the farm that moved to higher flat land as North Hill Farm after this 1842 map was drawn.

1955 tithe redemption notice for The Dingle, East Dundry. Note the £3/3/5 (£3, 3shillings, and 5pence) "redemption charge" never to again pay the annual 2/11d (2pence + 2pence + 5pence + 2shillings and 2pence = 2shillings and 11pence).

Registered letter cover

Tithe map for the property

East Dundry is a south-facing hamlet some 160 metres (520 ft) above sea level in a sheltered valley of Dundry Hill just south of Bristol, England. The hamlet is in the parish of Dundry and about two kilometres east of its village church. The Iron Age Maes Knoll tump (1.6 miles (2.5 km) to the east) and tumuli (in the field just north-east of North Hill Farm) are evidence of long occupation of the valley.

== Wansdyke, strip lynchets ==
East Dundry's northern slope facing Bristol has supposedly a continuation westwards from Maes Knoll of the remains of Wansdyke, a series some 19-mile-long (31 km) of early medieval defensive linear earthworks consisting of a ditch and a running embankment from the ditch spoil, with the ditching facing north, to repel invasion from the north.

There are ancient downhill strip lynchets in the large field opposite North Hill Cottage, and mildly sloping ones in the top field opposite The Rookery.

The original settlements probably owed their existence to the quarrying of the local Dundry stone, which is found at Cardiff Castle and was used in medieval Bristol. Nearby Dundry originally had a Roman fort built as part of the local defences against Anglo-Saxon invasions.

The hamlet today has some 16 houses, including one active farm (mostly successful breeding turkeys): there were five active farms until the 1950s, two until the 1920s, all mostly supplying milk to Bristol. Most buildings are built from locally quarried oolitic limestone, probably mainly from the sites of the houses. Two large outcrops of Dundry stone are visible at Spring Farm. Until 1930, the inhabitants were almost entirely farmers and farm workers; since then, the hamlet has gradually become a dormitory village for Bristol.

== Access, bus service, postal service ==
East Dundry Lane in the 1920s was the first to be tarred into the hamlet. Bristol, with its centre only 4 miles (6 km) away, had mains water, electricity, gas, and dial telephones by the 1930s – but the Second World War and its ten years of ensuing austerity stopped all extension of these facilities to places such as East Dundry.

From 1923 until the 1950s, there was a frequent Dundry Pioneer bus service from its Dundry terminus on the flat part of the Bristol-Wells road near the chapel at the top of Broad Oak Hill, into the then open-air bus terminus in Prince Street in Bristol via Dundry village, the Hairpin Bend, Bishopsworth, and Bedminster.

Until the 1960s, letters were delivered on bicycles to East Dundry and all Dundry premises. The Dundry Post Office was a few houses south of the Carpenter's Arms pub and its north-side neighbour the smithy, all strategically in Cold Harbour on the Bristol-Wells stage-coach mail road. Later, the post office was some 220 yards (200 m) north-west of Dundry church, in a house on the north side of the road.

== Second World War ==
A week or so before war was declared, several London children were evacuated to East Dundry; for instance, two were billeted at Spring Farm, two at The Dingle, and some at The Rookery.

Later in the war, refugees from the bombing of Bristol stayed, for instance, in Spring Farm. Two land girls helped in Walnut Farm and two in Spring Farm.

Bombs and shrapnel fell in East Dundry: bombs fell in the bull pen of North Hill Farm on 3 January 1941. Incendiary bombs fell in the hamlet, for instance in the farmyard of Spring Farm. Two East Dundry men were responsible in a rota every night as fire watchers for the hamlet.

== Electricity ==
Negotiations with the Electricity Board started with a meeting in Walnut Farm in 1952, with the installation in 1953 of an 11kV supply from across the valley.

== Water supply ==
=== Wells ===
The houses and farms built before about 1890 (and dating back to mediaeval and earlier times) are all geologically close to the division between clay and the higher layer of Dundry hill's oolitic limestone – this allowed wells to be sunk for them, with a reliable supply. Nearly all old East Dundry have wells.

=== Hydraulic rams ===
The farmhouses North Hill Farm and Walnut Farm were built in the late 19th century on the hamlet's higher and flatter land – more suitable than the steeper land of the original farms, such as Spring Farm and the farm that was at the current North Hill Cottage with its large flattish walled-garden that was its farm yard. These two higher farms installed separate hydraulic rams in the late 1800s and were served by them until the late 1950s. The farms needed ample water for their dairy herds to prosperously supply milk to Bristol by horse and cart.

North Hill Farm laid a 6-inch (15 cm) diameter, china-clay pipe (still visible in places in the steep nearby stream) from the spring below Upton Farm to a ram in a small stone hut on the south side of the valley-bottom stream. There remains a narrower metal pipe (crossing the stream and then all under the soil) up and through Nuthill field to North Hill Farm – much higher than the Upton Farm spring. The ram near the stream below Walnut Farm pumped water up to the farm. Upton farm also had (has?) a hidden, disused hydraulic ram near the same spring.

Day and night, the rams thumped every 20 seconds or so and were audible throughout East Dundry until the 1950s. Walnut Farm ran their ram well into the mid sixties, with the ram feed water supply coming from an open-topped limestone cistern built into the south side of the valley containing approximately 12 cubic metres (420 cu ft) of water bubbling up from an underground spring. The ram was housed in a small shed 45 yards (40 m) into the base of the valley next to the stream, with the waste wash from the ram flowing into it. The delivery pipe from the ram ran north up to a holding tank at the farm. Once a mains water supply was installed (1957/8), the water from the ram was used solely for livestock and washing down the yards. The rhythmic thumping of the ram had a shorter frequency than the one mentioned at North Hill Farm, with gentle knocks about every 3 to 4 seconds.

=== Mains water ===
Water (pumped up Dundry hill from the small pumping station halfway up Broad Oak Hill road) was only supplied to the hamlet in 1957/8 after negotiations since 1952. Dundry village had mains water supplied years earlier than East Dundry.

== Gas supply ==
Gas was first supplied in the 1960s when a gas main to Chew Magna was routed through East Dundry passing up from Bristol along the track north of North Hill Farm, down the hamlet's lane to Cross Cottage, down in the field at the west end of Cross Cottage's garden, along the road past Spring Farm and up the track towards Rattledown Farm. In a few years, every joint of this relatively high-pressure-gas steel pipeline had to be resealed when the supply was converted from town to natural gas. Later, the pipeline was reduced in pressure to minimise gas losses and only served East Dundry.

== Telephones and data fibre ==
East Dundry telephone subscribers were originally served by a network of poles and overhead open-wire cables, extending some 4 miles (6 km) from the Chew Magna manual telephone exchange. Due to the Second World War and the following austerity, two houses often shared one of the few available lines with party lines (for example, The Dingle had the number Chew Magna 81 from 1931, and the neighbouring North Hill Cottage later shared the line with Chew Magna 1081). In the late 1950s, Bristol's automatic Strowger Bedminster exchange 66xxxx numbers served the hamlet, changing later to 63xxxx and, yet later, to 963xxxx. Subscriber Trunk Dialling became available on 5 December 1958 to call a few UK cities. Bristol had the dialling code 0BR2, which progressively changed to 0272 (the same on the dial as 0BR2), then to 0117 plus 7-digit Bristol numbers.

During the lead-up to Christmas 1962, there were light snowfalls. Around Christmas Eve, after a slight thaw, freezing returned, with significant snowfalls on Boxing Day, later known as ‘The Big Freeze of 1963’. The previously partially melted light and fluffy snow formed dense solid ice on the thin copper telephone lines, increasing their weight. This and fresh snowfalls stretched the copper wires until they reached the ground. After the winter, the multiple overhead open-wire phone lines were replaced by a single multi-core cable suspended from the poles. A few years later, the cable was buried in the fields north of East Dundry Lane, and the poles were removed.

A fibre link to East Dundry was made in the early 2020s, underground west-to-east in the fields on the north side of East Dundry Lane, and distributed overhead to most of East Dundry's properties.

== Tithes ==
The Tithe Acts of 1936 and 1951 established the compulsory redemption of English tithes by the state, where the annual amounts payable were less than £1, so abolishing the bureaucracy and costs of collecting small sums of money. This applied to East Dundry as elsewhere.

== Notable residents ==
The plant pathologist Lawrence Ogilvie lived in The Dingle (now Dingle House). The sculptor Doris Kathleen Flinn lived in The Rookery.
