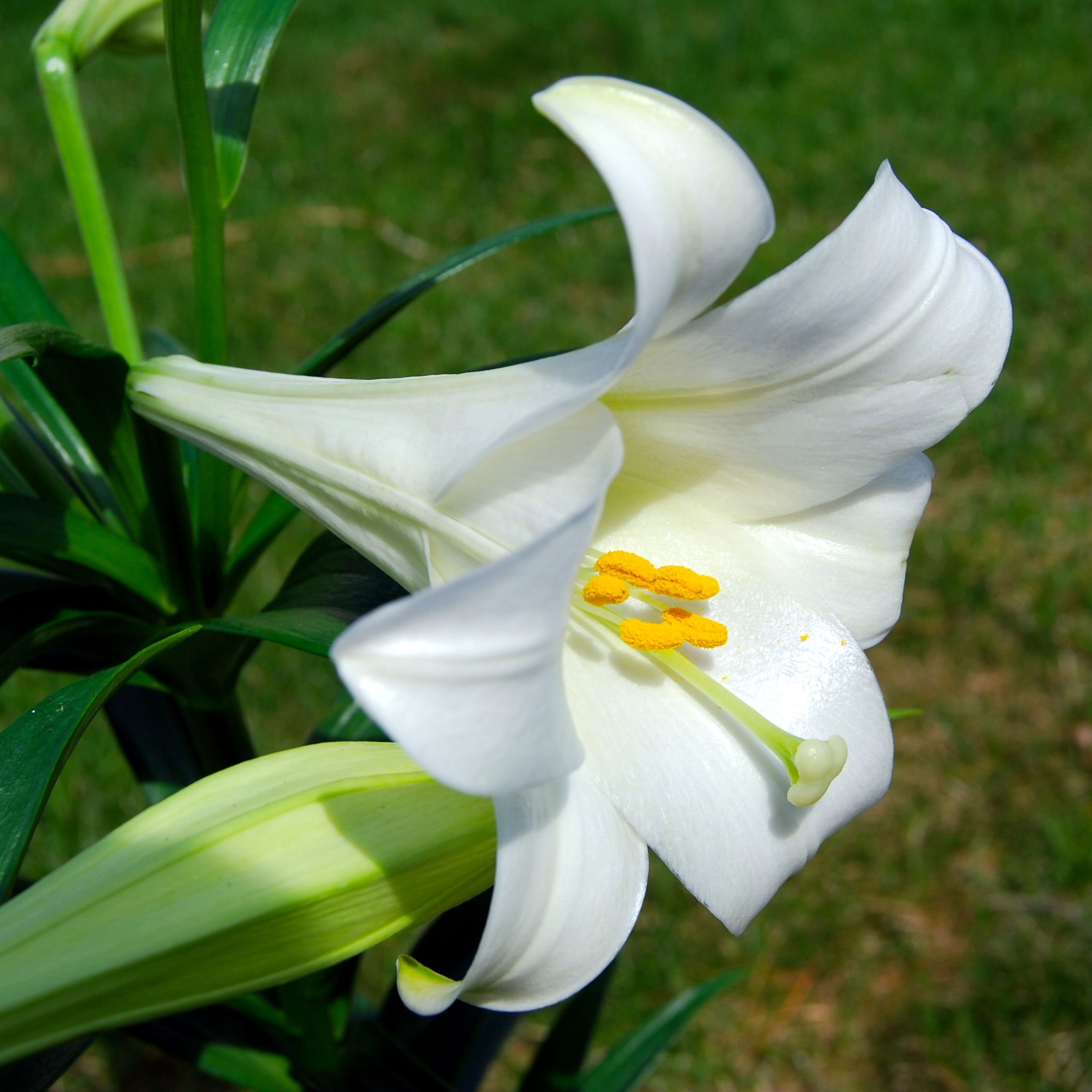

Scientific classification
- Kingdom: Plantae
- Clade: Tracheophytes
- Clade: Angiosperms
- Clade: Monocots
- Order: Liliales
- Family: Liliaceae
- Subfamily: Lilioideae
- Tribe: Lilieae
- Genus: Lilium
- Species: L. longiflorum

Binomial name
- Lilium longiflorum Thunb.

= Lilium longiflorum =

Species of lily

Lilium longiflorum, often called the Easter lily, is a species of plant endemic to both Taiwan and Ryukyu Islands (Japan). Lilium formosanum, a closely related species from Taiwan, has been treated as a variety of Easter lily in the past. It is a stem rooting lily, growing up to 1 m (3 ft 3 in) high. It bears a number of trumpet-shaped, white, fragrant, and outward-facing flowers. This species, along with most other true lilies, are highly toxic to cats.

== Features ==
Plants typically grow from about 50 cm (20 in) to 1 m (3 ft 3 in) tall. They have long oval leaves and the vein enters the horizontal direction. From April to June, the plant's flowering season, it produces pure white flowers on top of the stem. The stem has a cylindrical shape, with a diameter of about 5 cm (2.0 in).

== Cultivation ==
A variety of it, L. longiflorum var. eximium, native to the Ryukyu Islands, is taller and more vigorous. It is extensively cultivated for cut flowers. It has irregular blooming periods in nature, and this is exploited in cultivation, allowing it to be forced for flowering at particular periods, such as Easter. However, it can be induced to flower over a much wider period. This variety is sometimes called the Bermuda lily because it has been much cultivated in Bermuda.

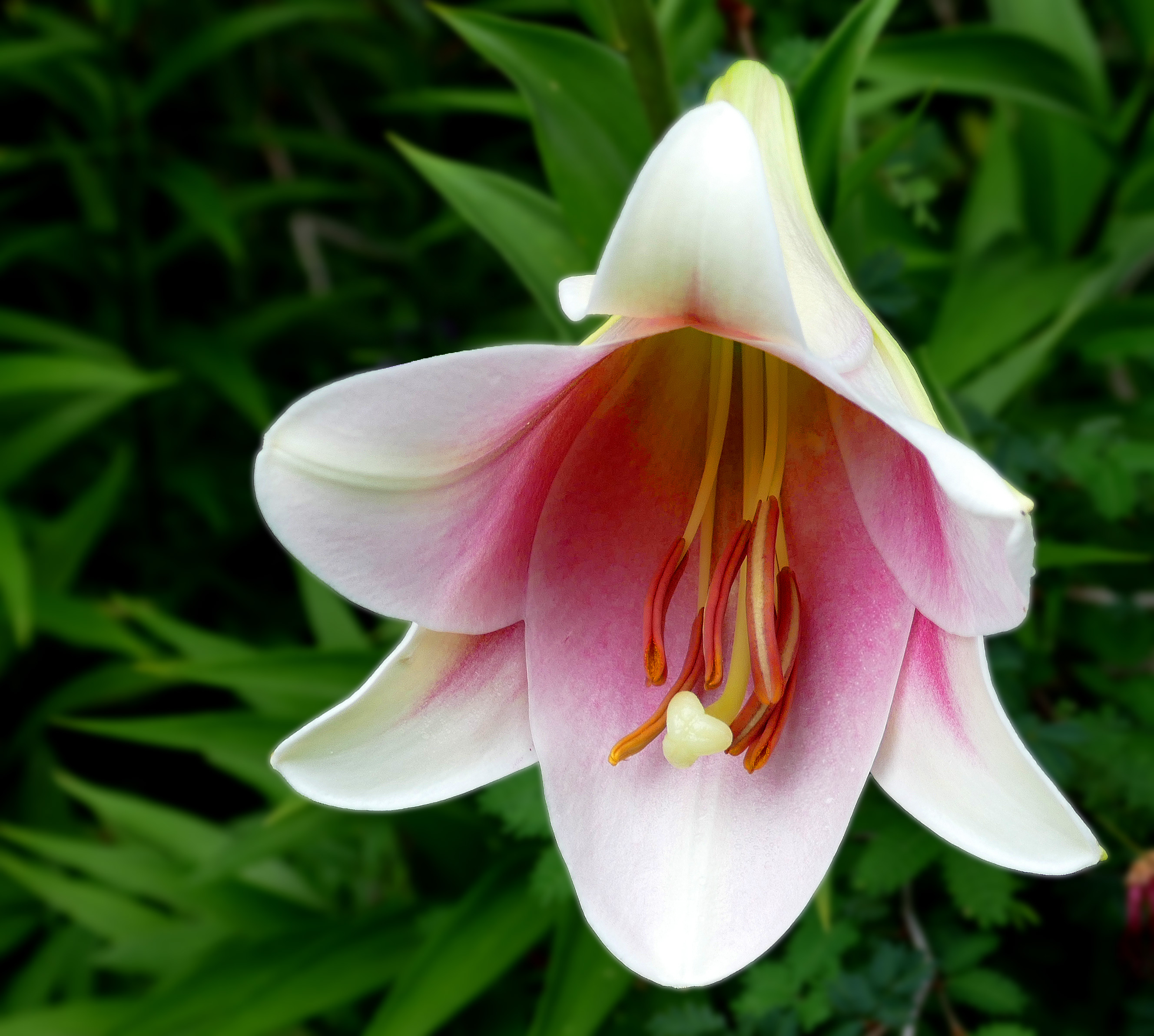
Lilium longiflorum 'Pink-Heaven'

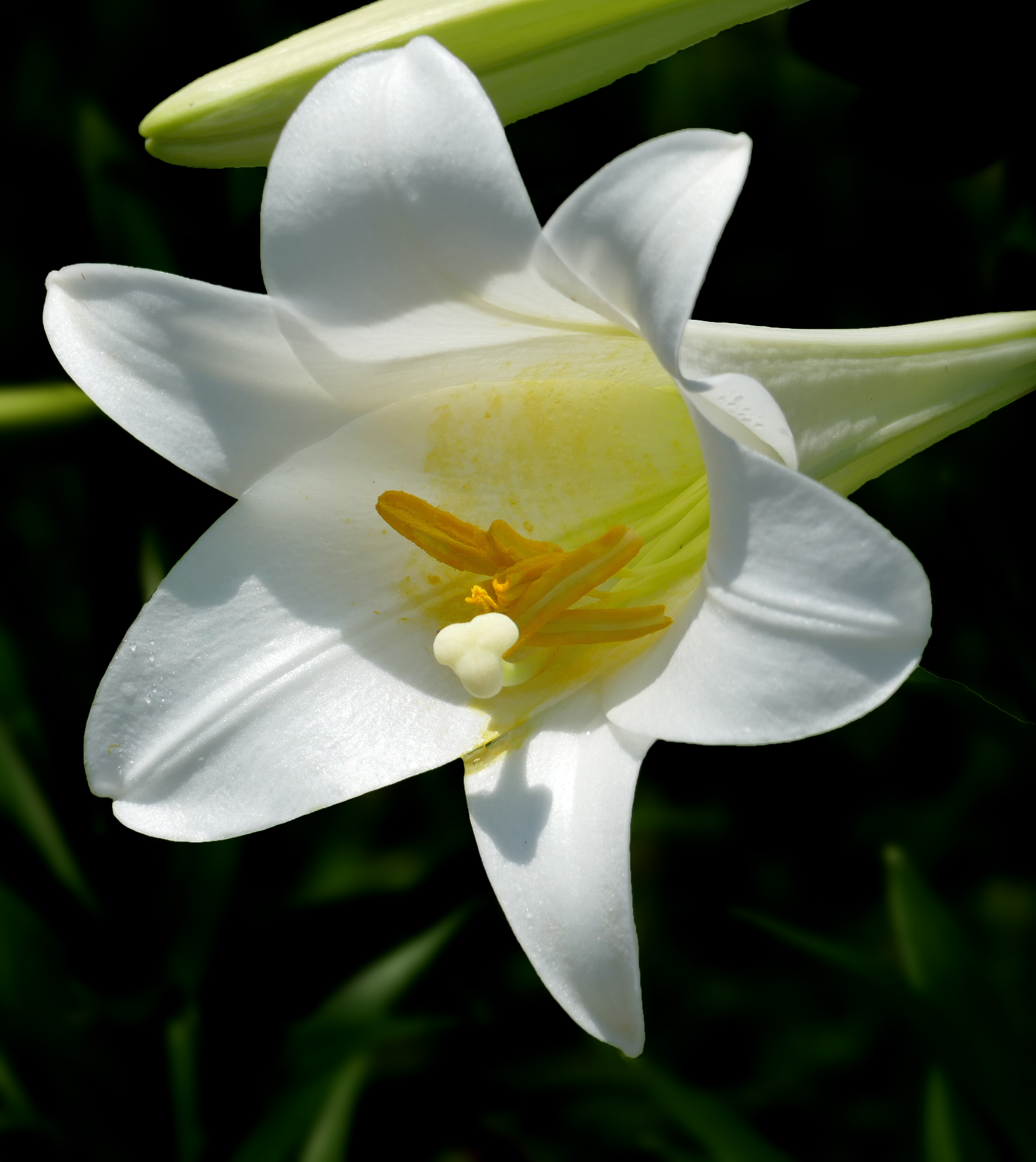

== Use in Christian symbolism ==
Lilium longiflorum is known as the Easter lily because in Christianity, it is a symbol of the resurrection of Christ, which is celebrated during Eastertide. The "lily has always been highly regarded in the Church", as Jesus referenced the flower. Furthermore, "after Jesus' death and resurrection, some of these beautiful flowers were found growing in the Garden of Gethsemane, where Jesus went to pray the night before His crucifixion. Legend has it that these flowers sprung up where drops of Jesus' sweat fell as he prayed". In many Christian churches, the chancel is adorned with Easter lilies throughout the Paschal season.

== History ==
In 1903, the USDA's Agricultural Research Services (ARS) started to distribute disease-free plant materials and seeds.

In Bermuda, from the 1890s to the early 1900s, there was from over some 200 fields a thriving export trade of lily bulbs by sea to New York. A disease then started affecting the lilies: a virus was identified by Lawrence Ogilvie, the Bermuda Government's first plant pathologist, serving from 1923 to 1928. In 1924 Lawrence Ogilvie saved the industry by identifying the problem to be not aphid damage as previously thought, and instituting controls in the fields and packing houses. There was a marked improvement in exporting 23 cases of lily bulbs in 1918 to 6043 cases in 1927 from the then 204 lily fields. With the disease eliminated by him, he saved the economy of Bermuda (lilies and early vegetables sent by ship to New York were then economically much more important for Bermuda than hotels and financial services are now).

In 1929, USDA's Agricultural Research Services started a breeding program, and released one of the first dwarf cultivars for potted-plant production. Prior to USDA's effort, lily bulbs were mostly imported from Japan until the 1940s. The supply of bulbs was suddenly cut off after the attack on Pearl Harbor and Easter lilies became extremely valuable in the United States.

Currently, nearly all Easter lily bulbs used in North America are grown on coastal bottom lands in northwestern California and southwestern Oregon, particularly in the town of Smith River, California.

== Chemistry ==
The Easter lily is a rich source of steroidal glycosides. It also contains bitter principles such as 3,6′-diferuloylsucrose.

== Toxicity ==
L. longiflorum is toxic to cats. The true mechanism of toxicity is undetermined, but it involves damage to the renal tubular epithelium (composing the substance of the kidney and secreting, collecting, and conducting urine), which can cause acute kidney injury. Veterinary help should be sought, as a matter of urgency, for any cat that is suspected of eating any part of the lily – including licking pollen that may have brushed onto its coat.

== See also ==
- List of plants known as lily
- Easter lily (badge), on the calla lily's use as a symbol of remembrance for Irish republican combatants
