= Barns Batch Spinney =

Protected area in Somerset, England

- Site of Special Scientific Interest
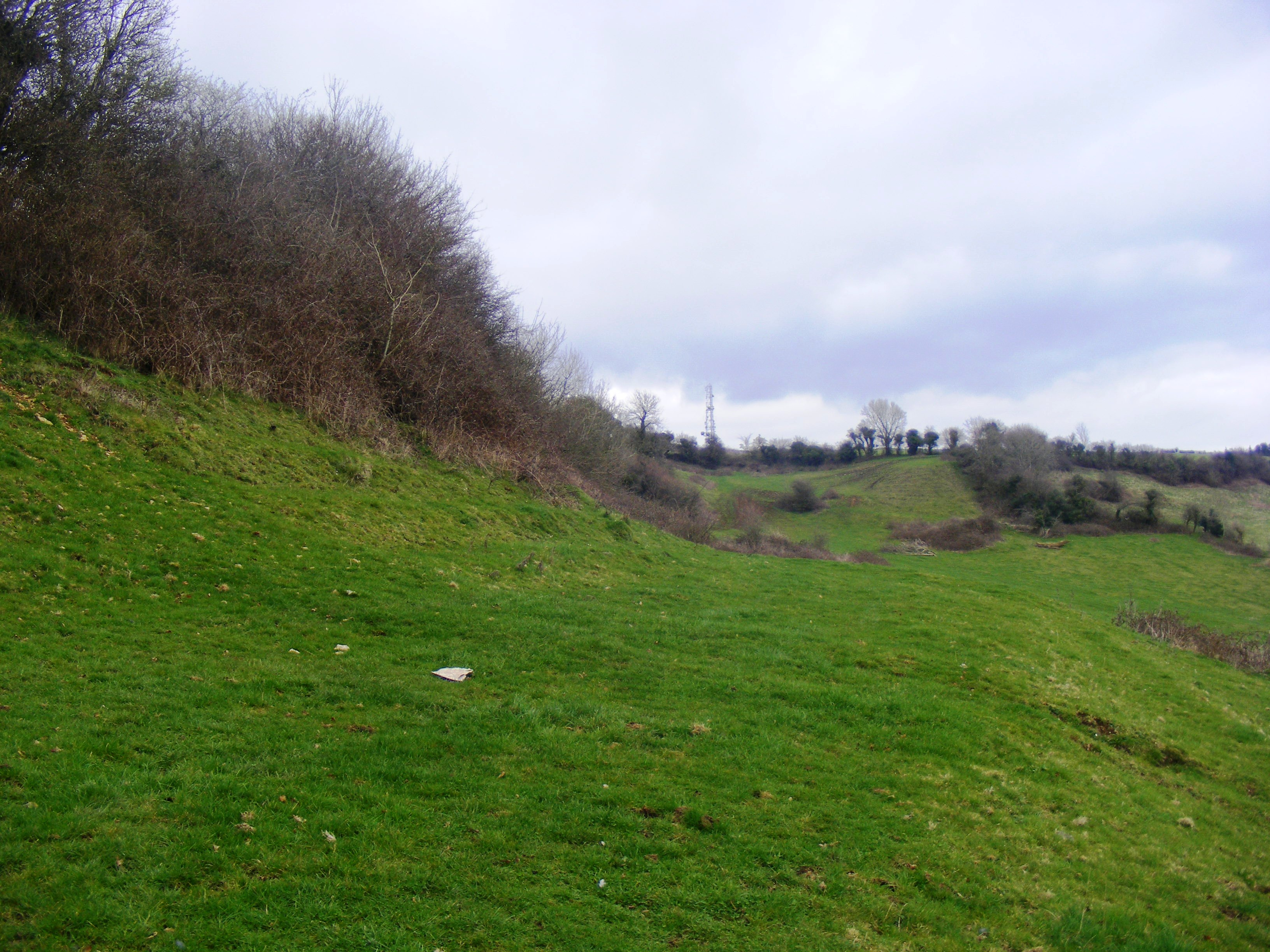

- Location within Somerset
- Location of Barns Batch Spinney.
- Area of search: Avon
- Grid reference: ST557659
- Coordinates: 51.39040°N 2.63806°W
- Interest: Geological
- Area: 0.06 ha (0.15 acres)
- Notification date: 1987

Barns Batch Spinney (grid reference ST557659) is a 0.06-hectare geological Site of Special Scientific Interest near the village of Dundry, North Somerset, notified in 1987.

The English Nature citation says that Barns Batch Spinney is important because of the exposures which it provides of the lower part of the classic Inferior Oolite limestone sequence of the Dundry area. It shows rocks lying stratigraphically below the Middle and Upper Inferior Oolite Limestones seen at Dundry Main Road South Quarry.

The geology at this site provides a section spanning the division of the Middle Jurassic known as the Aalenian and Bajocian Stages and a sequence of rocks placed in the subdivision known as the discites zone, named after the characteristic fossil ammonite Hyperlioceras discites. This is one of the thickest sequences in Britain and may be used as the basis for defining these new subzones.
