= Lawrence Ogilvie =

Scottish plant pathologist (1898–1980)

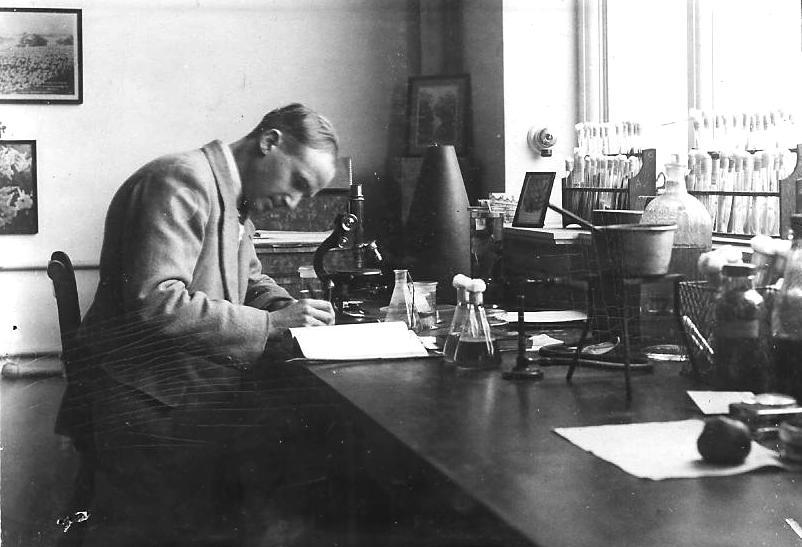
- Ogilvie in his Bermuda Department of Agriculture laboratory in the mid-1920s
- Born: 5 July 1898; The Manse, Rosehearty, Aberdeenshire, Scotland
- Died: 16 April 1980 (aged 81); Winford Hospital, Bristol
- Education: University of Aberdeen (BSc, MA) University of Cambridge (MSc)
- Known for: Plant pathology of crops in Bermuda 1923–1928 and Britain 1928–1965, entomology in Bermuda
- Spouse: Doris Katherine Raikes Turnbull

Lawrence Ogilvie (5 July 1898 – 16 April 1980) was a Scottish plant pathologist who pioneered the study of wheat, fruit and vegetable diseases in the 20th century.

From 1923, in his first job and aged only 25, when agriculture was Bermuda's major industry, Ogilvie identified the virus that had devastated the islands' high-value lily bulb crops in 204 bulb fields for 30 years. By introducing agricultural controls, he re-established the valuable export shipments to the US, increasing them to seven-fold the volume of earlier "virus years". He was established as a successful young scientist when he had a 3-inch column describing his work published by one of the world's premier scientific journals, Nature.

Bermuda's exporting its three vegetable crops a year to the USA gave plant pathologist Ogilvie much experience of vegetable diseases, such that on return to Britain, five years later, he became the UK expert on the diseases of commercially grown vegetables and wheat from the 1930s to the 1960s. This knowledge was vital for Britain in World War II with severe food shortages and rationing.

In total he wrote over 130 articles about plant diseases in journals of learned societies.

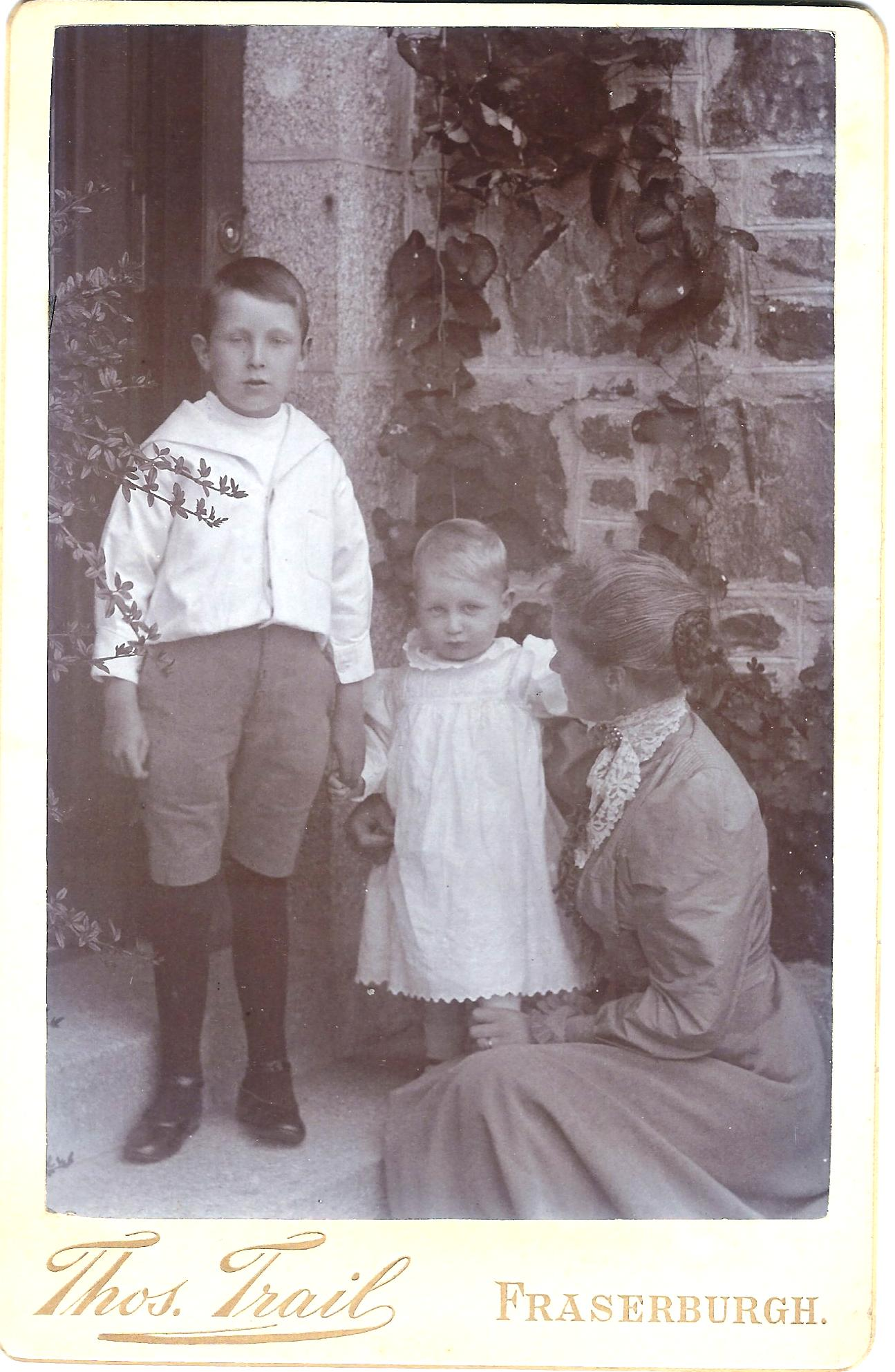
Lawrence and his older brother Alan with their mother Elizabeth Ogilvie (née Lawrence) at the front door of their family home The Manse, Rosehearty, just west of Fraserburgh, Aberdeenshire about 1900.

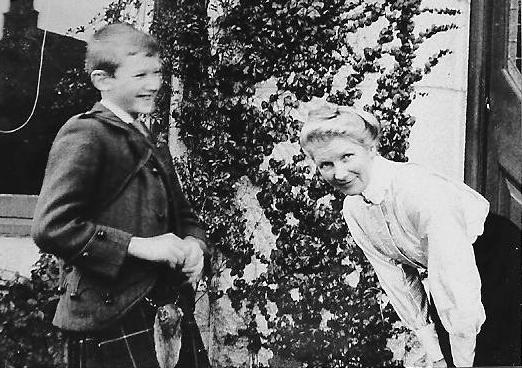
Lawrence in his Ogilvie tartan kilt with his mother outside their Aberdeen house in about 1911.

== Education ==
Lawrence was born in Rosehearty, a fishing village on the north coast of Aberdeenshire, Scotland, on 5 July 1898. His father, the Reverend William Paton Ogilvie, was the minister of the Presbyterian church there. He attended Aberdeen Grammar School and took his BSc and MA at the University of Aberdeen in 1921 as the Fullerton Research Scholar with special distinction in botany and zoology. He was also awarded the Collie Prize for the most distinguished student in botany. In Aberdeen, he lectured on the Alpine flora of China. At Emmanuel College, Cambridge, he studied plant pathology and was awarded an MSc in 1923 for his work on tree slime fluxes, particularly willow, elm, horse chestnut, and apple trees.

== Career ==
On graduating at Cambridge University he was offered to be the first scientifically trained plant pathologist and entomologist to work in either of the then British colonies of Bermuda or Mauritius. He chose Bermuda, taking trains in September 1923 from Scotland to the port of Avonmouth near Bristol to catch the SS Changunida banana boat to Bermuda.

He was to be continuously employed from September 1923 in Bermuda, and then from 1928 in Bristol in the west of England, until he retired at the age of 65.

At age 71, working from home, he researched necessary changes and published his sixth edition of the British government's official national Diseases of Vegetables Bulletin 123 110-page guide for commercial growers – his first edition of 84 pages was published in July 1941 when food was rationed and in short supply due to WWII. The bulletin was also translated into Spanish and published in 1964 as Enfermedades de las Hortalizas.

=== Bermuda ===
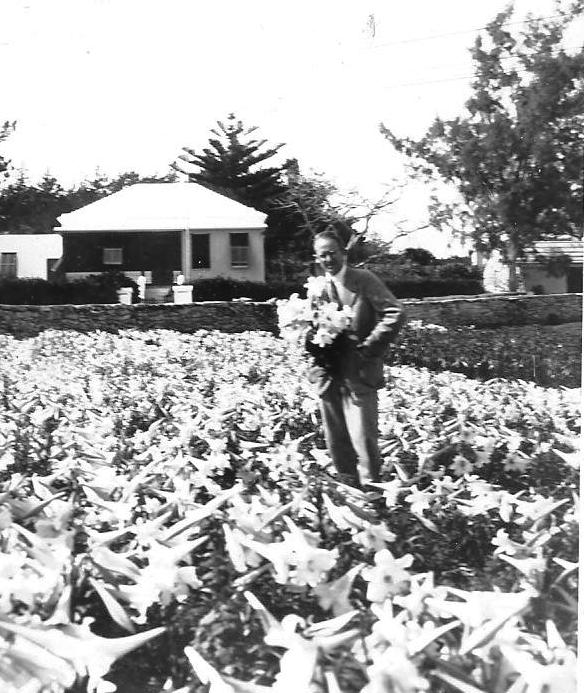
In one of Bermuda's 204 lily-bulb fields, 1926

From November 1923 (age 24) to April 1928 he was the Bermuda Government's first plant pathologist and entomologist—the first Bermuda Government agricultural scientist. He developed agricultural laws for Bermuda; initiated seed testing; registered local seedsmen; organised the improvement of seed potatoes; established plant quarantine; studied the diseases of celery and other vegetables, maize, vines, avocados, bananas and citrus fruits; and investigated the banana losses from the Mediterranean Fruit Fly.

As the Bermuda delegate at the Kingston, Jamaica 8th West Indian Agricultural Conference in March 1924, he initiated West Indian plant inspections, nursery-stock export certificates, and the inspection and grading of fruit and vegetables for export.

He was acclaimed in Bermuda for identifying the virus that had increasingly damaged the commercially vital lily-bulb export trade of Lilium longiflorum to the USA since the late 19th century. Aphid damage had previously been thought to be the cause of the crop failures. He identified the virus as transmitted by the aphid Aphis lilii Takahashi. Following establishing strong government inspection in the fields and packing stations, he reported the marked improvements found during his 1927 inspections of 204 bulb fields of these lilies.

Exports of Bermuda Easter lilies increased from 823 cases in 1918 to 6043 cases in 1927. Due to this success being published in the renowned Nature magazine, and while still in his 20s, Ogilvie was made a vice-president of the British Lily Society.

Ogilvie wrote The Insects of Bermuda, published in 1928 by the Department of Agriculture, Bermuda. He identified and described 395 insects; in particular the Aphid ogilviei discovered by him on Lilium Harrisli in Bermuda.

Bermuda had three crops of vegetables each year for export to New York: this gave him the experience to later pioneer the European study of vegetable diseases.

=== England ===
In the winter of 1928 he was appointed Advisory Mycologist at Long Ashton Research Station near Bristol, England. The Vale of Evesham, Cornwall, and other West Country areas grew and grow much of Britain's vegetables. He pioneered the European study of commercial fruit and particularly vegetable diseases with 44 scientific papers between 1929 and 1946 at Long Ashton Research Station. He wrote the government's official national Diseases of Vegetables practical guide for trade growers: the six editions from 1941 to 1969 (in 1969, retired and aged 71) were full of photos of wilting crops.

Ogilvie was influential in the World War II and post-war challenge of feeding Britain: he was the leading British expert on the diseases of cereal crops and vegetables. By the 1940s, wheat varieties had not been sufficiently bred to resist the rust and other diseases in the damp climate prevalent in Britain and particularly in the south west where he was responsible for advising farmers. Before the war, Britain imported half its food, but by 1941 relied on home-grown crops because German submarines were sinking about 60 merchant ships per month, and the priority for shipping was to carry matériel to resist the impending invasion. The 1940s varieties of wheat were still unable to resist disease, with long stalks prone to lodging in the heavy rains of the west of England.

Ogilvie was also consulted about willow diseases during World War II. Surprisingly, willows were a strategic material throughout the war. Everything dropped by parachute was dropped in a basket – light and strong, they bounced on impact and could be made to any shape. Home production of willows was about 2000 tonnes per year. There were 630 manufacturers employing 7000 basket makers.

He was the international authority on the diseases of wheat that flourished in these British damp, warm conditions – particularly Black Stem Rust and Take All.

Ogilvie and his team of scientists advised growers and farmers in the south-west of England through the war years and until his retirement age 65 in 1963. This was particularly important to Britain during the war and the continued food rationing period to 1954 – bread for instance was rationed from 1946 to 1948, even though it was not rationed during the war.

Ogilvie was elected a vice president of the British Mycological Society in December 1956.

== Personal life ==
=== Before 1940 ===
On 10 January 1931 in the Unitarian Meeting House, in Bessels Green, Sevenoaks, Kent, England, Lawrence married landscape architect Doris Katherine Raikes Turnbull, whom he had met within three months of starting work in Bermuda: a letter to his mother within six months included "I am all for her ... Miss T is a great one for gadding about".

After Bermuda and their wedding, they lived happily together through WWII and the rest of their lives in the hilly agricultural hamlet East Dundry, close to the southern side of Bristol.

Lawrence's wife Doris and son Duncan by their window taped for enemy-bomb protection, December 1940.

Doris was born on 14 November 1898, the same year as Lawrence – but in Nowgong (now Nagaon), Assam, India, the daughter of Alexander Duncan Turnbull, manager of a tea plantation; and granddaughter of the eminent 1850s Indian-railways-construction civil engineer George Turnbull.

Doris complemented Lawrence's botanical knowledge, having studied horticulture in Swanley, Kent in England; teaching gardening (and becoming fluent in French) 1921 to 1923 at La Corbière école horticole pour jeunes filles in Estavayer-le-Lac on the east shore of Lake Neuchatel in Switzerland; studying from 1924 at the Lowthorpe School of Landscape Architecture in Groton, Massachusetts (one of the first colleges to teach women landscape architecture); meeting her future husband while working for the public gardens in Bermuda; and from April 1925 establishing the three-acre garden of Ilaro Court which later became the official residence of the Prime Ministers of Barbados.

=== From 1940 ===
Their son and only child (William) Duncan Ogilvie was born 1 November 1940 in their East Dundry home. About midday on Sunday 24 November, he was the last to be christened in Bristol's St James' Presbyterian Church. That evening 148 long-range bombers of Germany's Luftflotte 3 bombed Bristol. The church was bombed, never to be used again. The church tower remains (about 100 metres south of the east end of Bristol bus station): the nave was destroyed, with its area now having an office block.

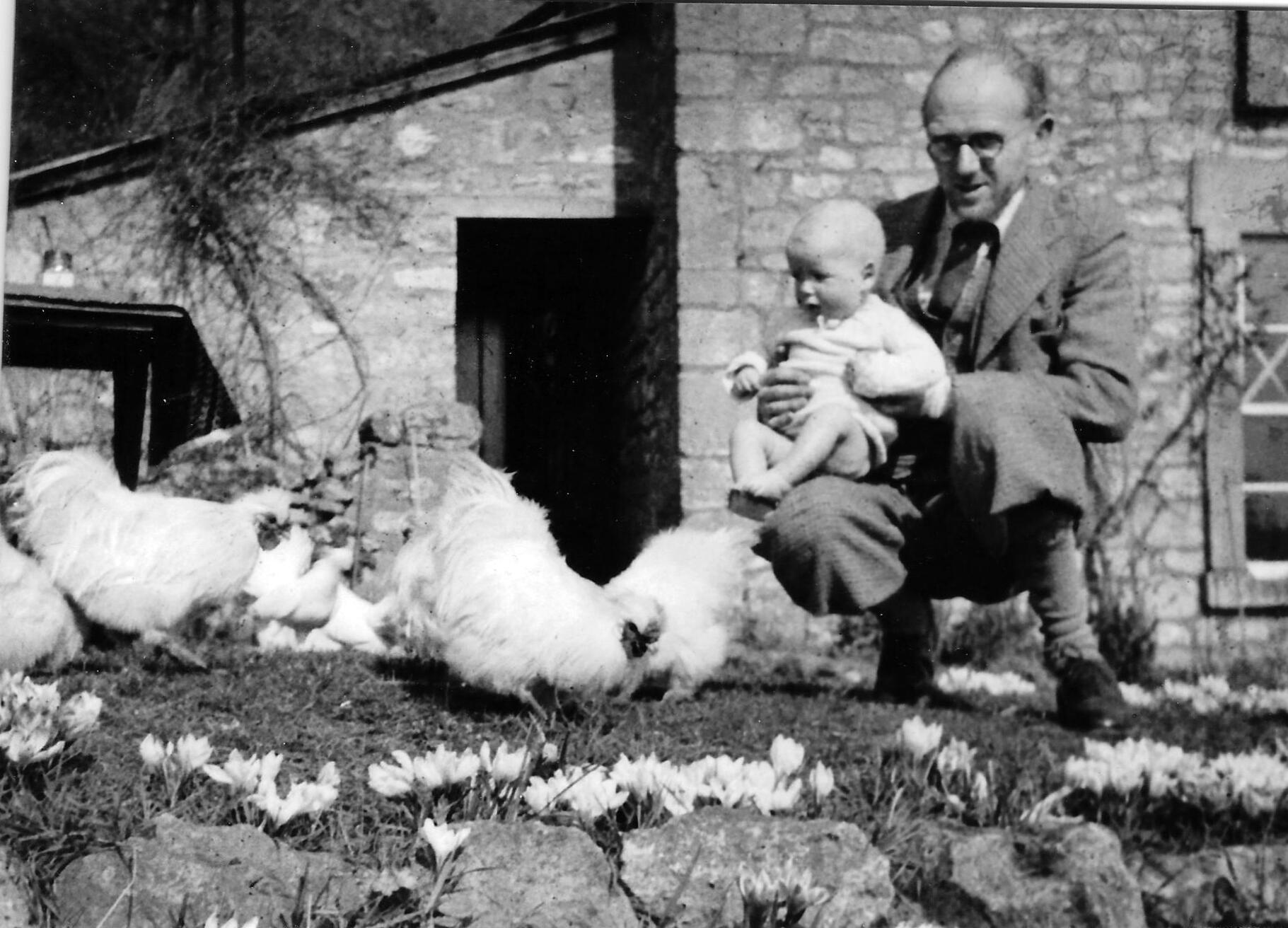
Lawrence Ogilvie with his son in 1941

Slightly stronger than her husband, Doris developed and maintained their garden in East Dundry. She often coped with their 40-foot-deep well (losing her left thumb in its diesel-engine pump, and nearly dying of then appropriately-called Lockjaw, while then having a small baby): after 28 years in their house, mains water arrived in 1957.

Through 77 Nazi bombings of and around Bristol, Doris coped briefly with two Bristol boy evacuees, with her baby, digging the large kitchen garden, an apple- and plum-tree orchard, a dozen or so hens (trying to keep foxes away), two goats, three bee hives, and cycling to the one small Dundry shop. Food and much else was rationed during the war, with some still rationed to 1954. Their manual pre-dial phone had the number Chew Magna 81. The hamlet had candles and Aladdin lamps until electricity and gas, also delayed by WWII, came in 1953 and the 1960s. The house had a black-and-white TV from 1959.

Lawrence was a member of the wartime Dundry Home Guard and the night East Dundry fire-watching team. His duties, with his education and typist-work-availability, included the publishing of their responsibilities and shifts.

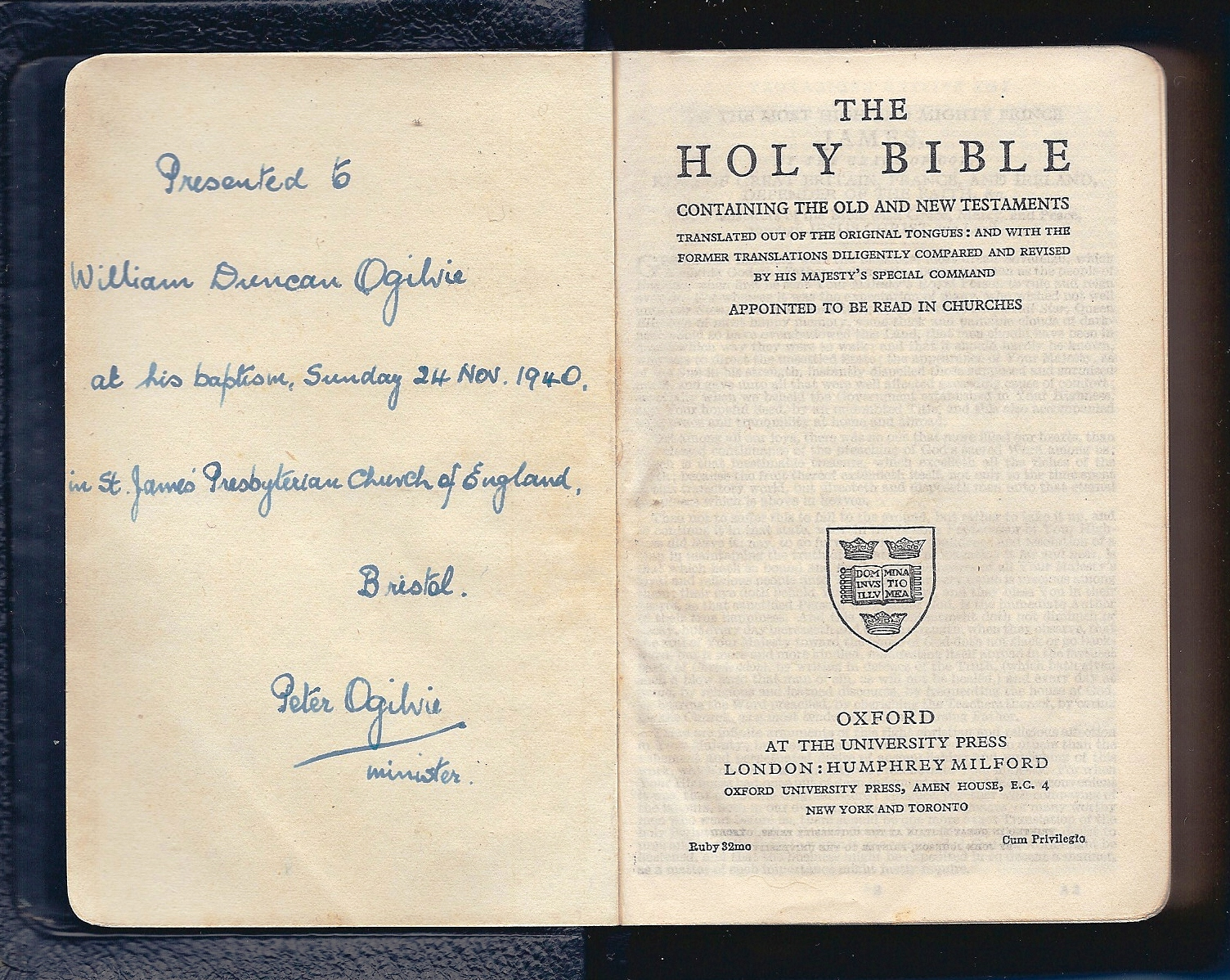
A few hours before the church was bombed, this is the christening bible for their son (William) Duncan. (Peter Ogilvie, the church Minister was not a relation.)

He was a founding member and a chairman of the Friends of the Bristol Art Gallery, giving the Jacob Epstein bronze Kathleen to the gallery. He was on the founding committee of Bristol's modernist Arnolfini Gallery. The two built a collection of 1930s to 1970s modern art and enjoyed watercolour painting on holidays, often driving and camping with their son in Scotland and across Europe after WWII.

Doris died of colon cancer in their East Dundry home in September 1965, with Lawrence and son in and out from working in the garden. In 1980, Lawrence broke his hip when he fell in their garden: the surgeons muddled his operation, sadly moving him after a second operation non-compos mentis to Winford hospital where he died months later on 16 April 1980.
