= Oil Insurance Limited =

Mutual insurance company

- Industry: Mutual insurance
- Founded: 1972
- Headquarters: Hamilton, Bermuda
- Total assets: $5.7 billion (2012)
- Website: www.oil.bm

Oil Insurance Limited (OIL) is a Bermuda–based mutual insurance company. It was founded in 1972 by 16 oil companies.

== Founding shareholders ==
The founding shareholders were:

- Amerada Hess Corporation
- Ashland Oil & Refining
- Atlantic Richfield Company
- Champlin Petroleum Company
- Cities Service Company
- Forest Oil Company
- Gulf Oil Corporation
- Marathon Oil Company
- Murphy Oil Corporation
- Petrofina S.A.
- Phillips Petroleum Company
- Signal Oil and Gas
- Standard Oil Company of California
- Tenneco Inc.
- The Standard Oil Company (Ohio)
- Union Oil Company of California

== See also ==
- Nuclear Electric Insurance Limited—mutual insurance company serving the nuclear power industry
