= Nuclear Electric Insurance Limited =

Nuclear Electric Insurance Limited (NEIL)
- Industry: Mutual insurance
- Founded: 1980
- Headquarters: Wilmington, Delaware, United States
- Website: www.myneil.com

Nuclear Electric Insurance Limited (NEIL) is a mutual insurance company which insures all nuclear power plants in the United States as well as some facilities internationally. The company is based in Wilmington, Delaware, and is registered in Bermuda.

It was founded in 1980 in response to the 1979 Three Mile Island accident. In 1997, NEIL merged with Nuclear Mutual Limited, of Bermuda.

The company provides a range of insurance products, including property damage coverage, third-party liability coverage, and environmental impairment liability coverage.

== See also ==
- Oil Insurance Limited—mutual insurance company serving the energy industry
