= Maes Knoll =

Iron Age hillfort in Somerset, England

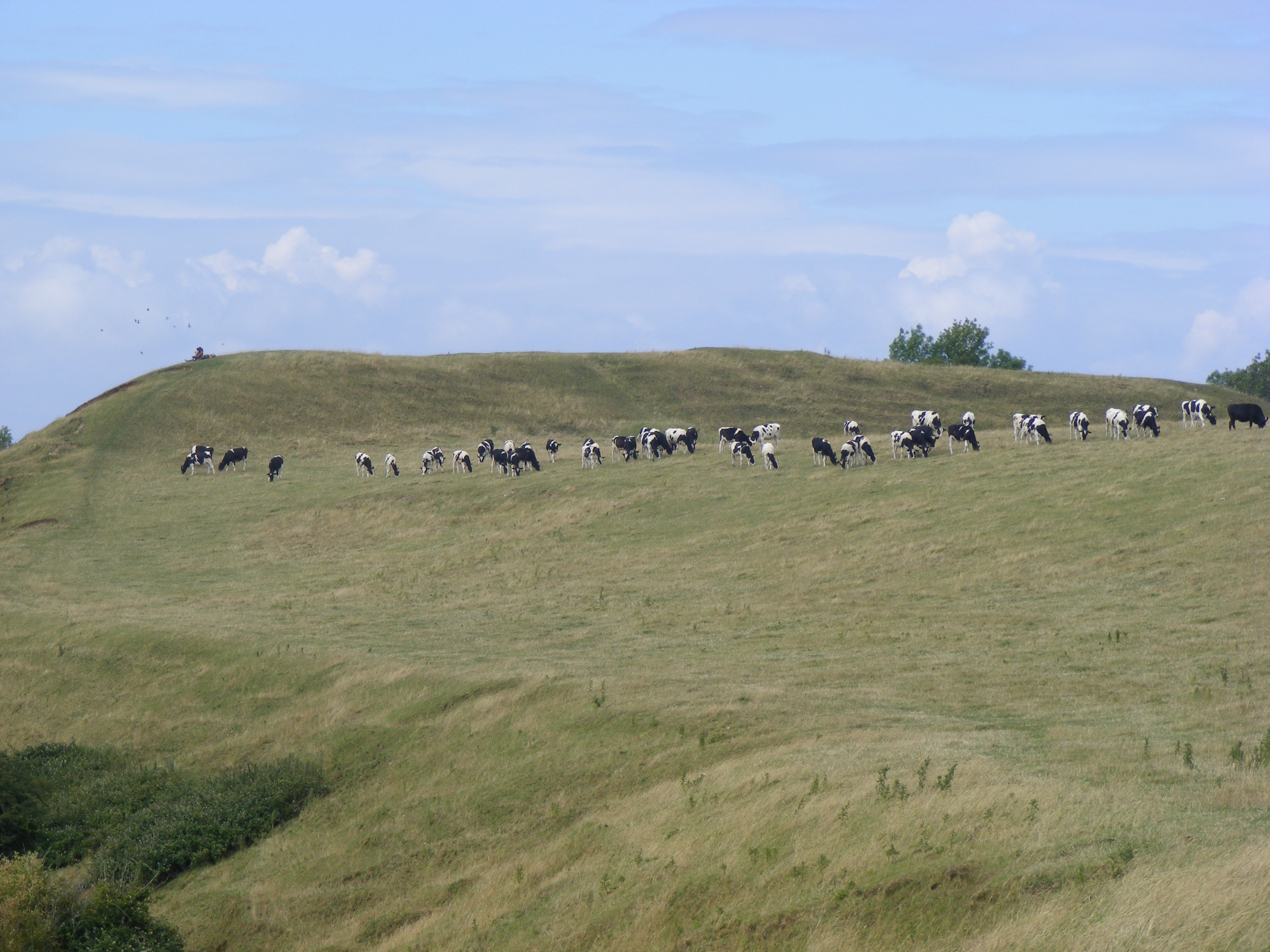
- Interactive map of Maes Knoll
- 51°23′31.46″N 2°34′32.02″W
- Type: Hill fort
- Periods: Iron Age
- Location: near Norton Malreward and Bristol
- Region: Somerset, England

Site notes
- Condition: some damage

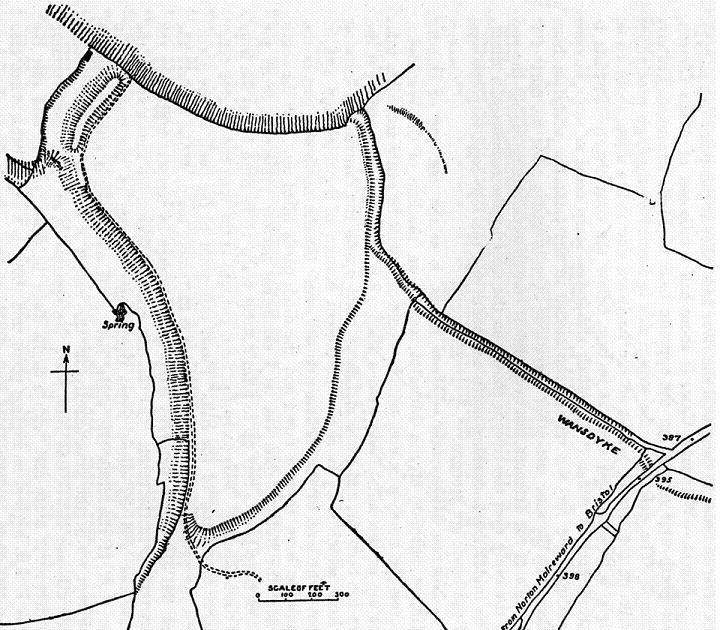
Plan of the site

Maes Knoll (sometimes Maes tump or Maes Knoll tump) is an Iron Age hill fort in Somerset, England, located at the eastern end of the Dundry Down ridge, south of the city of Bristol and north of the village of Norton Malreward near the eastern side of Dundry Hill. It is a Scheduled Ancient Monument.

== Background ==
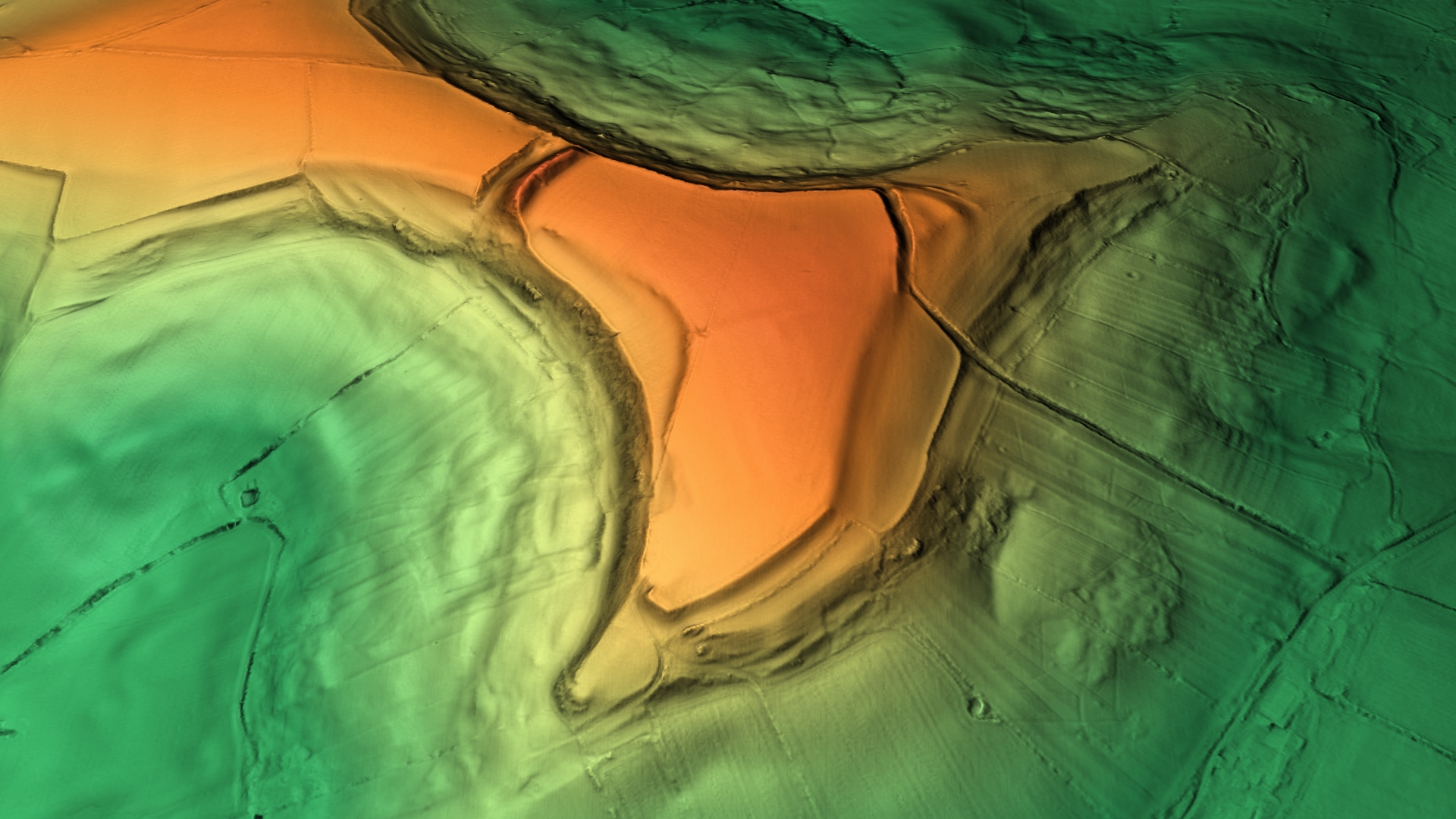
3D view of the digital terrain model

Hill forts developed in the Late Bronze and Early Iron Age, roughly the start of the first millennium BC. The reason for their emergence in Britain, and their purpose, has been a subject of debate. It has been argued that they could have been military sites constructed in response to invasion from continental Europe, sites built by invaders, or a military reaction to social tensions caused by an increasing population and consequent pressure on agriculture. The dominant view since the 1960s has been that the increasing use of iron led to social changes in Britain. Deposits of iron ore were distant from the tin and copper ore necessary to make bronze, so that trading patterns shifted and the old elites lost their economic and social status. Power passed into the hands of a new group of people. Archaeologist Barry Cunliffe believes that population increase still played a role and has stated "[the forts] provided defensive possibilities for the community at those times when the stress [of an increasing population] burst out into open warfare. But I wouldn't see them as having been built because there was a state of war. They would be functional as defensive strongholds when there were tensions and undoubtedly some of them were attacked and destroyed, but this was not the only, or even the most significant, factor in their construction".

== Description ==
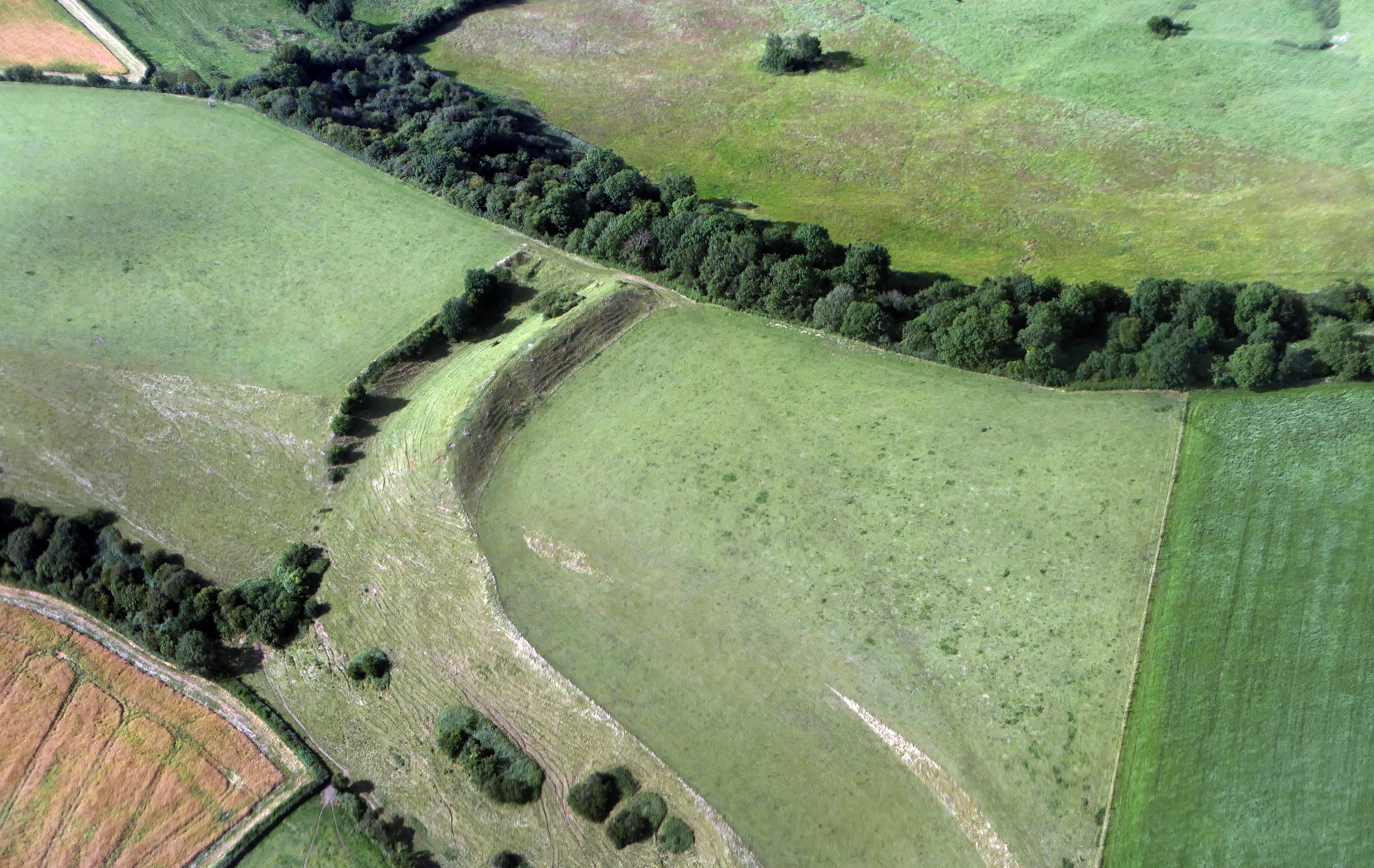
Aerial view of part of the monument.

The hill fort, which is approximately 390 by 84 feet (119 m × 26 m), and 45 feet (14 m) in height, covering 20 acres (8.1 ha), consists of a fairly large flat open area, roughly triangular in shape, that has been fortified by ramparts and shaping of the steep-sided hilltop around the northern, eastern and southwestern sides of the hill. It rises to an altitude of 197 metres (646 ft) above sea level, and provides views over the lands it would have once commanded. From here, there are clear views north to Bristol, east to Bath and the Cotswold Hills, and south over Stanton Drew stone circles to Chew Valley Lake and the Mendip Hills. The underlying rocks are Inferior Oolite of the Jurassic period.

== Early history ==
It is believed to have been built, around 250 BC, by the Dobuni who were one of the Celtic tribes living in the British Isles prior to the Roman invasion of Britain. The name Maes Knoll is derived from the Brythonic word *maɣes meaning flat top (compare Welsh maes), derived from Proto-Celtic *magos meaning plain, field, and Old English knoll or knowle meaning hill. The existing scarp slopes were steepened and, on the north-western edge of the fort is an earthen mound, known as Maes Knoll Tump, about 7.5 metres (25 ft) above the rests of the fort defences, which is 60 metres (200 ft) across and 15 metres (49 ft) above a defensive ditch.

The pre-historic, later Wansdyke runs west from it along the north side of Dundry Hill and south-east from it.

== Second World War ==
During the Second World War, a small, draughty, rectangular, corrugated-iron hut on the top of the tump sheltered two or more of Dundry's Home Guard, allowing them to spot enemy aircraft and potential parachute or glider invasions of Bristol. The modern outlines of the hut and a smaller, more-square area are both still discernible. Presumably, the tall trees to the north of the tump would have been cut down to allow clear visibility of Bristol.

The flat plateau immediately to the east of Maes Knoll had some 50 wartime stone cairns to deter enemy glider landings. The cairns continued to be there for some years after the war ended.

== See also ==
- List of hillforts and ancient settlements in Somerset
