= Wansdyke =

Earthworks in Somerset and Wiltshire, England

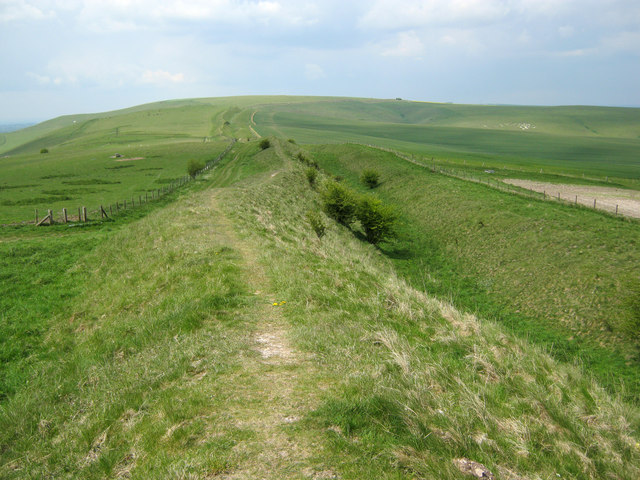
The Wansdyke on Tan Hill, Wiltshire

Wansdyke (from Woden's Dyke) is a series of early medieval defensive linear earthworks in the West Country of England, consisting of a ditch and a running embankment from the ditch spoil, with the ditching facing north. There are two main parts: an eastern dyke that runs between Savernake Forest, West Woods and Morgan's Hill in Wiltshire, and a western dyke that runs from Monkton Combe to the ancient hill fort of Maes Knoll in historic Somerset. Between these two dykes, there is a middle section formed by the remains of the London-to-Bath Roman road.

== Usage ==
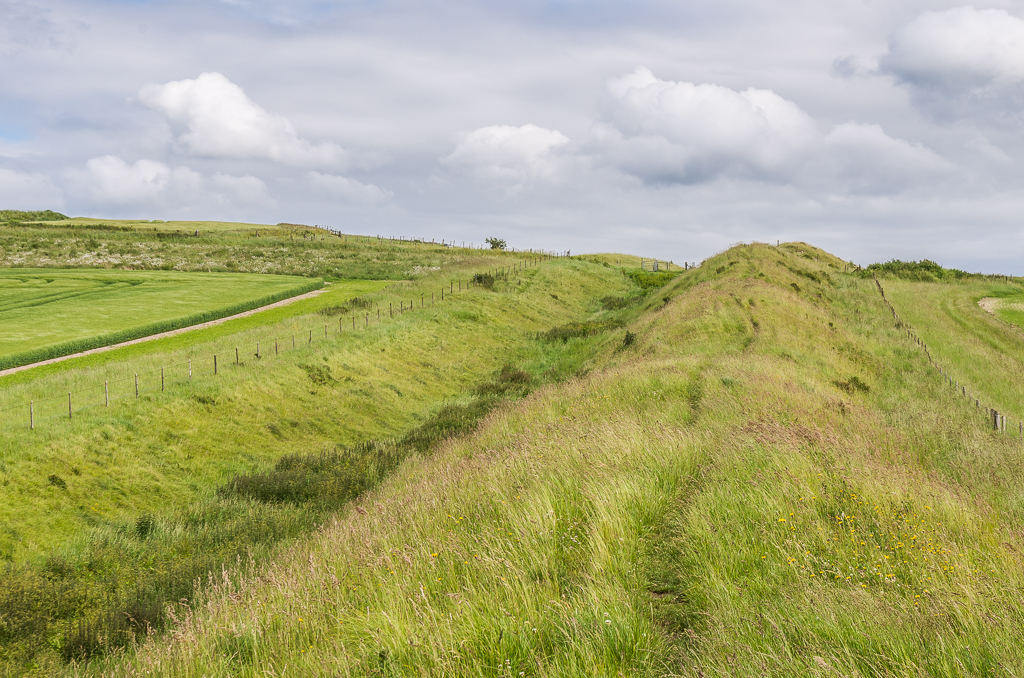
Wansdyke near Bishops Cannings showing the ditch and bank in 2019

Wansdyke consists of two sections, 14 and 19 kilometres (8.7 and 11.8 mi) long with some gaps in between. East Wansdyke is an impressive linear earthwork, consisting of a ditch and bank running approximately east–west, between Savernake Forest and Morgan's Hill. West Wansdyke is also a linear earthwork, running from Monkton Combe south of Bath to Maes Knoll south of Bristol, but less substantial than its eastern counterpart. The middle section, 22 kilometres (14 miles) long, is sometimes referred to as 'Mid Wansdyke', but is formed by the remains of the Roman road from Silchester to Bath. It used to be thought that these sections were all part of one continuous undertaking, especially during the Middle Ages when the pagan name Wansdyke was applied to all three parts. However, this is not now considered to be certain.

== Defence of an unrecorded border ==
Among the largest defensive earthworks in the United Kingdom, Wansdyke may be compared to both Offa's Dyke (later, and forming a Mercian border with Wales) and Hadrian's Wall (earlier, and forming a border between Britannia and Caledonia). There is some evidence that Wansdyke extended west from Maes Knoll to the coast of the Severn Estuary, but this is uncertain.

== Nomenclature and dating ==
The earthwork is named after their god Woden (Odin), possibly indicating that the incoming Anglo-Saxons had no information about the origins of a structure that was there when they arrived, and which was of no significance to locals at that time. Its name occurs in charters of the 9th and 10th century AD. Its relationship to the expansion of the West Saxons was considered in 1964 by J.N.L. Myres, who maintained that Wansdyke was constructed by some sub-Roman authority. Fowler speculates that it was a fortification intended for use against invading Saxons in the 490s, and abandoned when the news of British victory at Mons Badonicus made it redundant. The name 'Woden's Dyke' eventually became Wansdyke.

== East Wansdyke ==
East Wansdyke in Wiltshire, on the south of the Marlborough Downs, has been less disturbed by later agriculture and building, and is more clearly traceable on the ground than the western part. In places, the bank is up to 4 m (13 ft) high and the ditch as much as 2.5 m (8.2 ft) deep. Since at least the tenth century, there have been gaps, "gates", in the work. The ditch is on the north side, so Wansdyke may have been intended by the Romano-Britons as a defence against West Saxons encroaching from the upper Thames Valley westward into what is now the West Country. Fowler suggests that its plan is consistent with those of Roman border fortifications such as Hadrian's Wall: not just a military defence but intended to control locals and travellers along the Wessex Ridgeway. He further suggests that the works were never finished, abandoned in the face of a political change that removed their rationale.

Lieut.-General Augustus Pitt Rivers carried out excavations at the Wansdyke in Wiltshire in the late 19th century, considering it the remains of a great war in which the south-west was being defended. In 1958, Fox and Fox attributed its construction to the pagan Saxons, probably in the late sixth century.

== West Wansdyke ==
Although the antiquarians like John Collinson considered West Wansdyke to stretch from Bathampton Down south east of Bath, to the west of Maes Knoll, a review in 1960 considered that there was no evidence of its existence to the west of Maes Knoll. Keith Gardner refuted this with newly discovered documentary evidence. In 2007, a series of sections were dug across the earthwork which showed that it had existed where there are no longer visible surface remains. It was shown that the earthwork had a consistent design, with stone or timber revetment. There was little dating evidence but it was consistent with either a late Roman or post-Roman date. A paper in "The Last of the Britons" conference in 2007 suggests that the West Wansdyke continues from Maes Knoll to the hill forts above the Avon Gorge and controls the crossings of the river at Saltford and Bristol as well as at Bath.

As there is little archaeological evidence to date the whole section, it may have marked a division between British Celtic kingdoms or have been a boundary with the Saxons. The evidence for its western extension is earthworks along the north side of Dundry Hill, its mention in a charter and a road name.

The area became the border between the Romano-British Celts and the West Saxons following the Battle of Deorham in 577 AD. According to the Anglo-Saxon Chronicle, the Saxon Cenwalh achieved a breakthrough against the Britons, with victories at Bradford on Avon (in the Avon Gap in the Wansdyke) in 652 AD, and further south at the Battle of Peonnum (at Penselwood) in 658 AD, followed by an advance west through the Polden Hills to the River Parrett. It is however significant to note that the names of the early Wessex kings appear to have a Brythonic (British) rather than Germanic (Saxon) etymology.

A 1,330-yard (1,220 m) section of Wansdyke in Odd Down, which has been designated as an Ancient monument, appears on the Heritage at Risk Register as being in unsatisfactory condition and vulnerable due to gardening.

== Modern use of name ==
The Western Wansdyke gave its name to the former Wansdyke district of the county of Avon and the former Wansdyke Parliamentary constituency.

== Route and points of interest ==
| Point | Coordinates (Links to map resources) | OS Grid Ref | Notes |
|---|---|---|---|
| Maes Knoll hillfort | 51.391°N 2.576°W | ST599659 | Maes Knoll |
| Stantonbury Camp | 51.370°N 2.471°W | ST672636 | Stantonbury Camp |
| Joining the River Avon | 51.356°N 2.327°W | ST773620 | Monkton Combe |
| River Avon to Lacock | 51.412°N 2.118°W | ST918681 | Lacock |
| Morgan's Hill | 51.402°N 1.959°W | SU029670 | Morgan's Hill |
| Shepherds' Shore | 51.394°N 1.933°W | SU047661 | |
| Milk Hill | 51.374°N 1.853°W | SU102639 | |
| Shaw House | 51.387°N 1.811°W | SU131654 | |
| Savernake Forest | 51.383°N 1.68°W | SU221649 | Savernake Forest |

== See also ==
- Maes Knoll – Iron Age hillfort in Somerset, England
- Bathampton Down – Limestone plateau in Somerset, England
- Silesian Walls – Earth ramparts in Poland

== Sources ==
- Soldat, Alan (2022). The Quest for Wansdyke. East Knoyle: Hobnob Press. p. 169. ISBN 978-1-914407-38-3.
- Fowler, Peter (2001). "Wansdyke in the Woods: An unfinished Roman military earthwork for a non-event". In Ellis, Peter (ed.). Roman Wiltshire and After: Papers in Honour of Ken Annable. Wiltshire Archaeological and Natural History Society. ISBN 978-0-947723-08-8.
