= Dundry =

Village near Bristol, England

Coordinates: 51.3957°N 2.6389°W

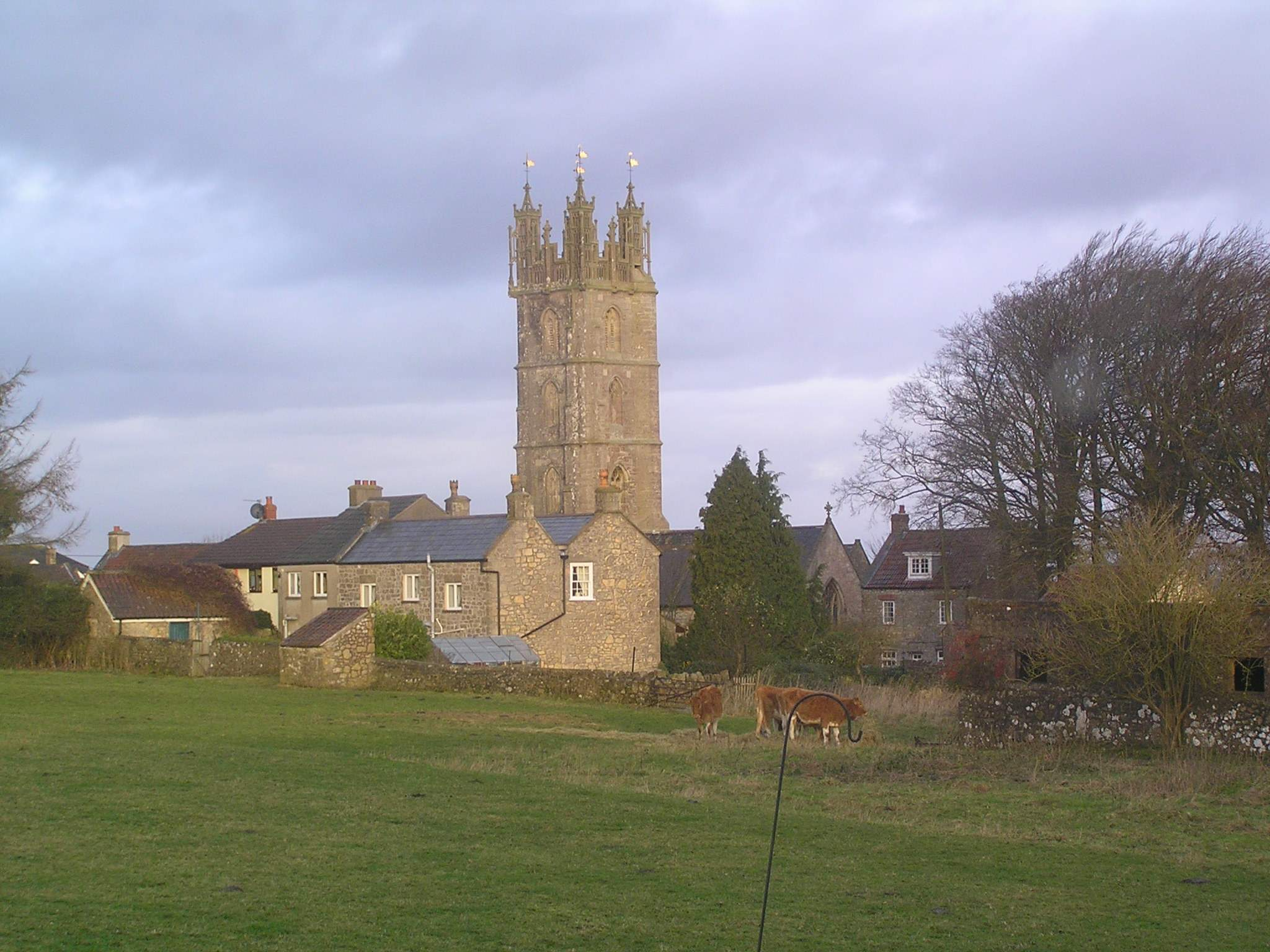
- Dundry church

- Location within Somerset
- Population: 829
- OS grid reference: ST555665
- Unitary authority: North Somerset
- Ceremonial county: Somerset
- Region: South West
- Country: England
- Sovereign state: United Kingdom
- Post town: BRISTOL
- Postcode district: BS41
- Dialling code: 0117
- Police: Avon and Somerset
- Fire: Avon
- Ambulance: South Western
- UK Parliament: North Somerset

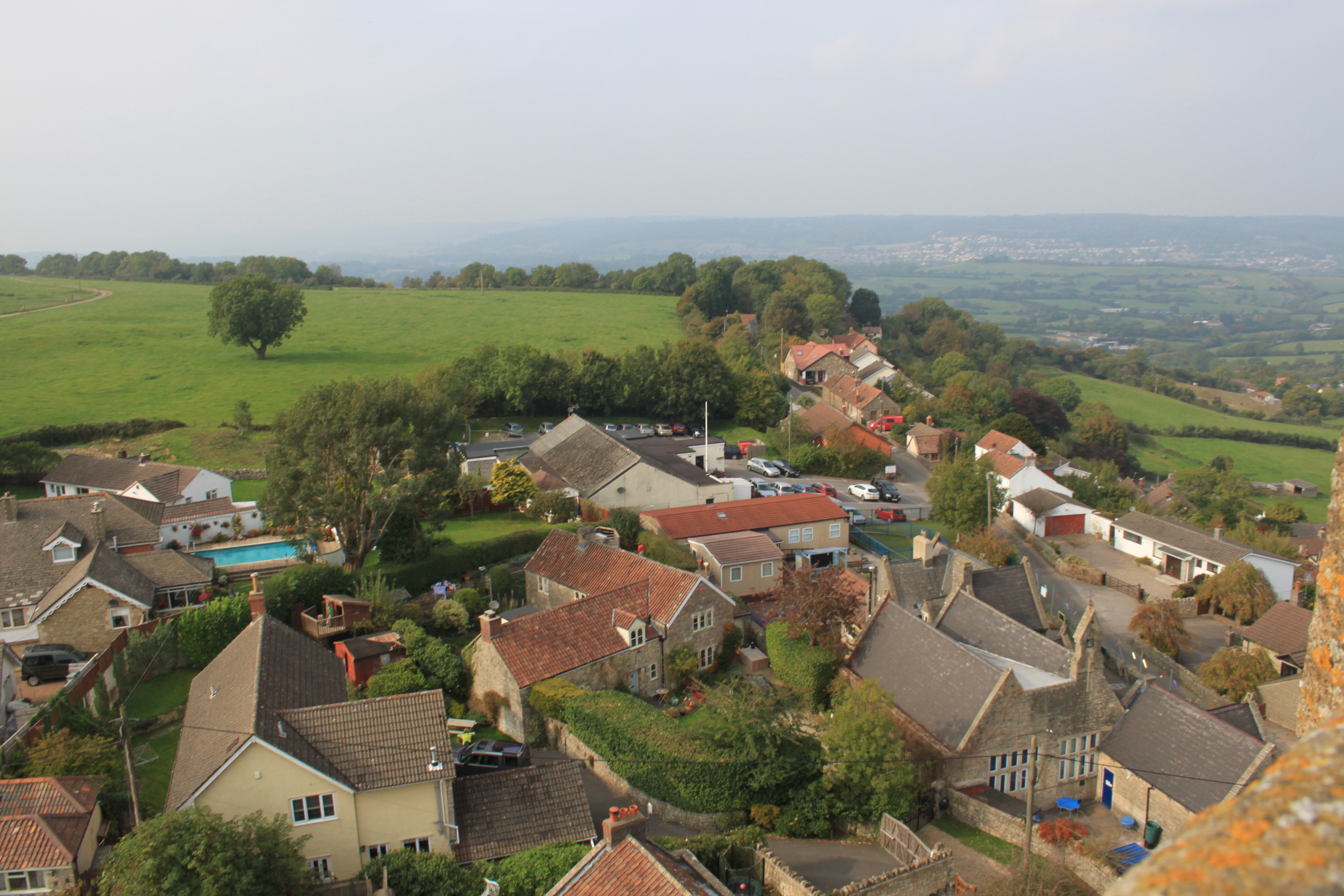
The western part of Dundry village seen from the top of the church tower in 2004

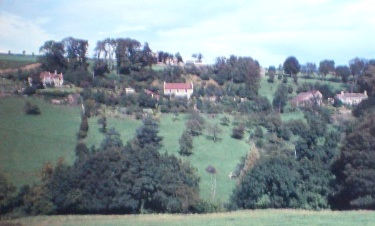
The west part of East Dundry in 1962

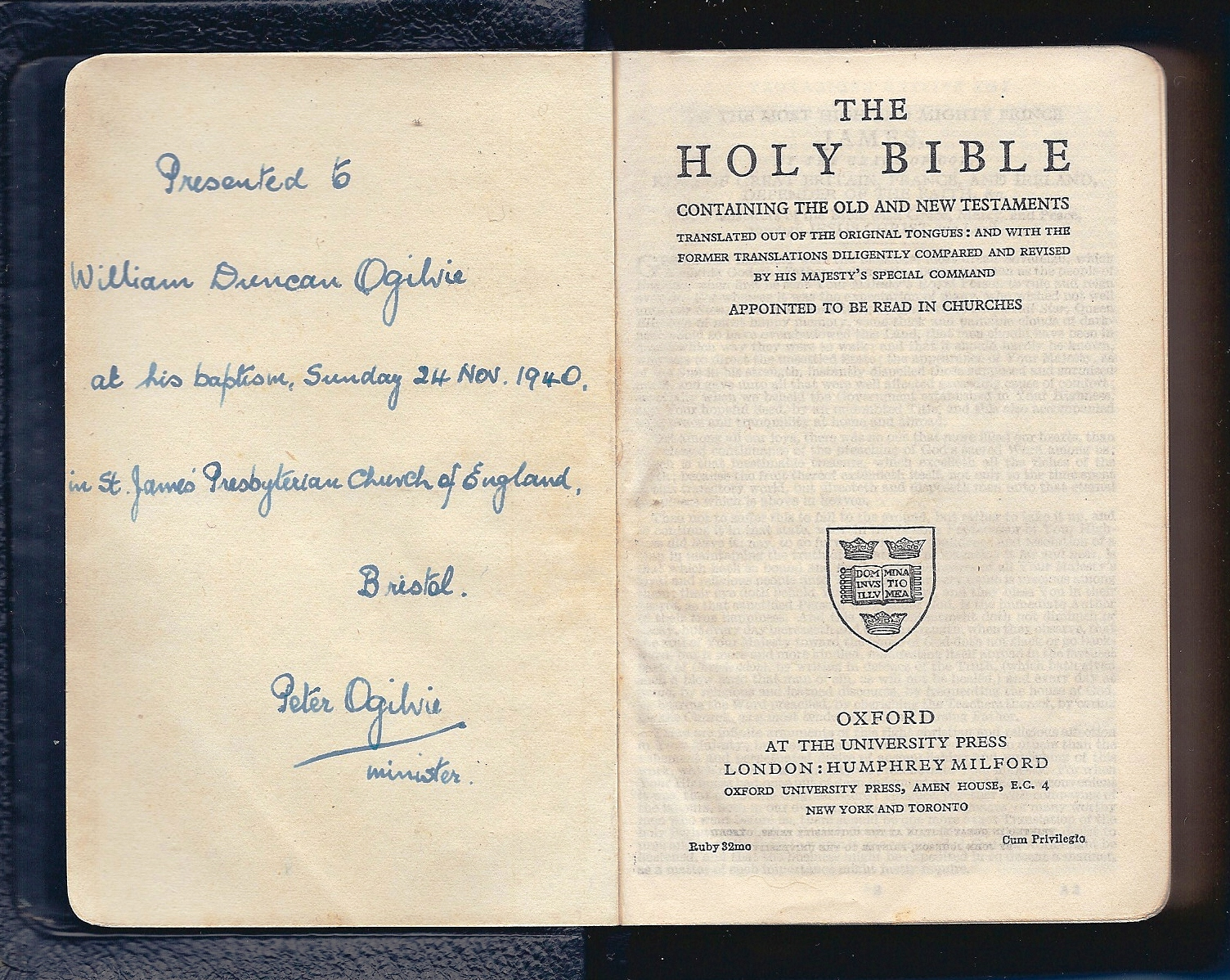
The East Dundry baby nearly bombed during his 24 November 1940 Christening in Bristol

Dundry is a village and civil parish, situated on Dundry Hill in the northern part of the Mendip Hills, between Bristol and the Chew Valley Lake, in the English county of North Somerset, previously Somerset. The parish includes the hamlets of Maiden Head and East Dundry. The parish had a 2011 population of 829.

The village lies on the route of the Monarch's Way long-distance footpath. It is a popular destination for the people of Bristol as it is known for its panoramic views of the city.

== History ==
According to Robinson the name means 'The hill that is dry' from the Old English dun and dryge. An alternative derivation is from a Celtic name, meaning fort of refuge.

The parish was part of the hundred of Chew.

Dundry is notable for its stone: the yellow oolitic limestone from local quarries such as Dundry Main Road, South Quarry and the Dundry Downs (to the west of the village) is found even at Cardiff Castle, a fort originally built by the Romans to defend against Anglo-Saxon invasions. The stone was much used in medieval Bristol: an outstanding example being St Mary Redcliffe, an Anglican church in central Bristol. Dundry stone was extensively important in Ireland after the 12th century Anglo-Norman invasions, being used to build Christ Church Cathedral, Dublin, amongst many other prominent buildings. A large cube of stone (approximately 1.5m each edge) still stands in the churchyard: the cube is much considered to be an early advertisement for Dundry stone.

The neighbouring village of Chew Magna has in its graveyard an early 19th-century limestone round-topped stone which bears the inscription to William Fowler "shot by an Highwayman on Dundry Hill 14 June 1814 aged 32 years".

=== Second World War ===
Being so close to Bristol, Dundry caught many of the 77 air raids (mostly in 1940 and 1941) for which Bristol had:

- 919 tons of high-explosive bombs and myriad incendiary bombs
- 1299 persons killed
- 81,830 houses destroyed.

Many bombs and anti-aircraft shells landed in Dundry. The diary of Doris Ogilvie of East Dundry records that:

- 24 November 1940: Christening of William Duncan [born in East Dundry] at St James Presbyterian Church, The Barton, Bristol. ... Church completely burned out that night. ... This evening a tremendous air raid began about 6pm – ended about midnight – Bristol was demolished in parts and fires started over a tremendously wide area [148 long-range bombers of Luftwaffe 3]. Glare in the sky reflected on hillside opposite the house [The Dingle, now Dingle House]. Shrapnel fell around the house, but vibration from bombs felt very little here – nearest ones fell North Wick, top fields near Knights [Walnut Farm], Bishopsworth etc. Next day roads partly closed for time bombs. L in Bristol and returned with tales of devastation and the amazingly good organisation and firefighting services."
- 27 November 1940: The Dundry Parish Hall – 86 people sheltered this week who were driven out of Bristol from demolished houses, flooding etc.
- Night of 3 January 1941 "Lawrie [her husband] on Home Guard duty at the wireless station [on Dundry Downs] all night. This night there was a bad raid on Bristol. A good many bombs dropped around Russell's and Knight's farms [North Hill Farm and Walnut Farm, both in East Dundry]: they sound like flocks of starlings coming down. Bad damage done to Bristol. One fell in Russell's bull pen and exploded."
- On 17 January "Preparations for incendiary bombs going on. Small bags of sand and buckets of water to be at every corner of the house — most awkward, but adds a spice to life."
- On 2 February "Lawrie continues his [air-raid] trenching in the kitchen garden"
- On 12 April "Discovered a neat shell cap buried in the lawn, so now we have one like everyone else. This night Lawrie was on fire watch duty from 1 a.m. on. I was alone with D who slept in a basket under the kitchen table. The decoy [see Chew Magna] over the hill, a mile away, caught HEs [high explosive bombs] that night: we only felt vibrations."
- Summer 1942 "All this summer has been unnaturally quiet. Only two bad nights when Bath was blasted and set on fire in May."
- Sunday 15 November 1942 "Church bells were rung everywhere for the first time to celebrate Egypt victory."

=== Dundry Home Guard ===
During World War II members of the Dundry Home Guard had many draughty nights on the top of the church, on Maes Knoll, and (on Dundry Down) at the wireless complex watching out for air raids and possible troop landings by parachute and glider. Captain Knight of Walnut Farm, East Dundry served in the First World War and was in charge of the Dundry Home Guard. Fire watchers turned out to watch for fires whenever there were bombing raids.

500 metres south of Rackledown Farm in East Dundry, there was a Civil Bombing QL decoy site, C1C. It was built as part of the 'C-series' of civil decoys. This QL site operated from the same operations room as a permanent Starfish site SF1B that was located 800 metres further south. These sites featured displays of muted lights to appear like urban areas during poor blackouts. Bonfires were also lit to resemble buildings under attack with the intention of tricking the bombers to release the bomb load before arriving over Bristol. In 1941, there was a Home Guard exercise for Dundry and neighbouring villages including Winford, Bishopsworth, Leigh Woods and Norton Malreward.

=== 1968 storm ===
On 10 July 1968 a storm deluged the parish and neighbouring areas—172 mm (6.8 in) of rain was measured in Chew Stoke, and local streams such as Winford Brook were swollen by rain running off the slopes of Dundry Hill.

== Governance ==
The parish council has responsibility for local issues, including setting an annual precept (local rate) to cover the council's operating costs and producing annual accounts for public scrutiny. The parish council evaluates local planning applications and works with the local police, district council officers, and neighbourhood watch groups on matters of crime, security, and traffic. The parish council's role also includes initiating projects for the maintenance and repair of parish facilities, such as the village hall or community centre, playing fields and playgrounds, as well as consulting with the district council on the maintenance, repair, and improvement of highways, drainage, footpaths, public transport, and street cleaning. Conservation matters (including trees and listed buildings) and environmental issues are also of interest to the council.

The parish is in the unitary authority of North Somerset which was created in 1996, as established by the Local Government Act 1992. This act established a single tier of local government with responsibility for almost all local government functions within its area including local planning and building control, local roads, council housing, environmental health, markets and fairs, refuse collection, recycling, cemeteries, crematoria, leisure services, parks, and tourism. It is also responsible for education, social services, libraries, main roads, public transport, trading standards, waste disposal and strategic planning, although fire, police and ambulance services are provided jointly with other authorities through the Avon Fire and Rescue Service, Avon and Somerset Constabulary and the South Western Ambulance Service.

North Somerset's area covers part of the ceremonial county of Somerset but it is administered independently of the non-metropolitan county. Its administrative headquarters is in the town hall in Weston-super-Mare. Between 1 April 1974 and 1 April 1996, it was the Woodspring district of the county of Avon. Before 1974 that the parish was part of the Long Ashton Rural District.

The parish is represented in the House of Commons of the Parliament of the United Kingdom as part of the North Somerset constituency. It elects one Member of Parliament (MP) by the first past the post system of election. Since 2024 the MP has been Labour's Sadik Al-Hassan. It was also part of the South West England constituency of the European Parliament prior to Britain leaving the European Union in January 2020, which elected seven MEPs using the d'Hondt method of party-list proportional representation.

== Religious sites ==
The Church of St Michael at Dundry is a prominent feature in its hill-top position with its tower visible for many miles around. The four-stage tower was erected by the Society of Merchant Venturers of Bristol as a landmark and is widely visible.

== Transport ==
In the 1940s and 1950s the Ball family of Dundry ran the "Dundry Pioneer" bus service from Dundry Chapel via Dundry Church and the Hairpin Corner into Prince Street in central Bristol with Bedford buses. After the Dundry Pioneer, Bristol buses route 80, renumbered 373 in 1983, served Dundry.

== Notable persons ==
Lawrence Ogilvie (1898–1980), East Dundry, plant pathologist
