= Adlam =

Adlam may refer to:

- Adlam alphabet, a writing system for the Fula languages
  - Adlam (Unicode block)
- Adlam (name), an English surname
