= Ebrima =

Ebrima may refer to:

- Ebrima (name), Gambian given name
- Ebrima (typeface), an OpenType font
