= Adlam (name) =

English surname

Adlam is an English patronymic surname derived from the Old German given name Adalhelm, meaning "noble protector" or "noble helmet". It appears not to be derived from the Anglo-Saxon cognate, Æðelhelm, which took different forms in later years, but instead to have come from continental Europe with Norman French. As a given name, "Adelelmus" appears in the 1086 Domesday Book for Kent, and patronymic forms occur in 12th century England, such as Walterus filius Adelam and Robertus Adelelmus. Variants of the surname include Adlem, Odlam and Adlum.

In England, the name Adlam is most common in Wiltshire. An Adlam family were significant landowners in Somerset and Wiltshire, particularly in Chew Magna and Meare, and as owners of the manor of Chew Magna and Manor Farmhouse, Meare.

The name may refer to:

- Adrian Adlam (born 1963), British musician
- Alanzo Adlam (born 1989), Jamaican football player
- Leslie Adlam (1897–1975), British football player
- Samuel Adlam Bayntun (1804–1833), British soldier and member of House of Commons 1830–1833
- Tom Adlam (1893–1975), British soldier
- Warwick Adlam (b. 1971), Australian cricketer

== See also ==
- Adlam alphabet
- George Adlam & Sons, British engineering company
