= Manor House, Chew Magna =

Manor House
- Location within Somerset
- 51°22′01″N 2°37′04″W
- Location: Chew Magna, Somerset, England

History
- Built: 1656

Listed Building – Grade II*
- Official name: The Manor House
- Designated: 21 September 1960
- Reference no.: 1129609

The Manor House in Chew Magna, Somerset, England, was a country house built in the mid-17th century. It was the principal residence of the Adlam family from the mid-1800s until 1940. The house is a Grade II* listed building and was part of the Sacred Heart Convent School. It has now been redeveloped and returned to residential use.

== History ==
The four-storey manor house has Tudor origins, including a fireplace dated 1656. It incorporates a tower which remains from an earlier building on the site which dates from the late 15th or early 16th century. It was built for Sir Richard Vickris who was the High Sheriff of Bristol. Among the brought-in pieces in the house are two South German reliefs, "The Martyrdoms of St Catherine and St Sebastian", from an altar of the early 16th century. There are also a series of panels in the Floris style, probably Flemish and with a repeating date 1562.

From 1680 to 1824, the Manor House was the home of prominent Quaker families including the Vickris, the Summers and the Harfords. William Penn preached here in 1687.

In the 1860s, the house was remodelled in a Gothic Revival Style by John Norton for William Adlam. The house stayed in the Adlam family until being handed over to the British Army in the 1940s. The majority of the exterior dates from this period, although some internal features have survived from the earlier work.

In 1940, the house was requisitioned by the army and then abandoned when they found it had no electricity, running water or modern sanitation. It was then bought by the Sisters of the Order of Our Lady of the Missions who opened a convent and boarding school, which included the construction of several ancillary buildings within the grounds. The senior school closed in 1986 but a junior school continued until 2006. The building and the surrounding site has since been redeveloped and restored for residential use.

== Grounds ==
The house had 4.9 acres (20,000 m^{2}) of gardens laid out in the 19th century, which were later used to build the convent school.

Two of the stables attached to the Manor House are Grade II listed.

Recent redevelopment has included demolition of some of the convent school buildings and the development of a courtyard of four large private homes within the grounds.
