= Norton Malreward =

Village and civil parish in Somerset, England

Coordinates: 51.3877°N 2.573°W

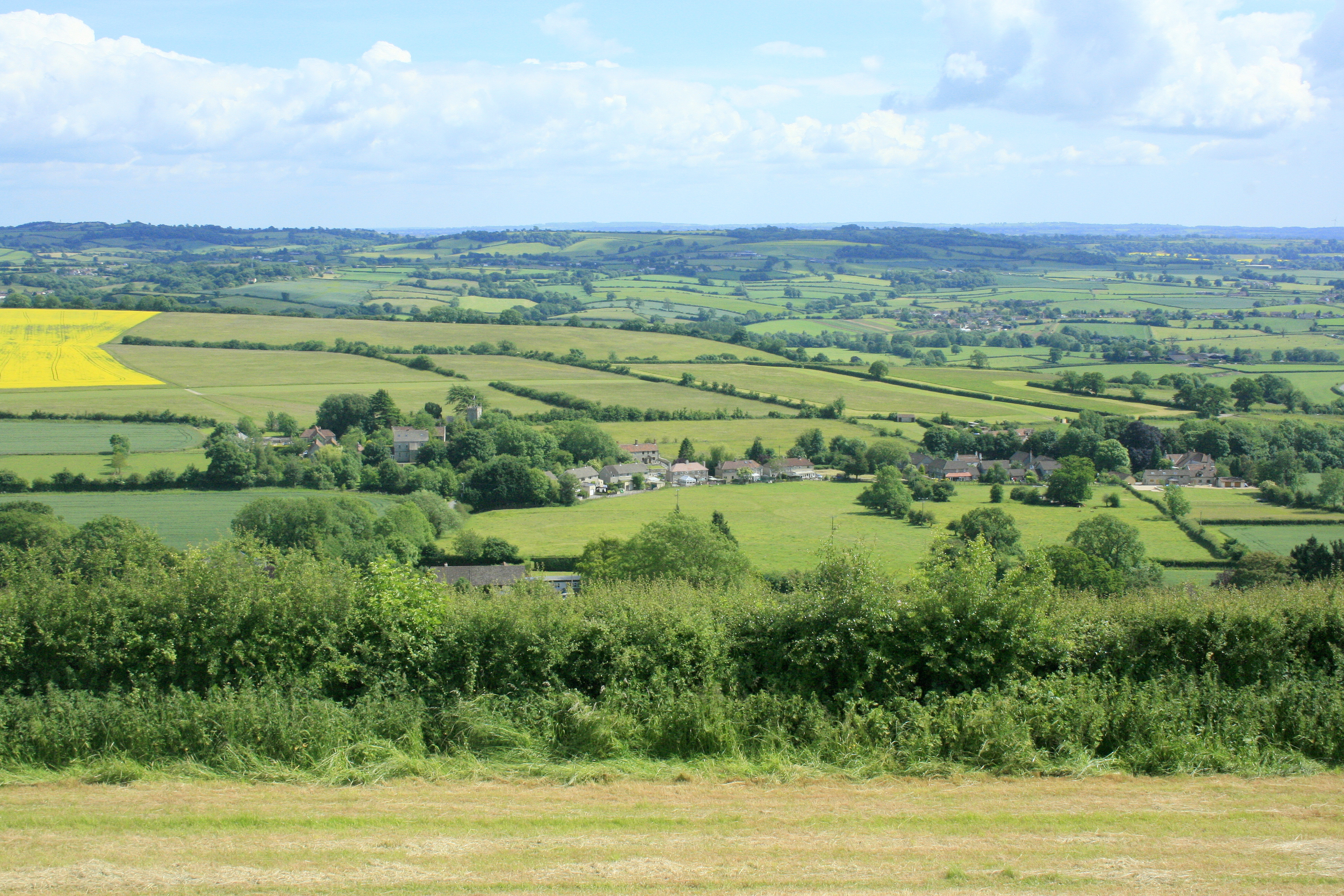
- Norton Malreward from Maes Knoll

- Location within Somerset
- Population: 246 (2011)
- OS grid reference: ST600660
- Unitary authority: Bath and North East Somerset
- Ceremonial county: Somerset
- Region: South West
- Country: England
- Sovereign state: United Kingdom
- Post town: BRISTOL
- Postcode district: BS39
- Dialling code: 01275
- Police: Avon and Somerset
- Fire: Avon
- Ambulance: South Western
- UK Parliament: North East Somerset and Hanham

Norton Malreward is a small Somerset village and civil parish 4 miles (6.4 km) south of Bristol, England at the northern edge of the Chew Valley. In 1895 Norton Malreward was combined with the neighbouring hamlet of Norton Hawkfield (also spelt Hautville) into a single parish, which has a population of 246.

== History ==
Norton Malreward is listed as Nortone in the Domesday Book of 1086, meaning 'the north enclosure' (from the Old English norp and tun). Malreward is a corruption of the Norman surname Malregard (lit. ‘evil eye/glance'), that of a tenant of the bishop of Coutances in 1238. During the reign of Edward I the manor was held by John Le Sore of Backwell. Later lords of the manor included Hawisia de Burton, John de Burton, Robert Grayndor, Robert Basset and Sir William Basset. In 1701 the manor was sold to Richard Holder and sold again in 1718 to Francis Freeman and Samuel Prigg.

Just north of and overlooking the village is Maes Knoll Tump, a tumulus 390 by 84 feet (119 m × 26 m), and 45 feet (14 m) in height, the start of the Wansdyke. The remains of this Iron Age hillfort lie at the eastern end of the Dundry Down ridge. The hillfort consists of a fairly large flat open area, roughly triangular in shape, that was fortified by ramparts and shaping of the steep-sided hilltop around the northern, eastern and southwestern sides of the hill (the flat area in World War II was dotted with stone cairns to deter the landing of enemy gliders to invade Bristol; a detachment of the Dundry Home Guard had a draughty corrugated-iron look-out shed on the top of the tumulus). Maes Knoll provides a splendid view over the lands it would have once commanded. From here, there are clear views north to Bristol, east to Bath and the Cotswold Hills, and south over Stanton Drew stone circles to Chew Valley Lake and the Mendip Hills.

The parish was part of the hundred of Chew.

Ammonites and fossil nautili are abundant in this neighbourhood.

The village lies on the route of the Monarch's Way long-distance footpath.

== Governance ==
The parish council has responsibility for local issues, including setting an annual precept (local rate) to cover the council's operating costs and producing annual accounts for public scrutiny. The parish council evaluates local planning applications and works with the local police, district council officers, and neighbourhood watch groups on matters of crime, security, and traffic. The parish council's role also includes initiating projects for the maintenance and repair of parish facilities, such as the village hall or community centre, playing fields and playgrounds, as well as consulting with the district council on the maintenance, repair, and improvement of highways, drainage, footpaths, public transport, and street cleaning. Conservation matters (including trees and listed buildings) and environmental issues are also of interest to the council.

Norton Malreward is part of the Chew Valley North Ward, which is represented by one councillor on the unitary authority of Bath and North East Somerset which was created in 1996, as established by the Local Government Act 1992. It provides a single tier of local government with responsibility for almost all local government functions within its area including local planning and building control, local roads, council housing, environmental health, markets and fairs, refuse collection, recycling, cemeteries, crematoria, leisure services, parks, and tourism. It is also responsible for education, social services, libraries, main roads, public transport, trading standards, waste disposal and strategic planning, although fire, police and ambulance services are provided jointly with other authorities through the Avon Fire and Rescue Service, Avon and Somerset Constabulary and the Great Western Ambulance Service.

Bath and North East Somerset's area covers part of the ceremonial county of Somerset but it is administered independently of the non-metropolitan county. Its administrative headquarters is in Bath. Between 1 April 1974 and 1 April 1996, it was the Wansdyke district and the City of Bath of the county of Avon. Before 1974 that the parish was part of the Clutton Rural District.

The parish is represented in the House of Commons of the Parliament of the United Kingdom as part of North East Somerset and Hanham. It elects one Member of Parliament (MP) by the first past the post system of election.

== Demographics ==
According to the 2001 Census, the Chew Valley North Ward (which includes Chew Magna and Chew Stoke), had 2,307 residents, living in 911 households, with an average age of 42.3 years. Of these 77% of residents describing their health as 'good', 21% of 16- to 74-year-olds had no qualifications; and the area had an unemployment rate of 1.3% of all economically active people aged 16–74. In the Index of Multiple Deprivation 2004, it was ranked at 26,243 out of 32,482 wards in England, where 1 was the most deprived LSOA and 32,482 the least deprived.

== Religious sites ==
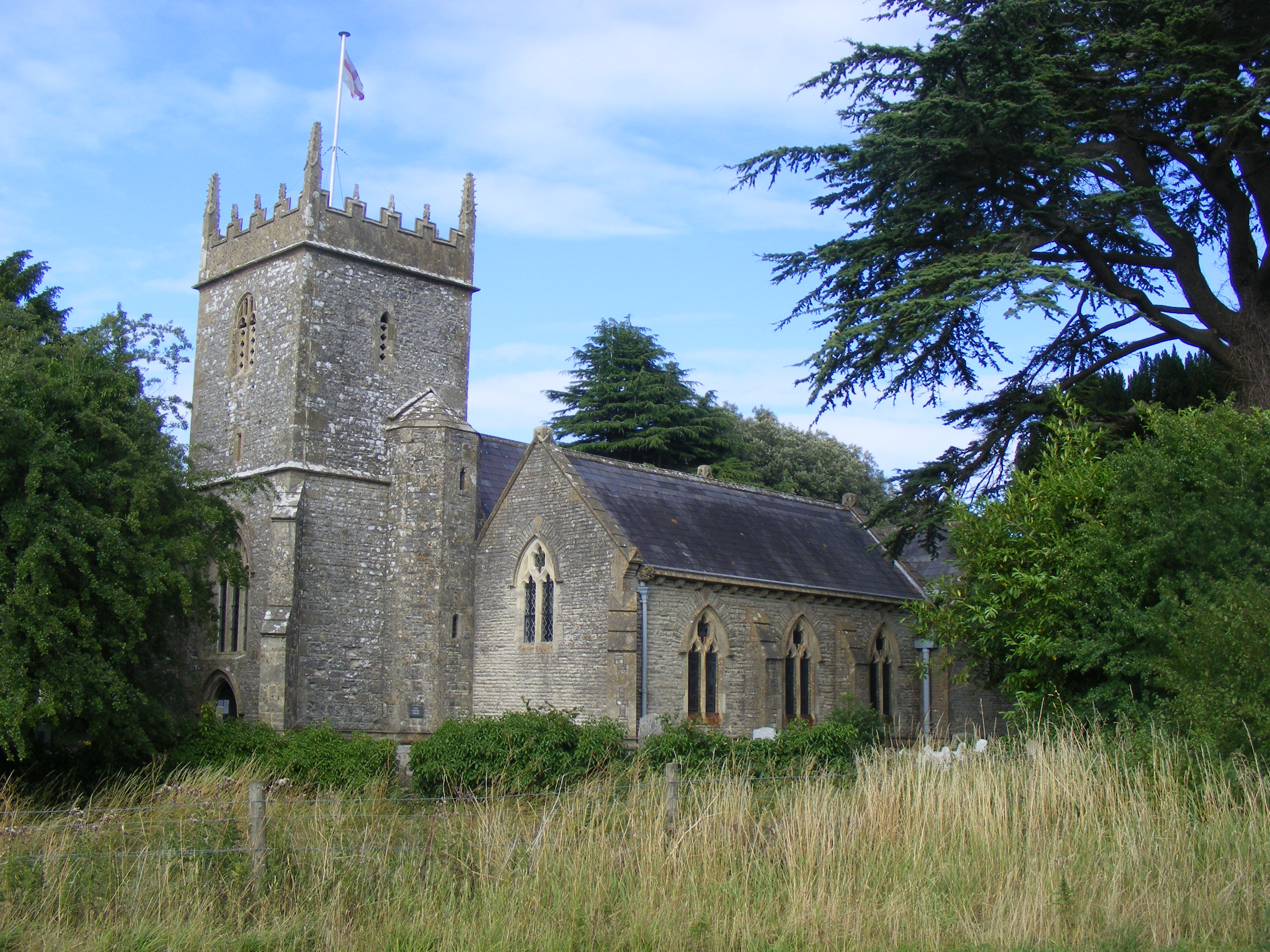
Church of Holy Trinity

The Anglican parish Church of Holy Trinity dates from the late 12th century. The tower which has since been altered was added in the 15th century and rebuilt around 1860 by James Wilson of Bath. It has been designated as a Grade II listed building.

== Grade II listed buildings ==
- Manor Farmhouse
- Barn to south-east of Newbarn Farmhouse
- Newbarn Farmhouse
- Norton Malreward Court
- Stables and Coach-house to north of Norton Malreward Court
- Whitewood Farmhouse
- Model Farm and Farmhouse
- Park Farmhouse
