= Chew Court =

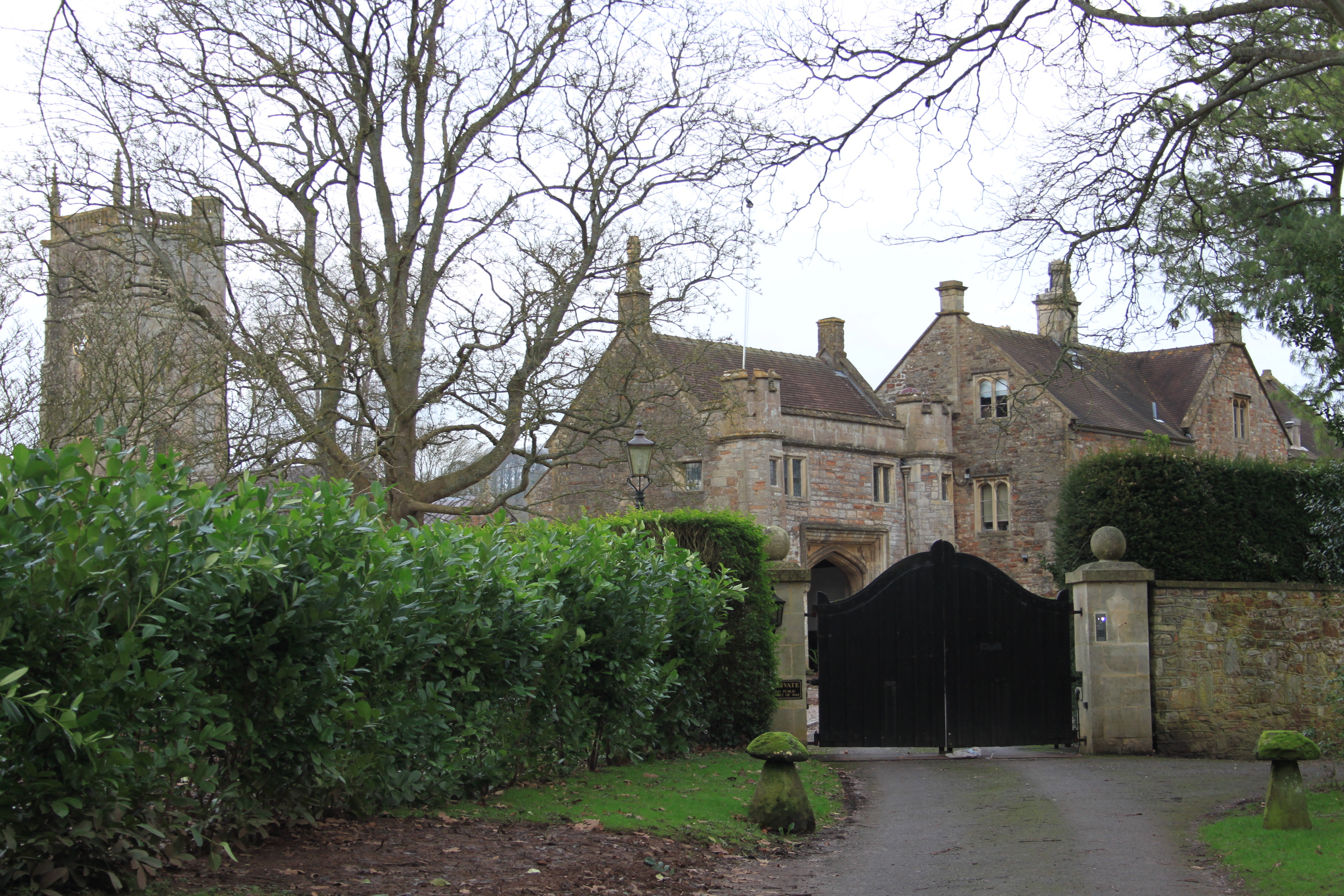
- Chew Court and the tower of the Church of St Andrew

- Location within Somerset
- 51°21′59″N 2°36′26″W
- Location: Chew Magna, Somerset, England

History
- Built: 14th or 15th century

Listed Building – Grade II*
- Official name: Chew Court
- Designated: 21 September 1960
- Reference no.: 1320739

Chew Court is a Grade II* listed building next to St Andrew's church in Chew Magna, Somerset, England.

It was originally a palace for Gisa the Bishop of Bath and Wells, however little of the original building survives. After use by a succession of bishops it was sold to the Duke of Somerset.

The oldest portion is the gatehouse at the southern end of the east wing.

The house was largely rebuilt in 1656, from which a little survives as the Chew Court of today including an Elizabethan doorway with Doric pilasters. The room over the gatehouse is said to have been used as a court-room, with the turrets used for holding prisoners. The house now forms an "l" shape of two wings.

In 2011 alterations were made to the driveway leading to the house and additional walls built around the gardens.

About 45 metres (148 ft) south west of the building is a medieval well, which was later enclosed with a sandstone well house.
