= Adlam (Unicode block) =

- Range: U+1E900..U+1E95F (96 code points)
- Plane: SMP
- Scripts: Adlam
- Assigned: 88 code points
- Unused: 8 reserved code points

Unicode version history
- 9.0 (2016): 87 (+87)
- 12.0 (2019): 88 (+1)

Unicode documentation
- Code chart ∣ Web page

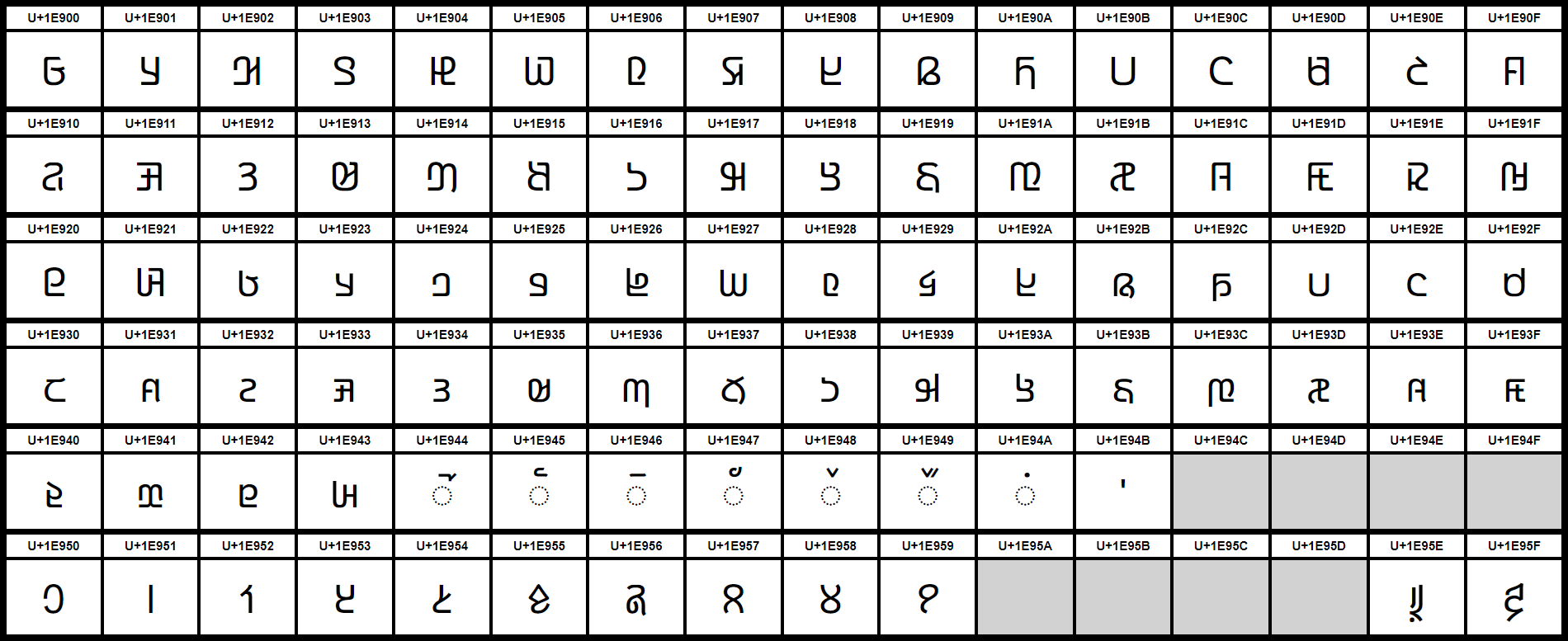
Graphical representation of the Adlam Unicode block

Adlam is a Unicode block containing characters from the Adlam script, an alphabetic script devised during the late 1980s for writing the Fula language.

In June 2016, Adlam was added to the Unicode Standard with the release of version 9.0.

In October 2017, Google released a Noto font that supports the block, Noto Sans Adlam, although it does not handle prenasalized consonants properly.

On 3 October 2018, Microsoft released an updated Ebrima font to support Adlam alphabet to Windows Insiders as part of the Windows 10 version 1903 feature update, starting from build 18252. Again, it does not handle prenasalized consonants properly.

== Block ==
Adlam^{[1]}^{[2]} Official Unicode Consortium code chart (PDF)
	0	1	2	3	4	5	6	7	8	9	A	B	C	D	E	F
U+1E90x	𞤀	𞤁	𞤂	𞤃	𞤄	𞤅	𞤆	𞤇	𞤈	𞤉	𞤊	𞤋	𞤌	𞤍	𞤎	𞤏
U+1E91x	𞤐	𞤑	𞤒	𞤓	𞤔	𞤕	𞤖	𞤗	𞤘	𞤙	𞤚	𞤛	𞤜	𞤝	𞤞	𞤟
U+1E92x	𞤠	𞤡	𞤢	𞤣	𞤤	𞤥	𞤦	𞤧	𞤨	𞤩	𞤪	𞤫	𞤬	𞤭	𞤮	𞤯
U+1E93x	𞤰	𞤱	𞤲	𞤳	𞤴	𞤵	𞤶	𞤷	𞤸	𞤹	𞤺	𞤻	𞤼	𞤽	𞤾	𞤿
U+1E94x	𞥀	𞥁	𞥂	𞥃	𞥄	𞥅	𞥆	𞥇	𞥈	𞥉	𞥊	𞥋				
U+1E95x	𞥐	𞥑	𞥒	𞥓	𞥔	𞥕	𞥖	𞥗	𞥘	𞥙					𞥞	𞥟
Notes 1.As of Unicode version 17.0 2.Grey areas indicate non-assigned code points

== History ==
The following Unicode-related documents record the purpose and process of defining specific characters in the Adlam block:

Version	Final code points (Note: Proposed code points and characters names may differ from final code points and names)	Count	L2 ID	WG2 ID	Document
9.0	U+1E900..1E94A, 1E950..1E959, 1E95E..1E95F	87	L2/13-191	N4488	Everson, Michael (2013-10-28), Preliminary proposal to encode the Adlam script in the SMP of the UCS
9.0	U+1E900..1E94A, 1E950..1E959, 1E95E..1E95F	87	L2/13-210		Anderson, Deborah; Whistler, Ken; McGowan, Rick; Pournader, Roozbeh (2013-10-31), "2", Recommendations to UTC #137 November 2013 on Script Proposals
9.0	U+1E900..1E94A, 1E950..1E959, 1E95E..1E95F	87	L2/14-219R	N4628	Everson, Michael (2014-09-23), Proposal for encoding the Adlam script in the SMP of the UCS
9.0	U+1E900..1E94A, 1E950..1E959, 1E95E..1E95F	87	L2/14-268R		Anderson, Deborah; Whistler, Ken; McGowan, Rick; Pournader, Roozbeh; Iancu, Laurențiu; Glass, Andrew; Constable, Peter; Suignard, Michel (2014-10-27), "9. Adlam", Recommendations to UTC #141 October 2014 on Script Proposals
9.0	U+1E900..1E94A, 1E950..1E959, 1E95E..1E95F	87	L2/14-250		Moore, Lisa (2014-11-10), "Consensus 141-C20", UTC #141 Minutes, "Accept 87 Adlam characters at U+1E900..U+1E95F in block Adlam U+1E900..U+1E95F, with properties as given in L2/14-219R for encoding in a future version of the standard."
9.0	U+1E900..1E94A, 1E950..1E959, 1E95E..1E95F	87	L2/16-052	N4603 (pdf, doc)	Umamaheswaran, V. S. (2015-09-01), "10.2.6", Unconfirmed minutes of WG 2 meeting 63
9.0	U+1E900..1E94A, 1E950..1E959, 1E95E..1E95F	87	L2/19-070		Patel, Neil; Jamra, Mark (2019-01-19), Replacement of Adlam Reference Font in Codesheet to Updated Design
9.0	U+1E900..1E94A, 1E950..1E959, 1E95E..1E95F	87	L2/19-119R	N5076	Patel, Neil; Jamra, Mark; Cornelius, Craig; Barry, Ibrahima; Barry, Abdoulaye (2019-04-19), Replacement of Adlam Reference Font in Codesheet to Updated Design
9.0	U+1E900..1E94A, 1E950..1E959, 1E95E..1E95F	87	L2/19-173		Anderson, Deborah; et al. (2019-04-29), "5. Adlam", Recommendations to UTC #159 April-May 2019 on Script Proposals
9.0	U+1E900..1E94A, 1E950..1E959, 1E95E..1E95F	87	L2/19-122		Moore, Lisa (2019-05-08), "C.14", UTC #159 Minutes
9.0	U+1E900..1E94A, 1E950..1E959, 1E95E..1E95F	87	L2/24-205		Patel, Neil; et al. (2024-08-08), Replacement of Adlam Reference Font in Codesheet to Updated Design
9.0	U+1E900..1E94A, 1E950..1E959, 1E95E..1E95F	87	L2/24-228		Kučera, Jan; et al. (2024-11-01), "4.1 Adlam Glyphs Updates", Recommendations to UTC #181 (November 2024) on Script Proposals
9.0	U+1E900..1E94A, 1E950..1E959, 1E95E..1E95F	87	L2/24-221		Constable, Peter (2024-11-12), "Consensus 181-C41", UTC #181 Minutes, "Change the chart font for the Adlam script to a new version of the Ebrima font"
12.0	U+1E94B	1	L2/18-282		Barry, Abdoulaye; Barry, Ibrahima; Constable, Peter; Glass, Andrew (2018-08-26), Proposal to encode ADLAM LETTER APOSTROPHE for ADLaM script
12.0	U+1E94B	1	L2/18-274		McGowan, Rick (2018-09-14), "Feedback on an Encoding Proposal L2/18-282", Comments on Public Review Issues (July 24 - Sept 14, 2018)
12.0	U+1E94B	1	L2/18-300		Anderson, Deborah; et al. (2018-09-14), "3. Adlam", Recommendations to UTC #157 on Script Proposals
12.0	U+1E94B	1	L2/18-282R	N5022	Barry, Abdoulaye; Barry, Ibrahima; Constable, Peter; Glass, Andrew (2018-11-17), Proposal to encode ADLAMNASALIZATION MARKfor ADLaM script
12.0	U+1E94B	1	L2/18-272		Moore, Lisa (2018-10-29), "C.7", UTC #157 Minutes

== See also ==
- Numerals in Unicode
