= Holy Trinity Church, Norton Malreward =

Church in Somerset, England

Holy Trinity Church
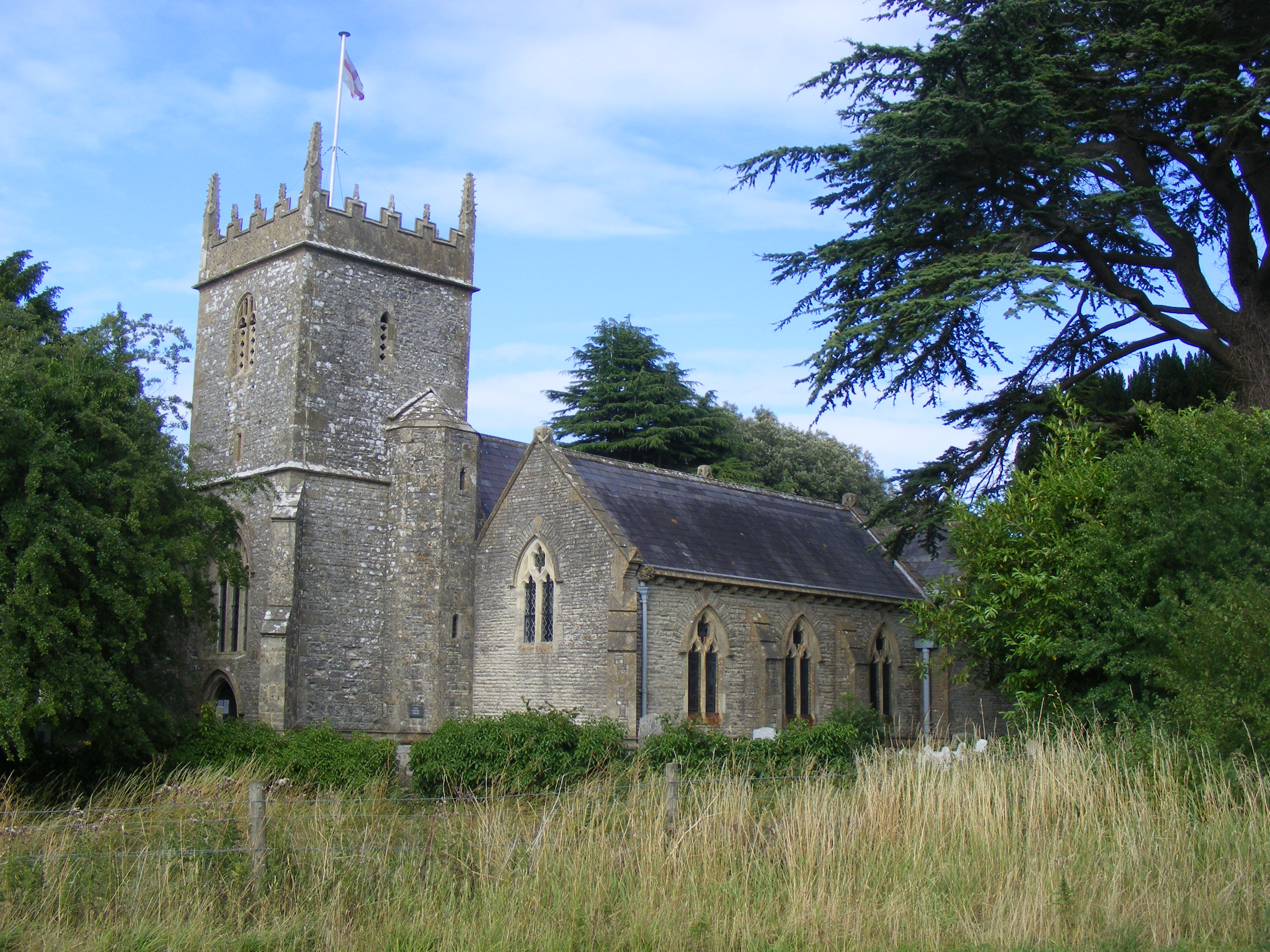

- Location within Somerset
- 51°22′59″N 02°34′16″W
- Location: Norton Malreward, Somerset, England

Listed Building – Grade II
- Official name: Church of Holy Trinity
- Designated: 21 September 1960
- Reference no.: 1312818

The Anglican Holy Trinity Church in Norton Malreward, Somerset, England dates from the late 12th century. It has been designated as a Grade II listed building.

The archway between the nave and chancel and the font remain from the original Norman church, however much of the rest of the building has been revised and expanded over the centuries. The 40 feet (12 m) two stage west tower was added in the 15th century with diagonal buttresses to the lower stage and rebuilt, along with much of the church, around 1860 by James Wilson of Bath. It is surmounted by battlements and pinnacles.

The church is within a joint benefice with the Church of St Andrew, Chew Magna and the Church of St Michael, Dundry.

== See also ==
- List of ecclesiastical parishes in the Diocese of Bath and Wells
