= St Andrew's Church, Chew Magna =

Church in Somerset, England

Church of St Andrew
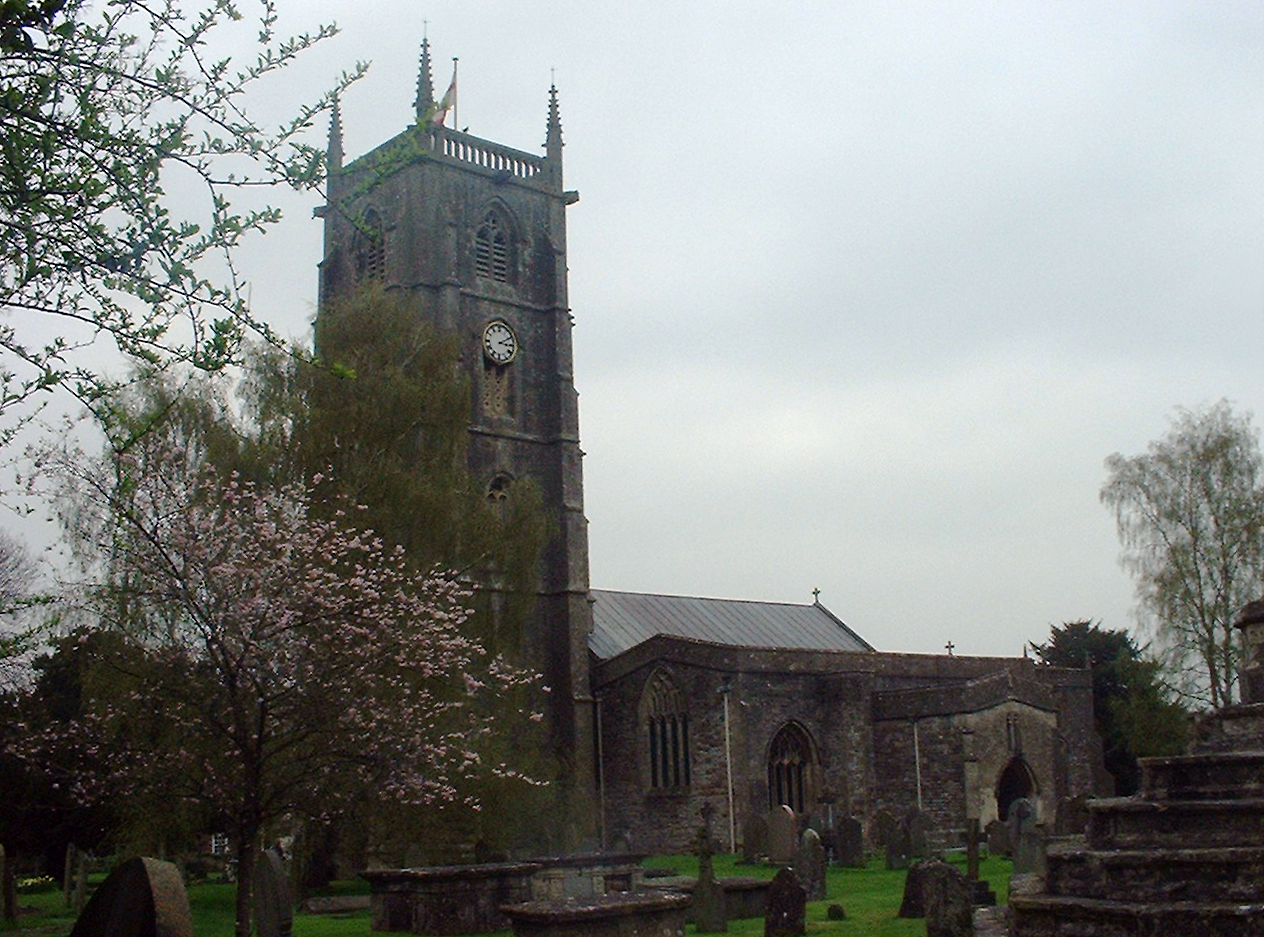

- Location within Somerset
- 51°22′00″N 2°36′35″W
- Location: Chew Magna, Somerset, England

History
- Built: 12th century

Listed Building – Grade I
- Official name: Church of St Andrew
- Designated: 21 September 1960
- Reference no.: 1129613

The Church of St Andrew in Chew Magna, Somerset, England dates from the 12th century with a large 15th-century pinnacled sandstone tower, a Norman font and a rood screen that is the full width of the church. It is a Grade I listed building.

== History ==
The church was restored in 1860 and has a register commencing in 1562. The tower is about one hundred feet tall and was probably built about 1440.

There has been a clock on the tower since the early 18th century. There is a peal of eight bells in the tower. Tenor 28 cwt in C. The original five bells were re-cast by the celebrated Thomas Bilbie of Chew Stoke in 1735 to make a peal of six, and in 1898 four of these were re-cast and two were repaired by Messrs. Mears and Stainbank of London to commemorate the Diamond Jubilee of Queen Victoria. Two additional bells, the gift of Brigadier Ommanney, were added in 1928 to complete the octave, which still contains two of the Bilbie bells. The present clock, installed in 1903, plays a verse of a hymn every four hours, at 8 am, noon, 4 and 8 pm, with a different hymn tune for every day of the week.

It is next to Chew Court which was originally a palace for Gisa the Bishop of Bath and Wells,

Thomas Minor was baptized in St. Andrew's in 1608. A modern plaque is mounted on St. Andrew's wall to commemorate the event. He then migrated to America in 1629, becoming one of the founders of Stonington, Connecticut. The Thomas Minor Society documents his history and genealogy.

The church is within the joint benefice with the Church of St Michael, Dundry and Holy Trinity Church, Norton Malreward.

== Churchyard ==
The churchyard contains several monuments which are Grade II listed buildings in their own right: the churchyard cross, Edgell monument, Fowler monument and a group of three unidentified monuments. In addition there is an early 19th-century limestone round-topped stone which bears the inscription to William Fowler "shot by an Highwayman on Dundry Hill June 14th 1814 aged 32 years", and Commonwealth war grave of a Royal Air Force officer of World War II.

== Interior memorials ==
Within the church are wooden plaques commemorating the nineteen people from the village who died in World War I and seven from World War II, and a bronze plaque to an individual soldier who died in 1917.

In the church are several memorials to the Stracheys of Sutton Court together with a wooden effigy of a Knight cross-legged and leaning on one elbow, in 15th-century armour, thought to be of Sir John de Hauteville or a descendant, and possibly transferred from a church at Norton Hautville before it was demolished. Another effigy in the north chapel is of Sir John St Loe, who was over 7 feet (2 m) tall, and his lady. The armoured figure is 7 feet 4 inches (2.24 m) long and his feet rest on a lion, while those of his lady rest on a dog. This effigy is notable for its detailed depiction of late medieval plate armour, interpreted in carved limestone quarried from Dundry rather than the alabaster typical of most effigies from the era. Despite damage and weathering, it remains one of the most faithful surviving representations of Italian export armour in England. The church also houses the final resting place of Sir Edward Baber (1530-1578) son of Sir John Baber. He was Sergeant at Law and husband to Lady Catherine Leigh-Baber, the daughter of Sir Thomas Leigh, Lord Mayor of London under Queen Elizabeth I.

The church also contains several important late 17th- and early 18th-century monumental brasses set within the chancel. These include a substantial wall-mounted brass commemorating Gabriel Goodman (d. 1679) and two of his sons, arranged within an architectural stone surround with painted heraldry and decorative motifs, as well as floor brasses marking the burials of Elizabeth Cory, wife of the vicar Michael Cory (d. 1690), and Mary Clarke of Chipley (d. 1705), heiress of the Jepp family of Sutton Court.

== See also ==
- List of Grade I listed buildings in Bath and North East Somerset
- List of towers in Somerset
- List of ecclesiastical parishes in the Diocese of Bath and Wells
