= St Michael's Church, Dundry =

Church in Somerset, England

Parish church of St Michael the Archangel
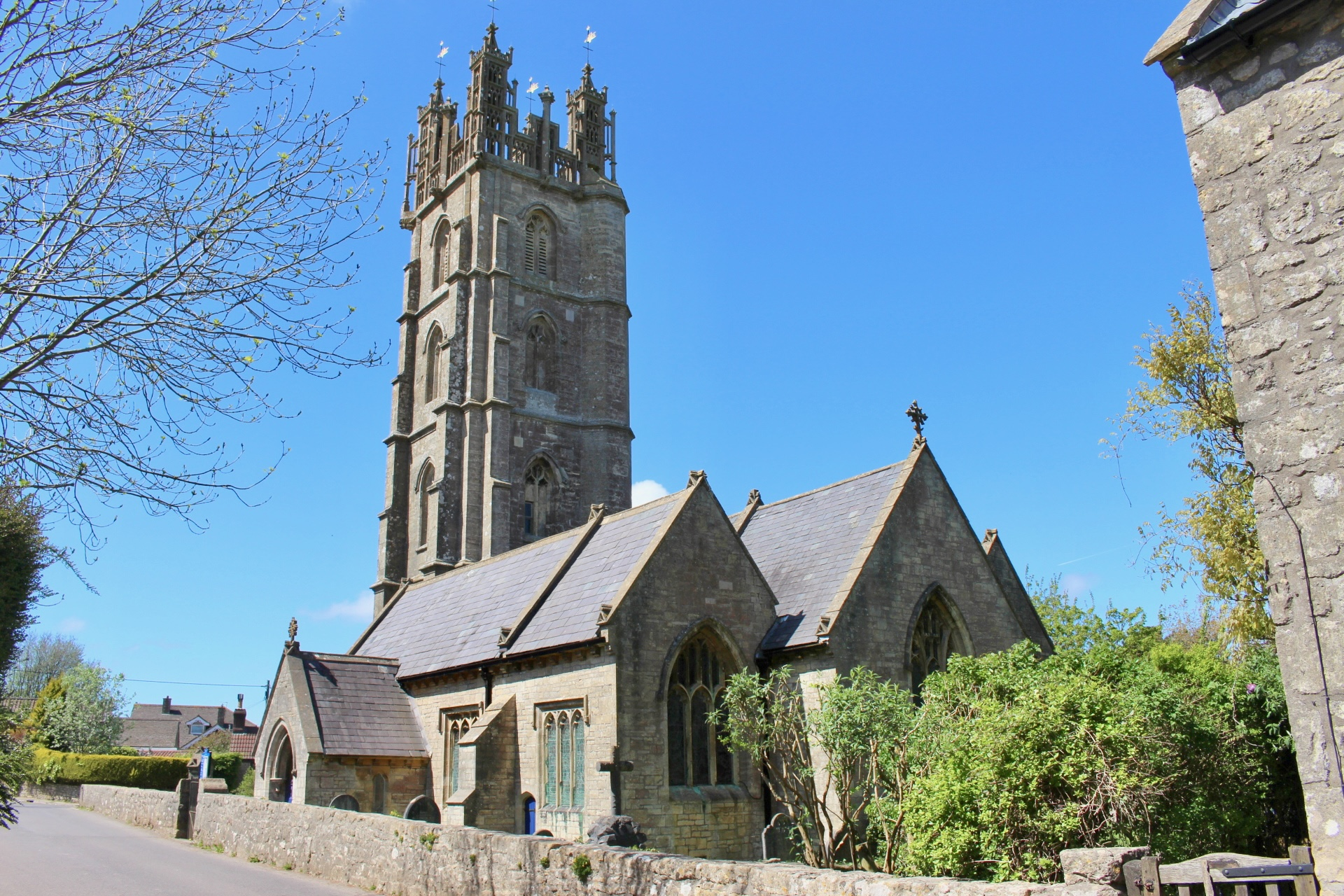

- Location within Somerset

General information
- Location: Dundry, England
- Coordinates: 51.3990°N 2.6373°W

The parish church of St Michael the Archangel in Dundry, Somerset, England has a tower which was built in 1484, with the rest dated 1861. It has been designated as a Grade I listed building.

== History ==
The four-stage tower was erected, around 1484, as a landmark and is visible from many parts of Avon.

The rest of the church was built in 1861 by G.B. Gabriel, replacing the previous medieval building.

The church became part of a joint benefice with the Church of St Andrew, Chew Magna in 1977 and in 2000 were joined by Holy Trinity Church, Norton Malreward.

In 2015 the church was closed because of safety concerns due to falling plaster from the ceiling. Repairs to the roof were estimated to cost £225,000. Following a fundraising campaign, which included grants from the Heritage Lottery Fund and others, the church was able to re-open in September 2018 after extensive renovations.

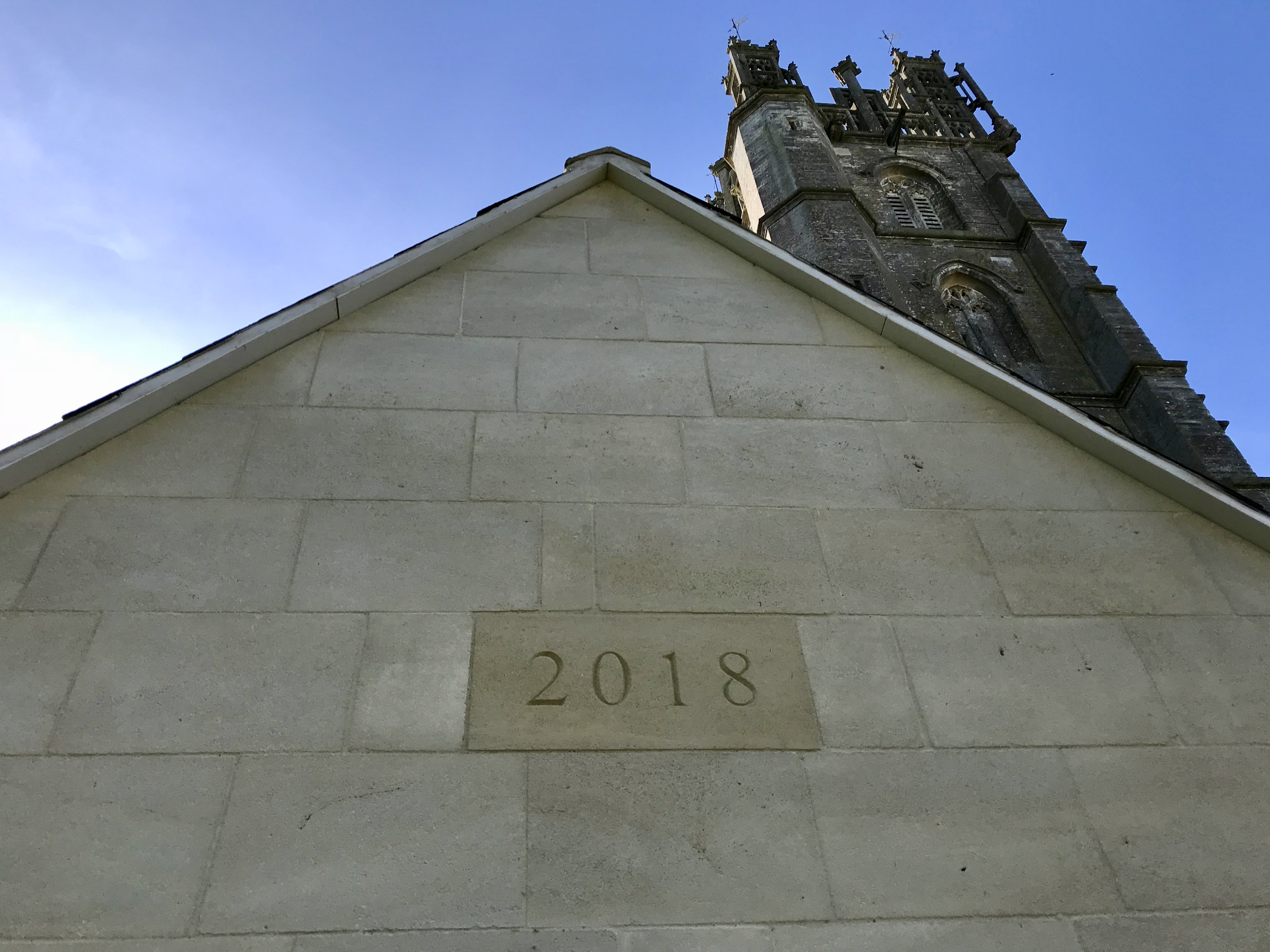
2018 extension to the church

== Churchyard ==
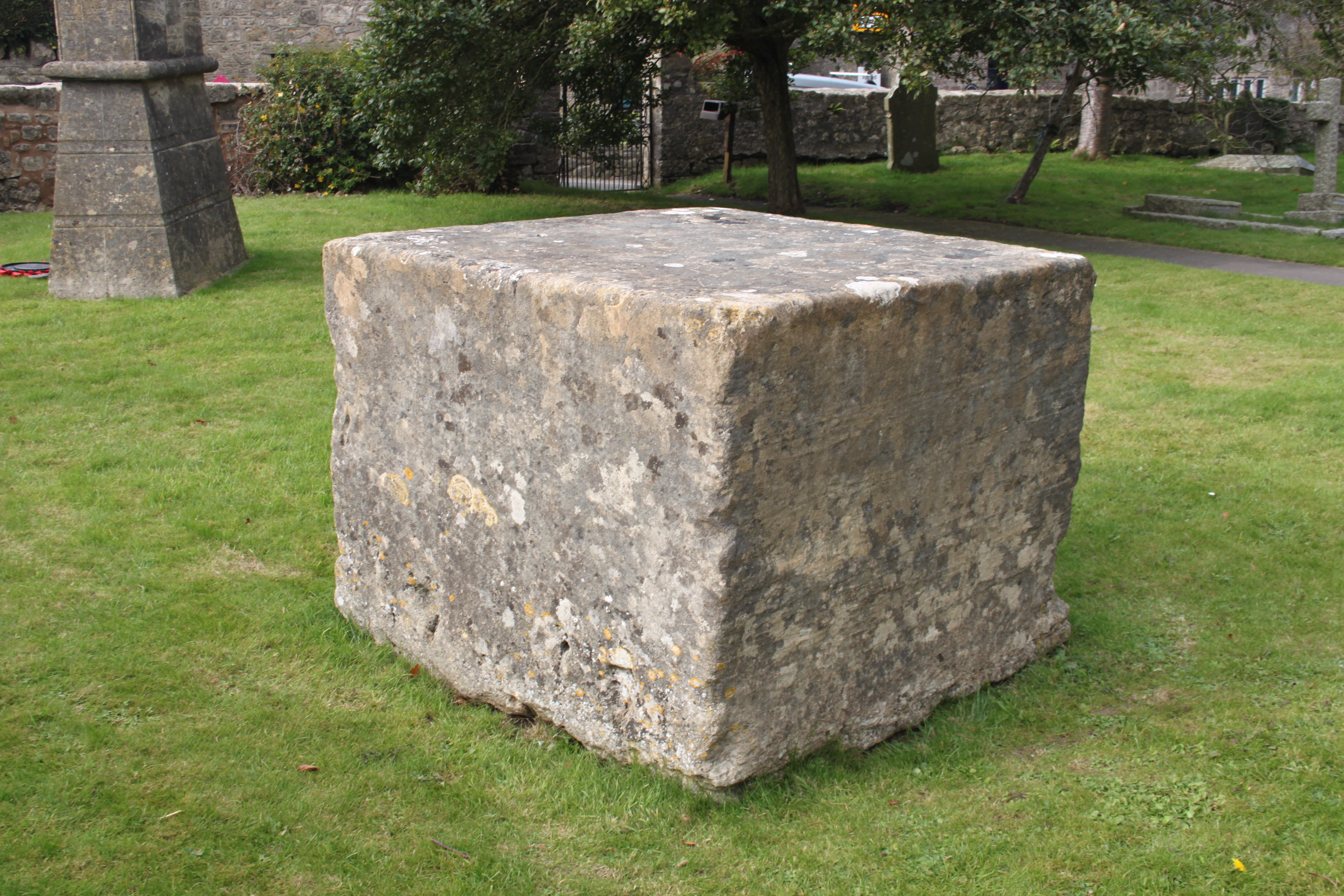
The Dole Stone

Outside the church is a 5 feet (1.5 m) cube of dressed stone, from Dundry Main Road South Quarry. It known as the dole table, which was used to give alms to the poor. There is also a 3 metres (9.8 ft) high churchyard cross on an octagonal base. The head of the cross was installed in the 19th century to the same design as one which had previously occupied the site. It has been scheduled as an ancient monument.

Chest tombs in the churchyard include those to the Dowling family which is thought to date from the mid 18th century, and one of the same age to the Holbrook family.

== Architecture ==
The four-stage tower is 97 feet (30 m) high and is a prominent feature in its hill-top position with its tower visible for many miles around. It is supported by buttresses and is topped by four corner turrets with a polygonal north east stair turret. The earliest of the six bells in the tower was made in 1642. The church consists of a nave, chancel, and chapel, with north and south aisles all surmounted by slate roofs.

== See also ==
- List of Grade I listed buildings in North Somerset
- List of towers in Somerset
- List of ecclesiastical parishes in the Diocese of Bath and Wells
