= Warwick Adlam =

Australian cricketer

Personal information
- Full name: Warwick James Adlam
- Born: 16 February 1971 (age 55)
- Batting: Left-handed
- Bowling: Right-arm fast-medium

Career statistics
Competition	List A
Matches	7
Runs scored	27
Batting average	5.40
100s/50s	0/0
Top score	16
Balls bowled	270
Wickets	3
Bowling average	73.33
5 wickets in innings	0
10 wickets in match	0
Best bowling	1/27
Catches/stumpings	2/0
- Source: CricketArchive, 25 June 2016

Warwick James Adlam (born 16 February 1971) is an Australian cricketer, who played for New South Wales in List A cricket, as well as Australia at Under 19 level.

== Cricket career ==
Adlam debuted in first grade in Sydney Grade Cricket for Gordon in 1989, and in December 1989 he was selected to represent New South Wales in the Barclays Bank interstate Under-19's cricket championship. He was noted as being part of the most damaging pace attack in the competition. In January 1990 he was selected to represent Australia in a Youth One-Day International against an England youth side in Canberra, the first between the two countries since 1983, and in November the same year he was selected for the Australian Institute of Sport Academy XI in a match against an ACT side which was for potential Test players. He was described as the "most troublesome" AIS bowler in a match report, and moved to Adelaide to attend the Australian Cricket Academy. In December 1990 he was selected in a special Bradman XI captained by retired Test cricketer Doug Walters which played the touring English international side.

As of April 1991 Adlam had returned to Sydney and he was recalled to the Gordon first grade team for the grade cricket final and took 5 for 45 to help Gordon win its second consecutive premiership. He said after the game "I was surprised to be called up but stoked to be wanted by the club." In November 1992 he was selected for the New South Wales Second XI to replace Richard Stobo, and he was described as having a "strong performance with the ball" which was followed by a "competent effort with the bat" showing his ability as an all-rounder, with him taking 6–27 with the ball and scoring a 50 in his first match against the ACT.

Adlam moved from Gordon to North Sydney for grade cricket in 1993. He made his List A debut for New South Wales in the 1993/94 season playing one match in which he scored 3 runs and did not take a wicket. In October 1994 he was recalled into the NSW List A side, but struggled again scoring 7 runs at an average of 3.5 and taking 2 wickets at an average of 36.5 in his two List A games of the 1994/95 season. He did not play in the 1995/96 season, but was recalled again in the 1996/97 season playing two games and struggling again scoring just one run and taking no wickets.

Adlam moved from North Sydney to Mosman in grade cricket in 1998 and played for Mosman until 2008, playing 200 games for the club and taking over 300 wickets. After his retirement from grade cricket he continued playing for the clubs Masters side and he was still playing as of 2014 when he was named a life member of the club, and he filled in for the Mosman fifth grade side for one game taking 2–6 with the ball in 2016. He was also serving as general manager of the club as of 2014, and as of 2021 he was Junior Division President of the club.
