= Ebrima (name) =

Male given name

Ebrima is a Gambian given name, a variant of the name Ibrahim. Notable people with the name include:

- Ebrima Manneh (1978-2008), Gambian journalist
- Ebrima Ebou Sillah (born 1980), Gambian football forward
- Ebrima Jatta (footballer, born 1987), Gambian football midfielder and defender
- Ebrima Sohna (born 1988), Gambian football midfielder
- Ebrima Adams (born 1998), Gambian football defensive midfielder for Derby County
- Ebrima Buaro (born 2000), Gambian swimmer
- Ebrima Colley (born 2000), Gambian football midfielder for Young Boys
- Ebrima Darboe (born 2001), Gambian football defensive midfielder for Frosinone
- Ebrima Jatta (footballer, born 2002), Gambian football midfielder for Dukagjini
- Ebrima Tunkara (born 2010), Spanish football midfielder for Barcelona
- Ebrima Mballow (died 2023), Gambian banker, diplomat, and politician
