= Ebrima (typeface) =

Typeface for African writing systems

Ebrima is an OpenType font designed to support African writing systems. It was created by Microsoft and is part of the Windows 7 operating system. It supports advanced OpenType features such as combining diacritics positioning. Its Latin alphabet is based on the Segoe font.

== Writing systems ==
- Adlam script (𞤀𞤣𞤤𞤥)
- Greek script (partial) for the International Phonetic Alphabet
- Latin script with extensions for the African reference alphabet and the International Phonetic Alphabet
- N'Ko script (ߒߞߏ)
- Osmanya script (𐒋𐒘𐒈𐒑𐒛𐒒𐒕𐒀)
- Tifinagh (ⵜⵉⴼⵉⵏⴰⵖ)
- Vai script (ꕙꔤ ꕺꗏ)

== See also ==
- Ebrima Font Family (2012). Microsoft Typography
