= Tom Adlam =

English recipient of the Victoria Cross

Tom Edwin Adlam
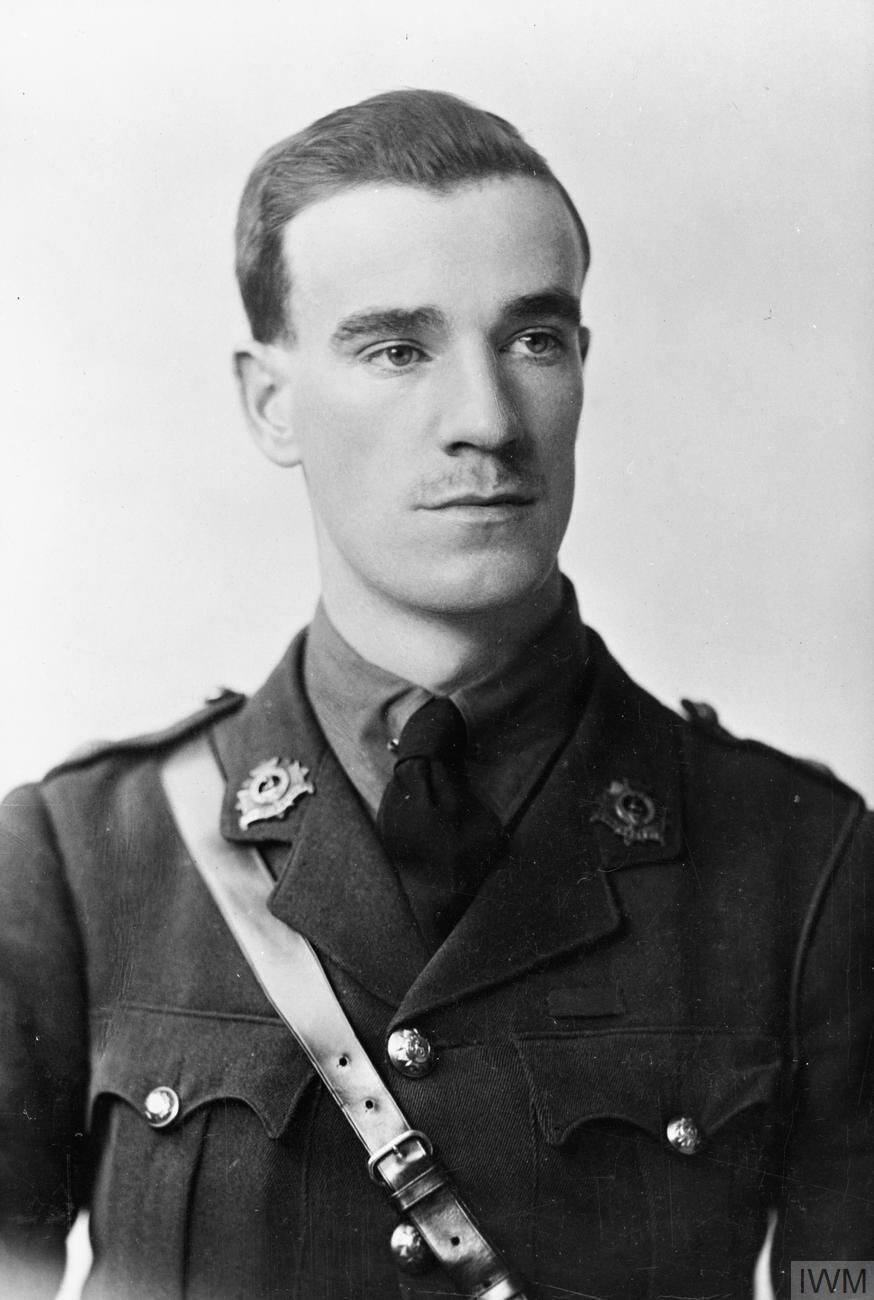
- Born: 21 October 1893; Salisbury, Wiltshire, England
- Died: 28 May 1975 (aged 81); Hayling Island, Hampshire, England
- Burial place: St Matthew's Churchyard, Blackmoor
- Military career
- Allegiance: United Kingdom
- Branch: British Army
- Service years: 1912–1945
- Rank: Lieutenant-Colonel
- Units: 7th Battalion, The Bedfordshire Regiment; Royal Engineers
- Conflicts: World War I: Western Front; Battle of the Somme; Battle of Thiepval Ridge (WIA); World War II
- Awards: Victoria Cross; Silver Medal of Military Valor (Italy)
- Other work: Teacher

Lieutenant-Colonel Tom Edwin Adlam, VC (21 October 1893 – 28 May 1975) was an English recipient of the Victoria Cross, the highest and most prestigious award for gallantry in the face of the enemy that can be awarded to British and Commonwealth forces. A soldier with The Bedfordshire Regiment during the First World War, he was awarded the Victoria Cross for his actions on 27 September 1916, during the Battle of the Somme. He later served in the Second World War.

Adlam was twenty two years old, and a temporary second lieutenant in the 7th Battalion, The Bedfordshire Regiment, British Army during the First World War when the following deed took place on 27 September 1916 at Thiepval, France, for which he was awarded the Victoria Cross.

A portion of a village which had defied capture on the previous day had to be captured at all costs to permit subsequent operations to develop. This minor operation came under very heavy machine gun and rifle fire. Second Lieutenant Adlam realising that time was all important, rushed from shell hole to shell hole under heavy fire collecting men for a sudden rush, and for this purpose also collected many enemy grenades. At this stage he was wounded in the leg, but nevertheless he was able to outthrow the enemy and then seizing his opportunity, and in spite of his wound, he led a rush, captured the position and killed the occupants. Throughout the day he continued to lead his men in bombing attacks. On the following day he again displayed courage of the highest order, and though again wounded and unable to throw bombs, he continued to lead his men. His magnificent example and valour, coupled with the skilful handling of the situation, produced far-reaching results.

Major-General (later Lieutenant-General, Sir) Ivor Maxse, commanding 18th (Eastern) Division later wrote that Adlam's bravery and example and also his skilful handling of his unit was ‘chiefly responsible for the success of the two companies of the Bedfordshire regiment, who cleared and made good the last bit of the Thiepval objective ...It was, in fact, a successful minor operation without which the main attack on Schwaben Redoubt could not take place’.

When interviewed in 1973, Adlam declared: ‘Some officers would think that they had to do better than their own men. But if I found a man who could do something better than me I’d say ‘Well do that’. And I think they like it ... A man likes to be recognised as being a responsible person.’ Simkins would argue that this was an example of initiative being delegated down from division to the man on the spot, as early as the Somme battles.

In civilian life, Adlam was a teacher at Brook Street School in Basingstoke and a member of the National Union of Teachers.

Adlam served in the Second World War with the Royal Engineers (Movement Control Section), and achieved the rank of lieutenant colonel.

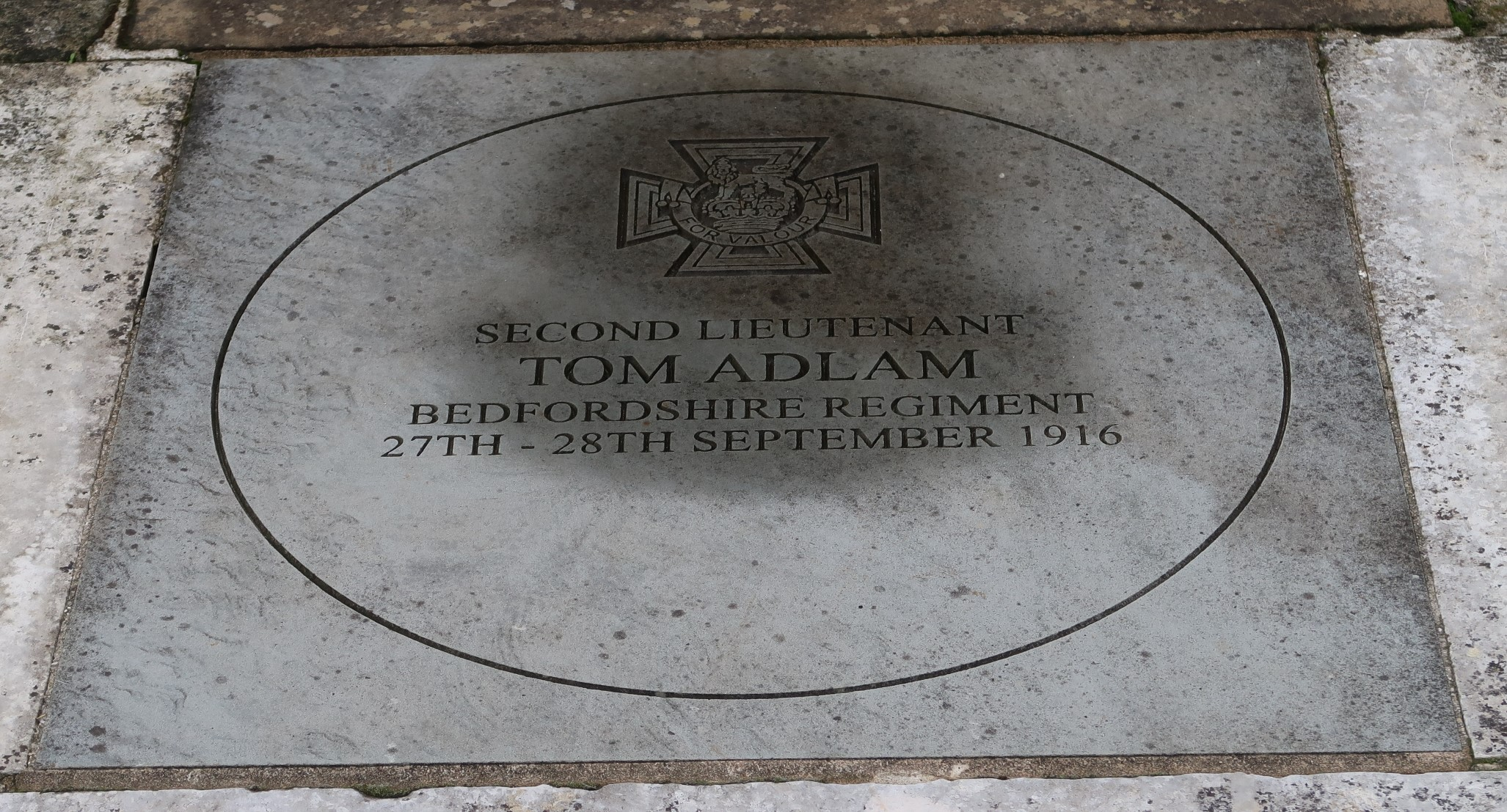
Engraved stone memorial as part of the War Memorial in front of Salisbury Guildhall

His Victoria Cross is displayed at Salisbury Guild Hall.

Adlam's voice was used in Peter Jackson's World War I film, They Shall Not Grow Old.
