= Adlam script =

Script used to write the Fula language

Adlam Pular 𞤀𞤣𞤤𞤢𞤥 𞤆𞤵𞤤𞤢𞤪
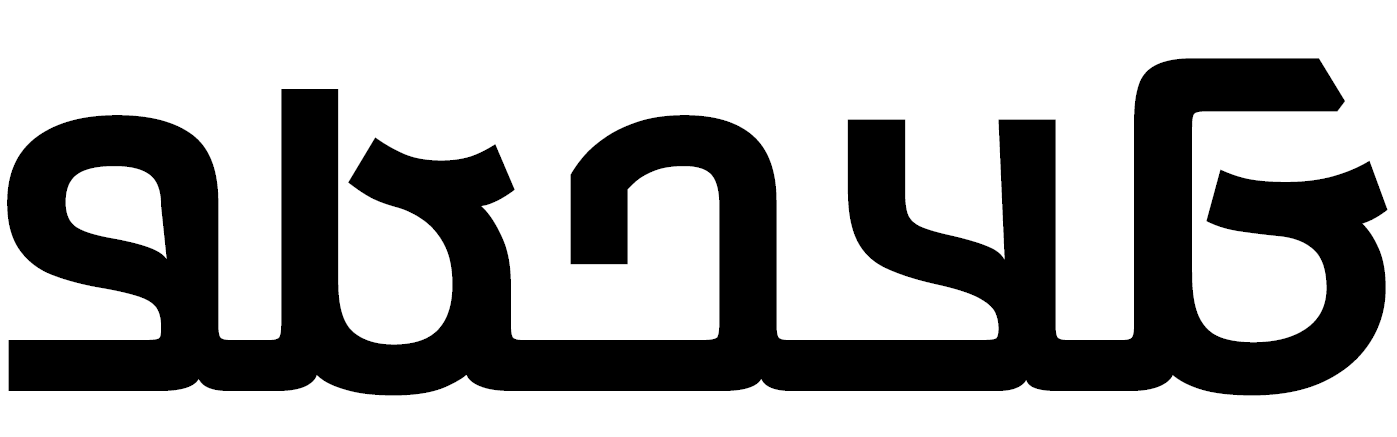
- "Adlam" written in Adlam script
- Script type: Alphabet
- Creator: Ibrahima Barry and Abdoulaye Barry
- Period: 1989–present
- Direction: Right-to-left script
- Languages: Fula

ISO 15924
- ISO 15924: Adlm (166), Adlam

Unicode
- Unicode alias: Adlam
- Unicode range: U+1E900–U+1E95F

The Adlam script is a script used to write Fulani. The name Adlam is an acronym derived from the first four letters of the alphabet (A, D, L, M), standing for Alkule Dandayɗe Leñol Mulugol (𞤀𞤤𞤳𞤵𞤤𞤫 𞤁𞤢𞤲𞤣𞤢𞤴𞤯𞤫 𞤂𞤫𞤻𞤮𞤤 𞤃𞤵𞤤𞤵𞤺𞤮𞤤), which means "the alphabet that protects the peoples from vanishing". It is one of many indigenous scripts developed for specific languages in West Africa.

Adlam is supported in Google's Android and Chrome operating systems. There are also Android apps to send SMS in Adlam and to learn the alphabet. On computers running Microsoft Windows, the Adlam script received native support beginning with Windows 10 version 1903, which was released in May 2019. On macOS, the Adlam script received support beginning with Ventura in 2022.

== Development ==
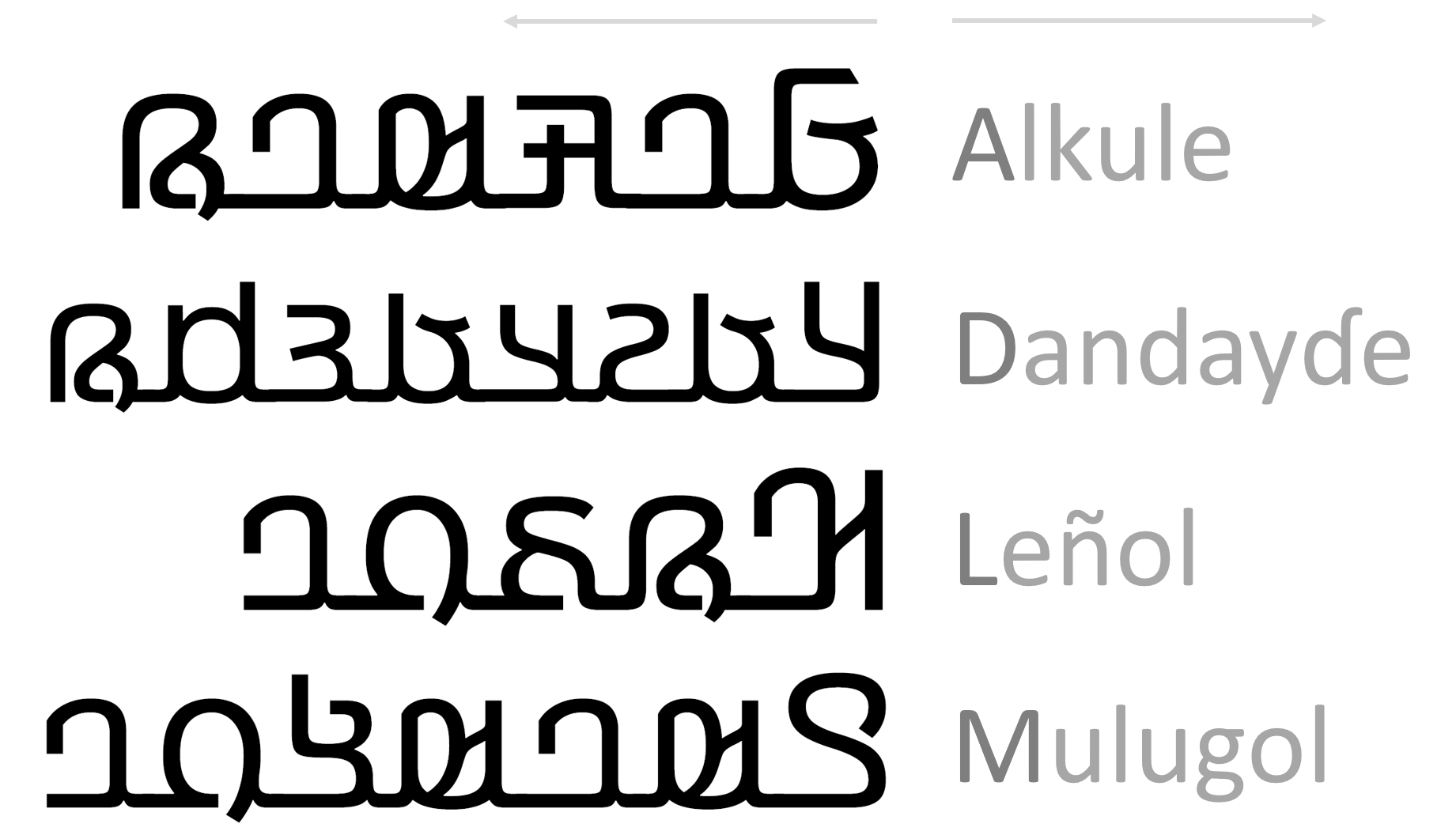
ADLaM acronym

While they were teenagers in the late 1980s, brothers Ibrahima and Abdoulaye Barry devised the alphabetic script to transcribe the Fulani language. One method they used involved them closing their eyes and drawing lines. After looking at their drawn shapes, they would pick which ones would look the most to them like a good glyph for a letter, and associate it with whatever sound they felt it would represent. Another method involved is thinking of a sound, imagining the look of a glyph for that sound, and drawing said glyph. After several years of development it began to be widely adopted among Fulani communities, and is currently taught not only regionally in Guinea, Nigeria, and Liberia but even as far as Europe and North America. In 2019, the character shapes were refined after practical usage.

== Letters ==
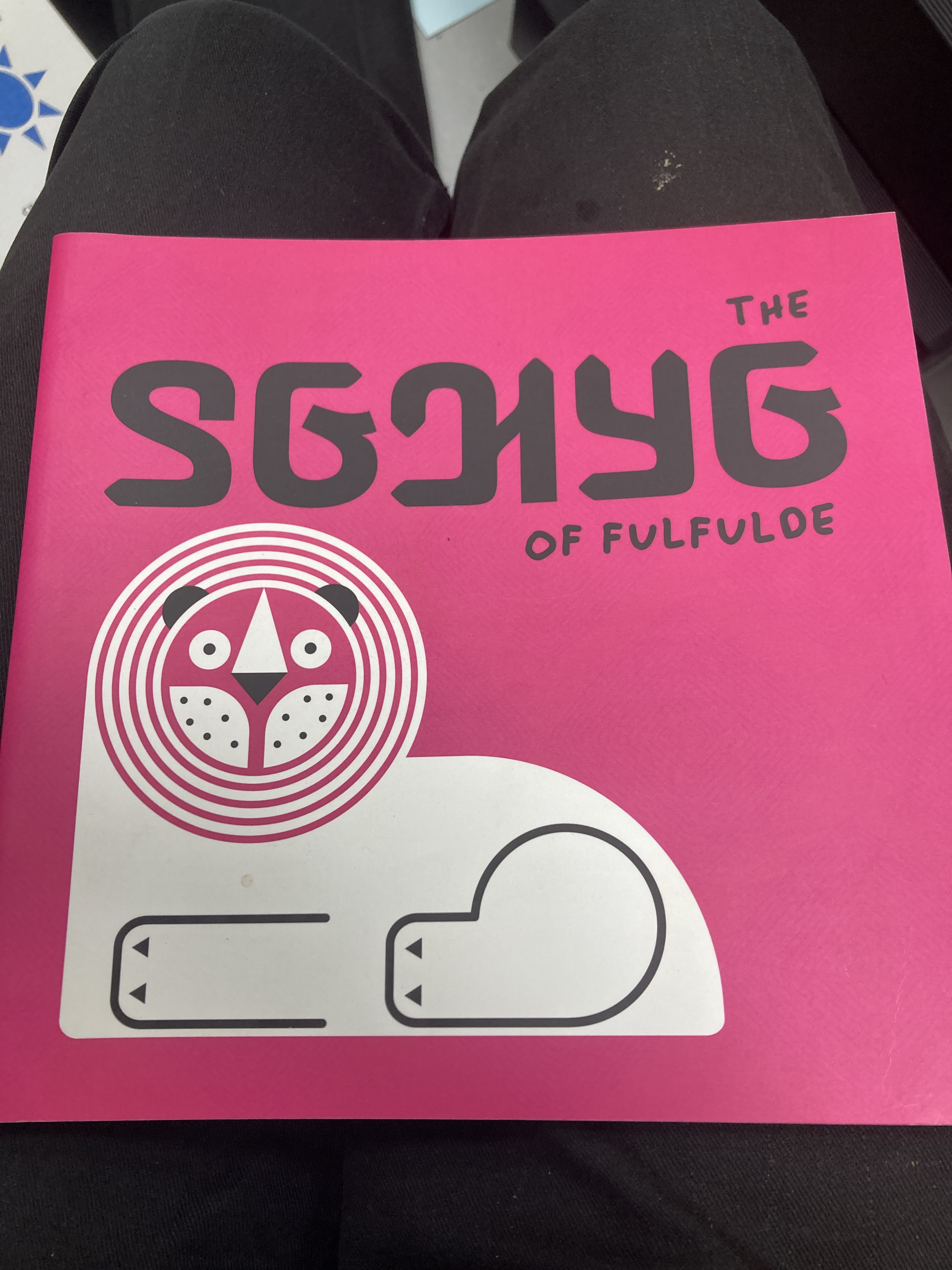
The Adlam of Fulfulde book

Adlam has both upper and lower cases.

They are written from right to left.

Capital	Minuscule	Latin	Arabic	Letter name	IPA
𞤀	𞤢	a	عَ / اَ / ا	a	/a/
𞤁	𞤣	d	د	da	/d/
𞤂	𞤤	l	ل	la	/l/
𞤃	𞤥	m	م	ma	/m/
𞤄	𞤦	b	ب	ba	/b/
𞤅	𞤧	s	س	sa	/s/
𞤆	𞤨	p	ݒ	pa	/p/
𞤇	𞤩	ɓ (bh)	ࢠ	bha	/ɓ/
𞤈	𞤪	r	ر	ra	/r/ or /ɾ/
𞤉	𞤫	e	عٜ / اࣹ	è	/e/
𞤊	𞤬	f	ڢ	fa	/f/
𞤋	𞤭	i	عِ / اِ	i	/i/
𞤌	𞤮	o	عࣾ / اࣷ	ö	/ɔ/
𞤍	𞤯	ɗ (dh)	ط	dha	/ɗ/
𞤎	𞤰	ƴ (yh)	ڃ	yha	/ˀj/ or /jˤ/
𞤏	𞤱	w	و	wâ	/w/
𞤐	𞤲	n, any syllable-final nasal	ن	na	/n/
𞤑	𞤳	k	ک	ka	/k/
𞤒	𞤴	y	ي	ya	/j/
𞤓	𞤵	u	عُ / اࣷ	ou	/u/
𞤔	𞤶	j	ج	dja	/dʒ/
𞤕	𞤷	c	ݖ	tcha	/tʃ/
𞤖	𞤸	h	ه	ha	/h/
𞤗	𞤹	ɠ (q)	ق	gha	/q/
𞤘	𞤺	g	گ	ga	/ɡ/
𞤙	𞤻	ñ (ny)	ݧ	gna	/ɲ/
𞤚	𞤼	t	ت	ta	/t/
𞤛	𞤽	ŋ (nh)	ݝ	nha	/ŋ/
Supplemental: for other languages or for loanwords
𞤜	𞤾	v		va	/v/
𞤝	𞤿	x (kh)	خ	kha	/x/
𞤞	𞥀	ɡb	گب	gbe	/ɡ͡b/
𞤟	𞥁	z	ز	zal	/z/
𞤠	𞥂	kp	کݒ	kpo	/k͡p/
𞤡	𞥃	sh	ش	sha	/ʃ/

The letters are found either joined (akin to Arabic) or separate. The joined form is commonly used in a cursive manner; however, separate or block forms are also used as primarily for educational content.

== Diacritics ==
Adlam has a number of diacritics. The 'consonant' modifier is used to derive additional consonants, mostly from Arabic, similar to e.g. s > š in Latin script.

Diacritic	Description
◌𞥄	long 'ā'; may be placed over the letter 'a', in which case 'ā' simply takes a different diacritic than other vowels do, or over a consonant, in which case the alif letter is not written at all
◌𞥅	long vowel (vowels except alif)
◌𞥆	long consonant (gemination)
◌𞥇	glottal stop, hamza (between the consonant it is placed over and the following vowel)
◌𞥈	consonant modifier (see the table below)
◌𞥉	long modified consonant
◌𞥊	dot (see the tables below)
𞥋	Used between n and another consonant to indicate that they constitute a prenasalized consonant

Usage of the consonant modifier:

Adlam letter with modifier	Corresponding Arabic letter
𞤧𞥈	ص
𞤣𞥈	ض
𞤼𞥈	ط
𞤶𞥈	ظ
𞤢𞥈	ع
𞤺𞥈	غ
𞤸𞥈	ح

Usage of the dot to represent sounds borrowed from Arabic:

Adlam letter with dot	Corresponding Arabic letter
𞤧𞥊	ث
𞤶𞥊	ز

Use of the dot with native letters:

Adlam letter with dot	Pronunciation
𞤫𞥊	e, as opposed to è or ɛ; dot above
𞤫𞥊𞥅	long e; dot below and vowel lengthener above
𞤮𞥊	o, as opposed to ɔ
𞤮𞥊𞥅	long o, dot below and vowel lengthener above

== Digits ==
Unlike the Arabic script, Adlam digits go in the same direction (right to left) as letters, as in the N'Ko script.

Adlam	Hindu-Arabic
𞥐	0
𞥑	1
𞥒	2
𞥓	3
𞥔	4
𞥕	5
𞥖	6
𞥗	7
𞥘	8
𞥙	9

== Punctuation ==
Adlam punctuation is like Spanish in that there are initial and final forms of the question mark and exclamation mark, which are placed before and after the questioned or exclaimed clause or phrase. The final forms are taken from the Arabic script. The shape of the initial marks changed in 2019 as part of the efforts for Unicode standardization.

Adlam	Latin
.	.
⹁	,
:	:
⁏	;
𞥟 … ؟	¿ … ?
! … 𞥞	¡ … !

The hyphen is used for word breaks, and there are both parentheses and double parentheses.

== Unicode ==
The Adlam alphabet was added to the Unicode Standard in June 2016 with the release of version 9.0. The Unicode block for Adlam is U+1E900–U+1E95F:

Adlam^{[1]}^{[2]} Official Unicode Consortium code chart (PDF)
	0	1	2	3	4	5	6	7	8	9	A	B	C	D	E	F
U+1E90x	𞤀	𞤁	𞤂	𞤃	𞤄	𞤅	𞤆	𞤇	𞤈	𞤉	𞤊	𞤋	𞤌	𞤍	𞤎	𞤏
U+1E91x	𞤐	𞤑	𞤒	𞤓	𞤔	𞤕	𞤖	𞤗	𞤘	𞤙	𞤚	𞤛	𞤜	𞤝	𞤞	𞤟
U+1E92x	𞤠	𞤡	𞤢	𞤣	𞤤	𞤥	𞤦	𞤧	𞤨	𞤩	𞤪	𞤫	𞤬	𞤭	𞤮	𞤯
U+1E93x	𞤰	𞤱	𞤲	𞤳	𞤴	𞤵	𞤶	𞤷	𞤸	𞤹	𞤺	𞤻	𞤼	𞤽	𞤾	𞤿
U+1E94x	𞥀	𞥁	𞥂	𞥃	𞥄	𞥅	𞥆	𞥇	𞥈	𞥉	𞥊	𞥋				
U+1E95x	𞥐	𞥑	𞥒	𞥓	𞥔	𞥕	𞥖	𞥗	𞥘	𞥙					𞥞	𞥟
Notes 1.As of Unicode version 17.0 2.Grey areas indicate non-assigned code points
