= Stoke Brook =

River in Gloucestershire, England

Coordinates: 51.538°N 2.538°W

Stoke Brook is a small brook in South Gloucestershire, England. A tributary of the River Frome, Bristol, it connects with Hortham Brook and Bradley Brook at Three Brooks Lake, which is part of the Three Books Nature Reserve.

It gives its name to the settlements of Stoke Gifford, Harry Stoke, Little Stoke, Great Stoke, Stoke Lodge and Bradley Stoke. The area around the brook was built up greatly during the 20th Century, as the villages of Stoke Gifford and the surrounding area met the northern edge of Bristol. Hence the number of villages and estates bearing the name.
