= Great Stoke =

Suburb of Bristol, Gloucestershire, England

Coordinates: 51.5194°N 2.534°W

- Location within Gloucestershire
- Civil parish: Stoke Gifford
- District: South Gloucestershire
- Shire county: Gloucestershire
- Region: South West
- Country: England
- Sovereign state: United Kingdom

Great Stoke is a suburb of the city of Bristol, in the South Gloucestershire district, in the county of Gloucestershire, England. It is part of the town of Bradley Stoke and lies within Stoke Gifford civil parish.

The 1882 Ordnance Survey map shows Knightwood Farm and a small number of houses at Great Stoke, around a road junction a short distance north-east of Stoke Gifford village.
