= Abbeywood Community School =

Location
- New Road; Stoke Gifford; Gloucestershire, BS34 8SF; England; 51.5134°N 2.5538°W

Information
- Type: Academy
- Trust: The Olympus Academy Trust
- Department for Education URN: 139067 Tables
- Ofsted: Reports
- Headteacher: Ben Dilley
- Gender: Mixed
- Age: 11 to 18
- Enrolment: 881
- Capacity: 1,214
- Houses: Athena, Apollo, Hera, Zeus
- Website: http://www.abbeywoodschool.com/

Abbeywood Community School is a mixed secondary school located in the Stoke Gifford area of South Gloucestershire, England. Abbeywood Community School opened in 2010, replacing Filton High School, which previously occupied the site. Abbeywood’s governing body is the Olympus Academy Trust.

== Overview ==
Abbeywood Community School was judged to be 'good' in all areas by Ofsted in 2018 and again in 2019. Abbeywood has been oversubscribed since 2015 and consequently is being expanded to accommodate 240 students in each year group. The school is part of the Olympus Academy Trust (which includes 9 schools locally.) Admissions are coordinated by South Gloucestershire Council.

== Facilities ==
Abbeywood benefits from facilities including sporting and leisure facilities, including flood-lit all–weather outside pitches, sports hall, a music recording studio, tennis and basketball courts, dance studio and access to Pro-5 football pitches. Secure WiFi access is available throughout the building, alongside teaching spaces for all subjects, including Science, Music, Art, Catering and Product Design.

=== BTE Academy ===
Bristol Technology and Engineering Academy (BTE Academy) was formally merged with the neighbouring Abbeywood Community School in September 2022, with Abbeywood occupying the former BTE Academy buildings. Engineering T-Levels are now accessible with access to an engineering Center.

== Qualifications ==
Abbeywood Community School offers GCSEs and L2 BTECs as programmes of study for pupils, while students in the sixth form have the option to study from a range of A-levels and L3 BTECs.

Abbeywood offers GCSEs in:

- Art, Music, Business, Health & Social Care, Computing, Triple Science, Product Design, French, Spanish, Textiles, History and Geography.

English literature, English language, combined science and mathematics are all mandatory.

Abbeywood offers A-levels in:

- Art, Biology, Chemistry, English Language, English Literature, Film Studies, French, Geography, History, Maths, Photography, Physics, Product Design, Psychology, Sociology, Spanish and Textiles.

Abbeywood offers T-levels in:

- Engineering (BTE Academy)

Level 3 BTEC/Cambridge Technical Programmes in:

- Business, Criminology, Engineering, Food & Nutrition, Health & Social Care, Computing, Media, Music Performance, Music Technology and Sport.

Abbeywood’s Enrichment Courses:

- Core Maths (half an A Level), Extended Project (half an A Level), Debating/Bar Mock Trial, First Aid, Sign Language, GCSE English Language Retake, GCSE Maths Retake, Duke of Edinburgh, PSHE, Team Sports and Volunteering.

Students are offered other qualifications at varied Post-16 Centres across other schools in the Olympus Academy Trust.

== Academic Achievement ==
Abbeywood’s academic achievement can be found on the government website.

=== Progress 8 ===
This score shows how much progress pupils made between the end of key stage 2 and the end of key stage 4, compared to pupils across England who got similar results at the end of key stage 2. This is based on results in up to 8 qualifications, which include English, maths and 3 English Baccalaureate qualifications. Abbeywood’s Progress 8 score is -0.44. The average score for all state-funded schools in England is -0.03.

=== Entering EBacc ===
An EBacc is an English Baccalaureate. A pupil is considered to have entered for the English Baccalaureate if they entered for qualifications in English, maths, sciences, a language and either history or geography. Abbeywood’s EBacc count is 18%. The average in England is 39%. The local authority average is 33%.

=== Grade 5 or above in English & maths GCSEs ===
This tells you the percentage of pupils who achieved grade 5 or above in English and maths GCSEs. GCSEs are graded 1 (low) to 9 (high). Grade 5 in the new grading is a similar level of achievement to a high grade C or low grade B in the old grading. In Abbeywood, the percentage of students achieving a 5+ is 48%; the English average is 50%. The local authority average is 48%.

=== Staying in education or entering employment ===
This shows the number of pupils who either stayed in education or went into employment after finishing key stage 4; this is for pupils who finished year 11 two years before the year of publication. For example, the 2022 table shows pupils who finished year 11 in 2020, which is the most recent data currently available. This figure covers any sustained education or employment destination. Abbeywood’s percentage of students staying in education or entering employment is 96%. The average in England is 94%; the local authority average is 95%.

=== Attainment 8 score ===
The attainment 8 score is based on how well pupils have performed in up to 8 qualifications, which includes English, maths and 3 English Baccalaureate qualifications. Abbeywood’s attainment 8 score is 44.9, the local authority average is 47.7, the average in England is 48.8.

== See also ==
- The Olympus Academy Trust
- Bradley Stoke Community School
