= Bristol Technology and Engineering Academy =

Location
- New Road; Stoke Gifford, Bristol, BS34 8SF; England; 51°30′46″N 2°33′22″W

Information
- Type: University Technical College
- Established: 2013
- Closed: 2022
- Department for Education URN: 139669 Tables
- Ofsted: Reports
- Principal: Rhian Priest
- Age: 14 to 19
- Website: http://www.bteacademy.co.uk/

Bristol Technology and Engineering Academy (or BTE Academy) was a University Technical College (UTC) that opened in September 2013 in Stoke Gifford, just north of Bristol, England. The University of the West of England and City of Bristol College were the lead academic sponsors of the UTC, and Airbus and GKN were the lead business sponsors of the UTC.

== History ==
BTE Academy had an its first intake of students aged 14 and 16 (academic years 10 and 12) in 2013. The primary catchment area of the UTC is Bristol and areas of South Gloucestershire and Bath and North East Somerset.

BTE Academy specialised in engineering and environmental technologies. Pupils aged 14 to 16 studied GCSEs and additional technical core subjects which included a BTEC First Certificate in Engineering and a BTEC First Award in ICT, as well as additional GCSEs in Environmental Science and Business Communication. Sixth form students studied A Level Maths and a BTEC National Certificate in Environmental Sustainability, as well as options of other A Levels with BTEC Diplomas or Extended Diplomas in Engineering.

By the Ofsted inspection of 2015 where they assessed the school to be good, school was 30% empty, with only 333 spaces filled and only 105 in the sixth-form.

After the UTC had been open seven years. the numbers on roll has fallen to 230. Ofsted visited and declared that the school required improvement in every category. It was constrained by its structure and many of the pupils were sent here after they had failed elsewhere. The 2018 Ofsted report included the following assessment:

Pupils do not achieve as well as they should in key stage 4, because the quality of teaching is too inconsistent. Pupils' standards of literacy are low and too many are inarticulate. Pupils do not achieve as well as they should. Teachers do not differentiate the pupils of different abilities: some pupils find work too easy, while others get set tasks that are too difficult for them. Leaders have not been able to retain staff, as a result, pupils' progress is halted in some subjects. The Governors' focus is not on raising the quality of teaching and pupils’achievement. In the sixth form students do not finish the courses that they start on. Attendance in the sixth form is not acceptable preventing progress. The school is small.The leadership team is small and some are inexperienced. Too many pupils do not have positive attitudes to learning. They take little pride in their work and disrupt the learning of others, especially when the quality of teaching is weaker.

The UTC was formally merged with the neighbouring Abbeywood Community School in September 2022, with Abbeywood occupying the former BTE Academy buildings.
