= The Olympus Academy Trust =

British charity

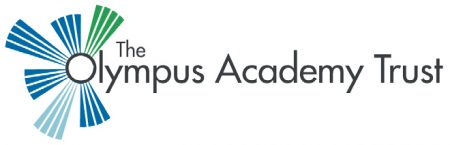
- The Olympus Academy Trust is a multi-academy trust
- Founded: 2012
- Founder: Dave Baker
- Type: The Olympus Academy Trust is registered as a British charity and a private company, limited by guarantee with no share capital.
- Purpose: The Trust aims to look after business and non-education functions so that schools can focus on learner outcomes and the well-being of their school community.
- Location: Bradley Stoke Community School, Bradley Stoke, South Gloucestershire, UK (Registered office)
- Region served: South Gloucestershire
- Method: Education partnerships, resources, staff, financial grants
- Revenue: ▲
- Employees: 800+
- Website: http://www.olympusacademiestrust.org.uk

The Olympus Academy Trust is a multi-academy trust in South Gloucestershire that was founded in 2012. Situated within the districts of Bradley Stoke, Filton, Patchway and surrounding areas, the trust currently comprises nine schools: one all-through, three secondary and five primary academies.

The trust is responsible and accountable for the education of just under 7000 students between the ages of 3 and 19 and for the employment and support of over 800 staff. The trust is a charitable company run on a non-profit basis.

== History ==
In January 2013 the trust commenced sponsorship of Abbeywood Community School, a local secondary school placed in Special Measures. The school was subsequently judged to be 'GOOD' in all areas in a 2015 Ofsted inspection, and judged to have no change to their previous 'GOOD' rating in 2018.

In January 2015 Meadowbrook and Charborough Road primaries joined the trust, followed by Callicroft, Filton Hill, and Stoke Lodge primary schools in September 2016; Callicroft and Stoke Lodge having previously been overseen by the Cosmos Academy Trust. Bradley Stoke secondary became an all-through school with its own primary phase in September 2015.

In August 2025 the founder and chief executive of the trust, Dave Baker, died unexpectedly.

=== Schools Joining the Partnership ===
- Jan 2012 - Bradley Stoke Community School
- Jan 2013 - Abbeywood Community School
- Jan 2015 - Meadowbrook and Charborough Road Primary Schools
- Sep 2016 - Stoke Lodge, Filton Hill and Callicroft Primary Schools
- Sep 2017 - Patchway Community School
- Feb 2018 - Winterbourne Academy

=== Origin ===
The name Olympus originates from the Olympus Concorde engine. This is significant because it was designed and produced locally.

== Governance ==
The trust is governed by a board of trustees that is responsible for holding the chief executive to account. Trustees consist of a mixture of parents, community members and experts who are appointed based on their skills, insight and knowledge. They work on a voluntary basis.

The chair of the board of trustees is Sarah Williams. The most recent chief executive of the trust was Dave Baker, until his death in August 2025.

== Schools and Academies ==
The Olympus Academy Trust (OAT) is a partnership of schools, currently comprising nine South Gloucestershire schools; one all-through, three secondary and five primary academies.

All-through Schools:

- Bradley Stoke Community School

Primary Schools:

- Charborough Road Primary
- Callicroft Primary Academy (previously Callicroft Primary School)
- Filton Hill Primary
- Meadowbrook Primary School
- Stoke Lodge Primary School

Secondary Schools:

- Abbeywood Community School
- Patchway Community School (previously Patchway Community College)
- Winterbourne Academy (previously TRFWIA, as a part of the Ridings Federation)
