= Over, Gloucestershire =

Over, Gloucestershire could refer to:

- Over, Tewkesbury
- Over, South Gloucestershire
