= Stoke Lodge =

Suburb of Bristol, England

Coordinates: 51.533778°N 2.564534°W

- Location within Gloucestershire
- OS grid reference: ST609818
- Unitary authority: South Gloucestershire
- Ceremonial county: Gloucestershire
- Region: South West
- Country: England
- Sovereign state: United Kingdom
- Post town: BRISTOL
- Postcode district: BS34
- Dialling code: 01454
- Police: Avon and Somerset
- Fire: Avon
- Ambulance: South Western
- UK Parliament: Filton and Bradley Stoke

Stoke Lodge is a suburb of Bristol, England, developed in the 1950s and early 1960s on farmland to the south of Patchway Common, South Gloucestershire and east of the A38 trunk road. Although the busy London to South Wales railway forms the south-western boundary of the estate, the sound of the trains is moderated by the railway tracks being within a cutting. The new town of Bradley Stoke lies immediately to the east, whilst the suburb of Little Stoke is on its southern edge.

Stoke Lodge housing is mostly chalet bungalows, but there is a fairly large bungalow estate in the north. Stoke Lodge takes its name from the old lodge house on Stoke Lane, an access road that runs through the estate. Part of the original walled lodge served for many years as a local dairy. There is a primary school, and adult learning centre.

An interchange on the A38 allows traffic from Cribbs Causeway, Patchway, etc. to cross the trunk road freely and gain access to the estate. There is, however, no direct road link between Stoke Lodge and Bradley Stoke. Traffic can also enter Stoke Lodge from Little Stoke via Stoke Lane or Station Road.

Although geographically separated from the more heavily populated Patchway Estate, Stoke Lodge is part of the Patchway postal district. Until recently Stoke Lodge was also part of Patchway town. However, on 1 April 2015 the area became part of the new parish of Stoke Lodge and The Common (originally known as Patchway Common).
