= Three Brooks =

Park in Bradley Stoke, United Kingdom

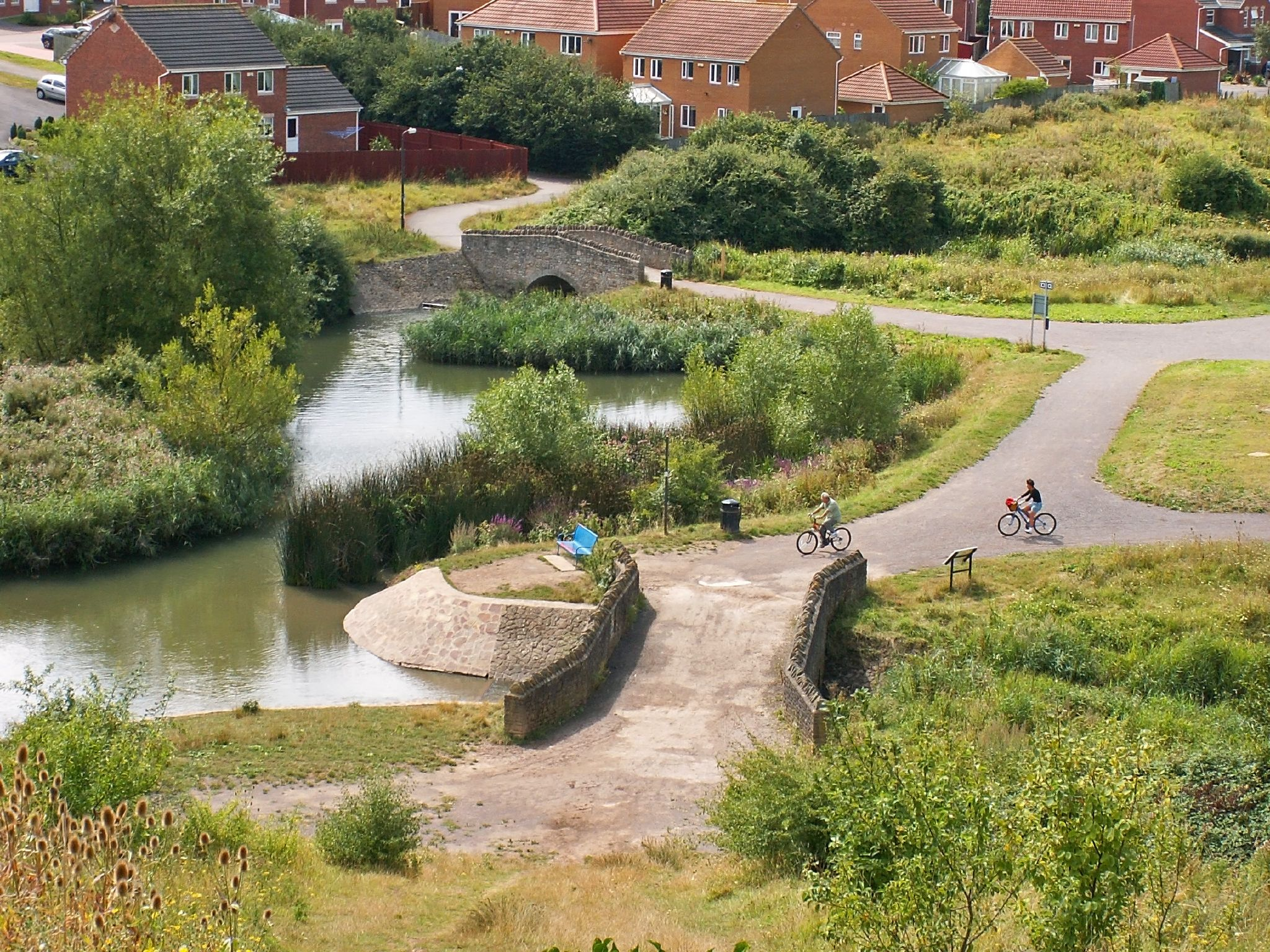
- Three Brooks Lake, a man-made lake and nature reserve between Bradley Stoke and the M4 motorway
- Interactive map of Three Brooks
- Location: Bradley Stoke, South Gloucestershire
- OS grid: ST625820
- Coordinates: 51.5293°N 2.5456°W
- Area: 60 hectares (150 acres)
- Status: Local nature reserve

The Three Brooks is a local nature reserve of approximately 44 hectares (110 acres) in Bradley Stoke, South Gloucestershire, England. It is named after the Hortham, Patchway, and Stoke Brooks which run through it, meeting at Three Brooks Lake before flowing eastwards back under the M4 motorway as Bradley Brook.

The town of Bradley Stoke was built in the 1980s on low-grade farmland, and a number of natural features such as Savage's Wood, Webb's Wood, and Sherbourne's Brake were incorporated into the town to form the Three Brooks local nature reserve. This tranquil area in the middle of the busy community of Bradley Stoke is made up of the three previously named bluebell woods, linked by an important wildlife corridor that includes brooks, ponds, areas of rough grassland, species-rich hedgerows, and a lake. The Lake is now part of the Frome Valley Relief Sewer.

The site is owned by the South Gloucestershire Council.

== History ==
The woods on the nature reserve were used predominantly as sources of timber, although the original Sherbourne's Brake copse may have been used as a covert. Webb's Wood particularly supplied coppiced timber and Savage's hornbeam and oak. Savage's Wood was preserved during the 1940s and '50s as a nature reserve by the owner of Little Stoke Farm, Howard Davis, who, as the largest local farmer, owned the land up to and including the wood. Davis was also one of the founders of the Wildfowl Trust at Slimbridge.

In the same area, Bradley Stoke Way cut a swathe through Savage's Wood when built, leaving a small remnant of the wood on the far side of the road next to Tesco's car park. Much of the ash plantations nearby were planted in reparation for this disruption of the wood.

== Habitats ==
| Location | Habitat | Species Found |
|---|---|---|
| Webb's Wood | Woodland | Oak, Ash, Hawthorn, Hazel with typical woodland flora and fauna |
| Savage's Wood | Woodland | Oak, Ash, Hawthorn, Hazel with typical woodland flora and fauna |
| Sherbourne's Brake | Woodland | Oak, Ash, Hawthorn, Hazel with typical woodland flora and fauna |
| The Tump | Open scrub | Grass with shrubs and skylarks present |
| Three Brooks Lake | Water | Wildfowl and aquatic invertebrates |
| Community Orchard | Fruit Trees | Wild Flowers |

The Three Brooks local nature reserve comprises three bluebell woodlands; Webb's Wood, Savages's Wood, and Sherbourne's Brake. New trees have been planted with funds from the Woodland Grant Scheme to help develop the Forest of Avon in South Gloucestershire.

The rmix of habitats provides a home that assists a wide range of wildlife, including reed buntings, skylarks, great crested newts, and slowworms.

The Three Brooks Lake attracts ducks throughout the year and has provided breeding sites for little grebes, reed warblers, sedge warblers, and mute swans.

The feature known as the tump is new, made up mainly of spill from the Second Severn Crossing. It provides a habitat for skylarks and other birds which are thought to have bred there.

The community orchard was planted with various fruit trees, bushes, and wild flowers to provide pollen and nectar for insects within the reserve as well as to provide natural resources for the local community, such as fruit.

== Conservation ==
The nature reserve is cared for by local residents who have set up a conservation group, the Three Brooks Nature Conservation Group, that is open to the public and meets on the first Saturday of each month to help manage the reserve. The group organises a range of events and practical workdays to help raise awareness of the nature reserve and to enhance its biodiversity. These range from bat walks to traditional woodland management like coppicing and ditch-clearing. The Conservation Volunteers have a 'green gym' at the nature reserve.

== Wildlife ==
In 2014 a 30 hour Bio Blitz was held and 617 species were identified on the reserve.

- Birds: the reserve is home to reed buntings, skylarks, and during the breeding season, you might spot little grebes, reed warblers, and sedge warblers. The Three Brooks Lake is a hotspot for ducks throughout the year and has also been a breeding site for mute swans
- Amphibians: great crested newts find a safe haven here, thriving in the pond areas
- Reptiles: slow worms
- Moths: 140 different species
- Bats

== Access ==
There are several main access points into the reserve, all with well-surfaced paths. The sign-posted network of cycle paths goes throughout the reserve for people to view the many different habitats. In 2019 over 500m of woodland paths at the northern end of the reserve in Savages and Primrose woods were upgraded. These paths link into existing surfaced paths creating circular walks. The stone dust path improvements used an environmentally friendly no-dig, cell web specification, to provide all year round accessibility, which in turn reduced the trampling impact on ground flora and will also protect the adjacent woodland tree roots from compaction. Behind the Leisure Centre a disabled gate was installed to give those using mobility scooters greater access to Savages Wood. The gate is open to walkers but a Radar key is required to open it fully. In 2020 further path improvements were made to paths between Savages Wood and Bowsland meadow.

== See also ==
- Bradley Stoke Community School

== Bibliography ==
- Landscape of the Past: the hidden heritage of Bradley Stoke, Sharon Ubank, 1998, printed by Cromwell Press, Trowbridge, Wiltshire
- The Farmer and the Goose with the Golden Eyes, Martin Davis, 2009, published by Redcliffe Press, Bristol ISBN 978-1-906593-37-7
