= Northavon District Council elections =

Local government elections in Avon, England

Northavon was a non-metropolitan district in Avon, England. It was abolished on 1 April 1996 and replaced by South Gloucestershire.

== Political control ==
From the first election to the council in 1973 until its abolition in 1996, political control of the council was held by the following parties:

Party in control	Years
Conservative	1973–1991
No overall control	1991–1996

== Council elections ==
- 1973 Northavon District Council election
- 1976 Northavon District Council election (New ward boundaries)
- 1979 Northavon District Council election
- 1983 Northavon District Council election
- 1987 Northavon District Council election
- 1991 Northavon District Council election (District boundary changes took place but the number of seats remained the same)
