= Claire Hazelgrove =

Member of Parliament for Filton and Bradley Stoke

Claire Hazelgrove MP
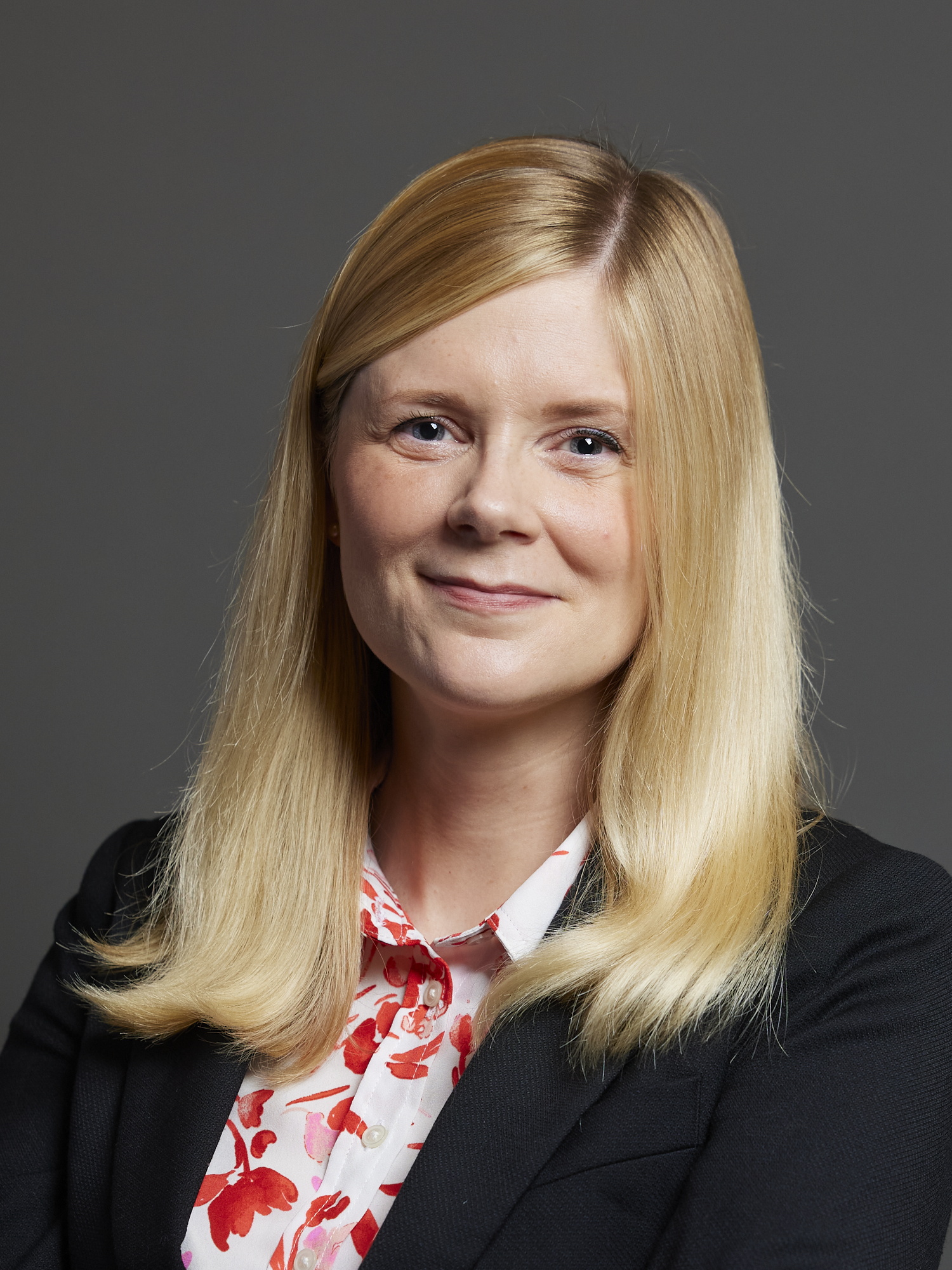
- Official portrait, 2024

Member of Parliament for Filton and Bradley Stoke
- Incumbent
- Assumed office 4 July 2024
- Preceded by: Jack Lopresti
- Majority: 10,000 (19.9%)

Personal details
- Born: Claire Ruth Hazelgrove; 16 July 1988 (age 38)
- Party: Labour
- Education: University of York; University of Bath
- Website: clairehazelgrove.co.uk

Claire Ruth Hazelgrove (born 16 July 1988) is a British Labour Party politician who has served as the Member of Parliament for Filton and Bradley Stoke since the 2024 general election. Between September 2025 and July 2026, she served as Parliamentary Private Secretary (PPS) to Chief Secretary to the Prime Minister Darren Jones.

== Early life ==
Hazelgrove was born in Northampton, England, on 16 July 1988. She attended Campion School, her local comprehensive, before reading Politics at the University of York.

She became involved in politics through the Make Poverty History campaign in 2005. While studying at York, she volunteered for Labour MP Sally Keeble, whom she later cited as an influence on her decision to stand for Parliament.

== Early career ==
Aged 19, Hazelgrove was selected as the Labour parliamentary candidate for Skipton and Ripon in 2007 while studying at the University of York.

She subsequently worked in organising and campaigning in both the United Kingdom and the United States, including on Barack Obama’s 2008 and 2012 presidential campaigns and at Labour Party headquarters, where she ran the party’s social media efforts 2010-2011.

She later held organising, campaigning and political engagement roles at a national level with Shelter, the ONE Campaign and Friends of the Earth. At the ONE Campaign, she worked in London, Washington, D.C. and Seattle on volunteer engagement and political advocacy in support of international development.

During the 2016 United Kingdom European Union membership referendum, Hazelgrove served as Deputy Director of UK Field Operations for the official campaign supporting continued membership of the European Union.

She subsequently worked at the Tony Blair Institute for Global Change before joining TPXimpact, where she led work with local government, public sector and third sector organisations on engaging members of the public in shaping public services and policy.

During this period she also completed a Master of Science degree in Public Policy at the University of Bath alongside her work.

In November 2022, Hazelgrove, a Bristol resident, was selected as Labour’s parliamentary candidate for Filton and Bradley Stoke.

Parliament of the United Kingdom
Preceded by Jack Lopresti	Member of Parliament for Filton and Bradley Stoke; 2024–incumbent	Incumbent
