= Jack Lopresti =

British politician and soldier (born 1969)

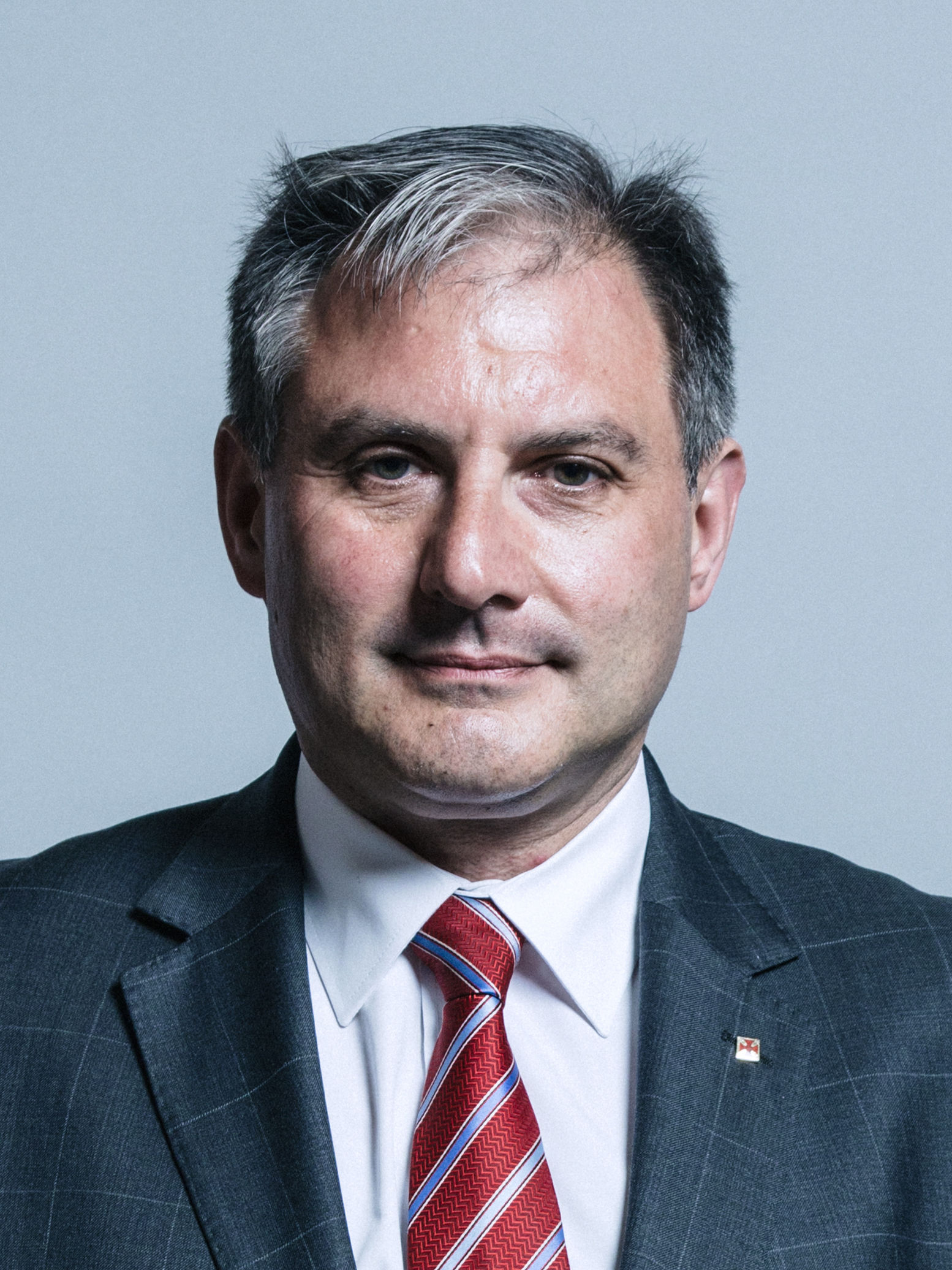
- Official portrait, 2017

Member of Parliament for Filton and Bradley Stoke
- In office 6 May 2010 – 30 May 2024
- Preceded by: Constituency established
- Succeeded by: Claire Hazelgrove

Member of Bristol City Council for Stockwood
- In office 6 May 1999 – 3 May 2007
- Preceded by: Colin Williams
- Succeeded by: Jay Jethwa

Personal details
- Born: Giacomo Lopresti; 23 August 1969 (age 57) Southmead, Bristol, England
- Party: Conservative
- Spouses: Lucy Cope (m. 1993; div. 2016); Andrea Jenkyns (m. 2017; div. 2023)
- Children: 4

Military service
- Allegiance: United Kingdom; Ukraine
- Branch/service: British Army Reserve; Ukrainian Ground Forces
- Years of service: 2007–present 2024–present
- Rank: Corporal
- Unit: Royal Artillery; Royal Wessex Yeomanry; Azov Brigade (2026)
- Battles/wars: War in Afghanistan, Russo-Ukrainian war

Giacomo "Jack" Lopresti (born 23 August 1969) is a British Conservative politician who was the Member of Parliament (MP) for Filton and Bradley Stoke from 2010 to 2024. Lopresti was appointed Deputy Chairman of the Conservative Party in February 2023.

== Early life and career ==
Lopresti was born on 23 August 1969 in Southmead in Bristol. After leaving school, Lopresti worked in his father's ice cream business for over ten years. A former estate agent and mortgage broker, he worked for the Conservative Party as a Regional Development Officer and in the Conservative Party Treasurer's Department.

Lopresti served in the Territorial Army as a gunner with 266 Commando Battery, Royal Artillery from 2007. He served, as a mobilised reservist, with 29 Commando RA for a year and was deployed in Helmand Province, in Afghanistan, on Operation Herrick 9 for five months over Christmas and New Year 2008/9. While in Afghanistan, Lopresti ran the Camp Bastion Half Marathon, for Help for Heroes, on New Years Day 2009. From 2011 to 2013, Lopresti served as a trooper in the Royal Wessex Yeomanry, an army reserve cavalry unit.

== Political career ==
Lopresti unsuccessfully stood as the Conservative candidate in the Bedminster ward of Bristol City Council in 1995. He was again unsuccessful when he stood in Hartcliffe ward in 1997 and Redland ward in 1998, but was subsequently elected in the Stockwood Ward in 1999. He worked as councillor in that ward until May 2007, when he stood down and a new Conservative candidate won the seat.

He stood unsuccessfully as the Conservative Party candidate for the Bristol East constituency in 2001, and for the South West at the European Parliament elections in 2004. Although the Conservative Party did win three seats in the region, Lopresti was the sixth candidate for the seven seats that were available.

Lopresti was a member of the Conservative Party's A-List in 2006. At the 2010 general election, he was first elected as Member of Parliament (MP) for Filton and Bradley Stoke, a constituency newly created after boundary changes.

In 2011, he was a member of the special Select Committee set up to scrutinise the Bill that became the Armed Forces Act 2011. He also served on the Northern Ireland Affairs Committee

As of 2015, Lopresti was a member of the Conservative Friends of Israel group, and attended delegations of that group including during the Operation Defensive Shield conflict when he visited in 2014 for an Israeli military briefing on the Iron Dome air defence system.

At the 2015 general election, he retained his seat with an increased majority of almost 10,000 votes.

Lopresti supported Brexit in the 2016 EU referendum.

Lopresti was subject to a failed attempt before the 2017 general election by some members of his local party to deselect him as the Conservative Candidate for Filton and Bradley Stoke. This followed reports in the press that he had been having an extramarital affair with a fellow MP. There was, he said, a "vicious smear campaign" in the constituency and an "attempt to destroy my character and reputation" after revelations about his private life. Lopresti said he had made a complaint to the police over a letter urging Lopresti's deselection, which had been circulated by a "former very bitter party member and possibly a disgruntled employee", and appeared to have broken data protection laws. He was re-selected.

At the 2017 UK general election, he retained his seat, but with a decreased majority.

In Parliament, Lopresti served on the Northern Ireland Affairs Committee, Armed Forces Bill Committee and Defence Committee.

In December 2017, BBC News Online reported that Lopresti was facing an investigation after his ex-office manager made a formal complaint about his behaviour, following her resignation. A senior Conservative councillor in Bristol subsequently claimed there were "ample grounds" to believe the bullying allegations surrounding the MP due to his "character flaws" and past behaviour. However, two former staff members said they had had a good relationship with Lopresti, and that he was a good employer. Subsequent to this, the BBC reported on 11 July 2019 that the ex-office manager, Jo Kinsey, felt she had been 'vindicated' following her complaint, having received a letter of apology from Lopresti following an internal Conservative party investigation. Lopresti said he categorically rejected the allegations, and had concerns about the inquiry process.

In the December 2019 general election, Lopresti retained his seat once again, with a slightly greater majority than in 2017.

On 8 April 2020 during the coronavirus pandemic, Lopresti sent a letter to cabinet minister Robert Jenrick asking him to reopen churches for Easter.

Lopresti was appointed Deputy Chairman of the Conservative Party, serving alongside Nickie Aiken, Lee Anderson, Luke Hall and Matthew Vickers from 2023.

Lopresti lost his seat in parliament in the general election of 4 July 2024, gaining 12,905 votes compared to Labour's Claire Hazelgrove with 22,905.

== Post-parliamentary career ==
In November 2024, Lopresti started serving in the Ukrainian military, in the International Legion. He is based in Kyiv, working on foreign relations and diplomacy, weapons procurement, and liaising with charities operating in Ukraine. In February 2026, Lopresti announced that he had joined the Azov Brigade.

== Personal life ==
Lopresti, who is of Sicilian ancestry, is divorced from his former wife Lucy, the daughter of Lord Cope of Berkeley; they have three children.

Following his divorce from Lucy Cope, Lopresti married Andrea Jenkyns MP in St Mary Undercroft in the Palace of Westminster on 22 December 2017 and they have a son named Clifford George, born on 29 March 2017. Lopresti and Jenkyns divorced in 2023.

Lopresti was diagnosed with bowel cancer in 2013. He received treatment at the Bristol Royal Infirmary.

Parliament of the United Kingdom
New constituency	Member of Parliament for Filton and Bradley Stoke; 2010–2024	Succeeded by Claire Hazelgrove
