= City of Bristol College =

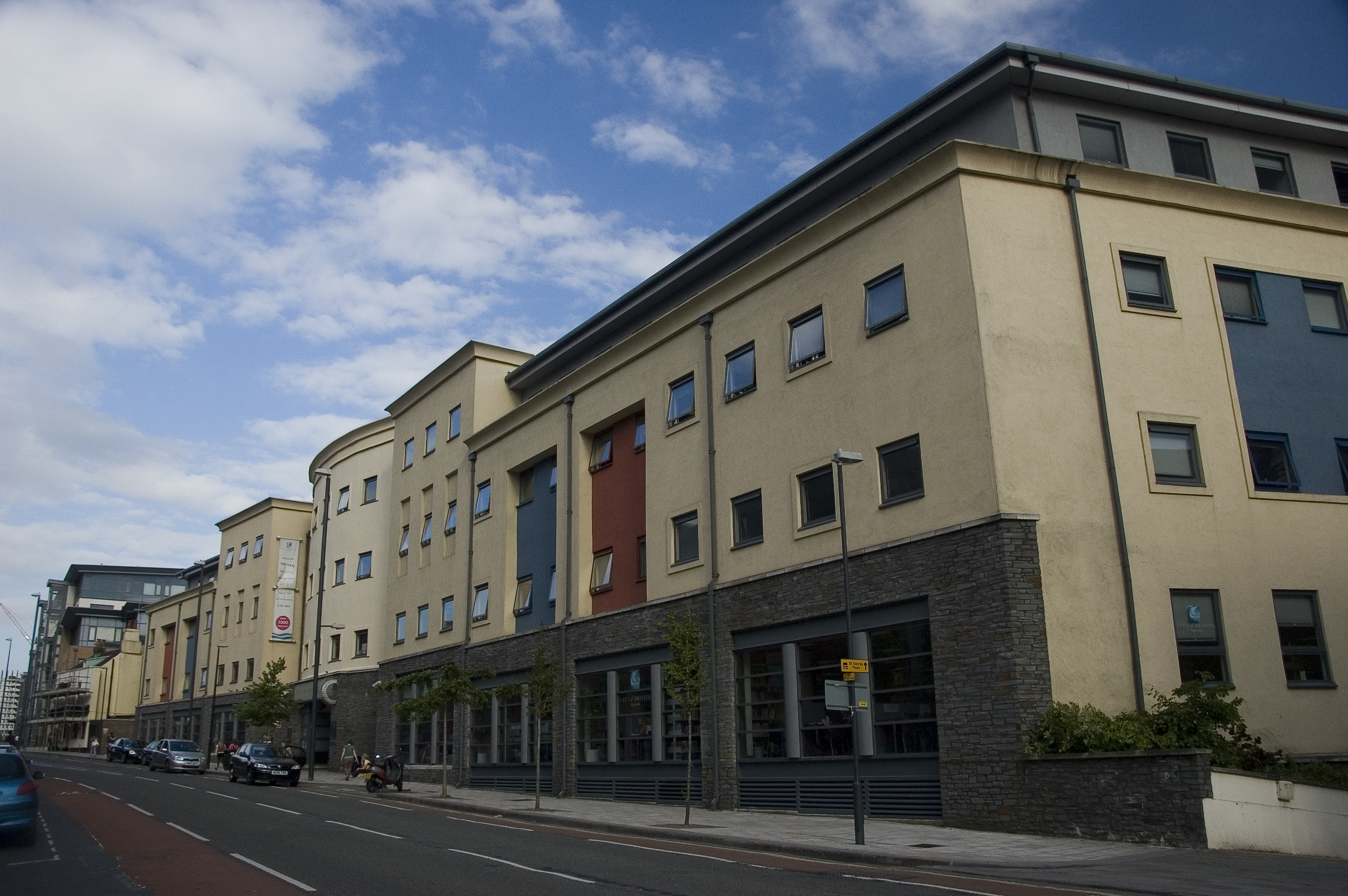
- College Green Centre

Location
- St George's Road; Bristol, BS1 5UA; England; 51.45091°N 2.60553°W

Information
- Type: Further education
- Established: 1996; 30 years ago
- Department for Education URN: 131094 Tables
- Ofsted: Reports
- Principal: Julia Gray
- Staff: 865
- Gender: Mixed
- Age: 16 to Adult
- Enrolment: 14,000+
- Website: www.cityofbristol.ac.uk

City of Bristol College is a further education and higher education college in Bristol, England.

It provides courses for young people and adults aged 16 and above in areas such as: A Levels, Animal Care, Floristry, Horticulture, Applied Forensic and Medical Science, Business, Catering and Hospitality, Computing, Construction, Creative and Performing Arts, Engineering and Manufacturing, ESOL and GCSEs, Hair, Beauty and Holistic Therapies, Health and Social Care and Childcare, Motor Vehicle and Transport, Public Services, Health and Fitness, Travel and Tourism and many more.

== History ==
City of Bristol College traces its roots back to the educational initiatives of the Society of Merchant Venturers in the sixteenth century.

The college was formed in 1996 when Brunel College merged with South Bristol College. It subsequently merged with smaller establishments such as the College of Care and Early Years Education in 2000 and Soundwell College in 2002.

In 2013 the college was awarded Ofsted's lowest rating, 'inadequate'; and the quality of teaching, learning and assessment were judged to be both inadequate and very inconsistent.

In 2015 the Soundwell centre was closed and some buildings on the Ashley Down Campus sold to developers.

In February 2016, a Whistleblower from the college told the Bristol Post that the college was to be rated inadequate as a result of its January Ofsted inspection. On 10 march, Ofsted confirmed that the college had dropped from its previous 'Requires improvement' grade to 'Inadequate' - the organisation's lowest rating.

In June 2017, the college was rated by Ofsted as requires improvement, with some elements of the college being good, like adult study programmes and provisions for learners with high needs.

Also in June 2017, the college was given a Silver Teaching Excellence Framework (TEF) award. This award judges the quality of teaching and the outcomes they achieve at higher education level, as well as taking into account student satisfaction, employment outcomes and retention rates.

As of January 2023, the latest Ofsted report rated the college 'Good' in all areas apart from Personal Development which 'Requires improvement.'

== College centres ==
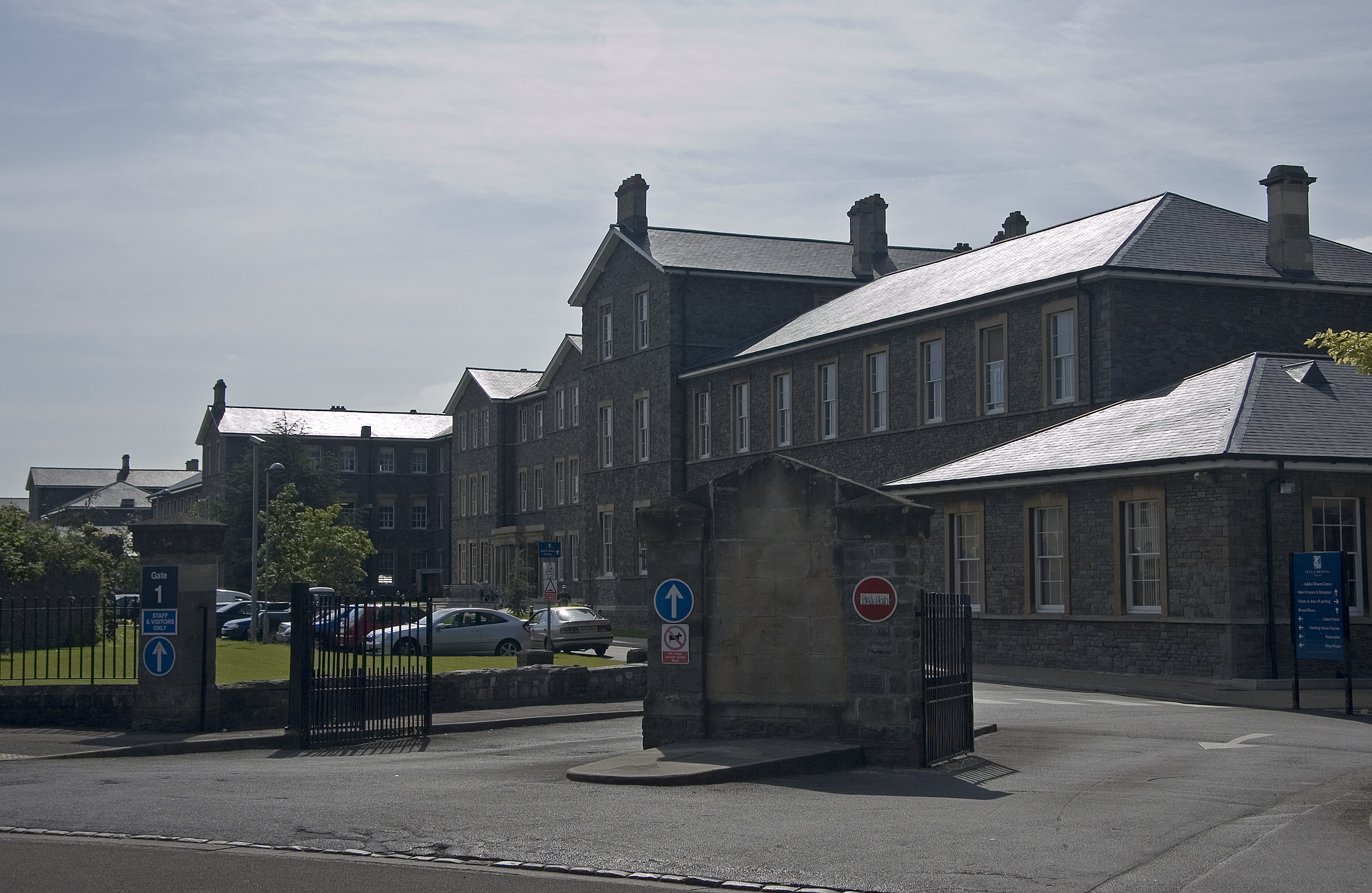
Ashley Down Centre.

The college currently has four centres:

- College Green Centre
- Ashley Down Centre
- South Bristol Skills Academy
- Parkway at Filton

Formerly, there was also a Soundwell centre; it closed in 2015.

Some of the buildings of the Ashley Down Centre were originally constructed, as the Muller Homes in the middle of the 19th century. In 1958 the buildings became Bristol College of Science and Technology. Muller Road, which runs near the site of the orphanage, is named after its founder. The site includes the college's university centre, classrooms and laboratories for a variety of courses.

The site was previously used long-term as the external film set for the BBC television series Casualty from 1986 until 2002 before relocating to Lawrence Hill Industrial Park. Permanent features were installed such as marked ambulance bays, a canopy roof, 'automatic' sliding front entrance doors (leading to a false corridor) and reversible 'Emergency Department' and hospital signage that could be covered when not filming. Occasionally, interior sets would be temporarily set up for example whenever a hospital managers office needed to be portrayed. All filming now takes place at a purpose-built set in Wales.

The College Green Centre includes the sixth form centre with around 400 students undertaking A-level courses and 1,200 on vocational courses. The Advanced Engineering Centre offers engineering, aeronautical, manufacturing and automotive courses. The South Bristol Skills Academy opened in 2010 close to Hengrove Leisure Centre and South Bristol Community Hospital.

The college has a range of partnership agreements with other educational facilities. For 13 years the foundation degree dance programmes were based at the Bristol Community Dance Centre. Diploma and degree courses have also been run at dBs Music. The Skills Centre South West also provides courses to help people get into work, foundation and key skills and English for speakers of other languages. The college has also been an academic sponsor of the Bristol Technology and Engineering Academy a University Technical College.

== Curriculum ==
City of Bristol College offers over 1,000 courses at all levels for school leavers, adult learners and international students, as well as training packages for employers.

Courses include Diplomas, A Levels, Apprenticeships and NVQs. University level courses include Foundation Degrees, HNCs and Access to HE in partnership with University of Plymouth, Bath Spa University, University of the West of England, University of Gloucestershire and University of Bristol.

== See also ==
- List of UCAS institutions
- List of universities in the United Kingdom
