= St Michael's Church, Stoke Gifford =

Church in Stoke Gifford, Bristol

Coordinates: 51.5149°N 2.5453°W

Church of Saint Michael
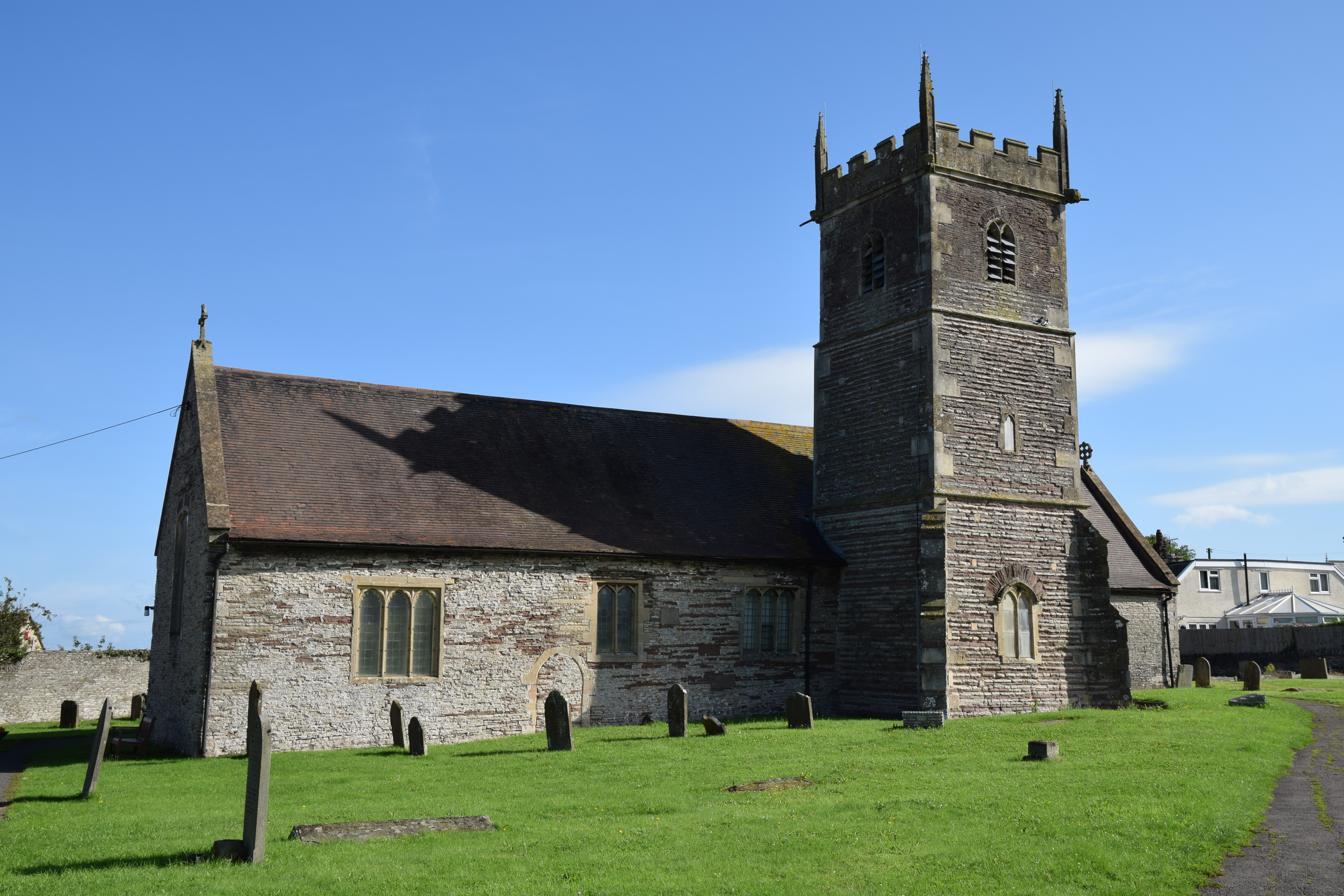
- The church of St Michael
- Location: Stoke Gifford, Bristol
- Country: England
- Denomination: Church of England

History
- Founded: before 1086

Administration
- Diocese: Diocese of Bristol

The Church of Saint Michael is a Church of England church located in Stoke Gifford, Bristol. It serves as the parish church of Stoke Gifford. Founded during the Anglo-Saxon period before 1086, the church is a Grade II* listed building.

== History ==
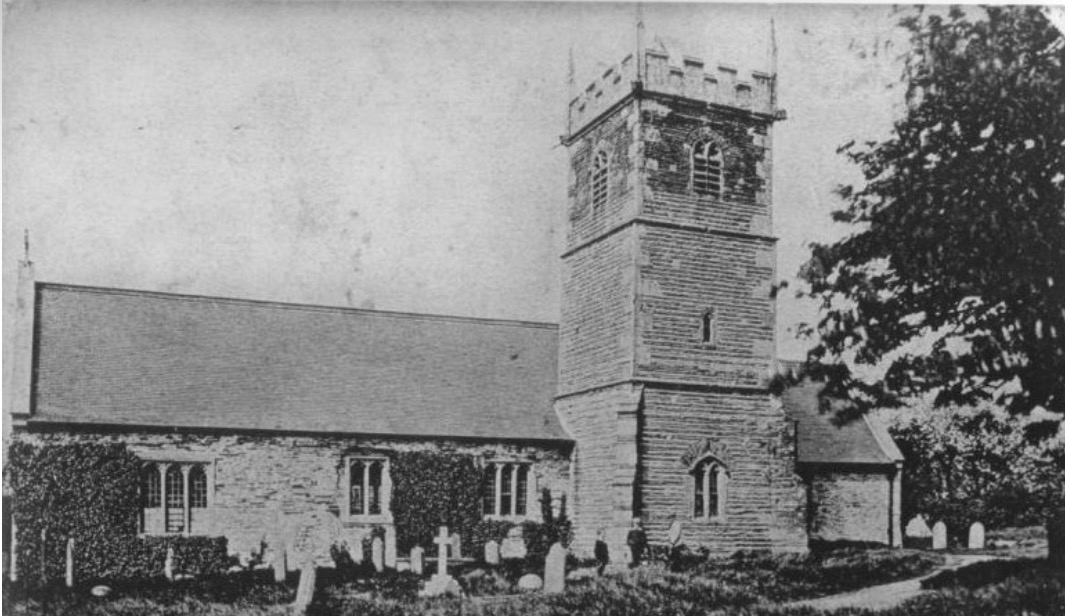
The church in the early 20th century

The Church of St Michael is believed to have Saxon origins and was first recorded before the Norman Conquest. The church is recorded in the Domesday Book of 1086, indicating it had been already established since before the 11th century. Archaeological discoveries of Roman coins within the parish suggest that the site has been occupied from at least the third century AD.

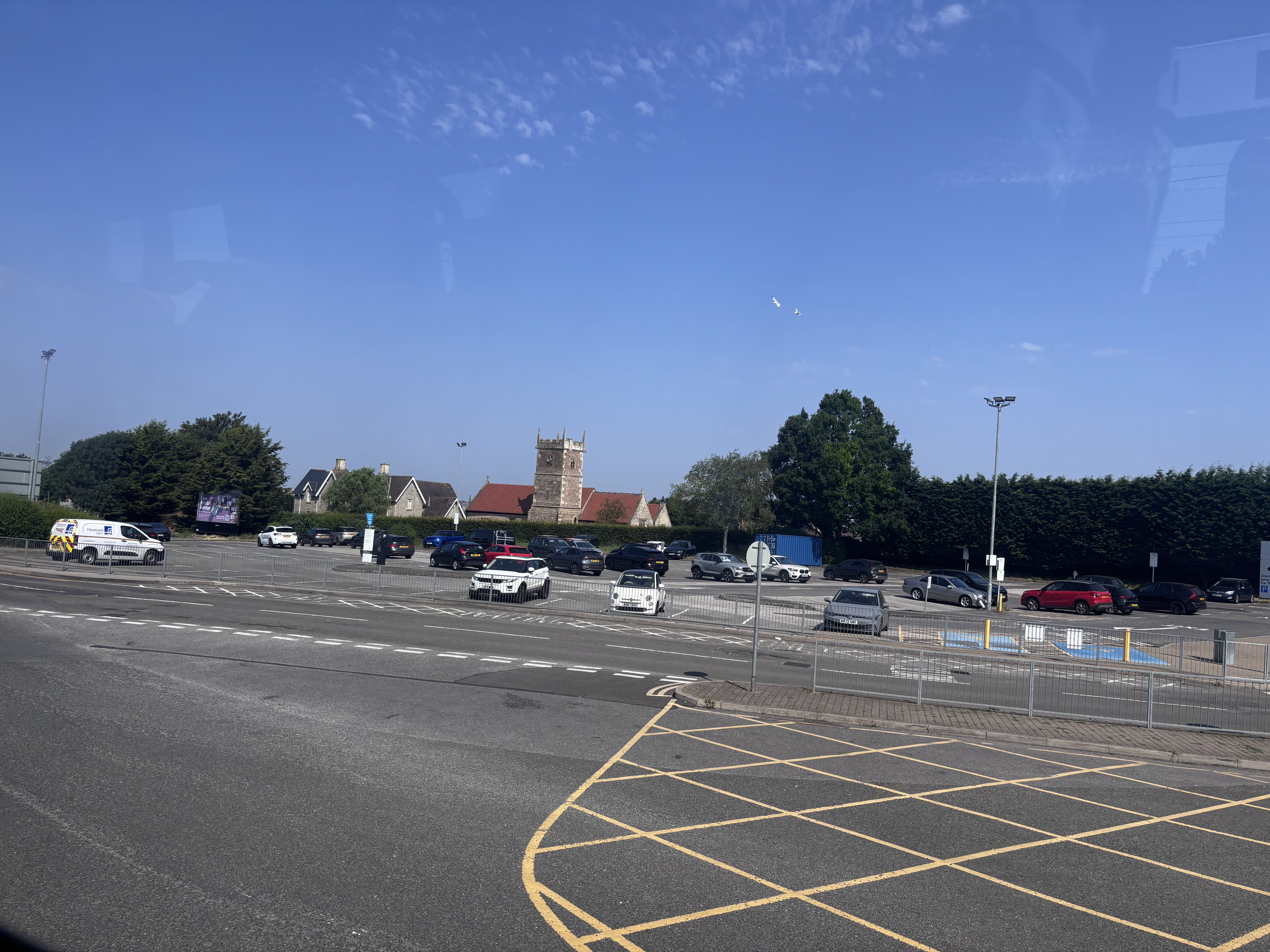
The church viewed from the adjacent Parkway Station in 2026

The current church was largely constructed during the 14th under the support and patronage of the Berkeley family, replacing an earlier medieval structure. A 12th century Norman font survives from the previous church. The church has served as the parish of Stoke Gifford since its founding. The church underwent alterations during the eighteenth century, including changes to several windows and internal fittings. Between 1894 and 1897 it was restored by the architect E. H. Lingen Barker, with several windows being replaced. During the 20th century the parish expanded considerably as residential development transformed Stoke Gifford from a rural village into a suburb of Bristol. In 1991 the parish established the Church of Christ the King at Bradley Stoke to serve the growing population while remaining part of the same parish.

== Architecture ==
The Church features predominantly 14th century architecture consisting of coursed rubble with freestone dressings and clay tile roofs. It was redecorated in the Decorated Gothic style with later eighteenth-century alterations and Victorian restoration work. The church comprises a three-bay nave, a chancel, and a three-stage south transept tower. The interior retains several historic fittings, including a 12th century Norman scalloped font. Owing to its architectural and historic significance, the church was designated a Grade II* listed building on 26 June 1984.
