= Winterbourne Academy =

Coordinates: 51.52473°N 2.50703°W

Location
- High Street; Winterbourne, South Gloucestershire; England

Information
- Type: Academy
- Established: 2018
- Trust: The Olympus Academy Trust
- Department for Education URN: 135944 Tables
- Ofsted: Reports
- Head teacher: Jenny Cartwright
- Gender: Mixed
- Age: 11 to 18
- Enrolment: 1,720+
- Website: winterbourneacademy.org.uk

The Winterbourne Academy, is a co-educational school in South Gloucestershire. The school is in the village of Winterbourne in South Gloucestershire, on the outskirts of Bristol, England.

== History ==
The Ridings High School was founded in 1957. It was opened by the then Member of Parliament for Bristol South East, Tony Benn.

In 2007, Rob Gibson (Headteacher at the time) was invited by the Department for Children, Schools and Families (DCSF) to consider a move to Academy status as the Lead (non-financial) sponsor in a hard federation, incorporating King Edmund Community School in Yate. As a result, in August 2009, The Ridings' Federation of Academies was established with two independent academies, Winterbourne International Academy (formerly 'The Ridings High School' and the lead sponsor) and Yate International Academy (formerly King Edmund Community School). The two academies have since parted ways, and now operate under separate trusts. Rob Gibson became the Chief Executive Principal in 2009 of the Federation but left at the end of 2014. Beverley Martin became Chief Executive Principal of the Federation in 2015 and Principal of Yate International Academy.

The Winterbourne Academy has approximately 1,720 students on roll including 370 in its sixth form. Winterbourne Academy used to base its curriculum models upon the International Baccalaureate Middle Years Programme. The Winterbourne International Academy delivered the International Baccalaureate Diploma (post-16) until 2016.

== Academic standards ==
The Academy has expanded since its inception, providing services such as a technology college, Arts Centre and Sixth Form.

Since 2006 it has offered the International Baccalaureate, becoming the first school in South Gloucestershire to offer this qualification, and even attracting students from abroad.

== New build ==
The school was granted £19.3 million to finance their new build. In January 2013, the new school opened at the end of 2014.

== Notable former pupils ==
- International rugby player, Dave Attwood
- Author, Nathan Filer
- Former Bristol Rovers goalkeeper, Mike Green
- Winter Olympic Bronze medallist, Jenny Jones
- Former football player and manager Gary Megson
- Mark Zanker, Red Arrows pilot from 1994–96 and RAF Harrier pilot, now a Boeing 747-400 (freight) pilot with Cathay Pacific since 1999
- Weatherman Alex Beresford
- England Cricketer, James Bracey
