= Yate Academy =

Location
- Sundridge Park; Yate, South Gloucestershire; England; 51.5366°N 2.4182°W

Information
- Type: Academy
- Established: 1953 (as King Edmund Community School), 2009 (as The Ridings Federation Yate International Academy), 2017 (as Yate Academy)
- Department for Education URN: 145135 Tables
- Ofsted: Reports
- Headteacher: Edward Rakshi
- Age: 11 to 18
- Enrolment: 1051
- Website: http://www.yateacademy.co.uk

Yate Academy (formerly King Edmund Community School) is a secondary school located in the town of Yate in South Gloucestershire, on the outskirts of Bristol, England. It was founded in 1953.

In 2007, Rob Gibson, the (former) headteacher of The Ridings High School was invited by the DCSF to consider a move to academy status as the Lead (non-financial) sponsor in a hard federation, incorporating King Edmund Community School in Yate. As a result, in September 2009, The Ridings Federation of Academies was established with two independent academies, Winterbourne International Academy (formerly 'The Ridings High School' and the lead sponsor) and Yate International Academy (formerly King Edmund Community School). Gibson became the Chief Executive Principal of the Federation and the Statutory Headteacher of both academies. This changed in 2015 when the academy introduced the new Chief Executive Principal Beverley Martin. In 2017 Yate International Academy left The Ridings’ Federation of Academies and joined the Greenshaw Learning Trust. The school is now known as Yate Academy, with Isabel Ambrose as Principal leading the school from January 2018 until 2020. In September 2021, Natalie Wilcox took over as Headteacher after a year as Associate Head teacher, working alongside Isabel Ambrose.

There are approximately 750+ students on roll including 100+ in the schools Sixth Form which is called Cotswold Edge Sixth Form which was introduced in 2015.

== Academy proposals ==
In the 2007–2008 school year, The Ridings High School was approached by the UK government to join its Pathfinder Programme and become the lead sponsor in a federation of academies with King Edmund Community School in Yate. As Lead Sponsor, The Ridings High School would take the lead role in the educational development, strategic leadership and direction of the other school.

The consultation period ended in February 2009, and the local council agreed that the two schools would close and reopen in August 2009 as academies. King Edmund then became The Ridings' Federation Yate International Academy. Roger Gilbert left as Academy Principal of Yate International Academy in February 2015. Beverley Martin came to the School as the Chief Executive Principal of The Ridings’ Federation of Academies, and Principal of Yate International Academy until she left on 20 October 2015. Isobel Ambrose is the Principal and is in charge of Yate International Academy. On 7 and 8 October 2015 Yate International Academy had an Ofsted Inspection.

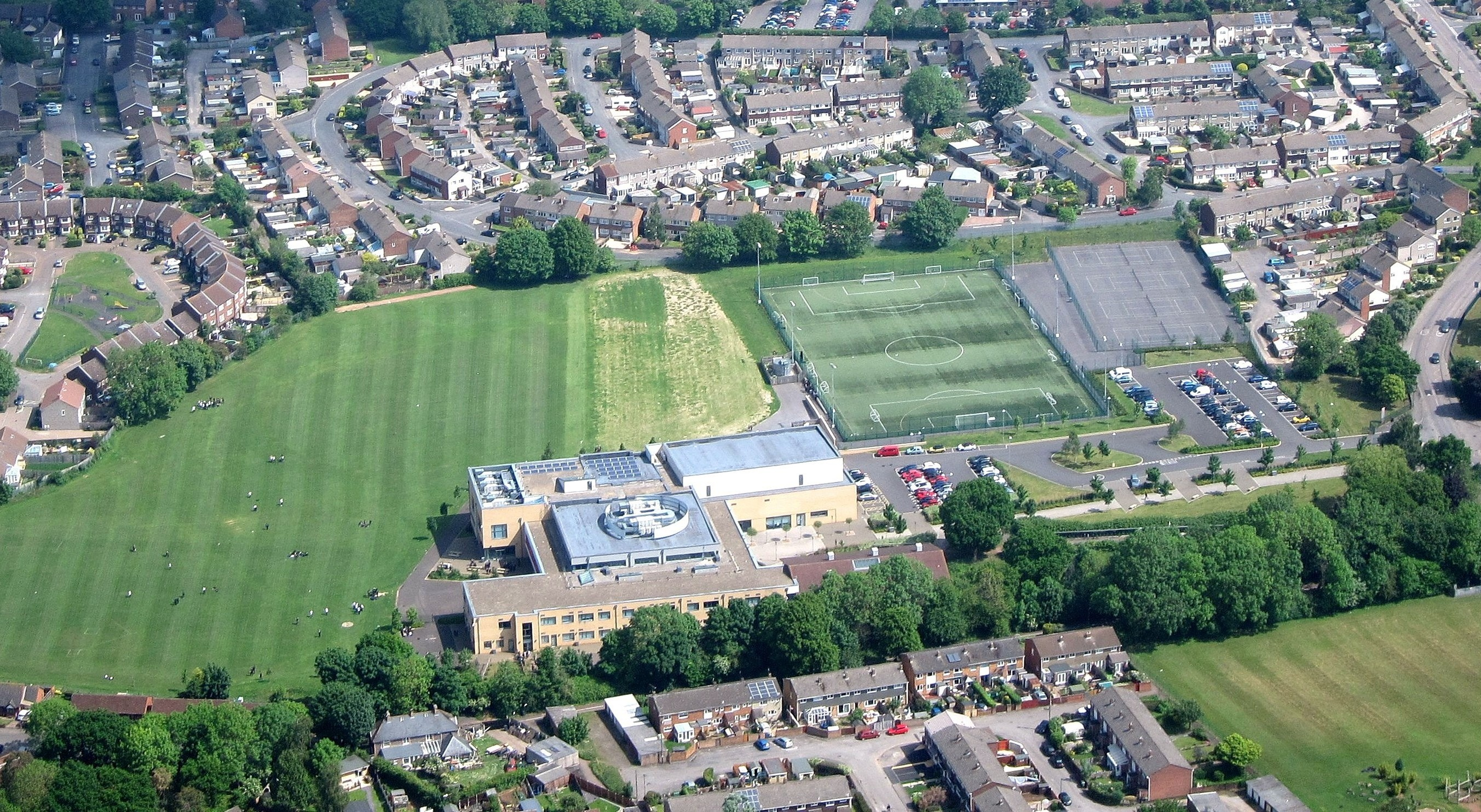
Yate Academy and its playing field (2017)

== New build ==
Yate Academy is the first 3-19 all-through Academy in South Gloucestershire. Since becoming an academy in 2009, £16 million has been invested in replacing the old buildings of King Edmund Community School.

It now has a 60-seat STEM theatre and a 240-seat auditorium, photography dark room, all-day canteen, fitness gym, large sports hall, dance studio, four tennis courts and a floodlit all-weather pitch.

== Cotswold Edge Sixth Form ==
Cotswold Edge Sixth Form is the collaboration of Yate Academy, Brimsham Green School and Chipping Sodbury School.

== Greenshaw Learning Trust ==
In 2017 Yate International Academy joined the Greenshaw Learning Trust changing the name officially to Yate Academy.
