= Dave Attwood =

English rugby union player

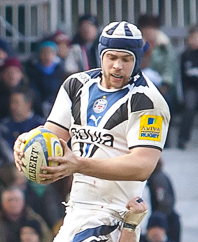
- Attwood in 2012
- Born: David Attwood; 5 April 1987 (age 39) Bristol, England
- Height: 2.03 m (6 ft 8 in)
- Weight: 120 kg (18 st 13 lb; 260 lb)
- School: The Ridings High School
- University: University of Bristol

Rugby union career
- Position: Lock
Youth career
- -: Dings Crusaders
Senior career
Years	Team	Apps	(Points)
2005–2009	Bristol	20	(5)
2009–2011	Gloucester	45	(10)
2011–2019	Bath	156	(55)
2018	→ Toulon	9	(0)
2019–2022	Bristol Bears	54	(15)
2022–2023	Bath	18	(0)
- Correct as of 27 June 2022
International career
Years	Team	Apps	(Points)
2007	England U20	5	(0)
2010–2011	England Saxons	2	(0)
2010–2018	England	24	(0)
- Correct as of 12 November 2016

Dave Attwood (born 5 April 1987) is an English former rugby union player who played as a Lock. In 2017 he was described as a "big traditional tight-head lock, a master of the set piece, indeed arguably the best scrummaging second row in the country". He has previously played for Bristol Bears, over two spells, Gloucester and Toulon.

== Education and early career ==
Attwood attended The Ridings High School in Bristol. He graduated from Bristol University with a joint Honours degree in Physics and Philosophy with the support of the Bristol Rugby Academy before moving on to the First Team squad. His rugby heroes include Alex Brown, Will Greenwood and coach and personal friend Phil Cue, his then coach at Bristol Minis and Juniors and Dings Crusaders. In 2007 aged 20, he was described as "the thinking man's Martin Johnson" (rugby union). He was England under 16 discus champion and still enjoys throwing although he complains that "he never finds the time."

== Club career ==
Attwood spent two years (2007–2009) with the Bristol Rugby first team squad. The 2008–09 season saw him feature more regularly in the first team, playing in the Anglo-Welsh Cup as well as the European Challenge Cup. He joined Gloucester in the summer of 2009. In February 2011, it was announced that he had agreed a two-year deal with Bath Rugby, from the beginning of the 2011–12 season.

In February 2019, it was announced that Attwood would be rejoining Bristol Bears at the start of the 2019–2020 season on a two-year deal

== International career ==
Attwood represented England under 19s in the 2006 Junior World Cup, scoring against New Zealand in the semi-final. He played for the England under 20 team in 2007.

He was called into the England Saxons squad to face Italy A on 9 February 2008, although he did not play in the match. He made his playing debut for the England Saxons against Ireland Wolfhounds in January 2010.

Attwood was called up to the senior England team for the 2010 Summer tour to Australia. He played two games with the second-string squad against the Australian Barbarians, but was cited at the end of the first game for stamping. This was dismissed on technicalities before being reviewed.

Attwood made his senior England debut as a replacement for Tom Palmer in the game against New Zealand on 7 November 2010. He made his third appearance for England against Argentina on 8 June 2013 in a 32–3 victory for England. He captained England Saxons to a 2–0 series win away to South Africa A in 2016.

As at January 2017, Attwood had won 24 England caps.

== Interests ==
Attwood funds a performance sports scholarship at the University of Bristol called the Dave Attwood Rugby Scholarship Scheme.

He has "donated and raised tens of thousands of pounds for research into degenerative brain disease" through his continued support for the School of Clinical Sciences at Bristol University.
