= Harry Stoke =

Coordinates: 51.5109°N 2.5456°W

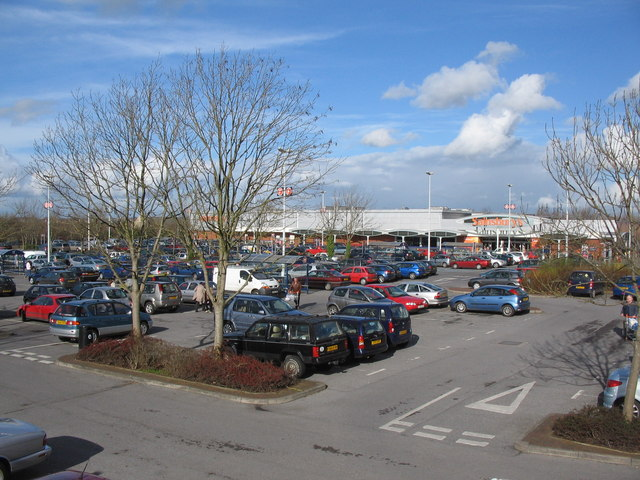
- Superstore at Harry Stoke, in 2007

- Location within Gloucestershire
- OS grid reference: ST6184079946
- Civil parish: Stoke Gifford
- Unitary authority: South Gloucestershire
- Ceremonial county: Gloucestershire
- Region: South West
- Country: England
- Sovereign state: United Kingdom
- Post town: BRISTOL
- Postcode district: BS34
- Dialling code: 01454
- Police: Avon and Somerset
- Fire: Avon
- Ambulance: South Western
- UK Parliament: Filton and Bradley Stoke

Harry Stoke is a village in the parish of Stoke Gifford, South Gloucestershire, England.

== History ==
There were three manors in the parish of Stoke Gifford. The Giffards and Berkeleys held Stoke and Walls. Harry Stoke was a separate manor held by Aldred in Saxon times, Theobald in Norman times and the Blount and De Filton families in medieval times. The Berkeleys bought it in the 16th century.

One of the last coal mines in the Bristol Coalfield was at Harry Stoke. The mine was a drift mine, begun in 1952. Bad roof conditions made the mine uneconomical, and it closed in 1963.

== Expansion ==
In 2017, around 2,700 homes were planned to be built in Harry Stoke, along with a primary school, local centre, community facilities and landscape areas. Construction started in 2020 and 2021, building from the new bypass road as its centre. As well as new housing, halls of residence for University of the West of England students are also being built in Harry Stoke.
