= Patchway =

Town in Gloucestershire, England

Coordinates: 51.5314°N 2.5879°W

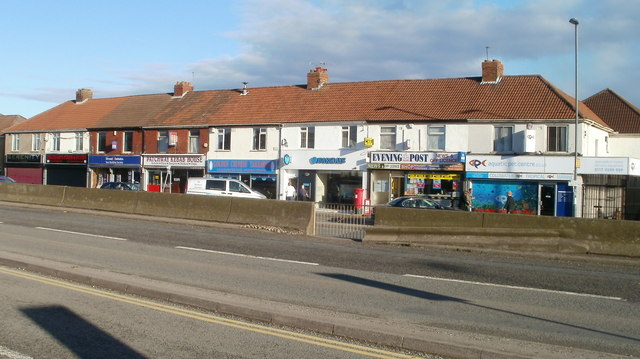
- Gloucester Road shops, Patchway

- Location within Gloucestershire
- Population: 10,511 (2011 Census)
- OS grid reference: ST593815
- Unitary authority: South Gloucestershire
- Ceremonial county: Gloucestershire
- Region: South West
- Country: England
- Sovereign state: United Kingdom
- Post town: BRISTOL
- Postcode district: BS34
- Dialling code: 0117
- Police: Avon and Somerset
- Fire: Avon
- Ambulance: South Western
- UK Parliament: Filton and Bradley Stoke

Patchway is a town and civil parish in South Gloucestershire, England, situated 6 mi (9.7 km) north-northwest of central Bristol. The town has become an overflow settlement for Bristol and is contiguous with Bristol's urban area, along with the nearby towns of Filton and Bradley Stoke.

Patchway is twinned with Clermont l'Herault, France, and Gauting, Germany. It was established as a civil parish in 1953, becoming separate from the parish of nearby Almondsbury.

== Governance ==
An electoral ward with the same name exists. This ward has a population taken at the 2011 census was 9,071.

The town council is made up of 15 councillors and is elected every 4 years. The head of the council holds the title of town Mayor. The mayor, who is a councillor, is elected each year by the sitting councillors. The current mayor is Councillor Dayley Lawrence (Labour Party) and His deputy is Councillor Angela Morey (Labour Party).

As of the local elections held on 4 May 2023 the political parties and number of councillors are as follows Labour Party. 10 (+4) Independent. 4 (No change) Conservative. 1 (-4)

== Locations and businesses ==
Patchway, where Rolls-Royce is a major aerospace employer, lies just north of Filton Airfield where BAE Systems and Airbus UK are also major aerospace employers. The town comprises three areas until 2015 when Stoke Lodge formed its own Parish council: Patchway Estate, Stoke Lodge and Aztec West.

Housing in Patchway Estate lies southwest of the main London-South Wales railway line. Coniston Road circles the estate, where many of the streets are named after birds and trees. Patchway Trading Estate is adjacent to the dual carriageway linking the A38 and M5. The mall and two retail parks at Cribbs Causeway, just north of Filton airfield, form the largest shopping centre in South West England.

On the opposite side of the railway track, (since 2015 no longer part of Patchway) is the Stoke Lodge housing estate. Now called Stoke Lodge and the Common Parish Council, The A38 trunk road, upgraded to a dual carriageway in the mid-1970s, separates the two housing estates.

Aztec West, an office and warehouse park, is situated on the northern fringes of the town, sandwiched between Patchway Estate and Stoke Lodge. The CEGB Pension Fund started the park in the early 1980s and it is now owned by Arlington. New phases of this development are being built.

A major four-level motorway interchange (M4/M5) is close to Aztec West. Called the Almondsbury Interchange, it was completed in the early 1970s.

Patchway Greenway is a semi-rural footpath which leads from Patchway Common eastwards to Bradley Stoke. On the north-west fringe of Patchway Estate, a footbridge (known locally as the Banana Bridge) passes over the M5 motorway, and leads to a footpath that passes down over the steep Severn Escarpment into the village of Over.

Patchway railway station is on the mainline South Wales-London railway line, but the service to Bristol is infrequent with just a single train per hour which is frequently shortformed (meaning it should have three carriages but arrives with only two so that prospective passengers are unable to board) during rush hour.

== Recent history ==
At the start of the 20th century, Patchway was a small village centred on Patchway Green, now known as Patchway Common. Part of the village straddled Gloucester Road, south of the bridge which passed over the Great Western Railway line from Bristol to South Wales. Patchway Tunnel was nearby.

Industrialization started when a flying school at Filton Aerodrome was converted into an aeroengine factory, when the Bristol Aeroplane Company (BAC) acquired Cosmos Engineering in 1920.

During the 1930s, new housing was built on Patchway Estate, just north of Filton Aerodrome, and bungalows were built on Stoke Lane.

BAC started the development of East Works on Gypsy Patch Lane during the re-armament programme of the 1930s. Engine component testing facilities were built alongside the main railway line during the 1930s, 1940s and 1950s.

A dual carriageway, known as the Filton Bypass, was constructed through Patchway Estate in the late 1930s, to divert A38 road traffic away from Filton. During World War II, the US Army had a tented encampment along the wide verges of the bypass. In the late 1940s the bypass was severed by the extension of the main runway at Filton aerodrome to accommodate the Bristol Brabazon airliner. This project also required the demolition of the nearby hamlet of Charlton, many of whose residents were rehoused on Patchway Estate.

In the 1950s and early 1960s a large bungalow estate was built at Stoke Lodge, adjacent to Patchway Common. A huge overspill estate was built at the back of Patchway Estate in the mid-1960s.

Also in the mid-1960s, the New Filton Bypass (now part of the M5 motorway) was constructed, on the north-west fringe of Patchway Estate, along the upper edge of the Severn Escarpment. This road forms the boundary between the town of Patchway and the adjacent Green Belt.

Patchway was the site of the 1987 spree killings carried out by 24-year-old Kevin Weaver, who entered the Alexandra Workwear factory on Britannia Road armed with three shotguns. He fatally shot computer manager David Pursall and accountant John Peterson after bludgeoning his mother and sister in Redfield earlier in the day.

Rolls-Royce have built new production facilities on the Gypsy Patch test site, close to the A38 and have completely demolished the old East Works, for redevelopment. All the Rolls-Royce Bristol facilities are now north of Gypsy Patch Lane, the former West Works site on the airfield having been redeveloped by the Post Office in the late 1980s.

== Modern Patchway ==
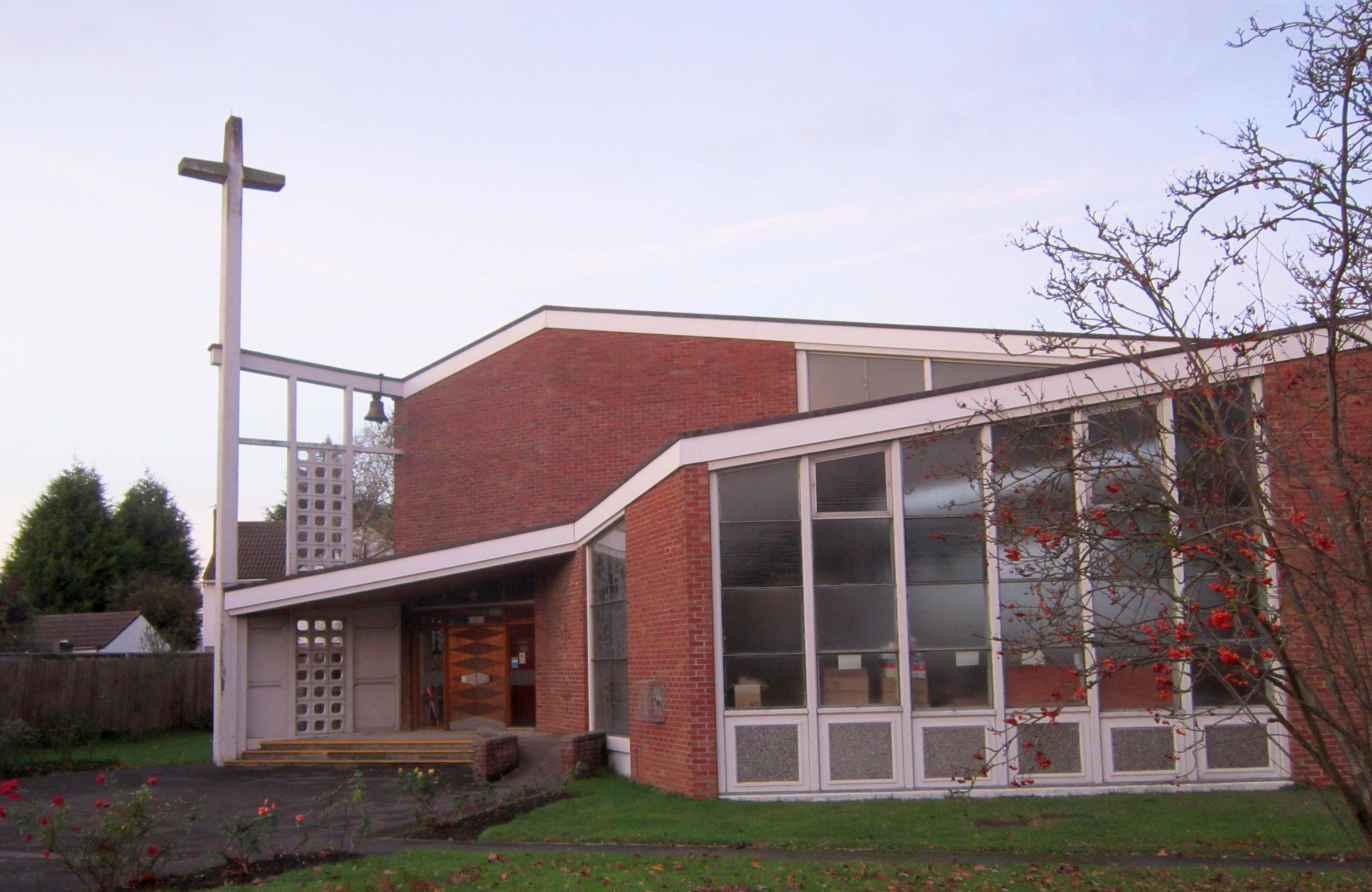
St Chad's mixed Church of England and Methodist Church

Patchway is one of the 44 Parish and Town Councils in South Gloucestershire. Amenities include a fire station, library, doctor's clinic and schools. There is a Day Centre for the elderly and a children's play area. Sports facilities include cricket and football pitches and a sports hall.

The Britannia public house was demolished in March 2010.

During mid-2010 the then library premises were vacated with a small library being set up in the nearby Casson Centre. The old library premises were demolished and this site was incorporated with that of the former Britannia public house to facilitate the building of a new three storey construction on behalf of the local NHS Trust – The Hub. The building includes various social health and well-being amenities for use by all ages, besides a new library. The majority of the structure for the first two storeys had taken shape by Christmas 2010. By Autumn 2011 the structure of the building was complete and the building was being fitted out. External groundwork and paving was mostly complete by now as well. The Hub was opened on Monday 5 September 2011 and has since become a focal point of the locality. Due to its height, rising to three storeys, and position on the gently rising slope of Rodway Road, the Hub building can be seen rising above the surrounding buildings, particularly when approaching the area from the north side, over the railway bridge.

Patchway has had a long connection with the Scout Movement, with the Headquarters being located in buildings of Worthing Road – behind the Town Council offices. In June 2011 the Scout Movement are celebrating their 70th anniversary and will be holding special events to commemorate this.

At the end of August 2011, work began to revise the road layout on Highwood Lane, which will see all through traffic eliminated, the road being closed to normal traffic between Coniston Road and Durban Road, apart from access to the local centre at the Durban Road end. The south side of the then current dual-carriageway becoming part of the internal roadway network for the Charlton Hayes development and the north side being restricted to buses only.

On 1 April 2015 the Stoke Lodge part of Patchway, which is located to the north of the railway line, on the eastern side of the A38, became part of the new parish of Stoke Lodge and The Common.

== Charlton Hayes ==
Charlton Hayes is a new extension to Patchway to the south, named after the demolished village of Charlton. Construction started in late 2009 and includes a new bypass road from the A38 to the bottom of the Cribbs Causeway Mall. Approximately 6000 new homes will be in the final development.

The new link road – Hayes Way − opened just before Christmas 2010, just in time to assist in relieving Highwood Lane of some of the serious road traffic pressure which have previously been experienced on Highwood Lane. The road provides a direct link from The Mall (Cribbs Causeway) to the main A38 heading north out of Bristol towards the M5/M4 junction at Almondsbury and, prior to the construction of the Aerospace Bristol museum, granted users a chance to glimpse the Concorde 216 that was stored at the airfield.

In May 2023 it became its own parish council and is no longer part of Patchway Town Council.

== Media ==
Local television news programmes are BBC Points West and ITV News West Country both broadcast from Bristol.

The town is served by the local radio stations, BBC Radio Bristol, Heart West, Greatest Hits Radio Bristol & The South West, Hits Radio Bristol, BCfm, Kiss and Bradley Stoke Radio, a community based station which is fully operated by volunteers.

Local newspapers are the Bristol Post and Patchway Journal which is an online newspaper.

== Sport ==
The town has its own non league football club, Patchway Town F.C. who currently play in the Bristol Premier Combination Division One at the Scott Park ground.

== See also ==
- Aztec West
- Cribbs Causeway
