= Northavon =

Former non-metropolitan district in England

Coordinates: 51.604°N 2.518°W

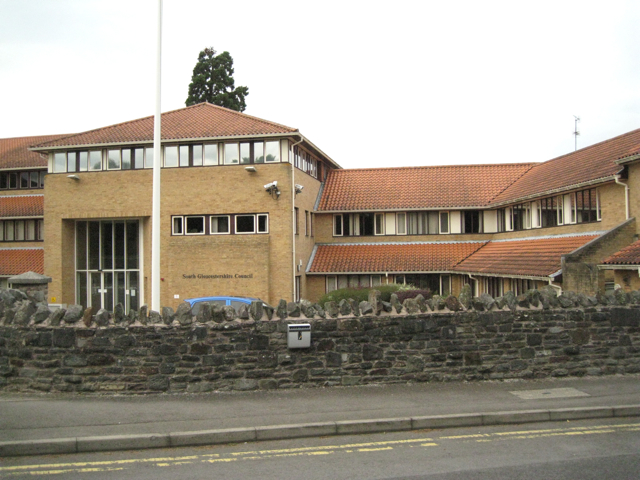
- Council offices, Thornbury, in 2010

- Coat of arms

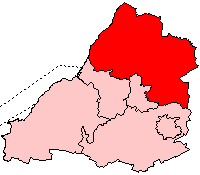
- Northavon District within the County of Avon
- Area
  - 1974: 114,028 acres (461.45 km^{2})
- Population
  - 1973: 110,620
  - 1992: 135,700
- History
  - Created: 1 April 1974
  - Abolished: 31 March 1996
  - Succeeded by: South Gloucestershire
- Status: Non-metropolitan district
- Government
  - HQ: Thornbury
  - Motto: Fides in Cives (Faithfulness towards our fellow citizens)

Northavon was a district in the English county of Avon from 1974 to 1996.

The district was formed by the Local Government Act 1972 on 1 April 1974 as part of a reform of local authorities throughout England and Wales. Under the reorganisation, the area surrounding the cities of Bath and Bristol was formed into a new county of "Avon", named after the river that runs through the area. The county was divided into six districts, one of which was formed from the areas of Sodbury Rural District (except the parish of Alderley) and most of Thornbury Rural District (16 out of 21 parishes) in Gloucestershire. The district was given the name "Northavon" in 1973, denoting the district's position in the county.

In 1991 the county boundaries of Avon and Gloucestershire were realigned. The main effect of the change was that the Hillesley and Tresham area was transferred from Northavon to the neighbouring District of Stroud in Gloucestershire.

Following a review by the Local Government Commission for England, both the County of Avon and District of Northavon were abolished on 1 April 1996. Northavon was merged with the neighbouring borough of Kingswood to form the unitary authority of South Gloucestershire.

The name Northavon was also used for a parliamentary constituency, created in 1983. It was abolished ahead of the 2010 general election, with its area being split between the constituencies of Filton and Bradley Stoke and Thornbury and Yate.

== Premises ==
In 1986 Northavon District Council built a civic centre on Castle Street in Thornbury, at the corner with Stokefield Close. The building remained the council's meeting place and main offices until the council's abolition in 1996. The building was subsequently used by South Gloucestershire Council until 2013. It has since been demolished and Alexandra Lodge, a development of retirement homes, has been built on the site.

== See also ==
- Northavon District Council elections
