= Over, South Gloucestershire =

Village in Gloucestershire, England

Coordinates: 51.540°N 2.596°W

Over
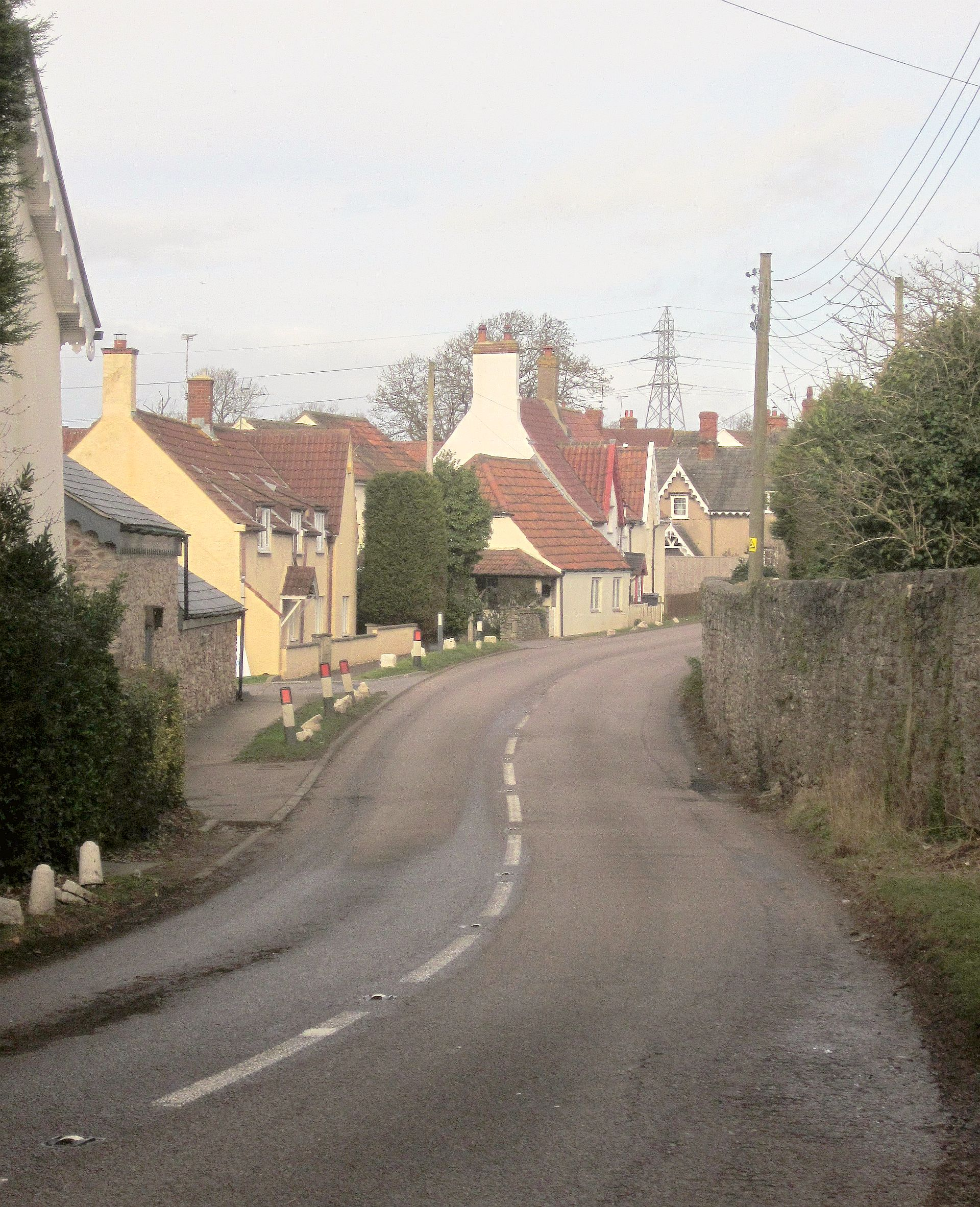
- Civil parish: Almondsbury
- Unitary authority: South Gloucestershire
- Ceremonial county: Gloucestershire
- Country: England
- Sovereign state: United Kingdom
- Post town: Bristol
- UK Parliament: Thornbury and Yate

Over is a village in the civil parish of Almondsbury in South Gloucestershire, England, 6 miles (10 km) north of Bristol. It lies on the B4055, a road that parallels the M5 from Junction 17 to 16. The road, known locally as Over Lane, abuts to the east a ridge which overlooks the Severn floodplain, dominated by Bristol Golf Club or Course. According to local legends, a ghost of an old woman haunts this place every New Year's Eve.

== Built environment ==
Springwood Nurseries and Almondsbury's paired garden centres which are notable for large outdoor areas.

Beyond the clustered settlement, before the lane climbs to the north it passes over the London to South Wales Main Line, a railway emerging from Patchway Tunnel before heading across the Severn floodplain to the Severn Tunnel.

Its main station is Bristol Parkway station a few miles to the southeast. Via mainly rural, linear Easter Compton parish or footpaths and tiny lanes which follow the line closely Pilning railway station is a walk about 2 miles (3.2 km) away. The area is road-dominated and the loss of the deer parks has diminished tourism. In 2015 Pilning was the sixth-least used station in the UK — 68 passenger entries/exits were recorded for the year.

== Deer parks ==
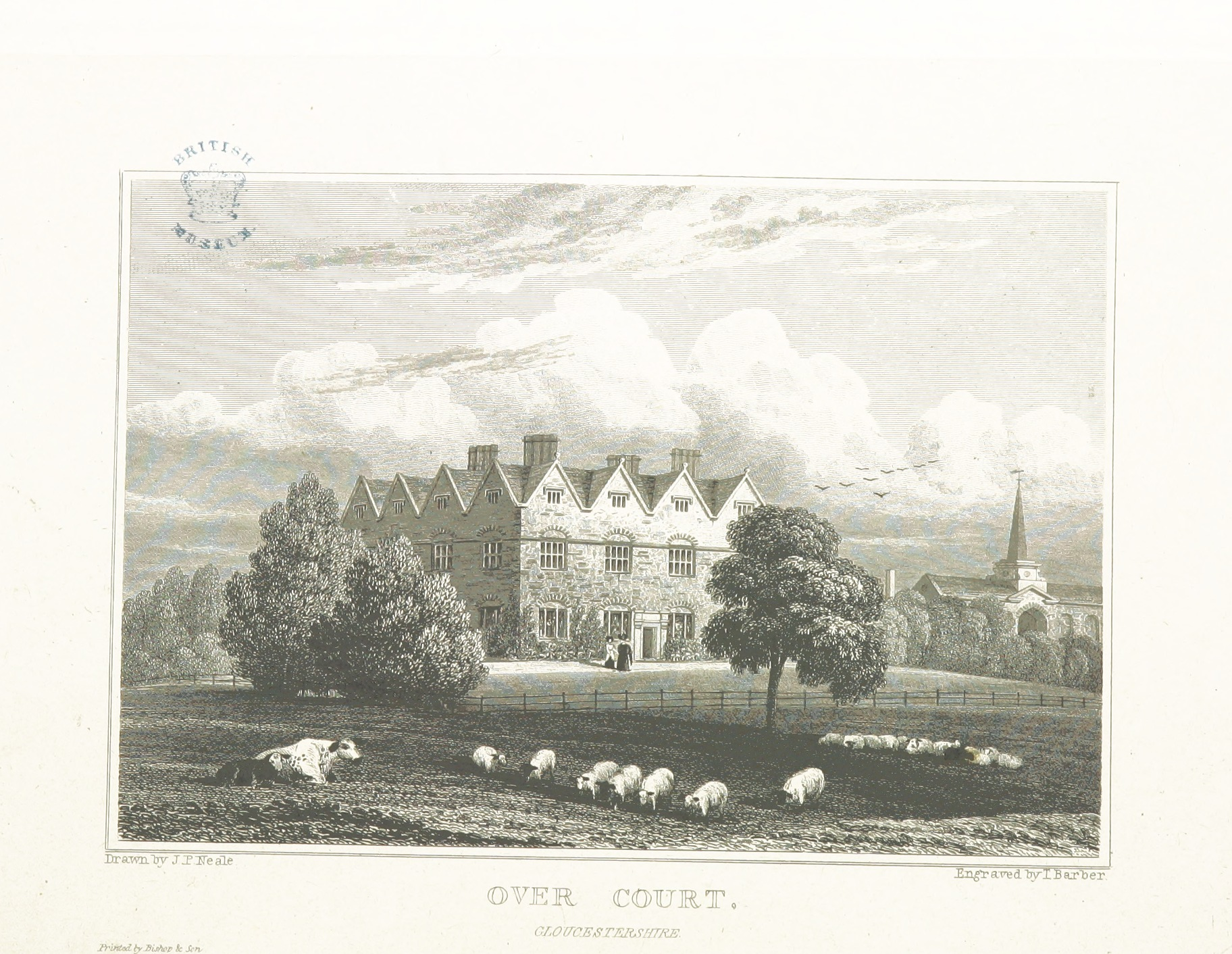
Over Court, 1824 engraving

Over Court had a large deer park, which was largely replaced in the 20th century by the golf venue.

A similar deer park was higher and to the north at Knole Park, the house of which was centred on a small knoll which was a fortified Roman camp. Most of its grounds have been replaced by a large brick quarry,
