= Stoke Gifford =

Village and civil parish in Gloucestershire, England

Coordinates: 51.517°N 2.548°W

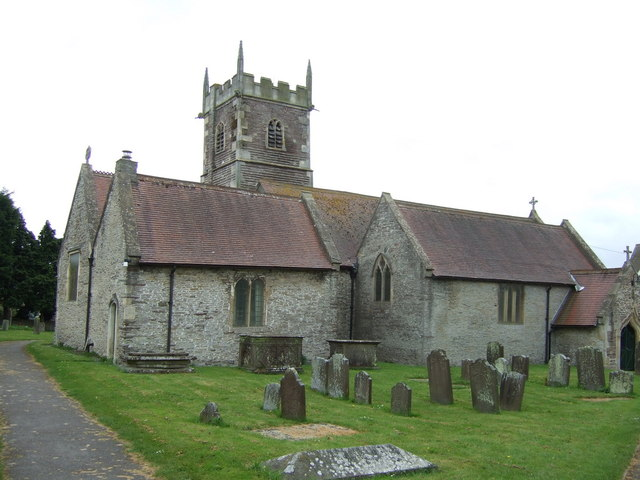
- St Michael’s Church

- Location within Gloucestershire
- Population: 19,794 (2021 Census, before parish boundary changes)
- OS grid reference: ST621799
- Civil parish: Stoke Gifford
- Unitary authority: South Gloucestershire
- Ceremonial county: Gloucestershire
- Region: South West
- Country: England
- Sovereign state: United Kingdom
- Post town: BRISTOL
- Postcode district: BS34
- Dialling code: 01454, 0117
- Police: Avon and Somerset
- Fire: Avon
- Ambulance: South Western
- UK Parliament: Filton and Bradley Stoke

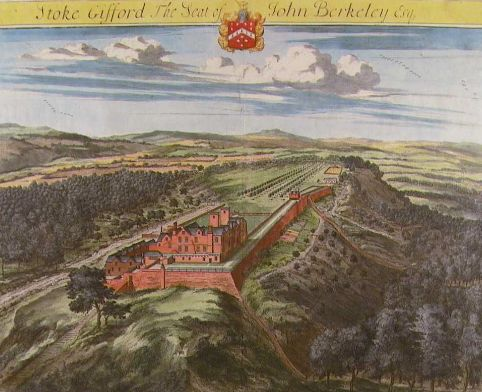
Stoke Park, Stoke Gifford, Glos., hypothetical view from the south-east, as painted by Johannes Kip in 1707. It then belonged to John Berkeley esquire, as stated by the caption above which displays the arms of Berkeley of Stoke Gifford. Published in Britannia Illustrata 1724 edition

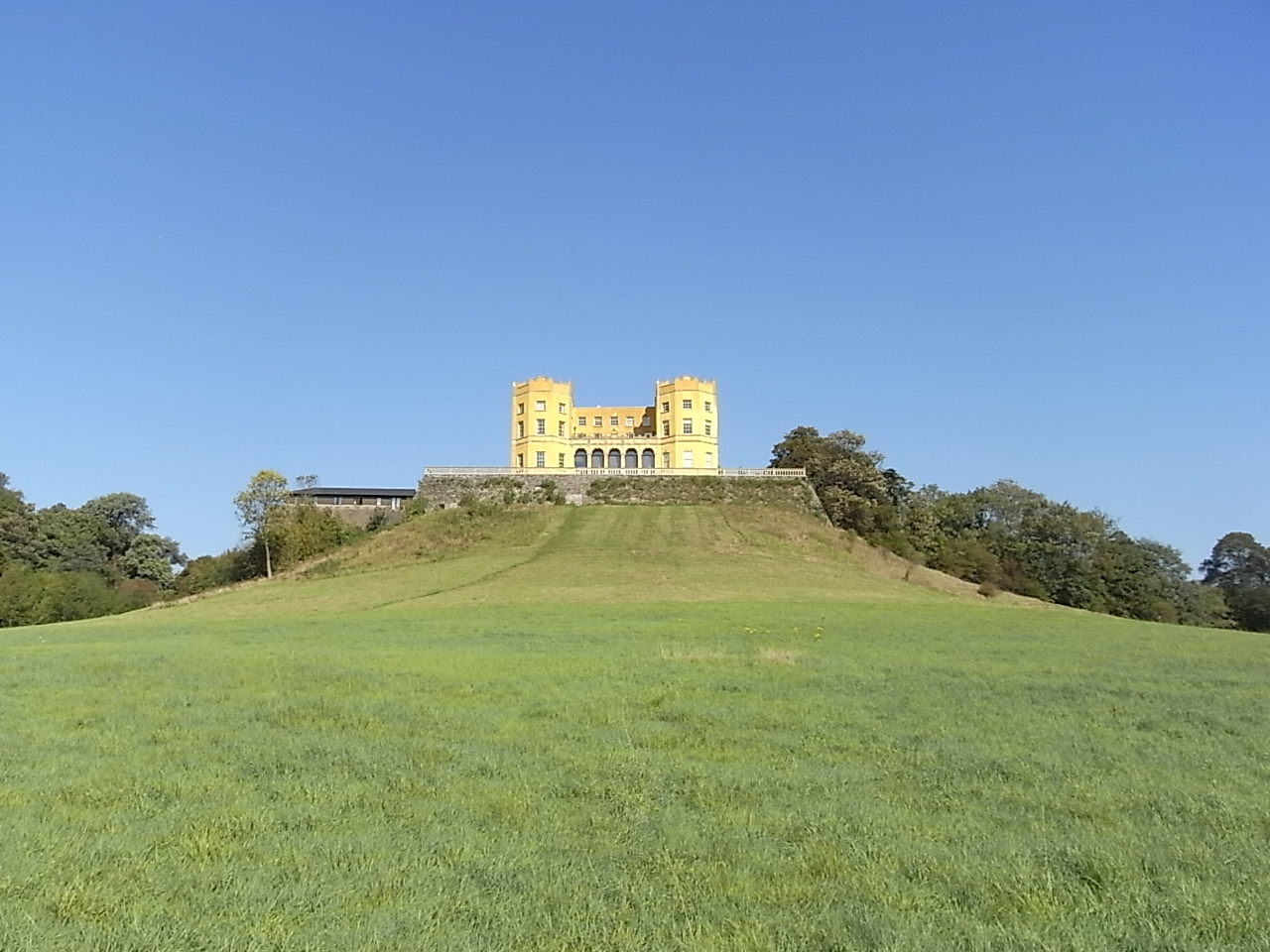
Stoke Park in 2011, viewed from south, as visible from the northbound carriageway of the M32 motorway which now cuts across the former parkland. It is now known as "The Dower House" and split into private apartments. An engraving of Stoke Park was published in the Copper Plate Magazine in 1796.

Stoke Gifford is a large village and civil parish in the South Gloucestershire district, in the ceremonial county of Gloucestershire, England. It forms part of the Bristol built-up area, part of the city's North Fringe. The ward had 14,200 residents in 5,788 households at the 2021 census and the parish had 19,794.

It is served by Bristol Parkway railway station and is home to Stoke Gifford depot, on the London-South Wales railway line. To the south, it is served by the Bristol Ring Road.

Several major employers and office parks are located in Stoke Gifford, including the Bristol offices of Aviva which took over Friends Life in 2015. The Stoke Gifford area is also home to the main campus of the University of the West of England, and offices of Hewlett-Packard and MOD Abbey Wood, although since 2023 parish boundary changes these are now in the Stoke Park and Cheswick parish.

The parish includes the neighbourhoods of Little Stoke and Harry Stoke. It borders Filton, to the south-west, Patchway to the north west, Bradley Stoke to the north, Winterbourne and Hambrook to the east, and Cheswick to the south.

== History ==
=== Manor of Giffard ===
Following the Norman Invasion of 1066, William the Conqueror gave the manor of Stoke Gifford to Osbern Giffard, one of his knights. Giffard himself was a native of Longueville-le-Giffard, Normandy, now known as Longueville-sur-Scie, from which the 'Gifford' suffix derives. The 'Stoke' part of the name may come from the Stoke Brook, or may also be a reference to the Saxon word 'Stoche' meaning 'property of or dependent farmstead'. Bradley Stoke and Stoke Lodge, both 20th-century estates, were also given the name. Extensive histories of Stoke Gifford can be found online.

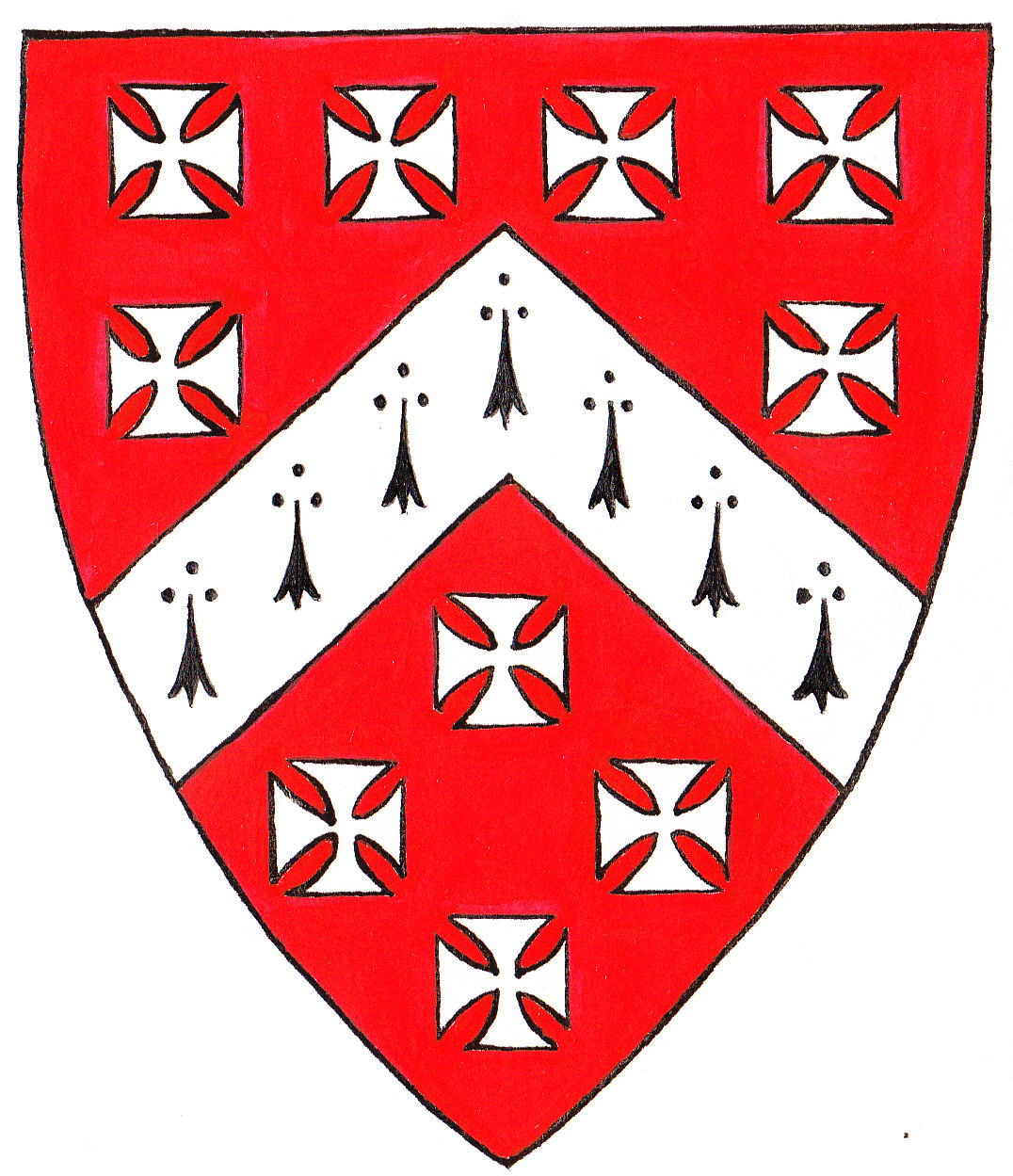
Arms of Berkeley of Stoke Gifford: Gules, a chevron ermine between ten crosses pattee argent. These arms may be seen in The Gaunts Chapel, Bristol and are the arms of the Barons Berkeley with the difference of a chevron ermine in place of a chevron argent

The manor remained in the Giffard family until 1337, when it was granted to Maurice de Berkeley (died 1347), 2nd son of Maurice de Berkeley, 2nd Baron Berkeley (1271–1326). Thus was founded the long and distinguished cadet branch of "Berkeley of Stoke Gifford". In 1553, a new late-Tudor manor house was built by Sir Richard Berkeley (died 1604), 7th in descent from Maurice de Berkeley (died 1347). During the siege of Bristol in 1645, the house was used as the headquarters of General Fairfax. It became known as Stoke Park and was rebuilt in 1750 by Norborne Berkeley, 4th Baron Botetourt (died 1770), from a neo-classical design by Thomas Wright.

=== Urban expansion in the 20th and 21st centuries ===
Like much of the nearby area, Stoke Gifford saw rapid population expansion in the late 20th century. Before the 1980s Stoke Gifford was just a small village, straggling along the main street, North Road. In 1987 it was designated for urban expansion, alongside neighbouring Bradley Stoke, as part of the Avon County Council Structural Plan and Northavon Local Plan.

In 2023, following an increase in housing and population in the south of the parish, it was divided into two, with the southern part becoming a new parish of Stoke Park and Cheswick.

Population history
Year	Population
2001	10,951
2011	15,494
2021	19,794

== Governance ==
The area falls in the Stoke Gifford electoral ward. This ward starts in the east at Winterbourne.

In 1894 Stoke Gifford became part of Barton Regis Rural District, in 1904 it became part of Chipping Sodbury Rural District, in 1935 it became part of Sodbury Rural District, in 1974 it became part of Northavon non-metropolitan district in the non-metropolitan county of Avon, in 1996 it became part of the South Gloucestershire unitary authority area in the ceremonial county of Gloucestershire.

== Local amenities ==
The Church of England parish church of St Michael's is a Grade II* listed building.

There is a row of shops on Ratcliffe Drive including a Tesco Express, dentist and medical centre and a few more shops on one of the roads off North Road. There is a pub, the Beaufort Arms, and a small coffee shop in the Old School Rooms across The Green from the church. There are several large supermarkets within walking distance.

Local children walk or cycle to nearby St Michael's C of E Primary School & Abbeywood Community School, while the church runs a pre-school nursery in the old vicarage. In 2008, a new pre-school and Nursery opened adjacent to Bristol Parkway because of population increases in the surrounding areas. The Old School Rooms hosts the Explorer Scouts, Scouts, Cub Scouts, Beaver Scouts and Brownies.

The area has two parks, each with children's play equipment, and a pair of tennis courts. South of Stoke Gifford is Bristol's Stoke Park, part of a large green area known as the 'Green Lung'.

Stoke Gifford Parish Council provoked national interest and condemnation in April 2016 when they resolved to charge parkrun runners a fee to use a park, resulting in the closure of the event in June 2016.

Stoke Gifford Cricket Club has won the Bristol & District 30 over cricket league a record three times in 2018, 2021 and 2022.
