= Bradley Stoke Community School =

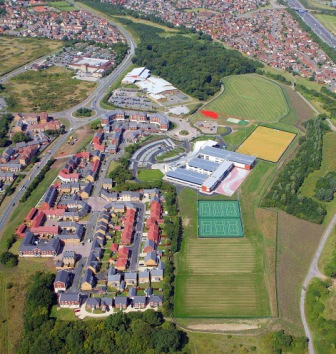
- Aerial photo of the school and its surroundings

Location
- Fiddlers Wood Lane; Bradley Stoke, Gloucestershire, BS32 9BS; England; 51.5343°N 2.5429°W

Information
- Type: All-through academy
- Established: 2005; 21 years ago
- Trust: The Olympus Academy Trust
- Department for Education URN: 137753 Tables
- Ofsted: Reports
- Head: Sophie Francis
- Gender: Mixed
- Age: 4 to 18
- Enrolment: 1,117
- Capacity: 1,110
- Website: www.bradleystokecs.org.uk

Bradley Stoke Community School, often locally referred to by its abbreviated form "BSCS", is an all-through mixed-sex academy located in Bradley Stoke, on the northern outskirts of Bristol in the United Kingdom.

== History ==
The construction of BSCS was completed in July 2005 and the school opened in September to accommodate the year 7 pupils. In 2008, the school was awarded specialist status in Performing Arts. The school was rated good by the Ofsted inspection in April 2013.

In January 2012, the school converted to an academy. The school's name remained the same, but the academy trust was named the Olympus Academy Trust after the Rolls-Royce Olympus jet engine which powered Concorde. The academy is part of the Concorde Partnership, a collaboration between South Gloucestershire and Stroud College and nine schools in South Gloucestershire which share resources and courses.

In 2014, a new primary school phase started construction on the site of a former overflow car park for the secondary academy. Planning permission was approved on 1 August 2014, and as of 10 October cost £3 million, being £750,000 over budget. The school was expected to open in September 2015, in time for the 2015–16 academic year.

The trust now comprises nine local schools.

== Academic achievement ==
GCSE results
Bradley Stoke Community School had its best ever GCSE results in 2016 with a big improvement over the previous year. 68% of students achieved 5A*-C including English and maths. The new measure of basics (English and maths A*-C combined) was achieved by 69% of students.

The schools Progress 8 measure is 0.17.

In 2016, 82% of students achieved an A*-C grade in English and 73% achieved A*-C in Maths, contributing to the school becoming the best-performing in South Gloucestershire.
