= Bradley Stoke =

Town and civil parish in South Gloucestershire, England

Coordinates: 51°32′08″N 2°32′47″W

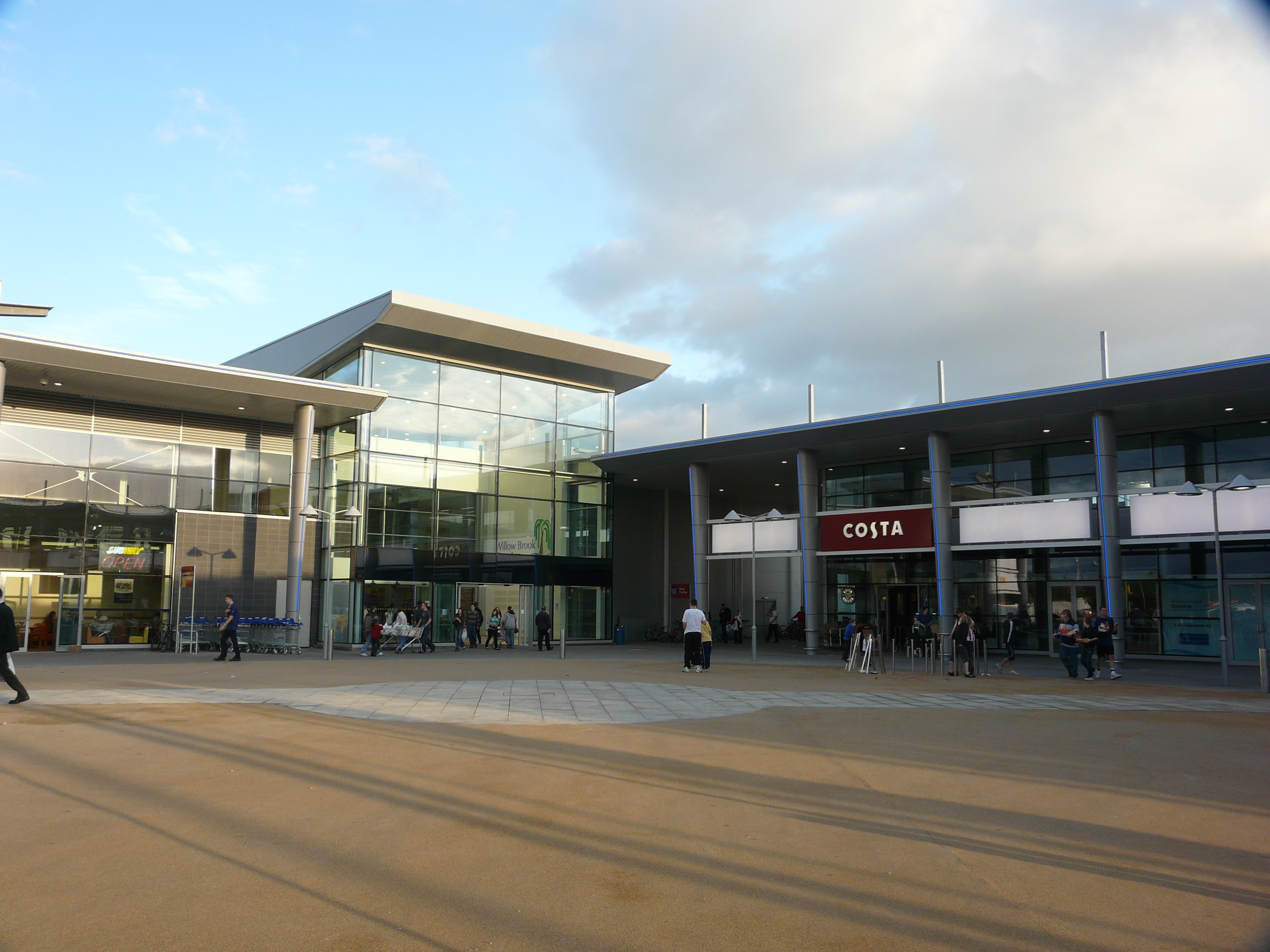
- Willow Brook Centre, the town centre

- Location within Gloucestershire
- Population: 20,690 (2021 census)
- OS grid reference: ST621813
- Unitary authority: South Gloucestershire
- Ceremonial county: Gloucestershire
- Region: South West
- Country: England
- Sovereign state: United Kingdom
- Post town: Bristol
- Postcode district: BS32
- Dialling code: 0117 and 01454
- Police: Avon and Somerset
- Fire: Avon
- Ambulance: South Western
- UK Parliament: Filton and Bradley Stoke

Bradley Stoke is a town and civil parish in South Gloucestershire, England, situated 6 miles (10 kilometres) north-northeast of Bristol city centre. The town is the northernmost part of the Bristol built-up area.

Planned in the late-1970s, building works began in 1987. Bradley Stoke was Europe's largest new town built with private investment. It is named after two local streams, the Bradley Brook and Stoke Brook.

Bradley Stoke is part of the North Fringe of Bristol, an extensive area of housing and employment developed during the late 20th and early 21st centuries. It is bordered by Patchway to the west and Stoke Gifford to the south, but unlike these neighbours, Bradley Stoke has fewer major employers and is primarily a residential suburb, being 40% detached housing. The M5 and M4 motorways form its northern and eastern boundaries, beyond which is the Avon Green Belt.

== History ==
The area that is now Bradley Stoke was once farmland north of the village of Stoke Gifford near Bristol city. The land was divided amongst the civil parishes of Stoke Gifford, Almondsbury, Patchway and Winterbourne. The area consisted of a number of farms, Bailey's Court and Watch Elm Farm in the south, Bowsland Farm and Manor Farm in the north and Webb's Farm in the middle. Some of the lands were used as pasture. A number of woods also existed, Sherbourne's Brake, Webb's Wood and the large Savage's Wood have all been preserved. Fiddlers Wood, the name of which lives on in Fiddlers Wood Lane was all but obliterated by the M4 motorway. Baileys Court Farmhouse is the only original building that still remains and was used as offices by the town's developers before becoming the Bailey's Court Inn. Watch Elm Farm was named after the Watch Elm, an elm of a legendary size that blew down in the mid 18th century. The Stoke Brook flows through the middle of Bradley Stoke.

During its development, the new settlement faced some problems in the wake of a national recession. At the time, Bradley Stoke was reputed to be one of Europe's largest private housing developments and did struggle to develop at first to establish itself as an identifiable town unlike other earlier new towns which were supported by a development corporation, as the settlement relied principally on private investment within a restricted statutory framework of the local authority Northavon District Council within the Avon County Council area. A combination of private housebuilders led the development and with only limited input from commercial businesses and the consequent recession resulted in the new town gaining a reputation for being a soulless housing estate with only limited facilities and no town centre, with the exception of a Tesco supermarket. High interest rates during the early 1990s soon led to the collapse of the property market in the area with many new homes falling into negative equity. This led to the branding of the new town as 'Sadly Broke' until property values and the development market began to recover. Since 1987, the residents of the area were demanding the establishment of a separate town council to coordinate the community's civic life and in 1991 formation of the town council was in principle approved. On 1 April 1992, the newly elected town council took charge.

== Governance ==
Bradley Stoke has a local town council, is part of the South Gloucestershire unitary authority, and is in the West of England Combined Authority (WECA) region.

On South Gloucestershire Council, the town is represented by seven councillors elected from three electoral wards, namely Bradley Stoke North, Bradley Stoke South and Stoke Gifford (Stoke Brook).

Bradley Stoke is part of the Filton and Bradley Stoke parliamentary constituency.

The area is situated within the historic and ceremonial county of Gloucestershire. Following the creation of county councils in 1889 and urban and rural districts in 1894, it was administered by Gloucestershire county council and Thornbury rural district council until local government reorganisation in the early 1970s. From 1974 until 1996, Bradley Stoke was part of the Northavon district of the non-metropolitan county of Avon. Since the abolition of Avon and its replacement by unitary authorities in 1996, the area has been administered by South Gloucestershire council (formed from the merger of Northavon district and Kingswood borough councils).

=== Town council ===
Bradley Stoke has a town council made up of 15 councillors elected from five wards. The town council is chaired by the town mayor and assisted by a deputy mayor, with four standing committees for finance, planning and environment, leisure, youth and amenities, and staffing.

== Facilities ==
Many of the facilities in the town were to be funded by the housing developers from housing sales, via 'Section 106' planning agreements. When house building and sales slowed for a time in the late 80s, there was a significant slowdown in facility completion. This included the late provision of the road joining the north and south sides of the town, and also the completion of the doctors' surgery.

The new town centre 'Willow Brook' was named by an anonymous resident as part of a competition run by Bradley Stoke Town Council in partnership with Tesco. The centre is situated on the original Tesco supermarket site, and the redevelopment was approved by South Gloucestershire Council on 13 November 2006.

=== Council ===
The Bradley Stoke Town Council operates three activity centres located at The Bradley Stoke Jubilee Centre on Savages Wood Road, Baileys Court Activity Centre on Baileys Court Road and Brook Way Activity Centre on Brook Way. Each activity centre offers rooms and facilities to hire, and the provision of sports activities such as bowls, football pitches and hardball courts.

=== Bradley Stoke Leisure Centre and library ===
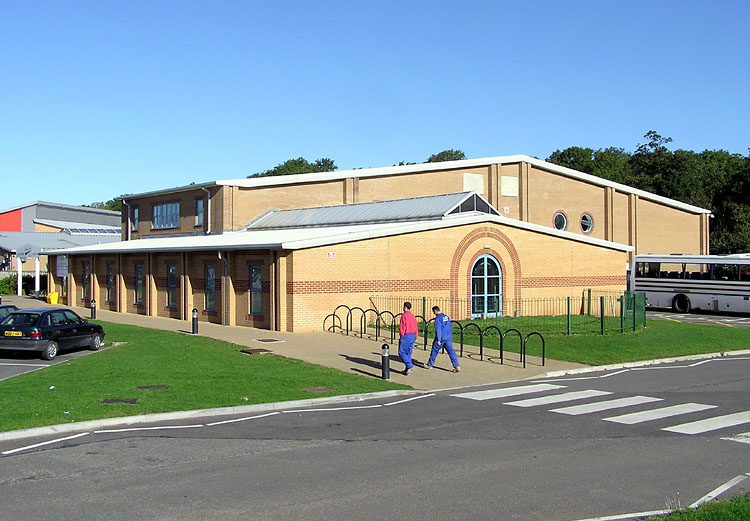
Bradley Stoke Leisure Centre and library.

The Active leisure centre near the town centre provides access to a 25 metre swimming pool and a public library. Additional services at the leisure centre include a gym, beauty salon, Soho Coffee and a skate park. The leisure centre and library are host to many in house and local activity groups.

In 2018, renovations reduced the sports hall in size and introduced a small climbing centre (amongst other changes).

The Soho coffee shop was established in June 2013 and was renovated in 2017.

=== Employment ===
Employment opportunities are found along Great Stoke Way to the south, Woodlands Business Park and Almondsbury Business Park to the north, and at the Aztec West development. The town is served by the nearby Bristol Parkway railway station in Stoke Gifford and is a short distance from the Ministry of Defence, the Aviva Centre and the Abbeywood Retail Park. Situated in the surrounding business parks are companies including RAC, Paragon, DHL, Greencore, Pukka Herbs, EE, GE Capital, HSS Hire, Zuken Technology Centre, and various hotels, production factories, courier services, warehouses and offices.

The further developments of the Willow Brook Centre and the addition of larger high street chains have increased the number of jobs available for local residents as well as boosted trade within Bradley Stoke. Businesses continue to be interested in the further development of the town centre, such as the planning application to build drive-through commercial units adjacent to Bradley Stoke Way.

Bradley Stoke attracts custom through passing trade from those exiting and joining the motorways and commuting, however since the expansion of the Willow Brook Centre both business owners and potential employees are attracted to the area. Despite the available employment opportunities, many residents commute from Bradley Stoke to central Bristol, The Mall in Cribbs Causeway or via the nearby motorway junction for work.

== Education ==
The town has seven primary schools:

- Saint Marys Catholic Primary School
- Bailey's Court Primary School
- Wheatfield Primary School
- Meadowbrook Primary School
- Holy Trinity Primary School
- Bowsland Green Primary School
- Bradley Stoke Community Primary School

The town has a comprehensive secondary school, Bradley Stoke Community School, which opened in September 2005 with capacity for 1,120 students. A post-16 centre at the school was completed in Summer 2010, and a primary school extension was completed in 2015.

== Transport ==
Bradley Stoke is served by Bristol Parkway railway station to the south and Patchway railway station to the west, both operated by Great Western Railway.

Bus services are operated by First West of England and Stagecoach West offering transport links to Aztec West, Thornbury, Cribbs Causeway, Bristol Parkway railway Station, Bristol city centre and the University of the West of England, Bristol. A new MetroBus service was introduced by Bristol Community Transport under contract by FirstGroup.

Bradley Stoke borders the M5 to the north, the M4 to the east and the M32 to the south. Main transport routes are via Aztec West and via the Stoke Gifford bypass to the south.

== Community ==
The Bradley Stoke Community Festival has been running since 2004 and is held over a weekend in June. The festival hosts a variety of activities and events primarily aimed at young children and families involving live music, performances, sports and games.

A Bradley Stoke Community Carnival event took place in 2014, 2015 and 2017. The carnival hosted stilt walkers, a brass band, performers dressed in costumes, competitions and prizes and live music.

Similarly to the Bradley Stoke Community Festival, Wheatfest is an annual event hosted by a local group Friends of Wheatfield Primary School. The event on the grounds of Wheatfield Primary School is primarily aimed at young children and families. The 2019 event raised over £6000.

The Willow Brook Centre provides a summer beach in the town centre. Primarily aimed at young children and families, the centre features a 38-tonne sandpit, dozens of deck chairs, and suspended decorations.

The town council operates an annual fireworks display in early November to celebrate Guy Fawkes Night, in 2018 raising over £2000 in support of West of England MS Therapy Centre and the Stroke Association.

Since 2016, the Willow Brook Centre has hosted the annual Stars of the Stokes Awards to recognise the local heroes in the community featuring special guest celebrities. Awards are issued to a champion carer, a parent in a million, coach of the year, high achievement, a young person of the year and teacher of the year.

Each year the town is adorned with lights to celebrate Christmas. Along with an annual Christmas tree and decorations in the town centre, courtesy of the Willow Brook Centre, one property in Elm Close raises funds each year for St Peters Hospice by decorating their home in 30,000 lights. In 2018, over £3000 was raised.

=== Remembrance service and war memorial ===
A war memorial was created in 2014 by the 1st Bradley Stoke Scout group and the Willow Brook Centre. It is located in the main town square and is a generic memorial dedicated to "all members of our armed forces (and civilians who support them) who have died or suffered due to conflict." It is a simple grey granite pillar with a poppy design at the top and an inscription in the middle (as voted for by nearly 250 local residents) – 'at the going down of the sun and in the morning we will remember them'. There is a Scout Memorial badge (the scout arrowhead surrounded by olive branches and the inscription 'lest we forget') at the base of the pillar. The memorial was designed and crafted by local master mason Alwyn Leek from Bristol and West Memorials. It was created because the town of Bradley Stoke is relatively new (major construction began only in the 1980s) and therefore had no traditional memorial. The aim was to create a focal point to hold remembrance ceremonies for future generations with special involvement from the young people of the town. On 2 August 2014, this memorial was officially dedicated by Dame Janet Trotter, lord lieutenant for Gloucestershire. The dedication ceremony was also a commemoration of the centenary of the First World War and it was attended by members of the 1st Bradley Stoke Scout Group, Royal British Legion, St John's Ambulance Cadets, 1st Bradley Stoke Rainbows, 2nd Patchway Scout Group and Police Cadets. A parade marched from the Jubilee Centre to the town square at the Willow Brook Centre, led by the band of the City of Bristol Pipes and Drums. At the end of the ceremony, the young people present were invited to help light the 100 candles around the memorial to mark the Centenary. The central candle was the official Royal British Legion candle for their 'lights out' campaign. The inaugural Bradley Stoke Remembrance Sunday Ceremony was held on the 9 November 2014, attended by many local uniformed youth groups and approximately 300 members of the public.

Since the creation of the war memorial, an annual Remembrance parade and ceremony is held at the Willowbrook Centre, attended by the Town Mayor, 1st Bradley Stoke Scouts, Trident Explorer Unit, 1st Little Stoke Scout Group, 1st Stokeway Rainbows, 1st Bradley Stoke Rainbows, Brownies and Guides, 2nd Bradley Stoke Brownies, 2nd Stoke Lodge Brownies, a representative from the town council, and the local church vicar.

== Woodland ==
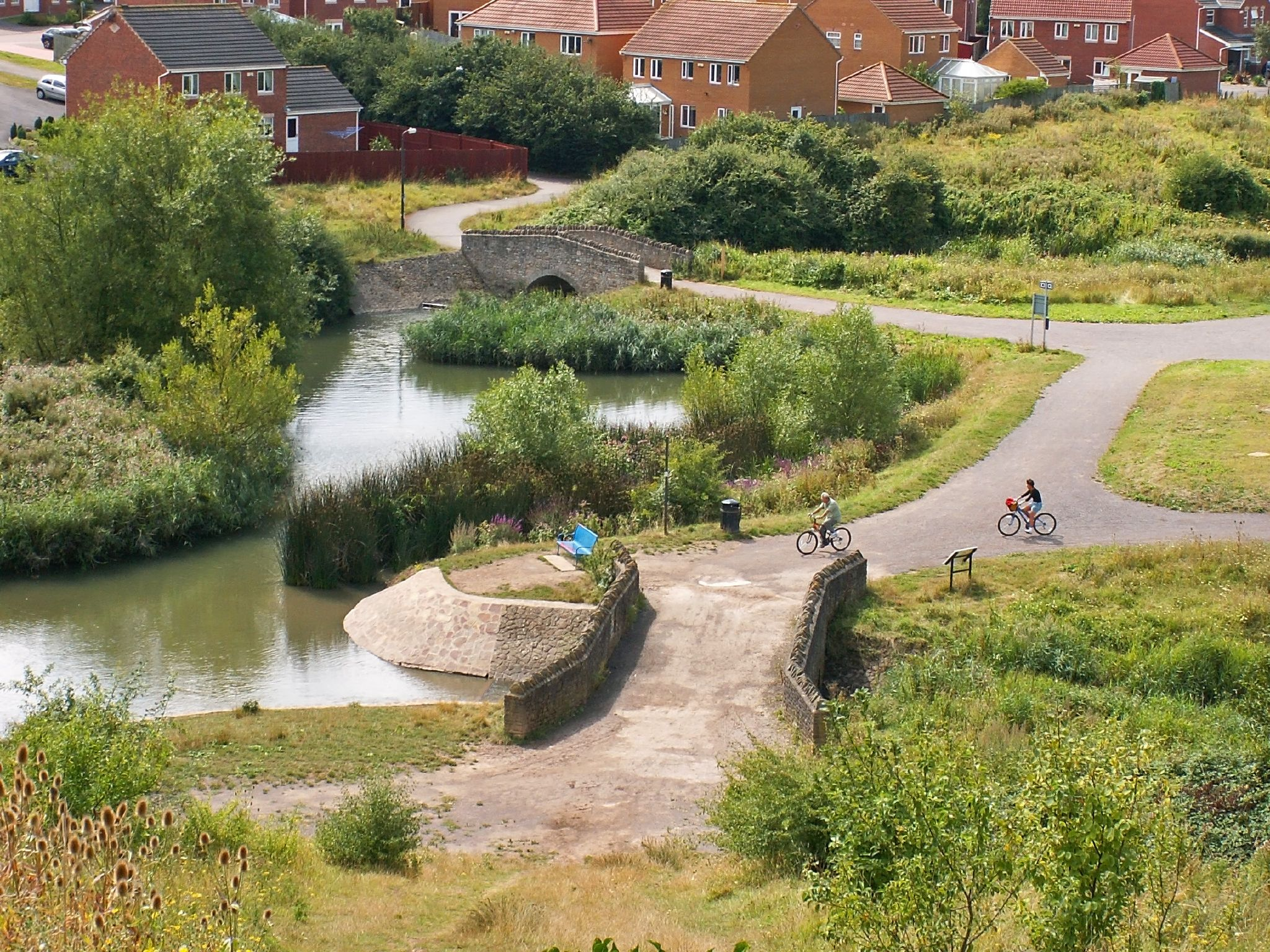
Three Brooks Lake, part of the Frome Valley Relief Sewer adjacent to the M4 motorway

The Woodland area of Bradley Stoke is named Three Brooks nature reserve, an area of approximately 44 hectares (110 acres) that includes bluebell woods, rough grassland, brooks, ponds, and the man-made Three Brooks Lake. The lake, part of the Frome Valley Relief Sewer, is home to many common species of waterfowl including nesting swans. There are also a number of other walks and paths surrounded by small wooded areas connecting various parts of Bradley Stoke. Wild fruit can be found throughout the woodland, namely blackberries, apples, plums and cherries. A community orchard grows in the heart of the woodland.

The local Stokes Art Group (SAG) and the Three Brooks Nature Conservation Group (TBNCG) teamed up for an art project to personify the god of Three Brooks nature reserve. The god was named Trolletheus, named after two rusted supermarket trolleys dredged from the man-made lake. Regular woodland walks and foraging groups are conducted by TBNCG. In May 2019, TBNCG were awarded a grant of £25,000 from Enovert Community Trust to improve accessibility to the woodland through renovations to walkways.

== Sport ==
The Bradley Stoke Bowls Club opened in 2010 at the Baileys Court Activity Centre.

Bradley Stoke Cricket Club formed in September 1990 and became the founder users of the pavilion in Baileys Court Road under the management of the Bradley Stoke Town Council (now part of the Baileys Court Activity Centre). The club joined the Bristol and District Cricket Association (B&D) in 1991, played its first game in 1992, won the Tony Hitch T/20 Trophy in 2019, and was promoted to the West of England Premier League in 2021.

The town's local football teams are Bradley Stoke Town FC and Bradley Stoke Youth FC.

There is a well-lit modern concrete skate park located at the Bradley Stoke Active Leisure Centre, under the ownership and supervision of the Bradley Stoke Town Council.

The town hosts a 10 km running event, with locals competing against each other to run a course across the length of the town.

A Parkrun event has been hosted on the Three Brooks Local Nature Reserve since July 2024

=== Tennis ===
Tennis lessons, games and events are played at the Jubilee Centre on Savages Wood Road.

=== Martial arts ===
Numerous Martial arts and fitness clubs provide classes within the town teaching Judo, Taekwondo, Bushido, Kung-fu and kickboxing.

== Media ==
=== Printed ===
Bradley Stoke's news and media publications include Bradley Stoke Matters and The Bradley Stoke Journal.

Bradley Stoke Matters is a free community magazine and website which started up in 2005, following local news and events. The free magazine is delivered quarterly to every home in Bradley Stoke.

The Bradley Stoke Journal is a free interactive community news website since 2007, following local news and events. From 2013 the free magazine was delivered monthly to every home in Bradley Stoke. The magazine ceased printed publication in May 2022, but the website and social media channels continued. The Bradley Stoke Journal Website entered retirement in January 2025 with its existing content being archived.

=== Radio ===
Bradley Stoke Radio, the local community radio station, broadcasts over the internet via webcasts and on 103.4 MHz FM. Live broadcasts are regularly held during local community events, in Willow Brook Shopping Centre's town square, and at local festivals, featuring live singers and commentary directly from the events.

Bradley Stoke receives BBC Radio Bristol on 94.9 MHz FM, Heart West on 96.3 MHz FM and Greatest Hits Radio Bristol & The South West on 107.2 MHz FM.

=== Television ===
Bradley Stoke is covered by and has featured on the local television channel Bristol TV, formerly known as Made in Bristol TV.

The regional television services are BBC West and ITV West Country.

== Crime ==
Bradley Stoke is served by Avon and Somerset Constabulary. Bradley Stoke Town Council funds a dedicated police officer for the town. There is a local police beat surgery office located in the Willow Brook Centre Avon and Somerset Constabulary were criticised in early 2019 for having no active Police Community Support Officers (PCSO). A police presence has since been reinstated.

Bradley Stoke benefits from a low crime rate compared to other areas of Bristol. However, in 2018, the crime rate reached its highest level for 5 years with over 100 crimes reported in the month of June. The supermarket, leisure centre, petrol filling station and nearby pub were hotspots for the most frequent crimes Incidents involving arson, threats towards children and multiple counts of indecent exposure were reported in the area.

Numerous acts of vandalism were reported around the Three Brooks Nature Reserve over the May Bank Holiday weekend in 2019. Incidents included two counts of theft, destruction of wildlife housing, damage to the Three Brooks Local Nature Reserve signage and installations. An incident that occurred involving a community project to decorate roundabouts involved intoxicated individuals stealing an ornamental animal. The animal was returned but later damaged in a separate incident involving a car driving over the roundabout.

The Avon and Somerset police crime statistics record that between May 2018 and April 2019 at least 900 crimes were reported in the Bradley Stoke area. The crimes included 230 reports of anti-social behaviour (25.56%) and 256 reports of violence and sexual offences (28.44%). Other offences included bicycle theft, burglary, criminal damage and arson, drugs offences, possession of weapons, public order offences, robbery, shoplifting and vehicle crime.

== Twin cities ==
Bradley Stoke is twinned with Champs-sur-Marne, France located in the Paris suburbs.
