= Filton and Bradley Stoke =

UK Parliament constituency (since 2010)

Coordinates: 51.517°N 2.538°W

- County constituency for the House of Commons
- Interactive map of boundaries from 2024
- Boundary of Filton and Bradley Stoke in South West England
- County: Gloucestershire
- Electorate: 73,598 (2023)
- Major settlements: Almondsbury, Bradley Stoke, Stoke Gifford, Filton, Downend, Winterbourne

Current constituency
- Created: 2010
- Member of Parliament: Claire Hazelgrove (Labour)
- Seats: One
- Created from: Bristol North West, Northavon, Kingswood

Filton and Bradley Stoke is a constituency (Note: A county constituency (for the purposes of election expenses and type of returning officer).) in Gloucestershire represented in the House of Commons of the UK Parliament since 2024 by Claire Hazelgrove from the Labour Party. (Note: As with all constituencies, the constituency elects one Member of Parliament (MP) by the first past the post system of election at least every five years.) As the name suggests, major settlements include Filton, Bradley Stoke, as well as Almondsbury, Stoke Gifford, Downend and Winterbourne. Filton and Bradley Stoke hosts an electorate of 73,598 (2023).

== Constituency profile ==
Filton and Bradley Stoke is a suburban constituency located in Gloucestershire. It lies on the outskirts of Bristol and covers the suburbs to its north-east including Filton, Bradley Stoke, Patchway, Stoke Gifford, Downend, Emersons Green and the outlying village of Winterbourne. Filton is the site of Bristol Filton Airport which closed in 2012 but continues to host numerous aerospace businesses including Rolls-Royce, Airbus and BAE Systems. Stoke Gifford hosts the main campus of the University of the West of England, which has more than 30,000 students. The constituency is generally affluent with low levels of deprivation. House prices are similar to the national average.

In general, residents of the constituency are young and well-educated. Rates of professional employment and household income are high. White people made up 85% of the population at the 2021 census, a similar proportion to the country as a whole. At the local council, Filton and Emersons Green are represented by Labour Party councillors, Bradley Stoke and Winterbourne by Conservatives and the area around the university by Liberal Democrats. Voters in the constituency are estimated to have been evenly-split on the question of European Union membership with 50% voting for each option in the 2016 referendum.

== History ==
Map of boundaries 2010–2024

The seat was created by the Boundary Commission for the 2010 general election. The seat was formed by taking parts of the Bristol North West, Kingswood, and Northavon constituencies.

== Boundaries ==
2010–2024: The District of South Gloucestershire wards of Almondsbury, Bradley Stoke Central & Stoke Lodge, Bradley Stoke North, Bradley Stoke South, Downend, Filton, Frenchay & Stoke Park, Patchway, Pilning and Severn Beach, Staple Hill, Stoke Gifford and Winterbourne, all in the South Gloucestershire (unitary) district.

2024–present: The District of South Gloucestershire wards of Bradley Stoke North, Bradley Stoke South, Charlton & Cribbs, Emersons Green, Filton, Frenchay & Downend, Patchway Coniston, Stoke Gifford, Stoke Park & Cheswick, and Winterbourne.

Further to the 2023 Periodic Review of Westminster constituencies which came into effect for the 2024 general election, the seat was subject to moderate boundary changes, involving the gain of parts of the abolished Kingswood constituency, including the community of Emersons Green. This was offset by the loss of the Bristol Channel hinterland including Severn Beach to an enlarged Thornbury and Yate, and Staple Hill and Mangotsfield, which moved into the re-established Bristol North East constituency.

== Members of Parliament ==
Election	Member	Party
2010	Jack Lopresti	Conservative
2024	Claire Hazelgrove	Labour

== Elections ==
=== Elections in the 2020s ===
General election 2024: Filton and Bradley Stoke
Party	Candidate	Votes	%	±%
Labour	Claire Hazelgrove	22,905	45.5	+9.7
Conservative	Jack Lopresti	12,905	25.6	−25.4
Reform	Stephen Burge	6,819	13.5	New
Green	James Nelson	4,142	8.2	+5.5
Liberal Democrats	Benet Allen	3,596	7.1	−2.9
Majority		10,000	19.9	N/A
Turnout		50,367	65.0	−5.1
Labour gain from Conservative		Swing	+17.6	

=== Elections in the 2010s ===
General election 2019: Filton and Bradley Stoke
Party	Candidate	Votes	%	±%
Conservative	Jack Lopresti	26,293	48.9	−1.1
Labour	Mhairi Threlfall	20,647	38.4	−3.3
Liberal Democrats	Louise Harris	4,992	9.3	+3.3
Green	Jenny Vernon	1,563	2.9	+0.6
Citizens Movement Party UK	Elaine Hardwick	257	0.5	New
Majority		5,646	10.5	+2.2
Turnout		53,752	72.6	+2.4
Conservative hold		Swing	+1.1	

General election 2017: Filton and Bradley Stoke
Party	Candidate	Votes	%	±%
Conservative	Jack Lopresti	25,339	50.0	+3.3
Labour	Naomi Rylatt	21,149	41.7	+15.1
Liberal Democrats	Eva Fielding	3,052	6.0	−1.3
Green	Diana Warner	1,162	2.3	−2.3
Majority		4,190	8.3	−11.8
Turnout		50,702	70.2	+1.3
Conservative hold		Swing	-5.9	

General election 2015: Filton and Bradley Stoke
Party	Candidate	Votes	%	±%
Conservative	Jack Lopresti	22,920	46.7	+5.9
Labour	Ian Boulton	13,082	26.6	+0.2
UKIP	Ben Walker	7,261	14.8	+11.7
Liberal Democrats	Pete Bruce	3,581	7.3	−18.0
Green	Diana Warner	2,257	4.6	+3.7
Majority		9,838	20.1	+5.8
Turnout		49,101	68.9	−1.1
Conservative hold		Swing	+3.1	

General election 2010: Filton and Bradley Stoke
Party	Candidate	Votes	%	±%
Conservative	Jack Lopresti	19,686	40.8	+5.3
Labour	Ian Boulton	12,772	26.4	−7.4
Liberal Democrats	Peter Tyzack	12,197	25.3	−3.1
UKIP	John Knight	1,506	3.1	+0.9
BNP	David Scott	1,328	2.7	New
Green	Jon Lucas	441	0.9	New
Christian	Ruth Johnson	199	0.4	New
No label	None of the Above Zero (Note: None of the Above Zero was a candidate at the 2010 general election. Previously known as Eric Mutch, he changed his name by deed poll to stand under that name. As candidates are listed by surname first he appeared on the ballot paper as "Zero, None of the Above," in effect giving voters a none of the above – if elected he promised to resign immediately. He came last with 172 votes.)	172	0.4	New
Majority		6,914	14.3	+12.7
Turnout		48,301	70.0	+7.5
Conservative win (new seat)				

== See also ==
- List of parliamentary constituencies in Avon
- Terry Marsh – who changed his name to "None of the Above X" to stand in the 2010 general election
