= Police aviation =

Use of aircraft in police operations

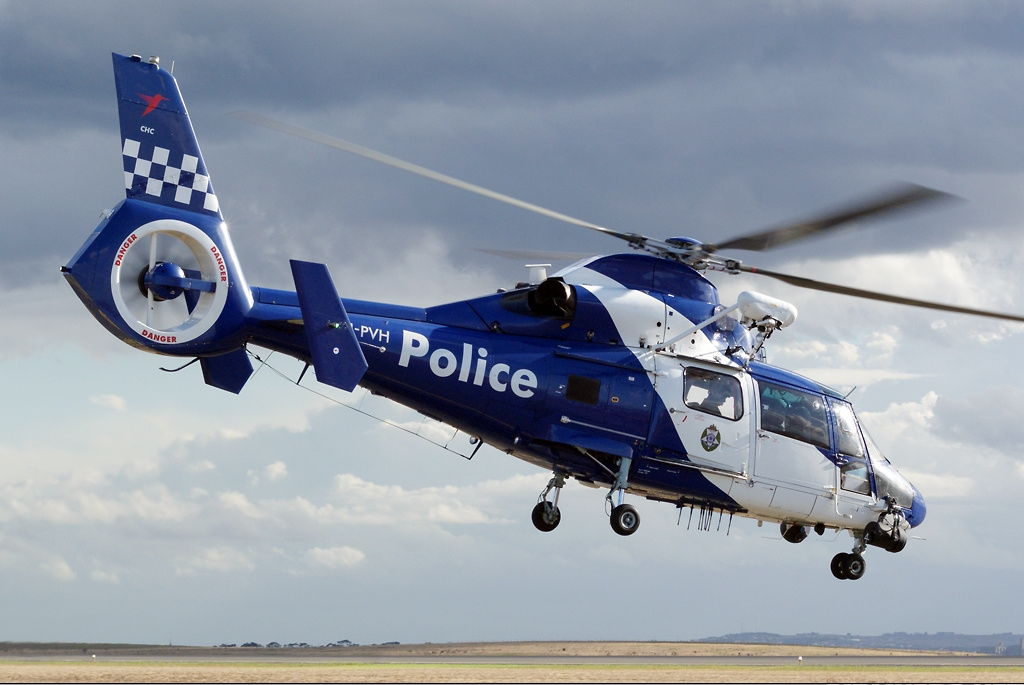
A Eurocopter AS365 Dauphin operated by the Victoria Police Air Wing

Police aviation, or police helicopter, is the use of aircraft in police operations. Police services commonly use aircraft for traffic control, ground support, search and rescue, high-speed car pursuits, observation, air patrol and control of large-scale public events and/or public order incidents. They may employ rotary-wing aircraft, fixed-wing aircraft, nonrigid-wing aircraft or lighter-than-air aircraft. In some major cities, police rotary-wing aircraft are also used as air transportation for personnel belonging to police tactical units. In large, sparsely populated areas, fixed-wing aircraft are sometimes used to transport personnel and equipment.

== History ==
The first police aviation department was established in New York City. Fixed-wing aircraft have generally been replaced by more versatile rotary-wing aircraft since the late 1940s. However, fixed-wing aircraft are still used in some missions, such as border patrol, as their higher speed and greater operating altitude allow larger areas to be covered.

In 1921, the British airship R33 was used to help the police with traffic control around horse racing events at Epsom and Ascot.

A large mural on the side of St. George's Town Hall in the East End of London depicting the 1936 Battle of Cable Street public order incident includes the police autogyro, that was present during the incident, overhead.

The first police aviation unit in China, the Wuhan Municipal Public Security Bureau Aviation Squad was established in 1993 in the Wuhan municipal public security bureau. As of 2011, China operates a total of 20 police aviation units, with 35 police helicopters and 60 pilots.

== Rotary-wing aircraft ==
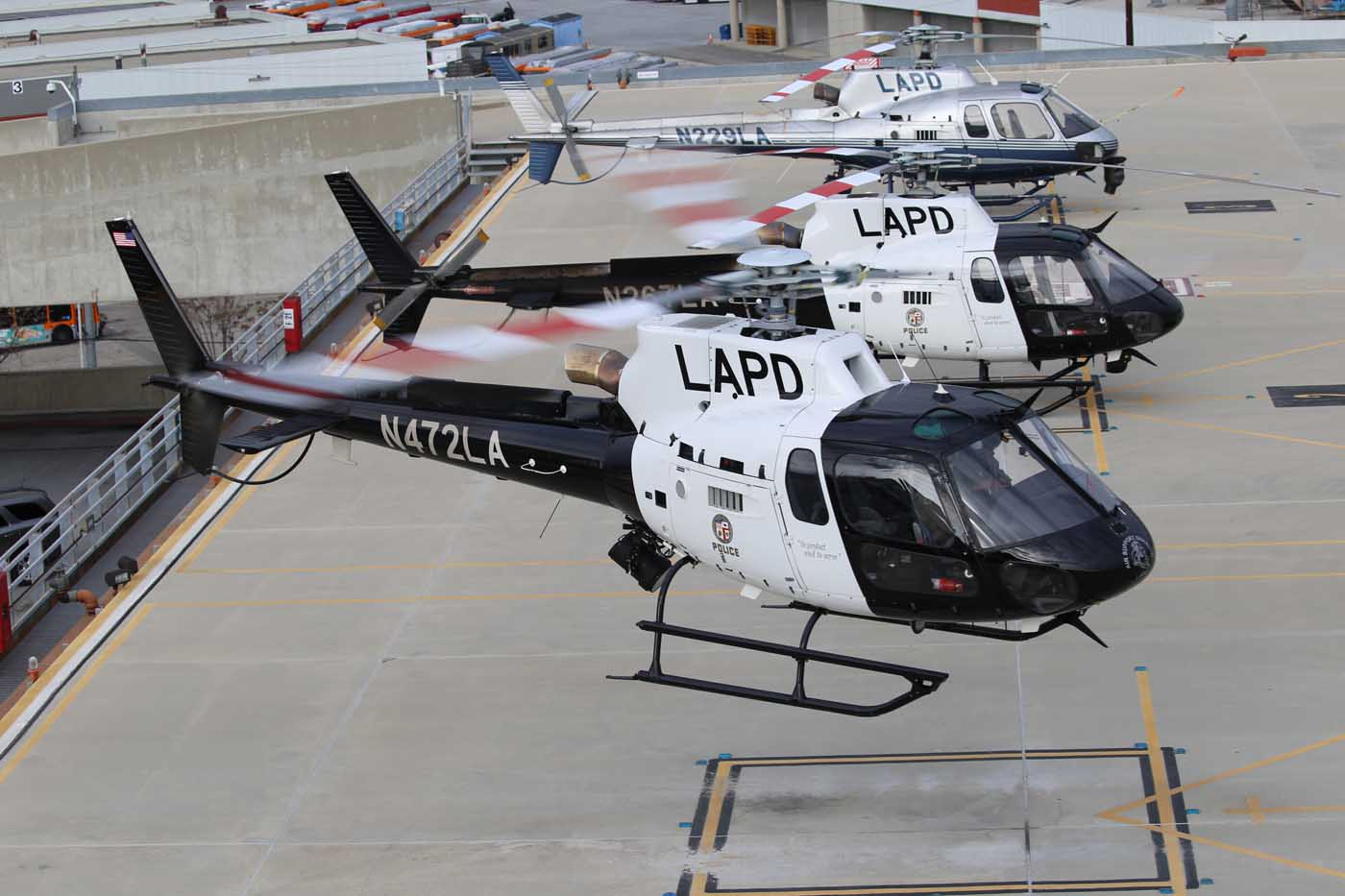
Eurocopter AS350 Écureuil helicopters operated by the Los Angeles Police Department Air Support Division

The most common form of police rotary-wing aircraft is the helicopter, but other types of rotary-wing aircraft such as autogyros are also used. The Groen Hawk 4 autogyro was used during the 2002 Winter Olympics in Salt Lake City, Utah.

Police rotary-wing aircraft are sometimes equipped to perform multiple functions, or are designed so that equipment can be changed quickly when required for divergent roles. For example, a rotary-wing aircraft could be used for search-and-rescue, and then as an air ambulance. They have also been used to perform search and rescue, notably in China after Tropical Storm Bilis.

Police forces sometimes use military surplus rotary-wing aircraft, such as the Bell UH-1 Huey. Some policing organisations, such as the Policía Federal in Mexico, acquire new military rotary-wing aircraft such as the Sikorsky UH-60 Black Hawk. However, most buy civilian rotary-wing aircraft directly from major aircraft companies or lease them from specialty suppliers.

The use of police helicopters by the Los Angeles Police Department has been criticized for causing excessive noise and pollution and harming the well-being of community members.

== Fixed-wing and nonrigid-wing aircraft ==
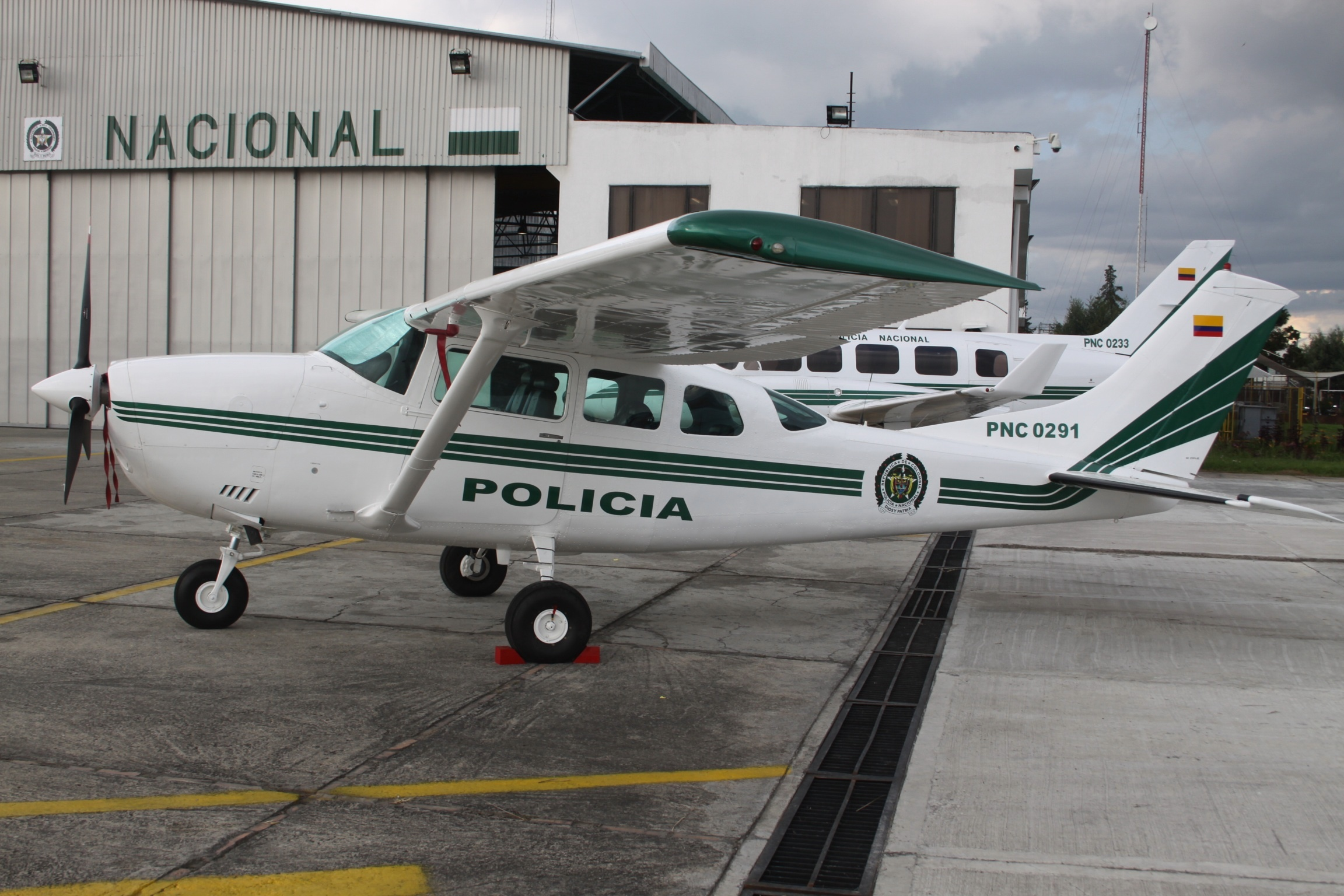
A Cessna 206 and Piper PA-31 Navajo operated by the National Police of Colombia

Some police air units also use fixed-wing aircraft, which allow higher and quieter surveillance, making it less likely that suspects will become aware they are being watched. A few police air units, such as the Northern Territory Police in Australia, use only fixed-wing aircraft. The use of fixed-wing aircraft also allows for longer flying times and incurs lower running costs. Fixed-wing aircraft are also used to transport prisoners, with the Justice Prisoner Air Transportation System (nicknamed "Con Air") perhaps being the largest example of this use. Fixed-wing aircraft are also used to provide regular police patrols in remote communities and to transport investigators to remote crime scenes. Light-sport aircraft and powered parachutes can sometimes be used to provide a cost-effective replacement for helicopters in the observation platform role.

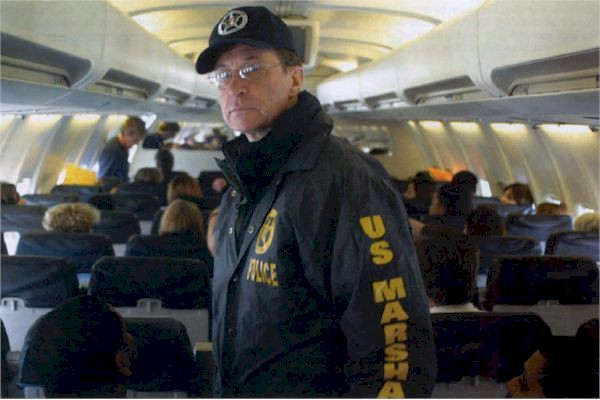
A U.S. Marshal on a "JPATS" flight used to transport prisoners

The Edgley Optica was a British fixed-wing aircraft built for observation use and was used by the Hampshire Constabulary as an alternative to rotary-wing aircraft. The Britten-Norman Defender is used by the Greater Manchester Police, the Police Service of Northern Ireland and the Garda Síochána. The FBI deployed a Britten-Norman Defender for electronic aerial surveillance at the Branch Davidian compound during the Waco siege in 1993. In Greater London, the Metropolitan Police Service has, for a number of years, reportedly been secretly using Cessna aircraft that have been fitted with surveillance equipment capable of intercepting mobile telephone calls and listening in on conversations.

== Lighter-than-air aircraft ==
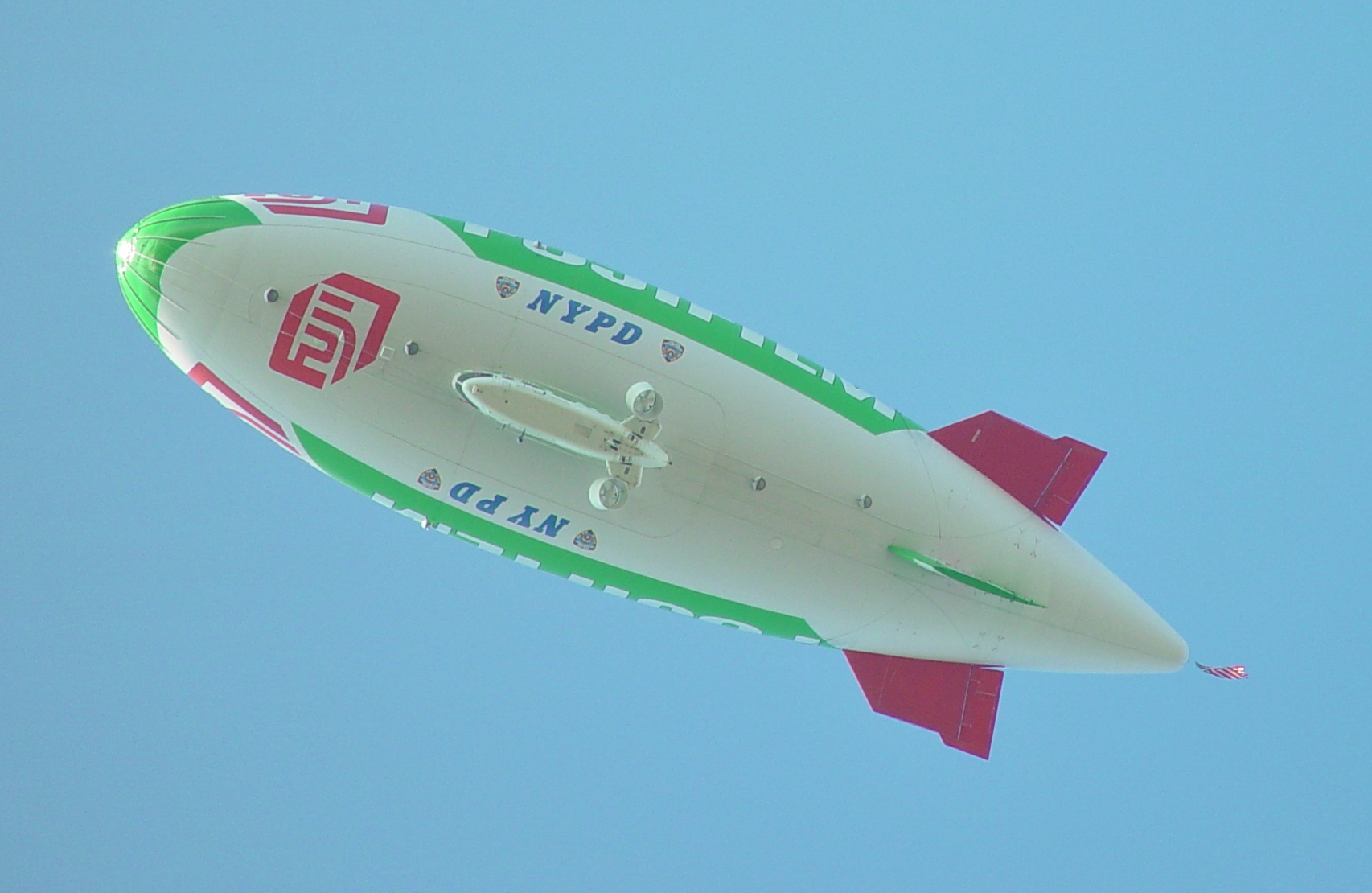
A Skyship 600 used for observation by the New York City Police Department during the 2004 Republican National Convention

Police blimps were used to patrol the sky during the 2004 Republican National Convention, the 1996 Atlanta Olympic Games and the 2004 Athens Olympic Games. The blimp Santos-Dumont, named for Alberto Santos-Dumont, operates in the Caribbean for the Special Anti-Crime Unit of Trinidad & Tobago (SAUTT), providing security surveillance. During April 2009, this blimp provided aerial surveillance of the 5th Summit of the Americas in Port-of-Spain. Greater Manchester Police began trial operations of a blimp in 2010 to provide surveillance for major events, which would be a cheaper alternative to the use of a helicopter in the long term. However, the blimp was only used on 18 occasions because of weather-related operational problems.

== Unmanned aerial vehicles ==
Police in some areas have started using unmanned aerial vehicles, or drones, for surveillance operations. Unmanned aerial vehicles come in both fixed-wing and rotary-wing types.

== List of police aviation units ==
=== Active units ===
Australia

- New South Wales Police Force Aviation Command
- Queensland Police Service (operated through Surf Life Saving Queensland Aviation)
- South Australia Police
- Victoria Police Air Wing
- Western Australia Police Air Wing

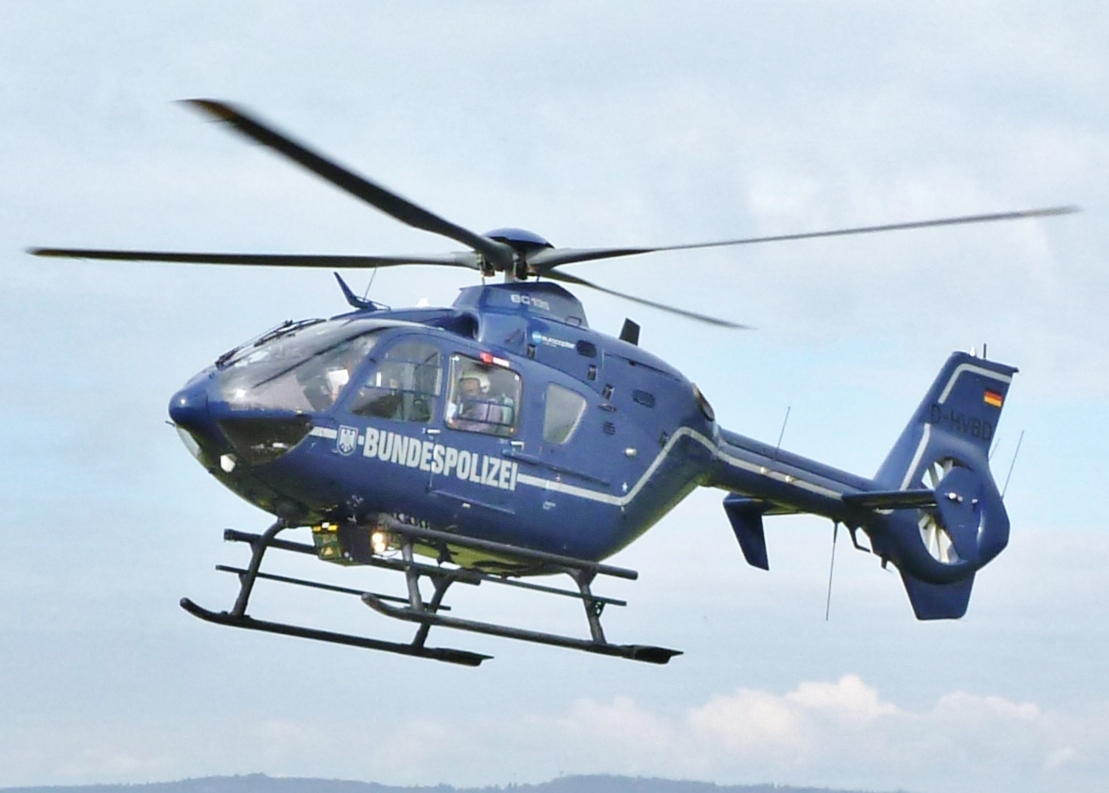
A Eurocopter EC145 operated by the German Federal Police

Austria

- Air Police (Flugpolizei) of the Directorate General for Public Security

Canada

- Calgary Police Service - HAWCS
- Durham Regional Police Service - Air Support Unit
- Edmonton Police Service - Flight Operations
- Ontario Provincial Police - Joint Air Support Unit
- Regina Police Service - Aerial Support Unit
- Royal Canadian Mounted Police - Air Services branch
- Saskatoon Police Service - Air Support Unit
- Quebec Provincial Police - Air Operations
- Winnipeg Police Service - Flight Operations Unit
- York Regional Police - Air Support Unit

China

- Beijing Municipal Public Security Bureau Police Aviation Unit
- Wuhan Municipal Public Security Bureau Aviation Squad
- Guangdong Provincial Public Security Department Police Aviation Unit
- Shanghai Municipal Public Security Bureau Police Aviation Force
- 1st Mobile Corps Helicopter Detachment
- 2nd Mobile Corps Helicopter Detachment

Hong Kong

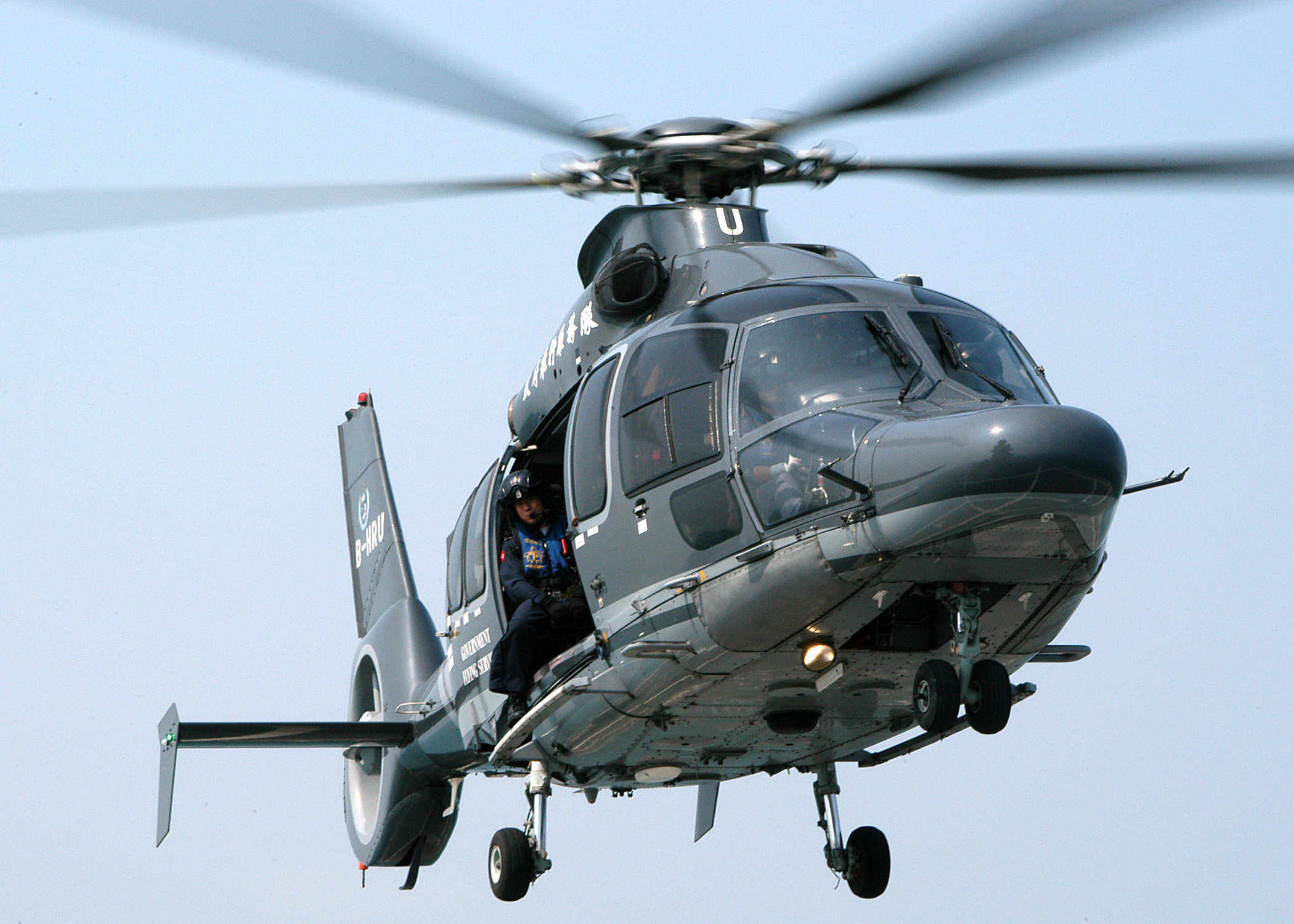
A Eurocopter EC155 operated by the Government Flying Service

- Hong Kong Government Flying Service

Cyprus

- Cyprus Police Aviation Unit

France

- National Gendarmerie Forces aériennes de la Gendarmerie

Germany

- Federal Police - Bundespolizei-Flugdienst (BPOLFLD)
- Baden-Württemberg State Police - Polizeihubschrauberstaffel
- Bavarian State Police - Polizeihubschrauberstaffel
- Berlin State Police - Polizeihubschrauberstaffel
- Brandenburg State Police - Polizeihubschrauberstaffel
- Hamburg State Police - Polizeihubschrauberstaffel
- Hesse State Police - Polizeifliegerstaffel
- Mecklenburg-Vorpommern state maritime police, the Wasserschutzpolizei - Polizeihubschrauberstaffel
- North Rhine-Westphalia State Police - Polizeifliegerstaffel
- Rhineland-Palatinate State Police - Polizeihubschrauberstaffel

Indonesia

- Indonesian National Police Marine and Air Corps - Air Police Directorate

Iran

- Iranian Police Aviation

Ireland

- Garda Air Support Unit

Japan

- Tokyo Metropolitan Police Department Aviation Unit

Malaysia

- Royal Malaysian Police Air Wing Unit

Mexico

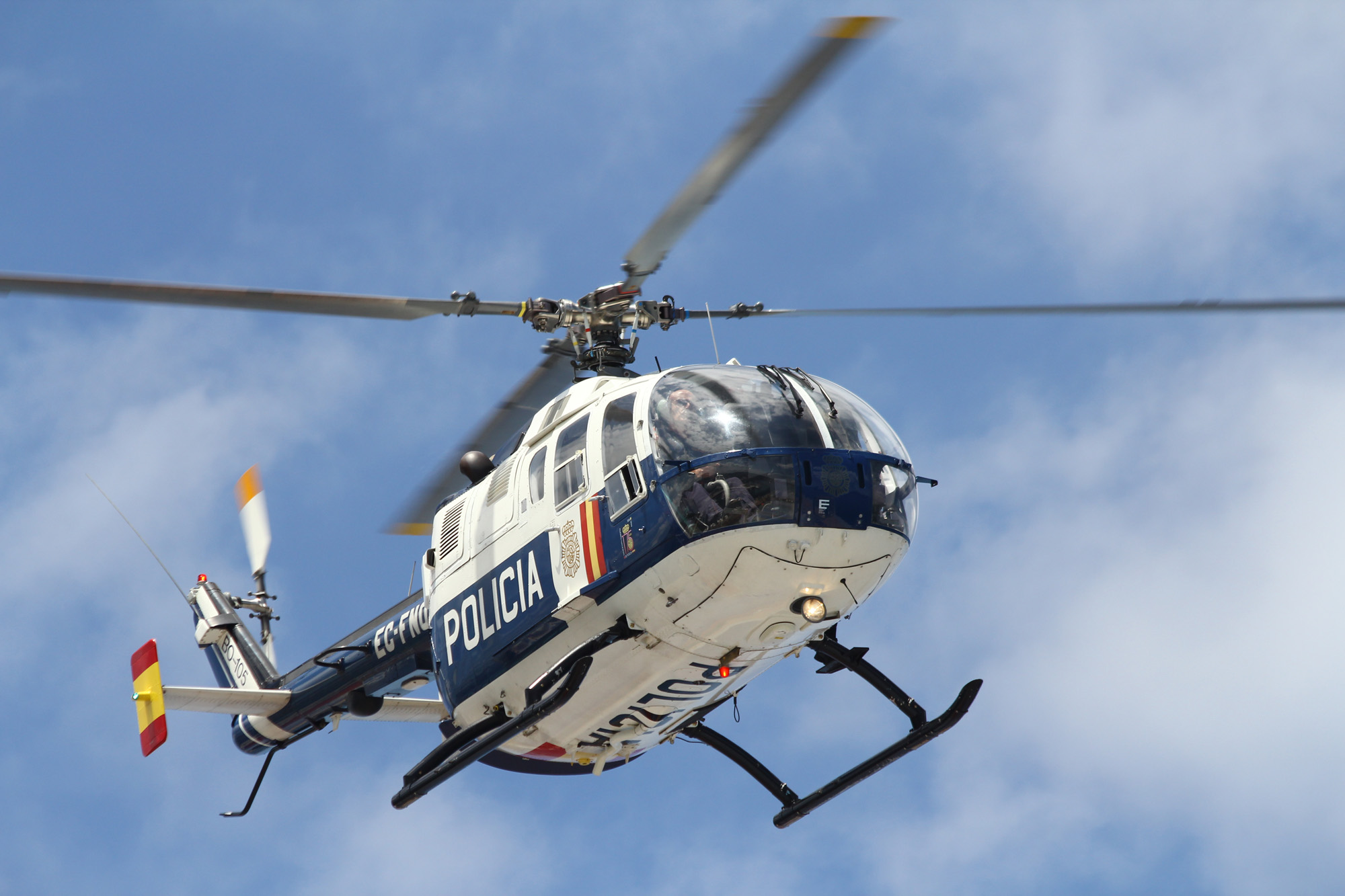
An MBB Bo 105 operated by the Spanish National Police Corps

- Mexico City Police Condor Group

Netherlands

- Police Aviation Service

New Zealand

- Eagle Helicopter Unit

North Macedonia

- Macedonian police helicopter unit

Oman

- Royal Oman Police - Police Aviation Directorate

Panama

- National Aeronaval Service

Philippines

- Philippine National Police Air Unit

Romania

- General Inspectorate of Aviation

Saudi Arabia

- General Directorate of Public Security Aviation Command

Serbia

- Police of Serbia Helicopter Unit

South Africa

- South African Police Service Air Wing

South Korea

- National Police Agency Aviation Division

Taiwan

- National Airborne Service Corps

Uganda

- Uganda Police Force Air Wing

United Kingdom

- National Police Air Service
- Police Scotland Air Support Unit
- Police Service of Northern Ireland Air Support Unit

United States of America

Many local, state, and federal US law enforcement agencies operate helicopters, and some operate fixed-wing aircraft.

Federal agencies

- Justice Prisoner Air Transportation System Air Operations Division
- State Department Air Wing
- United States Fish and Wildlife Service Branch of Aviation Management
- United States Park Police Aviation Unit

Alabama

- Alabama Law Enforcement Agency Aviation Unit
- Dale County Sheriff's Office Aviation Unit: 2 Bell OH-58 Kiowa helicopters, 1 MD 600N helicopter, and 1 Cessna Skylane 182RG fixed-wing aircraft
- Etowah County Sheriff's Office Aviation Unit: 1 Bell OH-58C helicopter
- Oxford Police Department's Aviation Support Unit: 1 MD Helicopters MD 500
- Shelby County Sheriff's Office Air Support Unit: 1 Bell TH-67 Creek helicopter, 1 Bell 206 JetRanger helicopter, and 1 OH-58 Kiowa helicopter
- Tuscaloosa Police Department Air Patrol Division: 4 Bell OH-58 Kiowa helicopters

Alaska

Agency	Unit	Rotary Assets	Fixed-Wing Assets
Alaska Department of Public Safety	Aircraft Section	Eurocopter AS350 Squirrel Robinson R44	Cessna 185 Skywagon Cessna 208 Caravan Piper PA-18 Super Cub Beechcraft Super King Air

Arizona

Agency	Unit	Rotary Assets	Fixed-Wing Assets
Arizona Department of Public Safety	Aviation Bureau	3 Bell 429 GlobalRanger 2 Bell 407	2 King Air
Mesa Police Department	Air Support Unit	3 MD Helicopters MD 500	1 Cessna 172 Skyhawk 1 Cessna 210 Centurion
Peoria Police Department	Aviation Unit	1 Bell 505	
Phoenix Police Department	Air Support Unit	1 Agusta A109E 5 Eurocopter AS350B3 Ecureuil	1 Cessna 172 Skyhawk 1 Cessna 182 Skylane 1 Cessna 210 Centurion 1 Pilatus PC-12NG

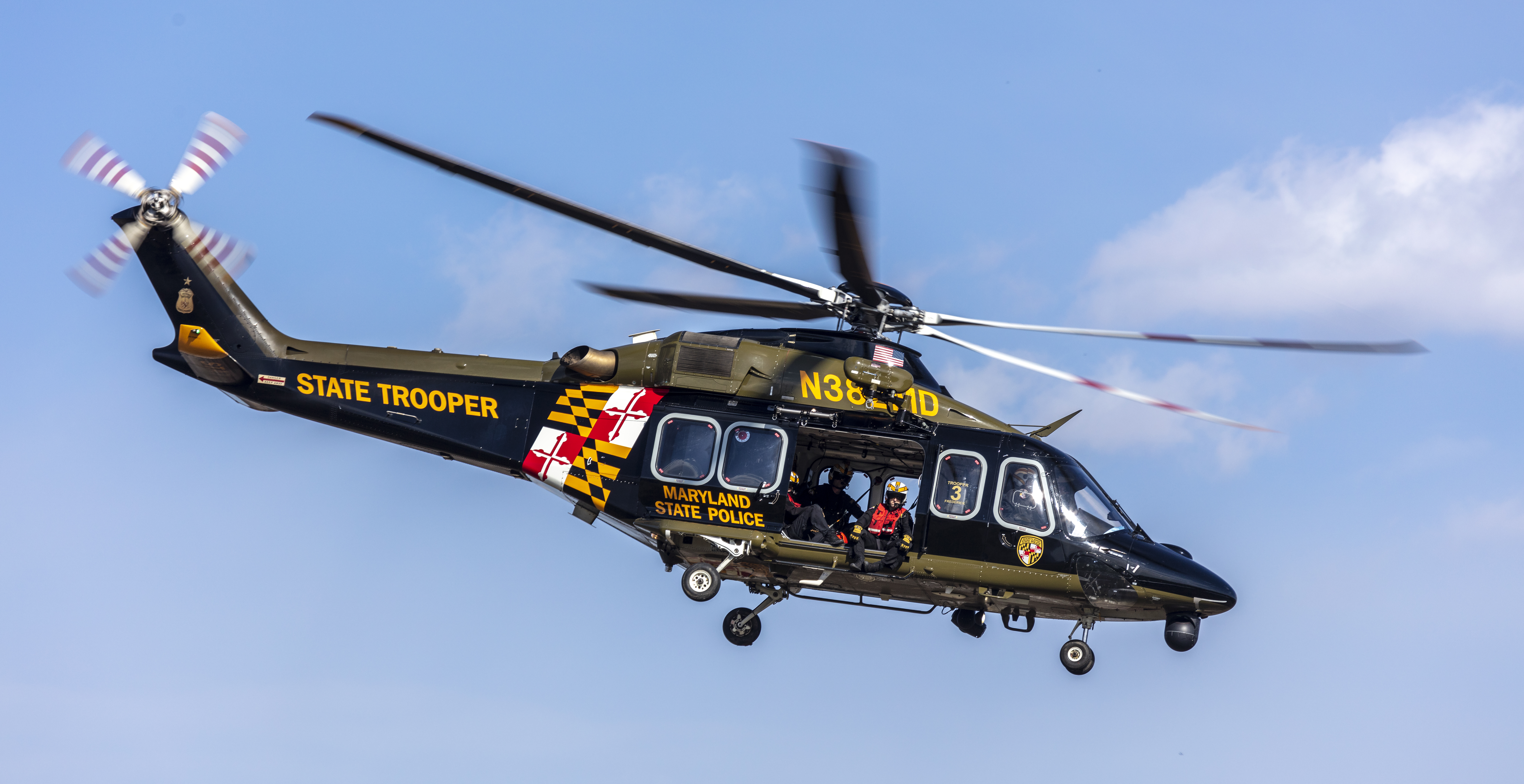
An AgustaWestland AW139 operated by the Maryland State Police

Arkansas

- Arkansas State Police Air Support Unit: 1 Bell 407, 1 Cessna 206, and 1 Beechcraft B200 King Air
- Baxter County Sheriff's Office Aviation Unit: 1 Bell OH-58
- Benton County Sheriff's Office Aviation Unit: 2 Bell OH-58A helicopters
- Little Rock Police Department Aviation Unit
- Mississippi County Aviation Unit: 2 Bell OH-58A helicopters

California

- California Highway Patrol Office of Air Operations
- LAPD Air Support Division
- Los Angeles County Sheriff's Aero Bureau

Colorado

- Denver Police Department Air Support Unit

Connecticut

- New Milford Police Aviation Unit

Delaware

- Delaware State Police Aviation Section

District of Columbia

- Metropolitan Police Air Support Unit

Florida

- Marion County Sheriff's Office Aviation Unit - at least four helicopters

Georgia

- Atlanta Police Department Helicopter Unit: 3 MD530F helicopters
- Clayton County Sheriff's Office Aviation Unit
- Dekalb County Ariel Support Unit: 2 Eurocopter AS-350 helicopters
- Georgia Department of Natural Resources Aviation Unit: 3 Bell 407 helicopters
- Georgia State Patrol Aviation Division

Hawaii

- Honolulu Police Department Helicopter Section

Idaho

- Kootenai County Sheriff's Office Regional Air Support

Illinois

- Chicago Police Department Marine and Helicopter Unit
- Illinois State Police Air Operations Bureau

Indiana

- Fort Wayne Police Department Air Support Unit
- Indiana State Police Aviation Section: 3 helicopters, and 2 fixed-winged planes
- Lake County Sheriff's Office Aviation Unit: 1 Eurocopter EC-120 helicopter, 2 OH-58 helicopters, and 1 UH-1H helicopters

Iowa

- Cedar Rapids Police Department
- Iowa State Patrol Air Wing Unit

Kansas

- Kansas Highway Patrol Troop T - Aircraft: 1 Bell 407 helicopter, 1 Airbus H125 helicopter, 1 Cessna 182 RG fixed-wing aircraft, 3 Cessna 206 fixed-wing aircraft, and a 2001 King Air 350 for Executive transport for state officials

Maine

- Maine State Police Air Wing - 2 Cessna 183 fixed-wing aircraft
- Maine Forest Service Forest Protection Aviation Branch - 2 Bell 407 helicopters, 5 UH-1H (Huey) helicopters, and 3 fixed-wing aircraft
- Maine Marine Patrol - 1 Kodiak 100 fixed-wing aircraft
- Maine Warden Service Aviation Division - 3 fixed-wing aircraft

Maryland

- Maryland State Police Aviation Command
- Anne Arundel County Police Aviation Unit
- Baltimore Police Aviation Unit
- Baltimore County Police Department: 3 AS350B3 helicopters
- Prince George's County Police Aviation Section

Massachusetts

- Massachusetts State Police Air Wing

Nebraska

- Nebraska State Patrol Aviation Support Division: 1 Bell 407 helicopter, 3 Cessna T206H Turbo Stationair fixed-wing aircraft, and 1 Piper Super Cub
- Omaha Police Department Air Support Unit: 2 Bell 206 helicopters

Nevada

- Las Vegas Metropolitan Police Department Air Support Unit

New Hampshire

- New Hampshire State Police Special Enforcement Unit (SEU)

New Jersey

- New Jersey State Police - Special Operations Section - Aviation Bureau

New York

- New York State Police Aviation Unit
- Erie County Sheriff's Office Aviation Unit
- New York City Police Department Aviation Unit
- New York City Department of Environmental Protection Police Aviation Unit
- Nassau County Police Department Aviation Unit
- Onondaga County Sheriff's Office Aviation Unit
- Suffolk County Police Department Aviation Section
- Westchester County Police Aviation Unit

North Carolina

- North Carolina State Bureau of Investigation Air Wing
- North Carolina Highway Patrol Aviation
- North Carolina Marine Patrol Aviation
- Brunswick County Sheriff's Office Aviation Unit
- Robeson County Sheriff's Office Aviation Division
- Wayne County Sheriff's Office Aviation Unit

North Dakota

- North Dakota Highway Patrol Aircraft

Ohio

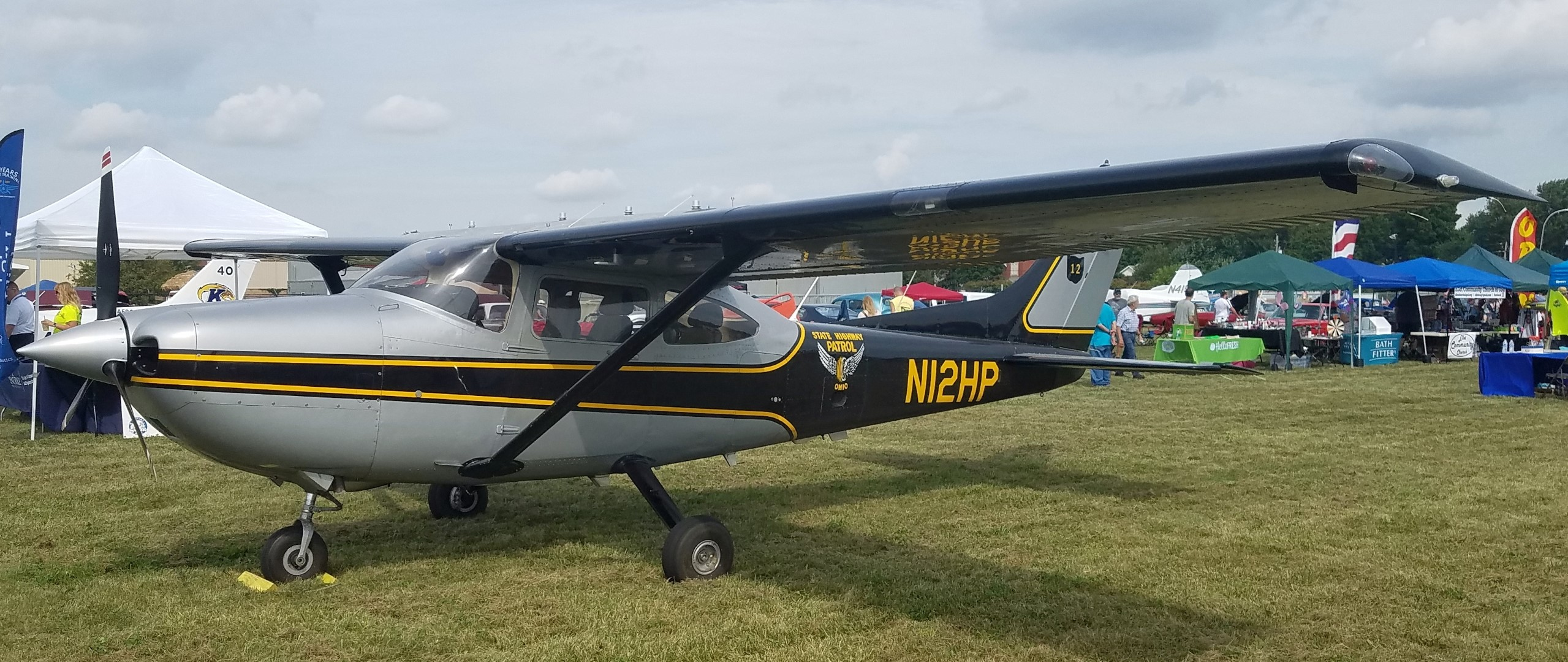
A Cessna 182 Skylane operated by the Ohio State Highway Patrol

- Ohio State Highway Patrol Aviation Section
- Cleveland Police Department Aviation Unit

Oklahoma

- Oklahoma City Police Department Air Support Unit: 2 Airbus H125 helicopters
- Oklahoma Highway Patrol Troop O - Aircraft: 9 fixed-wing aircraft, 2 helicopters
- Tulsa Police Department Air Support Unit: 1 Airbus AS 3503B

Oregon

- Oregon State Police Aviation Unit - four fixed-wing Cessnas
- Clackamas County Sheriff Air Support Unit - one Cessna 182
- Portland Police Air Support Unit

Pennsylvania

- Pennsylvania State Police Bureau of Emergency and Special Operations Aviation Units
- Philadelphia Police Aviation Unit

Puerto Rico

- Puerto Rico Joint Forces of Rapid Action
- Puerto Rico Natural Resources Ranger Corps Aerial Patrol

South Dakota

- South Dakota Highway Patrol Aviation Unit - One Cessna T206

Texas

- Texas Department of Public Safety Aircraft Section

Utah

- Utah Department of Public Safety Aero Bureau (helicopters)

Virginia

- Virginia State Police 3 airplanes, 7 helicopters
- Fairfax County Police Department Helicopter Division (two helicopters)
- Henrico County Metro Aviation Unit
- Virginia Beach Police Department Special Operations Aviation Unit

Washington

- Washington State Patrol: Special Operations Division: Aviation Section
- King County Sheriff's Office Air Support (three helicopters)
- Pierce County Sheriff's Department Air Operations - two Cessna 206s
- Snohomish County Sheriff's Office Air Support
- Spokane County Sheriff's Office (three helicopters)

West Virginia

- West Virginia State Police Aviation Section

Wisconsin

- Wisconsin State Patrol Air Support Unit

Vietnam

- Police Aviation Regiment

=== Disbanded units ===
United Kingdom

- Chiltern Air Support Unit
- Western Counties Air Operations Unit

United States

- Nevada Highway Patrol Flight Operations
- Port Authority of NY and NJ Police Department Aviation Unit

=== Border guards and customs services ===
Estonia

- Police and Border Guard Aviation Group

Italy

- Air Maritime Exploration Squadron Guardia di Finanza

United States

- Customs & Border Protection Air and Marine Operations

=== Maritime law enforcement agencies ===
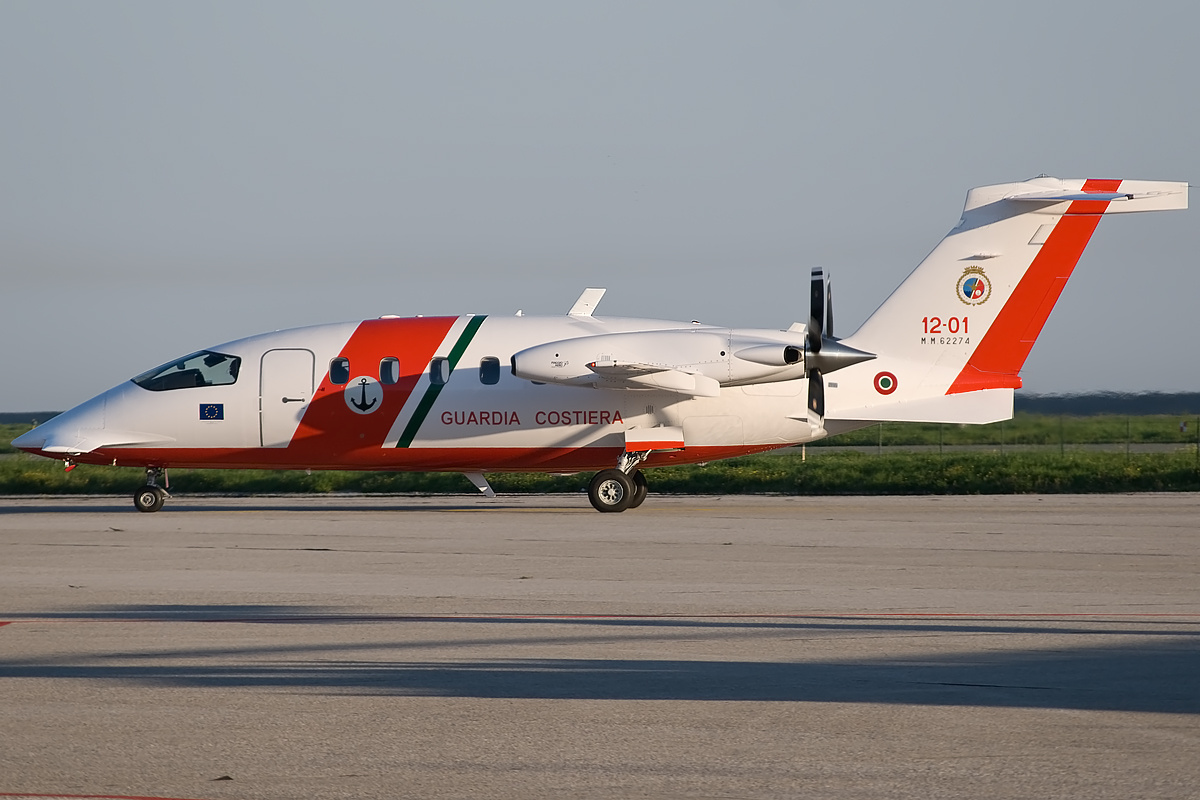
A Piaggio P.180 Avanti operated by the Italian Coast Guard Air Service

Iceland

- Icelandic Coast Guard Aeronautical Division

Italy

- Italian Coast Guard Air Service

Spain

- Galician Coast Guard

United States

- US Coast Guard Helicopter Interdiction Tactical Squadron

== See also ==
- Airship Management Services
- Border guard
- Police aviation in the United Kingdom
- Military aviation
