= CCGS Parizeau =

Canadian research vessel

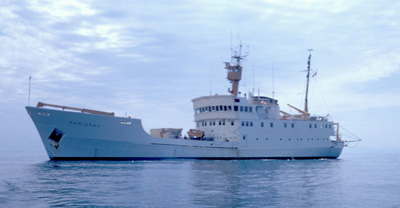
- Parizeau repainted while on loan to the United States Geological Survey

History

Canada
- Name: Parizeau
- Namesake: Henri Dalpe Parizeau, hydrographer
- Operator: Department of Mines and Technical Surveys/Fisheries and Oceans Canada (1966–1995); Canadian Coast Guard (1995–2001)
- Builder: Burrard Dry Dock
- Yard number: 332
- Launched: 1967
- Completed: October 1967
- Commissioned: 1967
- Decommissioned: 2001
- Renamed: 2001–04 (2001–2005); Destiny Empress (2005–2011)
- Home port: Sidney, British Columbia (1967–1991); Dartmouth, Nova Scotia (1992–2001); St. John's, Antigua and Barbuda (2005)
- Identification: IMO number: 6711728
- Fate: Broken up 2011

General characteristics
- Type: Research vessel
- Tonnage: 1,314 GRT; 676 DWT
- Length: 64.5 m (211 ft 7 in)
- Beam: 12.2 m (40 ft 0 in)
- Draught: 4.6 m (15 ft 1 in)
- Propulsion: 2 × screw Diesel, 2,640 bhp (1,970 kW)
- Speed: 14 knots (26 km/h)
- Range: 17,500 nautical miles (32,400 km) at 10 knots (19 km/h).
- Endurance: 60 days

CCGS Parizeau (Note: CCGS stands for Canadian Coast Guard Ship) was a Canadian Coast Guard research vessel that served from 1967 to 2001. Initially serving on the West Coast of Canada from 1967 to 1991, in 1992, the ship transferred to the East Coast of Canada. Taken out of service in 2004, the ship was later sold and converted to a yacht and unsuccessfully used for drug smuggling as Destiny Empress.

== Description ==
Parizeau was of steel construction, designed for offshore research and survey. The ship was 64.5 metres (211 ft 7 in) long overall and 56.5 metres (185 ft 4 in) long between perpendiculars, with a beam of 12.2 metres (40 ft 0 in) and a draught of 4.6 metres (15 ft 1 in). The ship had a tonnage of 1,314 gross register tons (GRT) and 676 tons deadweight (DWT). The ship was powered by a geared diesel engine driving two controllable pitch screws and a bow thruster, creating 2,640 brake horsepower (1,970 kW). This gave the vessel a maximum speed of 14 knots (26 km/h). The ship had a fuel capacity of 416 m^{3} (92,000 imp gal) giving Parizeau a range of 17,500 nautical miles (32,400 km) at 10 knots (19 km/h). The research vessel had an endurance of 60 days.

== Service history ==
=== Canadian government service ===
Named for Canadian Hydrographic Service hydrographer Henri Dalpé Parizeau, the ship was built by Burrard Dry Dock at their yard in North Vancouver and launched in 1967. The vessel was completed in October 1967 and was commissioned as CSS Parizeau (Canadian Survey Ship Parizeau) with what would become the Department of Fisheries and Oceans (DFO). Parizeau was the first of two science vessels built using the same hull design.

Parizeau served with DFO's Pacific Region from 1967 until 1991 at the Institute of Ocean Sciences, Sidney, British Columbia when she was transferred to DFO's Maritime Region where she was attached to the Bedford Institute of Oceanography, Dartmouth, Nova Scotia. Parizeau served in the DFO's Maritime Region as a replacement vessel for her soon to be decommissioned sister CSS Dawson. Following the transfer of the Canadian Coast Guard (CCG) to DFO in 1995 and the merger of the DFO science and enforcement vessels into CCG, Parizeau's prefix was changed from CSS to CCGS, the superstructure colour scheme was changed from science vessel white, with a buff coloured funnel to the Canadian Coast Guard red hull and white superstructure colour scheme. Parizeau ceased government science programs in June 2000.

=== Decommissioning and sale ===
Parizeau was decommissioned in 2001 and renamed 2001–04 upon transfer to Crown Assets for disposal. The ship was sold to Premananthan Iyar, registered as a yacht at Montreal in January 2005 and renamed Destiny Empress. The vessel then changed hands several times. In 2008, the ship was taken to Shelburne, Nova Scotia to be refurbished.

=== December 2009 seizure ===
Destiny Empress initially became a target for surveillance after a UK police, executing a raid on a suspected drug house in connection with a narcotics and money laundering investigation in London, noticed a receipt for over £100,000 in ship repairs paid to Irving Shipbuilding, owner of Shelburne Ship Repair Ltd., a shipyard in Shelburne. Additional payments were subsequently identified and determined to be for the refurbishment of an ex-Canadian Coast Guard ship now named Destiny Empress. A joint task force including UK, Dutch and Spanish authorities initiated an extensive investigation which resulted in the arrest of 15 persons (separately, and in addition to the Destiny Empress' crew), seizing additional drugs, weapons and currency. Destiny Empress docked in Trinidad for some time for preparations prior to departing for Europe, including the building of a hidden compartment to transport drugs.

On 22 December 2009, a joint European law enforcement team, including Spanish Police and Italy's Air Maritime Exploration Squadron Guardia di Finanza (a special flight Squadron of the Italy' GDF Air Service), acting on intelligence from the London Metropolitan Police, seized the ship and arrested the seven person crew 200 nmi (370 km) west of Spain's northwest coast. After several days of searching, officers found a secret compartment under a trap door that had been bolted down with an aluminum plate and covered by carpet in one of Destiny Empress's rooms. The sealed compartment contained 1.5 t (1.5 long tons) of cocaine with an estimated street value of £375 million, according to UK police. The crew included Philip Halliday, a Canadian fisherman and seaman from Digby, Nova Scotia and Reginald Stuart II, an American dive instructor and aspiring seaman from Silver Spring, Maryland, both of whom claimed to be innocent of any wrongdoing and only contracted deck hands hired to transport the vessel to European buyers. Also among the crew were four Romanian nationals and Kevin Fletcher, the British captain.

=== Legal proceedings ===
On 4 August 2011, the UK portion of the investigation was concluded, with 13 of the persons arrested pleading guilty and one convicted of various charges ranging from money laundering, drug offenses and weapons charges. The 14 persons received terms of imprisonment totalling 79 years. One person was acquitted. As of April 2012, the Destiny Empress crew remained in Spanish prison awaiting trial.

The trial of the crew and four other individuals associated with Destiny Express began in Spain on 20 November 2012. There was a delay in the proceedings because the police witness from Scotland Yard failed to testify. The final arguments by the prosecution and defense were made on 3 December 2012. On 4 December three members of the crew, Mehai Alexandru Grau, Stephanescu Vichenta and Reginald Stuart II, were released though they were not permitted to leave Spain until the conclusion of proceedings. The court's final decision was handed down 13 February 2013. Mehai Alexandru Grau, Stephanescu Vichenta and Reginald Stuart II were found innocent, but were not able to seek compensation for time served because of legal nuance. The other three crew members, including Phillip Halliday of Canada received custodial sentences limited to the time they had served. The captain and the ringleaders received 9–12 years in detention.

Destiny Empress was sold by Spanish authorities in auction and subsequently arrived at Aliağa, Turkey for demolition on 19 July 2011.

== Sources ==
- "Boat with £375m of cocaine seized". BBC News. 22 December 2009.
- "CCG Fleet: Vessel Details – CCGS Parizeau". Canadian Coast Guard. 24 March 2017.
- "Digby man caught up in major European drug bust". CBC News. 24 December 2009.
- Figueira, Daurius (2012). Cocaine trafficking in the Caribbean and West Africa in the era of the Mexican cartels. Bloomington: iUniverse. ISBN 978-1-47596-141-6.
- Ha, Tu Thanh (4 August 2011). "Scrap in the trash led to U.K. drug bust". The Globe and Mail.
- Maginley, Charles D. & Collin, Bernard (2001). The Ships of Canada's Marine Services. St. Catharines, Ontario: Vanwell Publishing Limited. ISBN 1-55125-070-5.
- Medel, Brian (4 April 2012). "'It's terrible,' wife says upon seeing spouse jailed in Spain". Halifax Chronicle Herald.
- "Parizeau (6711728)". Miramar Ship Index.
