= Law enforcement in Mexico City =

Coordinates: 19°25′30.5″N 99°7′7.2″W

Secretariat of Citizen Security of Mexico City Secretaría de Seguridad Ciudadana de la Ciudad de México
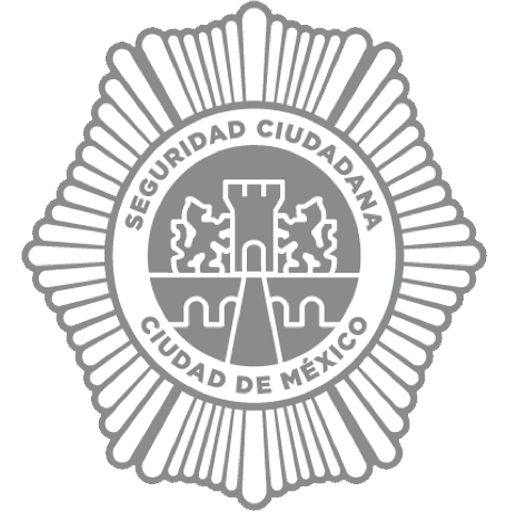
- Common name: Mexico City Police
- Abbreviation: SSC CDMX

Agency overview
- Employees: 88,000
- Annual budget: $106 billion pesos - 2011 ($5.05 billion USD)

Jurisdictional structure
- Operations jurisdiction: Mexico City, Mexico
- Population: 8,400,000
- Legal jurisdiction: Mexico City
- General nature: Local civilian police

Facilities
- Helicopters: 12

Website
- https://www.ssc.cdmx.gob.mx

Law enforcement in Mexico City is provided by two primary agencies; the Secretariat of Citizen Security of Mexico City (Spanish: Secretaría de Seguridad Ciudadana de la Ciudad de México; SSC), who provide uniformed or preventative police, and the Office of the Attorney General of Mexico City (Fiscalía General de Justicia de la Ciudad de México) who provide plainclothes detectives and crime lab services.

== Secretariat of Citizen Security ==
The Secretariat of Citizen Security of Mexico City is the uniformed law enforcement agency of Mexico City, headquartered in Venustiano Carranza. It manages a combined force of over 100,000 officers in Mexico City.

The Mexico City Police (Policía de la Ciudad de México) is the police department of Mexico City. The city contains the seat of the federal government of Mexico. There are 8.84 million residents of the city, according to 2009 estimates, and another 21.1 million people in the metropolitan region.

The SSC is charged with maintaining public order and safety in the center of Mexico City where public insecurity and crime rates are the highest in the nation. As a result, there have been concurrent efforts to increase accountability and improve police effectiveness. Beginning in 1996, authorities began a dramatic restructuring of the SSC, which included replacing major officials with army officers. Recently, the most recent high-profile effort has been Mayor and future President Andrés Manuel López Obrador’s announcement in 2002 that the city would contract former New York City Mayor Rudolph Giuliani as a consultant to the SSC.

The SSC also regulates the huge private security industry in the city and operates the Animal Control Unit (Brigada de Vigiliancia Animal).

=== Organization ===
Mexico City has a large uniformed "preventive police" force of approximately 34,000 officers, not to mention 40,000 auxiliary police and 15,000 banking police. These nearly 90,000 officers work for the Secretariat of Citizen Security of Mexico City (Secretaría de Seguridad Ciudadana – SSC CDMX). In 2011, the SSP had a budget of about $106 billion pesos (an increase from the previous year's $89 billion pesos).

=== Command and Staff ===
The organizational structure and holders of area Public Safety Department are:

Secretary of Public Safety (Secretario de Seguridad Pública): Jesús Orto Martínez

- Undersecretary Traffic Control (Subsecretaría de Control de Tránsito): Alejandro Martinez Fernando Badillo
- Undersecretary of Police Operation (Subsecretaría de Operación Policial): Luis Rosales Gamboa
- Undersecretary for Police Intelligence Information (Subsecretaría de Información de Inteligencia Policial): Juan Carlos Contreras Licona
- Undersecretary for Institutional Development(Subsecretaría de Desarrollo Institucional): Luis Alfredo Hernández Velázquez
- Undersecretary for Public Participation and Crime Prevention (Subsecretaría de Participación Ciudadana y Prevención del Delito): Yolanda García Cornejo

=== Preventive Police ===
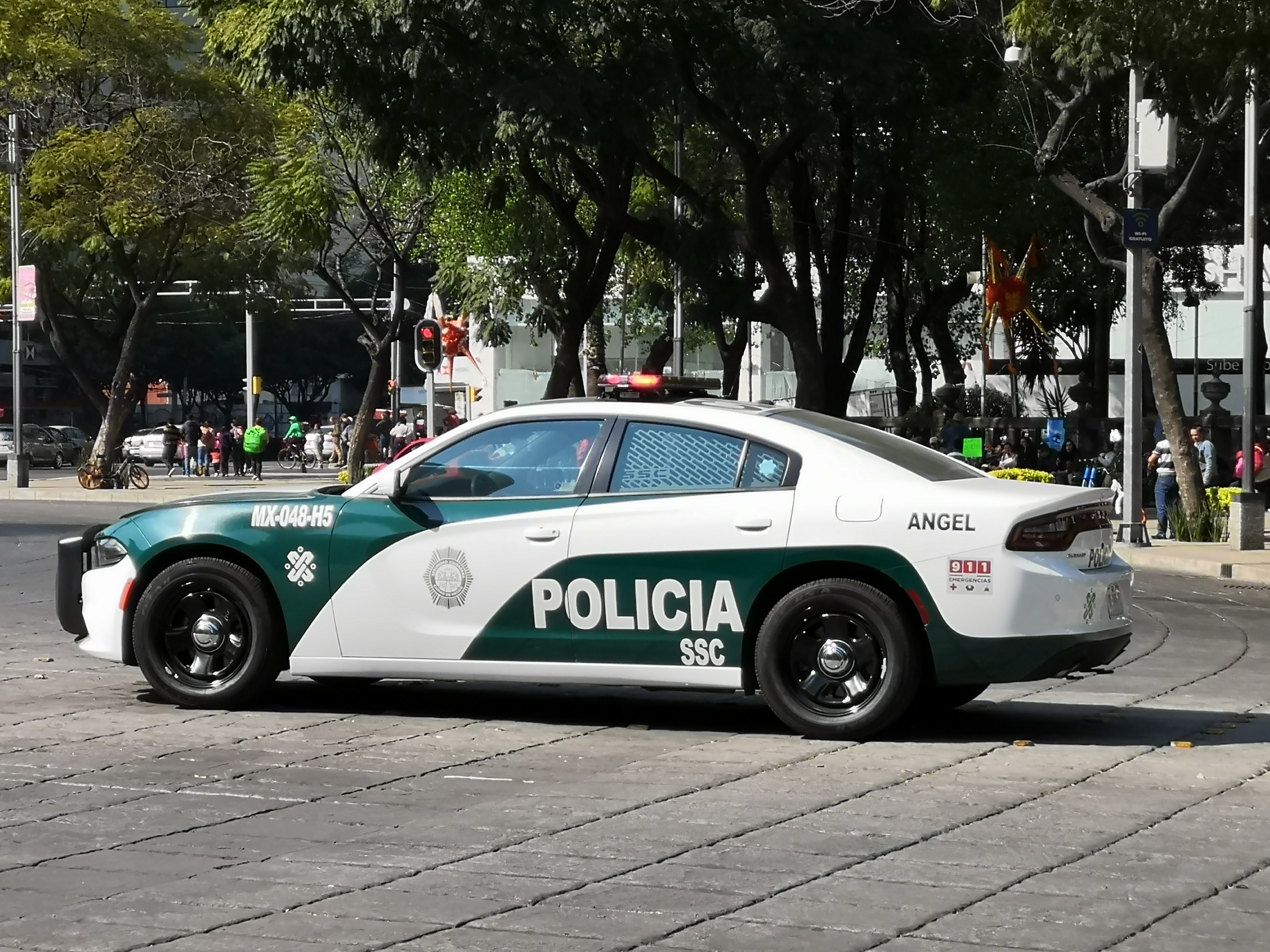
Mexico City Police Dodge Charger in the new livery

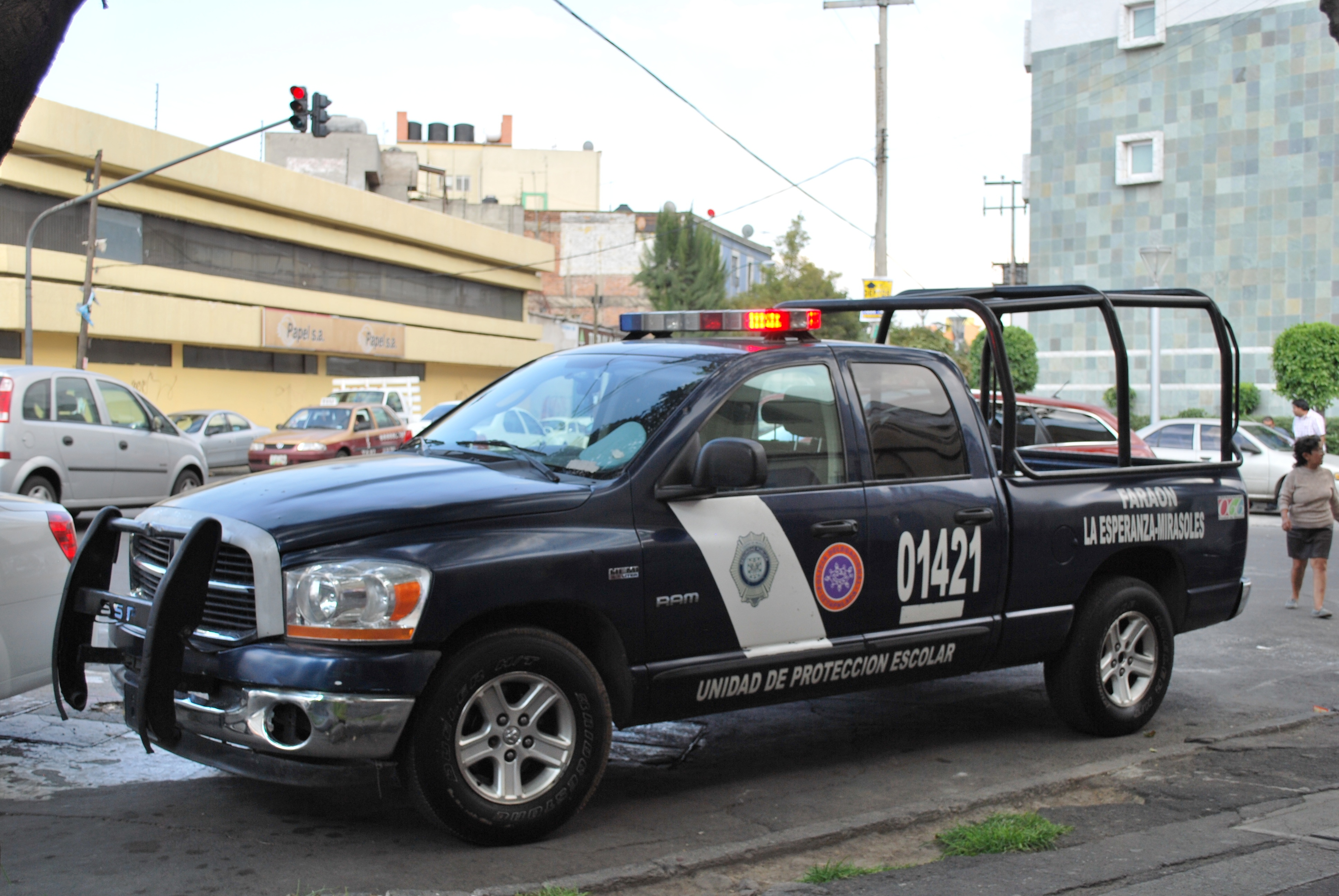
School Protection police vehicle

The 34,000 strong Preventive Police are the uniformed police of Mexico City. They are organized into seven major divisions. as follows:

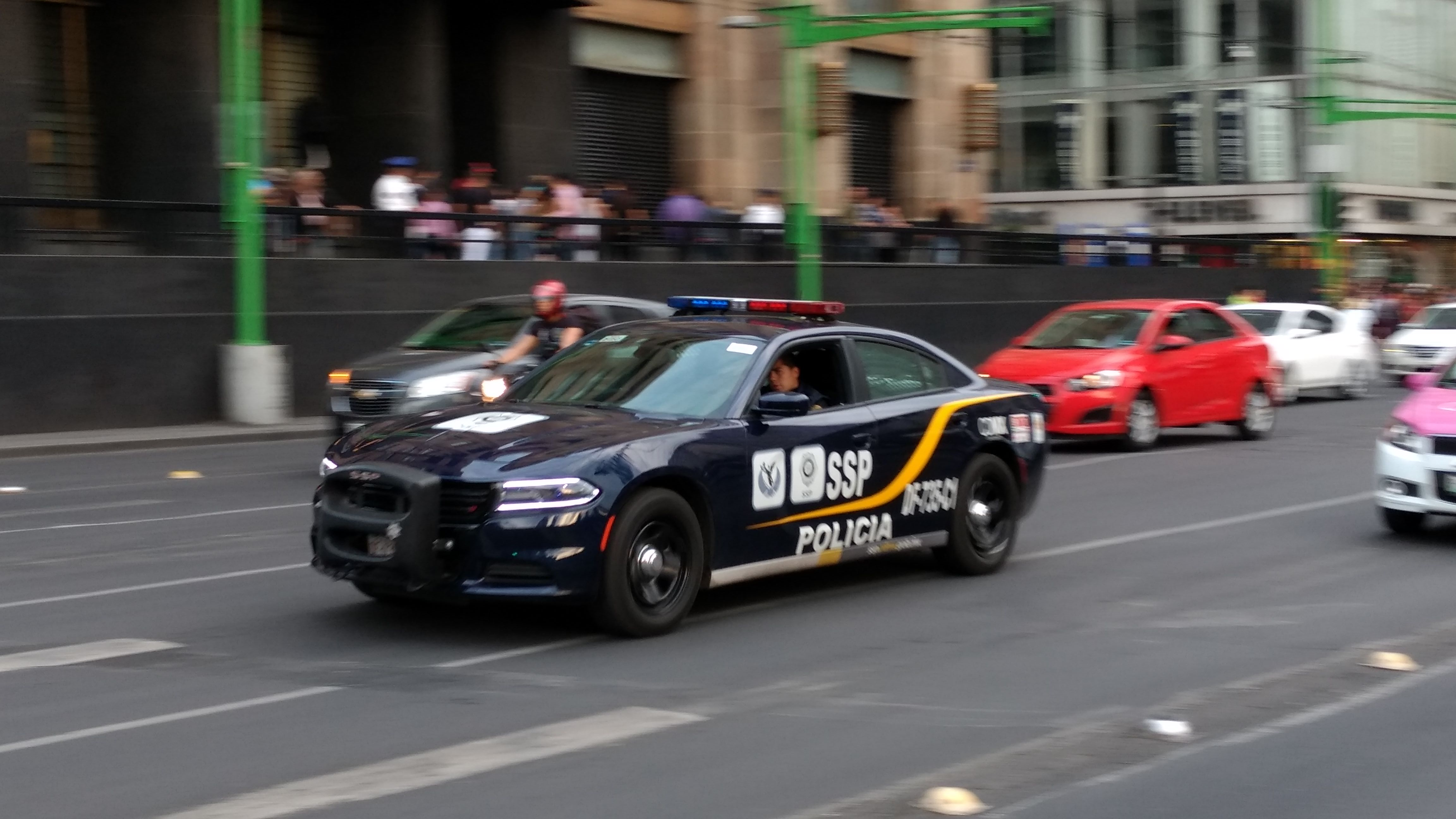
Mexico City Police Dodge Charger.

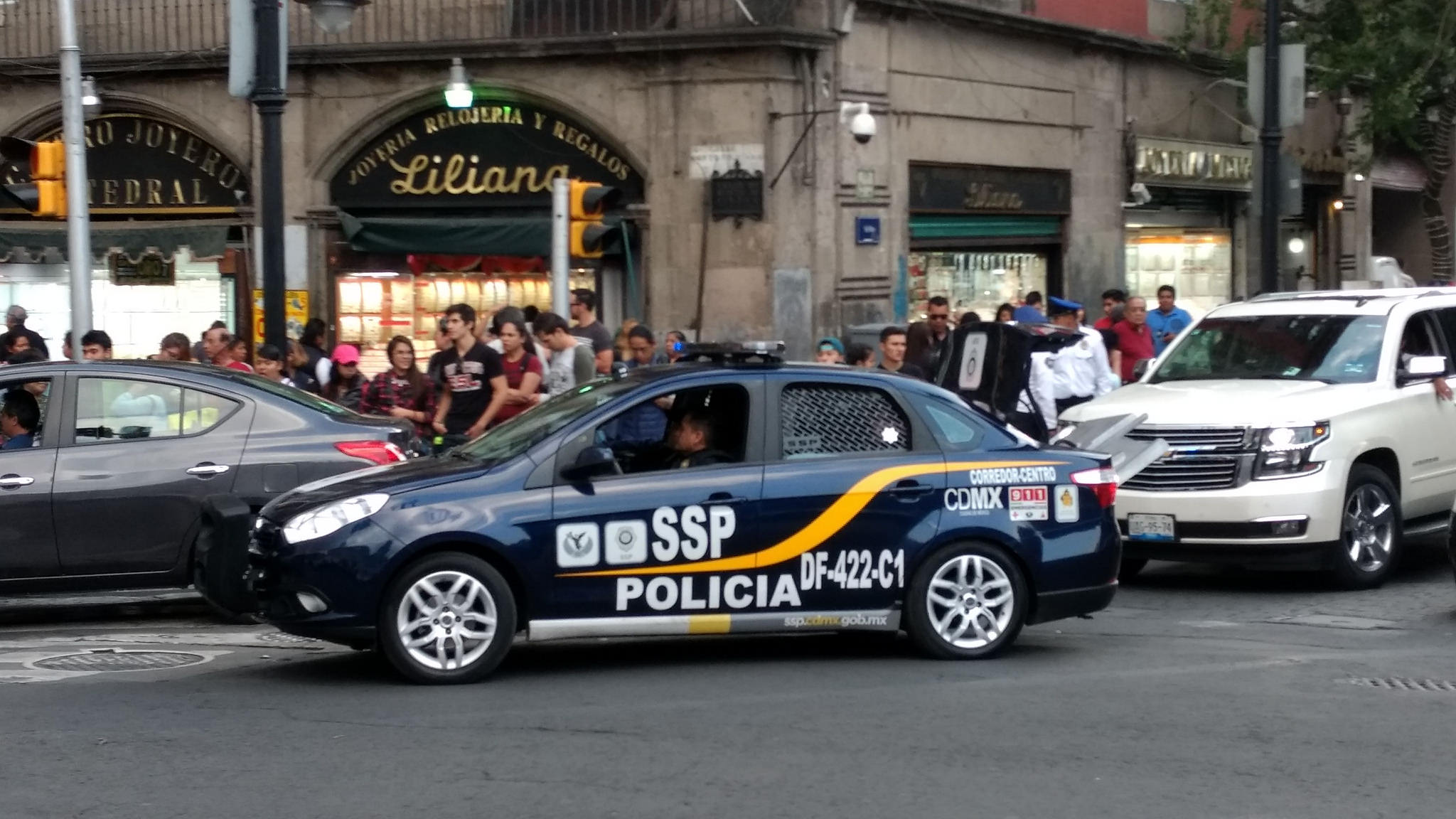
Mexico City Police Dodge Vision.

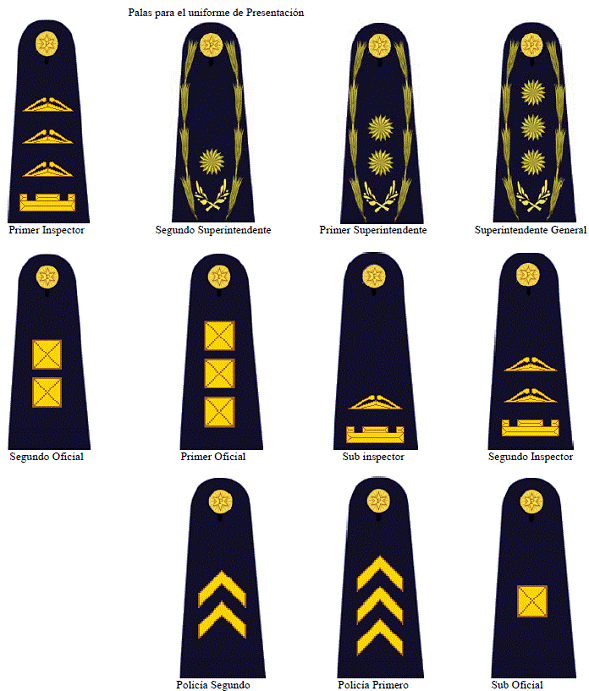
Rank insignia of the Mexico City Police.

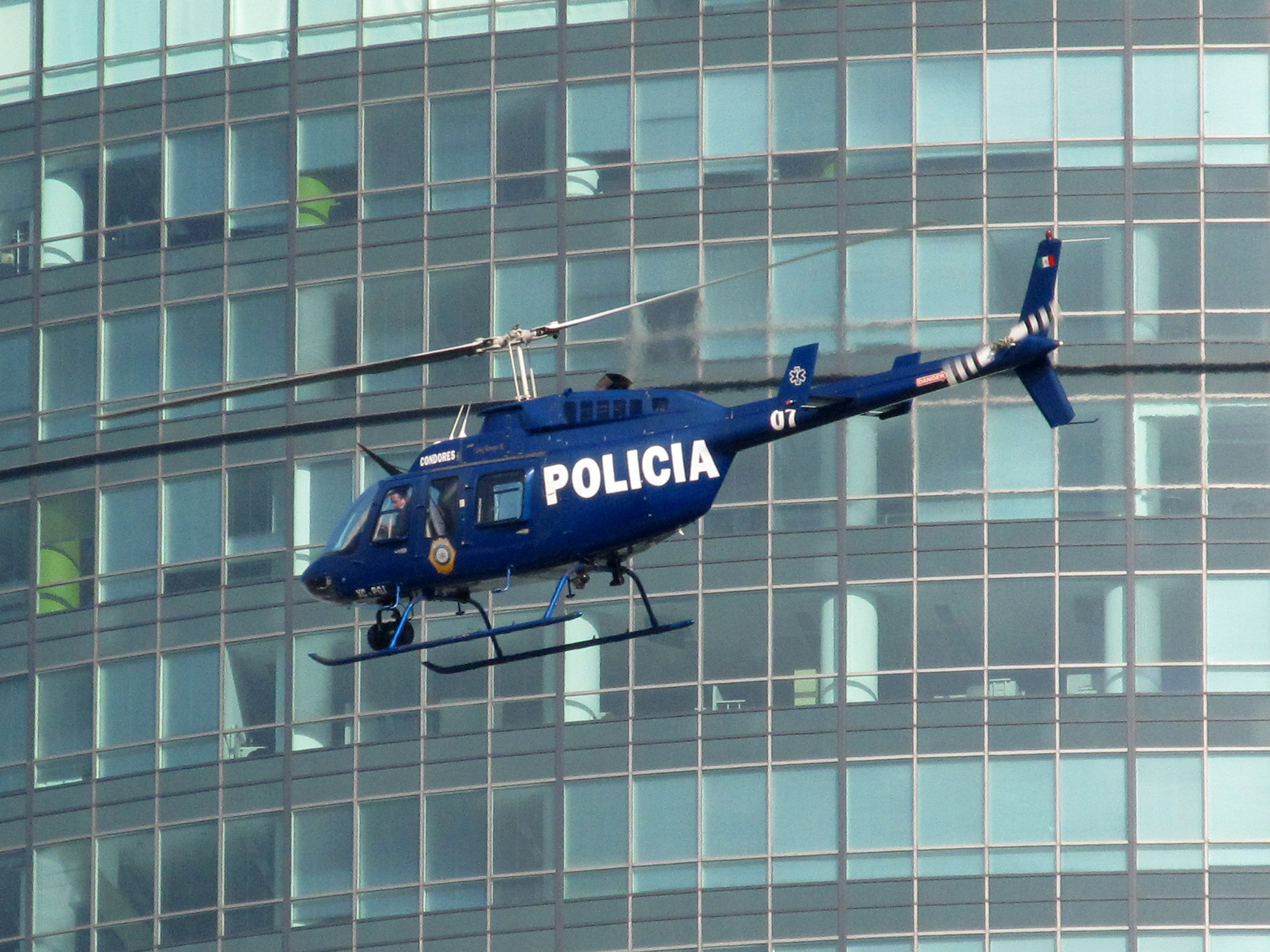
Bell 206 of the Mexico City Police's Cóndores Group.

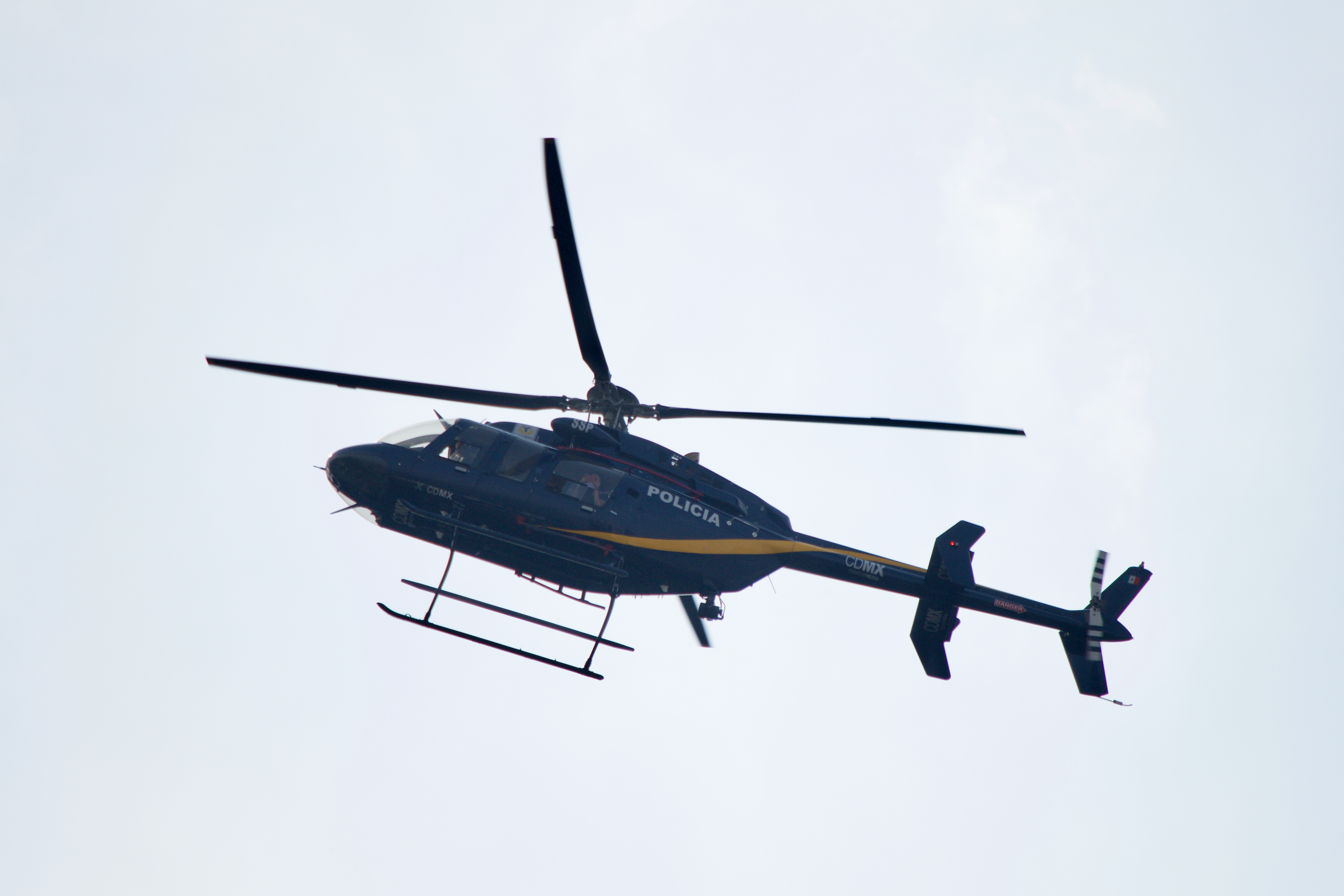
Bell 407 of the Mexico City Police's Cóndores Group

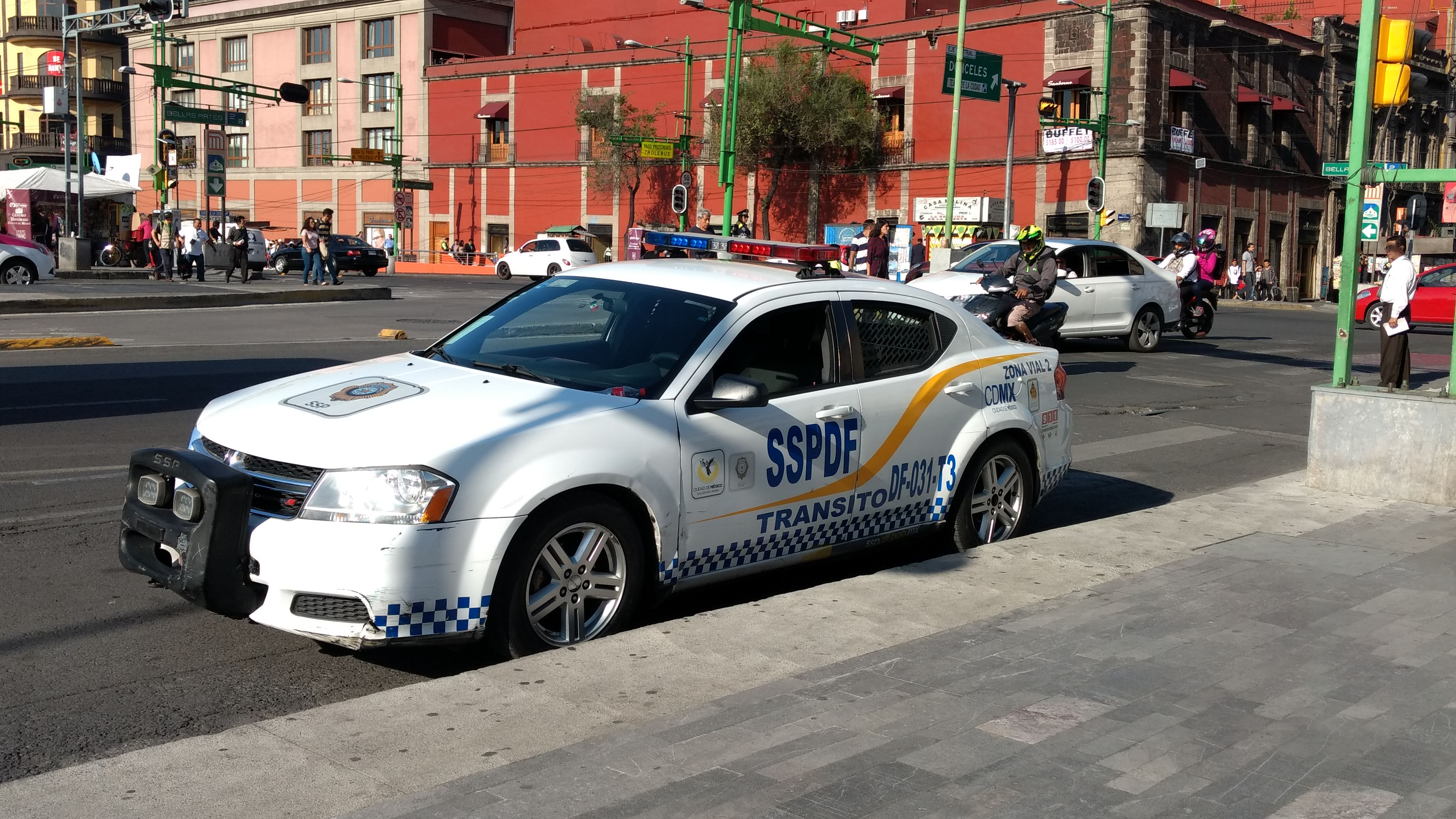
Dodge Avenger of the Traffic enforcement Police

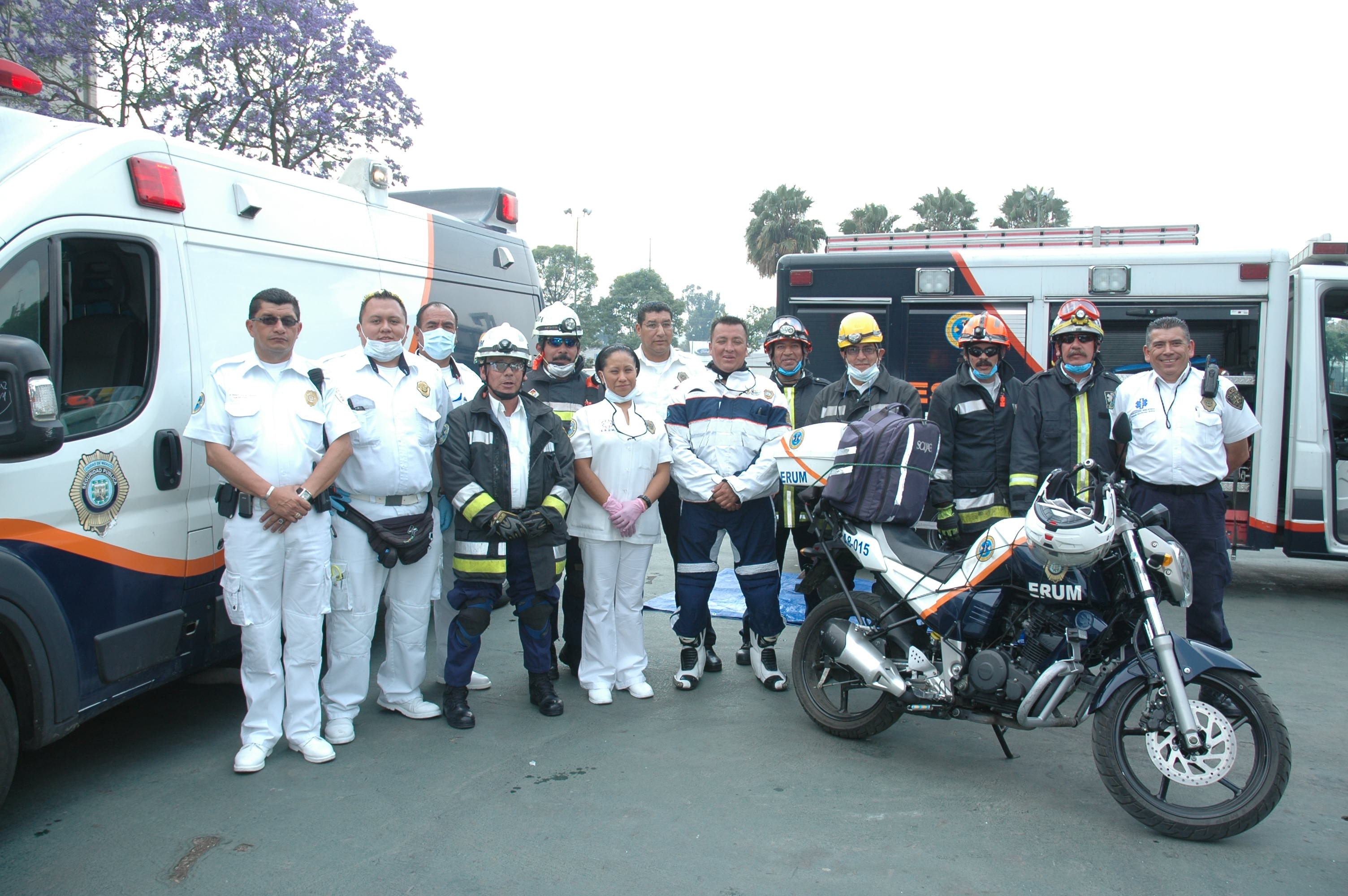
Members of the Medical Urgencies and Rescue Squadron (ERUM), the Emergency medical services of the SSC.

- Proximity Police (Unidades de Policía de Proximidad) formerly the Citizens Protection (Unidades de Protección Ciudadana) and before that Sector Police (Policía Sectoral) - The 17,000 plus blue uniformed Proximity Police is the largest division and provides community policing services throughout Mexico City. The Proximity Police consists of slightly less than half of the total Preventive Police and they are distributed geographically across six main regions, each with around three precincts for a total of 16 precincts. Each precinct is then subdivided into a number of sectors of which there are 70.

The remaining five divisions of the Preventive Police, containing over 17,000 officers, are organized as follows:

- The Metropolitan Police (Policía Metropolitana) which consists of five district-wide units:
  - Public Transit Police (Policía de Tránsito): a traffic police force responsible for overseeing and enforcing traffic safety compliance on roads and highways. It is headed by the Director of Traffic.
  - Tourist Police (Policía Turística): The Tourist Police gives information on laws, customs and cultural attractions in the local community as well as tourist attractions. Officers of the Tourist Police wear a distinctive green uniform and speak English as well as some other European languages. They can be called upon for all kinds of situations, such as road traffic accidents, theft, disputes with hotels or shop keepers where a foreign tourist is involved. They will also act as arbitrators in disputes, and are supposed to do so in an unbiased fashion.
  - Mounted Police (Agrupamiento A Caballo) - provides security and protection in parks, gardens and green areas. Also guard the Eastern Prison, and when sporting, social and artistic monitor forums where they performed. They also assist in the conduct and monitoring of mass events, such as: marches, demonstrations, sit-ins and rallies. Also, there is security guard in the colonias and housing units increased crime rate. Mounted police are also responsible for directing the operation of horse detachments of the Ministry of Public Security to support dismounted elements and mobile groups, subject to established devices.
  - Feminine Police (Policía Femenil): The Feminine Police work in schools, with juveniles, at public events and in public parks and gardens.
  - Environmental Police (Policia Ambiental):283 men patrol on foot and by horse the nine delegations from the south and west of the City of Mexico, where the ecological reserve is located.
- Medical Urgencies and Rescue Squad (Escuadron de Rescate y Urgencias Medicas or ERUM).
- Special Forces (Fuerzas Especiales) consisting of four main groups:
  - Condor Group (Agrupamiento Cóndores formerly called the Escuadron Helicopteros). Equipped with seven Eurocopter AS 350 Ecureuil, one Bell 412, and two Bell 206.
  - Special Unit (Buczo Especial): A specialized unit responsible for combined duties involving traffic enforcement, crowd control, and special weapons and tactics (SWAT) services within the city. One unique feature of the unit is that it relies on the use of motorcycles in their daily patrols allowing the unit to perform routine traffic enforcement, accompany parades, crowds, and visiting dignitaries, and to quickly travel to situations wherein the unit's SWAT skills are requested. Specialized trucks and support vehicles are also used to transport equipment and officers when needed.
    - Acrobatic Group (Escuadron Acrobatico) - Founded in the twenties, by officers of the Germandería Motorized with Harley Davidson motorcycles of 1200 cm3 and a weight of 420 kg
  - Task Force (Agrupamiento Fuerza de Tarea): The Task Force deals with terrorist, bomb threats, Search and rescue lost or trapped persons.
  - Alfa Group (Agrupamiento Alfa): A secretive, ad hoc force that works with the Special Unit and fights drug trafficking.
  - Grenadiers (Agrupamiento de Granaderos/Cuerpo de Granaderos (Oriente y Poniente)): The 2,000 Grenadiers protect the historic areas of the federal district. They provide Crowd Control, Sector Support to banks, prisons, treasuries, payment offices, government offices, patrolling teams, launch and eviction proceedings, police sporting events, and participate in cultural and religious events with the Police Band and escort dignitaries and VIPs and haul down the flag. In matters of religious worship is involved with security and surveillance mainly 12 Dec at the Basilica of Guadalupe, Easter, and the Day of the Dead.
- Roadway Security (Seguridad Vial): The Roadway Security maintains a force of 2,600 yellow-uniformed police that patrol the roads and highways.
- Internal Affairs: Investigates incidents and plausible suspicions of lawbreaking and professional misconduct attributed to officers on the force. Internal affairs can also refer to cases of misconduct and criminal behavior involving police officers.

=== Complementary Police ===
There are two Complementary Police (policías complementarias) which operates under the supervision of the SSP, yet is not considered to be a part of the Preventive Police. The Complementary Police contains two Security Police forces:

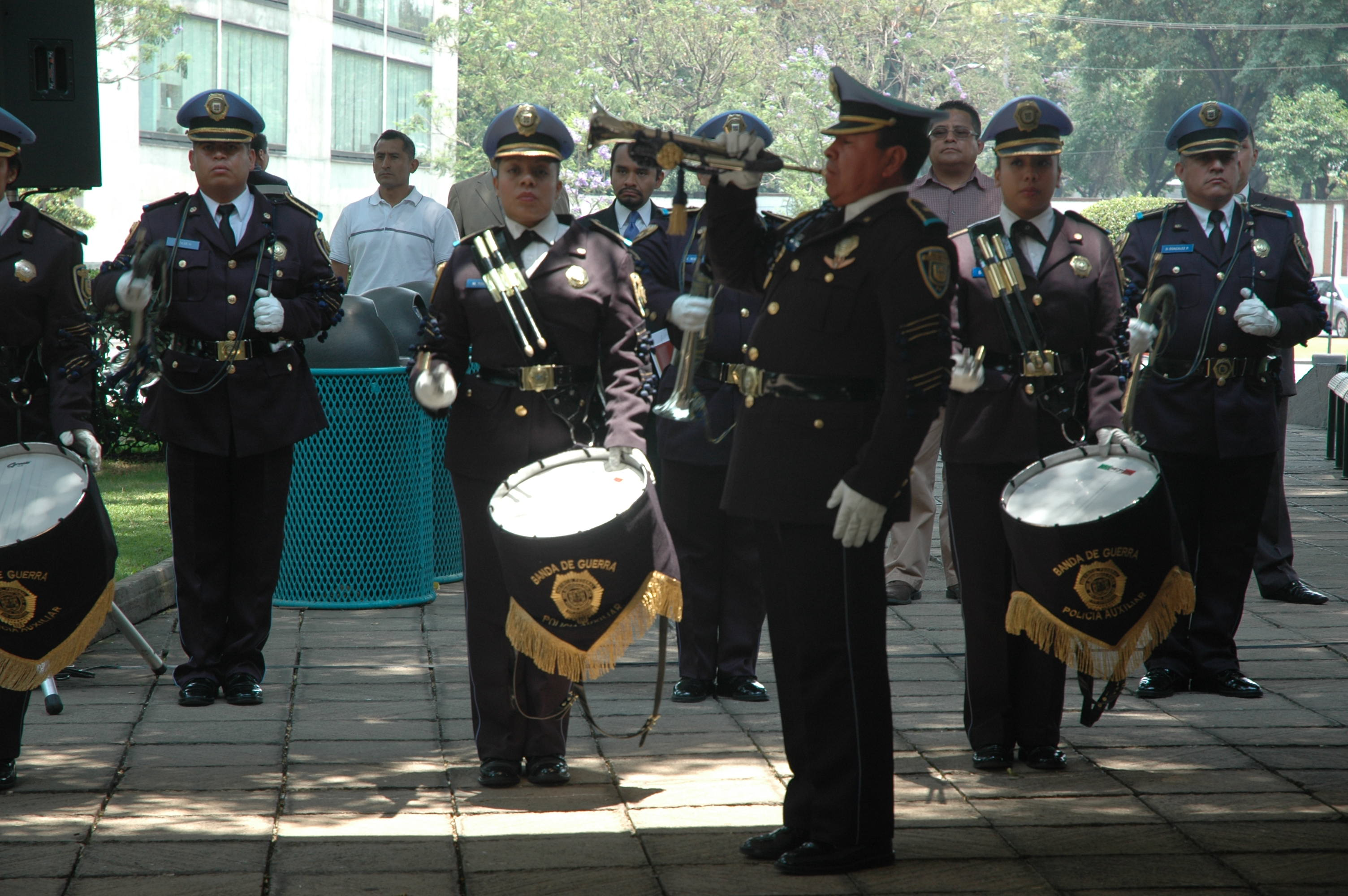
Auxiliary Police band

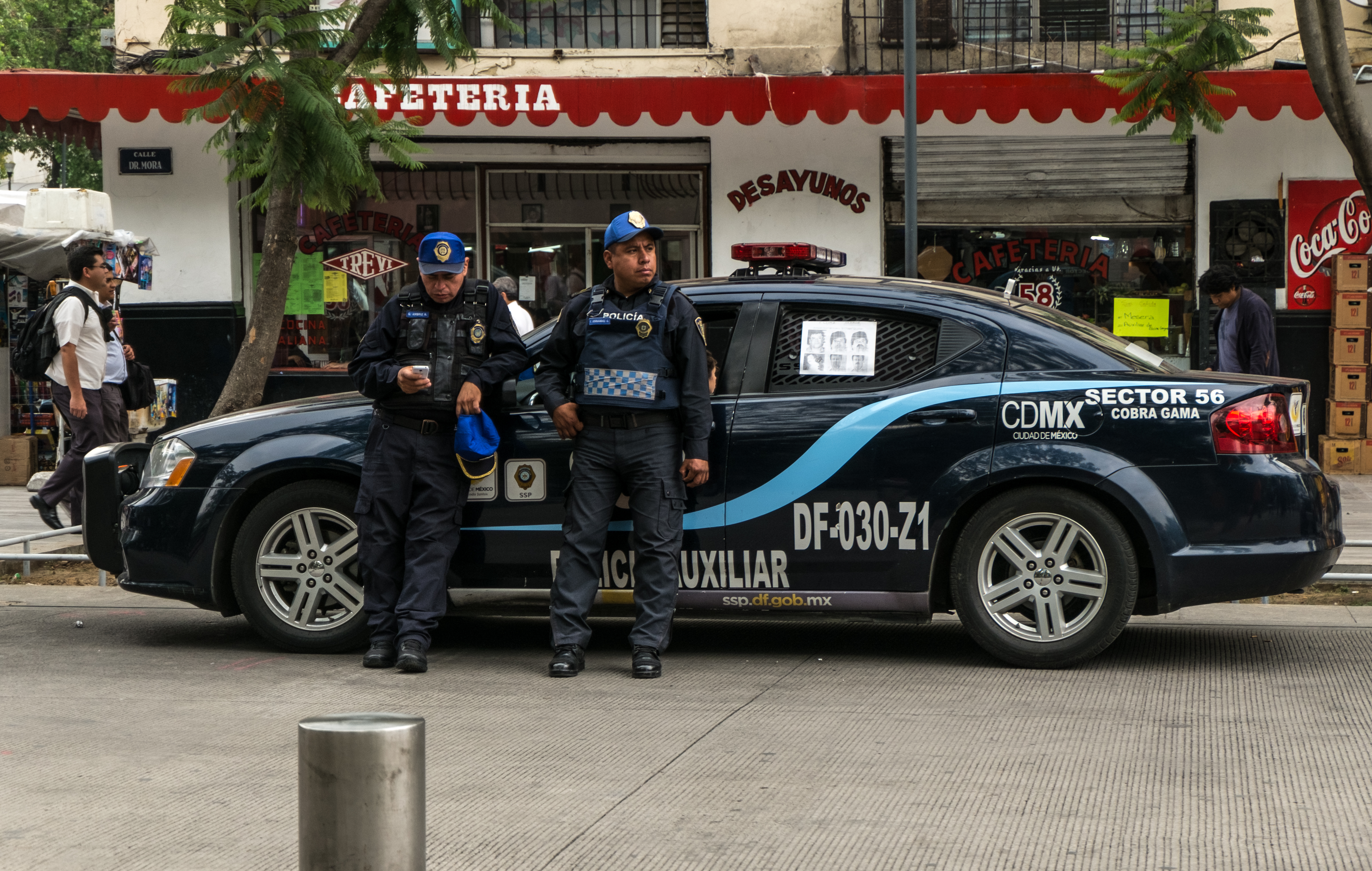
Auxiliary Police

32362.63.263

- Auxiliary Police (Policía Auxiliar): A security police force of approximately 40,000 security police officers that guards official buildings and other specific locations like the airport. On 20 May 2005, published in the Official Gazette of the Federal District's Internal Regulations of the Ministry of Public Security of the Federal District, which states that provide Supplemental Police protective services, custody and security of people and property values and property to, entities and bodies of the executive, legislative and judicial branches of the Federal District and Federal, federal and local self-government bodies as well as individuals and corporations, on payment of the consideration to be determined. The Auxiliary Police includes the following:
  - Citizen Protection Units (Unidades de Protección Ciudadana (UPC's)) 37 UPC's with a total of 14,800 personnel for public housing projects.
  - Reaction Force (Grupo Fuerza Reaccion) of 900 officers specializing in crowd control.
- Bank Police (Policía Bancaria e Industrial (aka Bancarios)): A 15,000 security police officers strong force who provides security services, surveillance and specialized protection to public and private corporations based in the Mexico City metropolitan area, such as Service Providers, Banks, Industry, Trade, and Institutions Unit. It also provides services and personal security guard and transport custody of securities, commodities and products, etc.

=== Private Security Directorate ===
The Directorate General of Private Security and Systematic Operating Procedures (la dirección general de seguridad privada y procedimientos sistemáticos de operación), regulates the activities and the provision of private security services in Mexico City, to ensure that such operations take place under the best conditions of efficiency, reliability, professionalism and legal and financial support for the benefit of the population.

=== Secretaries of Public Security ===
Government of Ramón Aguirre Velázquez (1982-1988)

- (1988): Enrique Jackson

Government of Manuel Camacho Solis (1988 - 1993)

- (1988 - 1991): Javier García Paniagua
- (1991 - 1993): Santiago Tapia Aceves

Government of Cuauhtémoc Cárdenas Solórzano (1997 - 1999)

- (1997 - 1998): Rodolfo Debernandi Debernandi
- (1998 - 1999): Alejandro Gertz Manero

Government of Rosario Robles (1999 - 2000)

- (1999 - 2000): Alejandro Gertz Manero

Government of Andrés Manuel López Obrador (2000 - 2005)

- (2000 - 2002): Leonel Godoy Rangel
- (2002 - 2004): Marcelo Ebrard
- (2004 - 2005): Joel Ortega

Government Alejandro Encinas Rodríguez (2005 - 2006)

- (2005 - 2006): Joel Ortega

Government Marcelo Ebrard (2006 - 2012)

- (2006 - 2008): Joel Ortega
- (2008 - 2012): Manuel Mondragón y Kalb
- (2012): Luis Rosales Gamboa (as Charge Dispatch (Encargado de Despacho))

Government of Miguel Angel Mancera (2012 - 2018)

- (2012 - 2014): Jesús Rodríguez Almeida
- (2014): Luis Rosales Gamboa (as Acting Head)
- (2014 - 2018): Hiram Almeida Estrada

Gobierno de José Ramón Amieva Gálvez (17 April 2018 - 5 December 2018)

- (5 July 2018 - 5 December 2018): Raymundo Collins

Gobierno de Claudia Sheinbaum Pardo (5 December 2018 - 16 June 2023)

- 5 December 2018 - 3 October 2019: Jesús Orta Martínez
- 4 October 2019 - 16 June 2023: Omar García Harfuch

Gobierno de Martí Batres Guadarrama (Desde el 16 June 2023)

- 16 June 2023 - Actualidad: Omar García Harfuch

== Police corruption and public confidence ==
Corruption and severe inefficiency plague the Mexican police. Further, low pay and lack of resources have hindered efforts at improving police performance, battling corruption and professionalizing the forces. A related lack of public confidence has further eroded the ability of the police to respond to crime: A survey in 1999 found that 90% of respondents in Mexico City had “little” or “no” trust in the police. Such a lack of public confidence translates into a lack of support—that is, an unwillingness to report crimes or assist in investigations, which is crucial to solving crimes. Nationwide, only 12% of the population has expressed confidence in the police.

In 2002, advocacy group Transparency International estimated that the median Mexican household spends 8% of its income on bribes (mordidas or “bites”). According to the president of the CCE (Spanish: Consejo Coordinador Empresarial; CCE), businesses spend 10% of their income in bribes. Mexico ranks 57th worldwide in perception of corruption, one notch better than China at 58 and well below Brazil and Peru at 45. In 1997, Mexico ranked 47th; in 1998, 55th. Management consulting firm A.T. Kearney reported in 2002 that Mexico's attractiveness to foreign investors dropped from fifth to ninth place in the world due to concerns with corruption and crime.

was estimated in 1999, that about 10,000 private security firms operated in Mexico, yet only 2,000 had some form of official permit. According to official figures in December 2000, there were 2,984 private security companies registered with 153,885 employees. The inability to regulate or control these forces creates potential security problem. Since many of these companies are unregulated, some will engage in criminality instead of (or as a means of) protecting their clients, thus exacerbating the problem of insecurity. According to a study by the Mexico City legislative assembly, in 1998 there were more private security guards than police. A substantial number of private security guards were formerly police officers or presently work as security guards while off-duty. Private security is regulated by the Secretariat of Public Security.

== See also ==
- Crime in Mexico
- Law enforcement in Mexico
