= Condor Group =

Aviation unit of the Mexico City police

Agrupamiento Condores
- Active: 1971 - current
- Country: Mexico
- Role: Aerial Intelligence, Aerial Support, and Aerial Transport
- Part of: Secretariat of Public Security
- Garrison/HQ: Mexico City International Airport

Aircraft flown
- Observation helicopter: AS350 B3, Bell 212

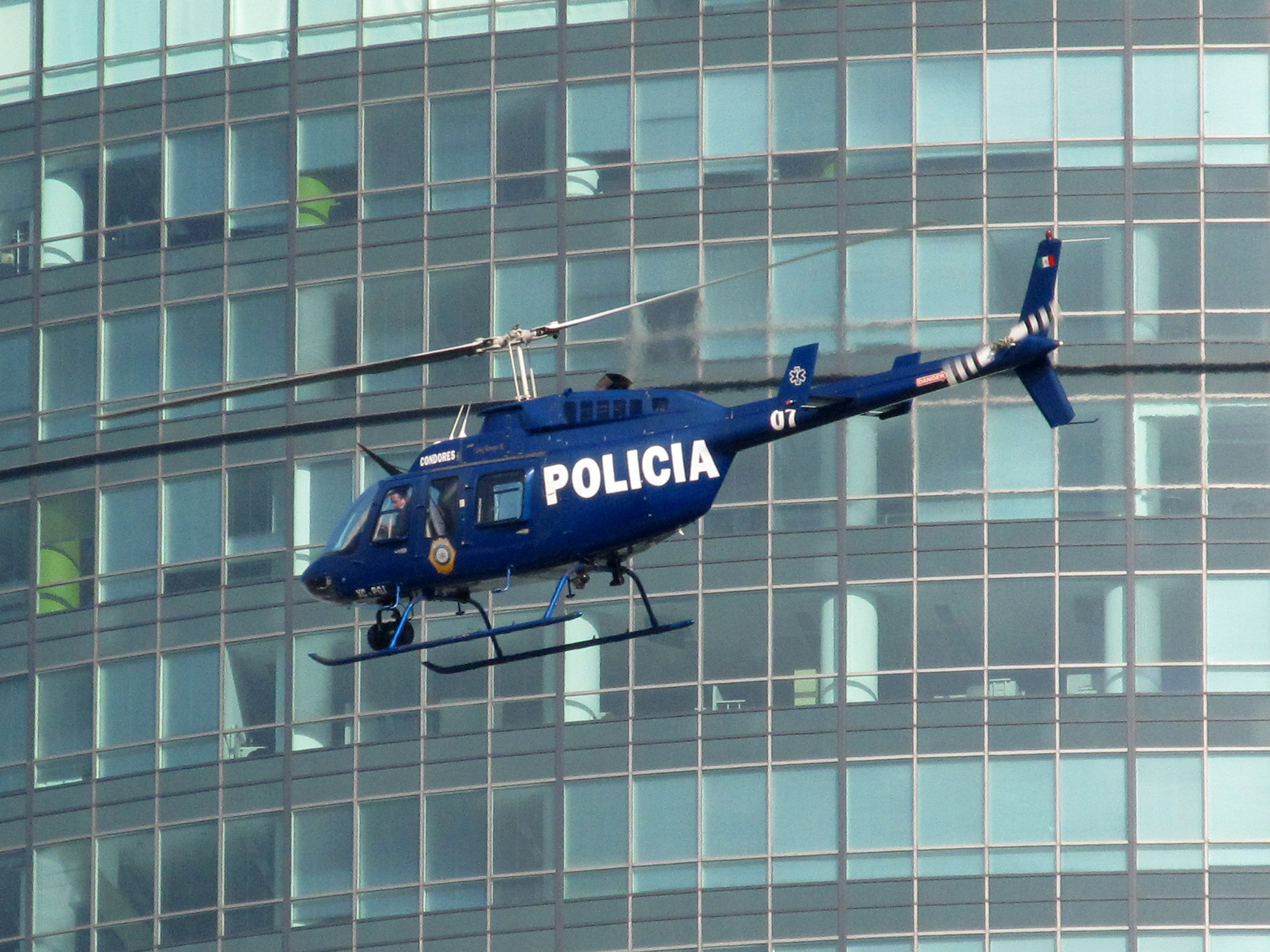
Mexican Police Helicopter

The Condor Group (Agrupamiento Condores) is the aviation unit of the Mexico City Police which operates a fleet of helicopters in support of police and city government operations.

== History ==
The organization founded in 1971 with two helicopters from the Ministry of Security. In 1983, then president, Miguel de la Madrid Hurtado opened a new heliport for the Ministry of Public Security in Mexico City, now the headquarters for the helicopter operations.

During 1970 and 1980, three helicopters were donated to this organization and in 1980 it acquired four Eurocopter AS350 Écureuil helicopters.

== Statistics ==
Although the unit serves 23,564 missions a year, statistics from the organization show that only 42.63% are security work, support for 1.58% of units, aerial medical evacuations 4.15% and 51.61% road patrols

== Personnel ==
Condor Group consists of 38 mechanics, four doctors (3 general practitioners [Dr. Miguel Angel Colin, Dr. Arcadio Ramirez, Dr. Emmanuel Urquieta] and a doctor specializing in trauma and orthopedics, Dr Juan Carlos Lara. 13 operators aeromedical technicians, 17 pilots and 6 students in training as TUM ITFP.

== Fleet ==
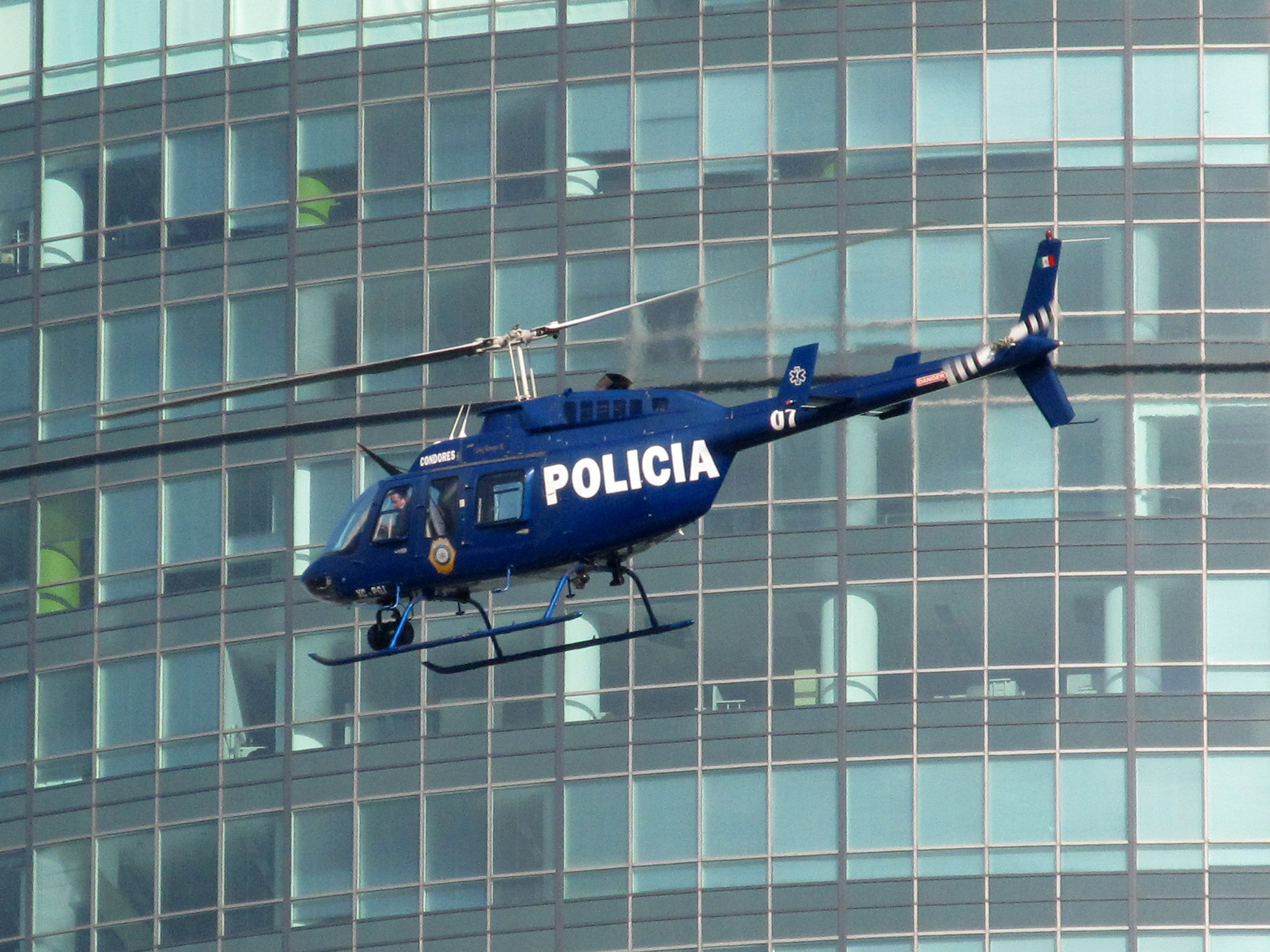
Condor Group Bell 206 (XC-PGJ)

- 7 Eurocopter AS 355 Ecureuil 2 - 4 active and three permanently out of service, one of which was donated to the units ESIME Ticoman IPN institution with which the group has an agreement to provide its mechanics minor maintenance tasks. The other two aircraft are on the Technical Police Training Institute and at the base of Task Force for display purposes.
- 1 Bell 412 (XC-SPV)
- 2 Bell 206 (MDF XC, XC-PGJ)

In January 2015, the fleet has been renewed with five helicopters Bell:

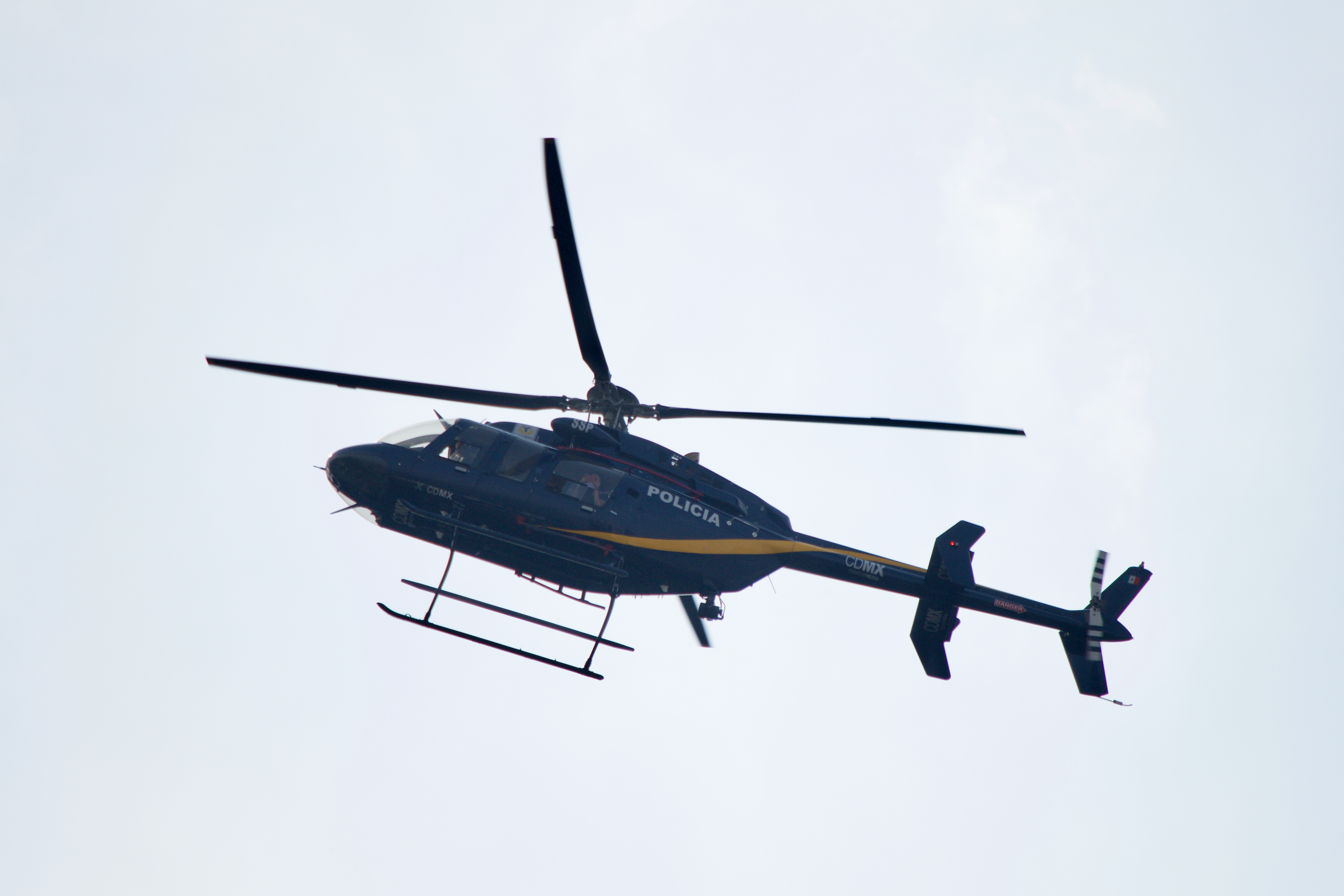
Bell 407 of the Condores Group

- 4 Bell 407GX (DSA-XC, XC-DMA-DMX XC, XC-HDF,)
- 1 Bell 429 GlobalRanger (XC-DMM)
