= Guardia di Finanza Air Maritime Exploration Squadron =

The Air–Sea Exploration Squadron (“G.E.A. – Gruppo Esplorazione Aeromarittima” in the original language) is a special flight squadron of the Italian Guardia di Finanza (often abbreviated in GdF). Its base is the military airport of Pratica di Mare, near Rome, and it's the only fixed-wing-aircraft flight squadron of the GdF Air Service. For this reason, it can be considered the diamond point of the long-range GdF air fleet.

== History ==
The air service of the Guardia di Finanza has its origins in 1911 when Guardia di Finanza officer Captain Luca Bongiovanni served with the Royal Italian Army's first aviation battalion. Over the following decades the contribution of Guardia di Finanza to military aviation units increased significantly. The need for a separate Guardia di Finanza air service was made necessary to combat rampant smuggling and was established on 1 February 1954. The first maritime patrols were made on air force Savoia Marchetti SM-82 and Fiat G-12 aircraft with Guardia di Finanza navigators on board.

== Official badge ==
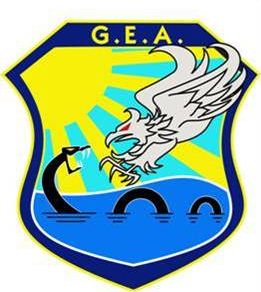
BY ROSTRUM AND TALON

The official badge represents the fight between the GdF Air Service (the Griffin, main symbol of the GdF all along) and the criminal organisations operating across the sea (the Hydra); the powerful yellow sunbeams symbolize light's superiority over darkness, that is the good victory against the evil.

== The motto ==
“Con il rostro e con l’artiglio!” (translated: “by rostrum and talon!”) is the GEA's motto, which can be referred to the Griffin as well: it's an encouragement to fight against the evil by every possible means (rostrum and talon are Griffin's infallible weapons). The GdF has used aircraft against maritime criminal organisations since the 1950s: the original Air Service had a helicopter – only air fleet. Year by year, though, the increasing operational aims in sea patrolling made a dedicated fixed – wing aircraft fleet necessary for the GdF. For this reason, on August 1, 1991, the Aviation Center Air Squadron was created, and Lt.Col. Antonino Sarica was designated as its first Commander. At first, the squadron fleet consisted only of Piaggio P166DL3 (accomplishing several high tasks as well), but the 1996 update introduced the ATR 42 MP, which was able to extend the squadron's operating range, in new international dimensions too. The squadron changed definitively its name in GEA on January 1, 2000. In January 2009 the squadron recently reached the 40.000 flight hours important goal: most hours are recorded as operational, and they led to a lot of police results, such as:

- seizing 77000 kg of drugs and dozens of tons of smuggled tobaccos
- spotting and rescuing hundreds of illegal immigrant ships
- detecting illegal waste dumps
- repressing sea – pollution phenomena

In February 2007, the GEA air fleet was furthermore updated, with the implementation of the Piaggio P180 as a fast strategic / tactical air transport, both within Italy and abroad. Col. PIL Camillo Passalacqua is the current GEA Commander.

== The air fleet ==
"P166 DL3"

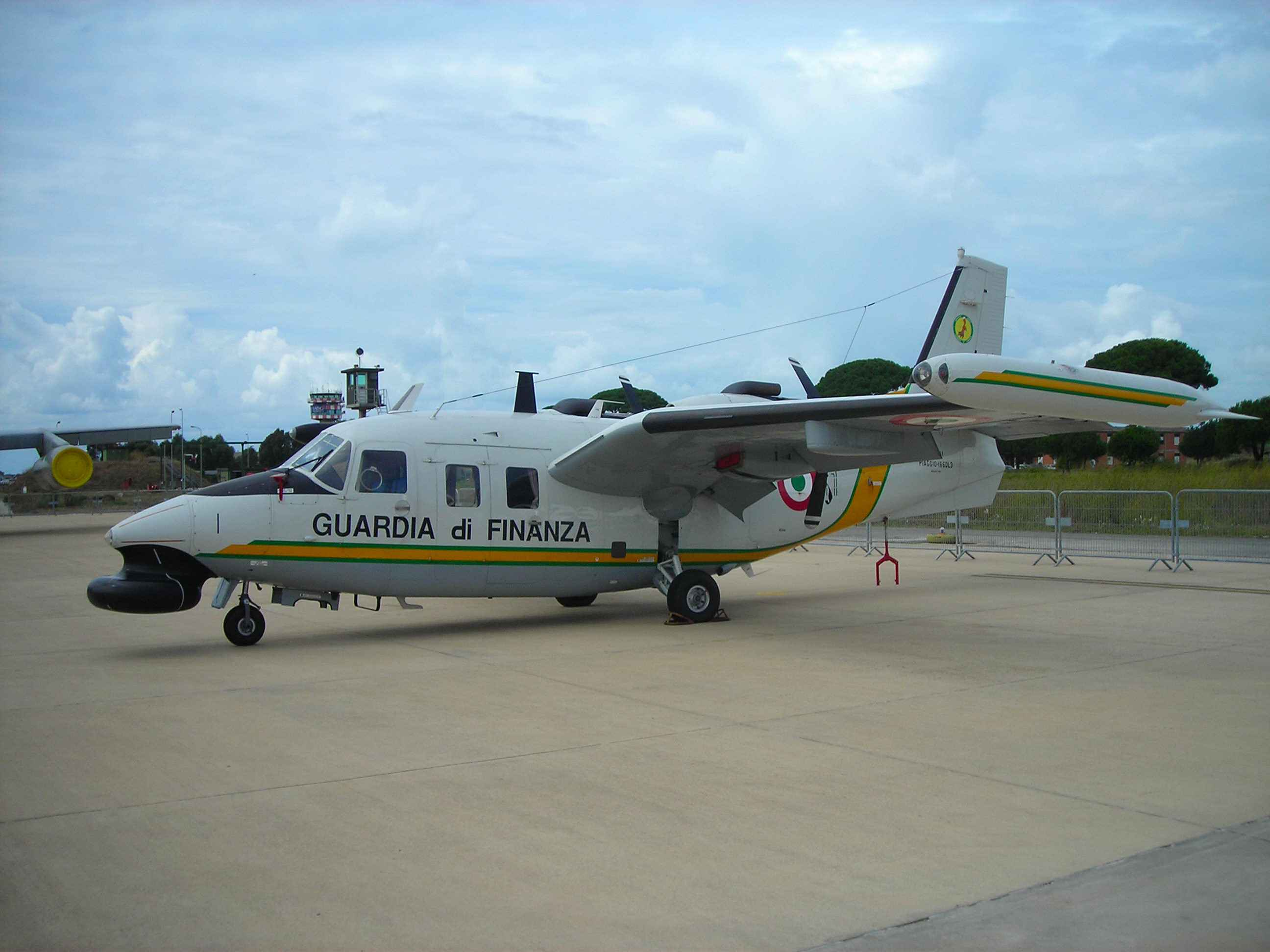
Piaggio P166-DL3

It was the first fixed-wing aircraft operating in the GEA in 1990, fully equipped with sea patrol sensors and systems. Today it is mainly used for training purposes: GdF military pilots complete their pilot school on this aircraft, at the ITAF 70° Wing.

Dimensions: wingspan 14.69 m, length 12.38 m, height 5 m, MTOW 4300 kg, weight capacity 1100 kg, crew 2 pilots / 1 system operator / 1 crew chief, passengers 8. Performances: service ceiling 24,000 ft, max cruising speed 225 kn, endurance 4 h / 720 NM.

"P166 DP1"

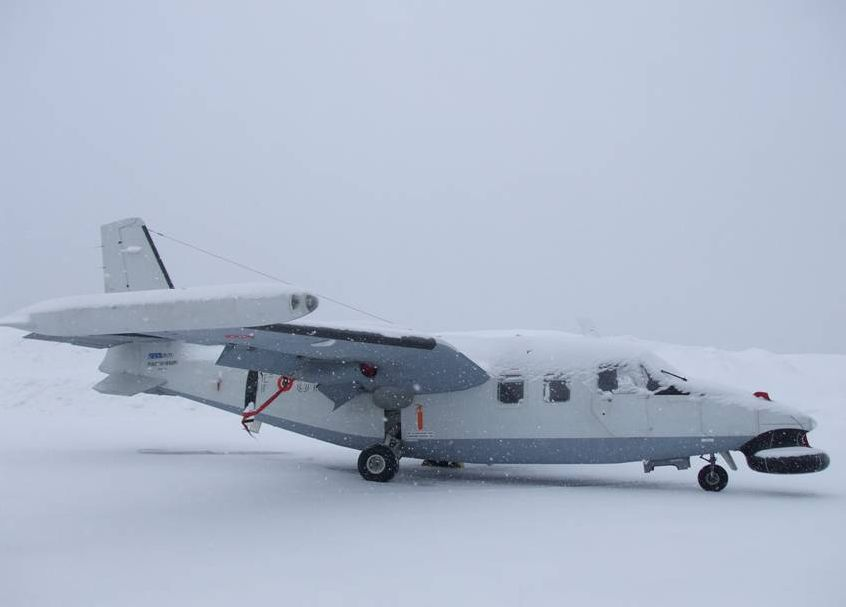
Piaggio P166-DP1

It's the P166 DL3 update result, with improved avionics, engines and mission systems. The estimated 4 years delivery will consist of 10 aircraft.

Dimensions: wingspan 14.69 m, length 12.39 m, height 5 m, MTOW 4500 kg, weight capacity 1390 kg, crew 2 pilots / 1 system operator / 1 crew chief, passengers 3. Performances: service ceiling 24,000 ft, max cruising speed 210 kn, endurance 5 h / 950 NM.

"ATR 42 MP"

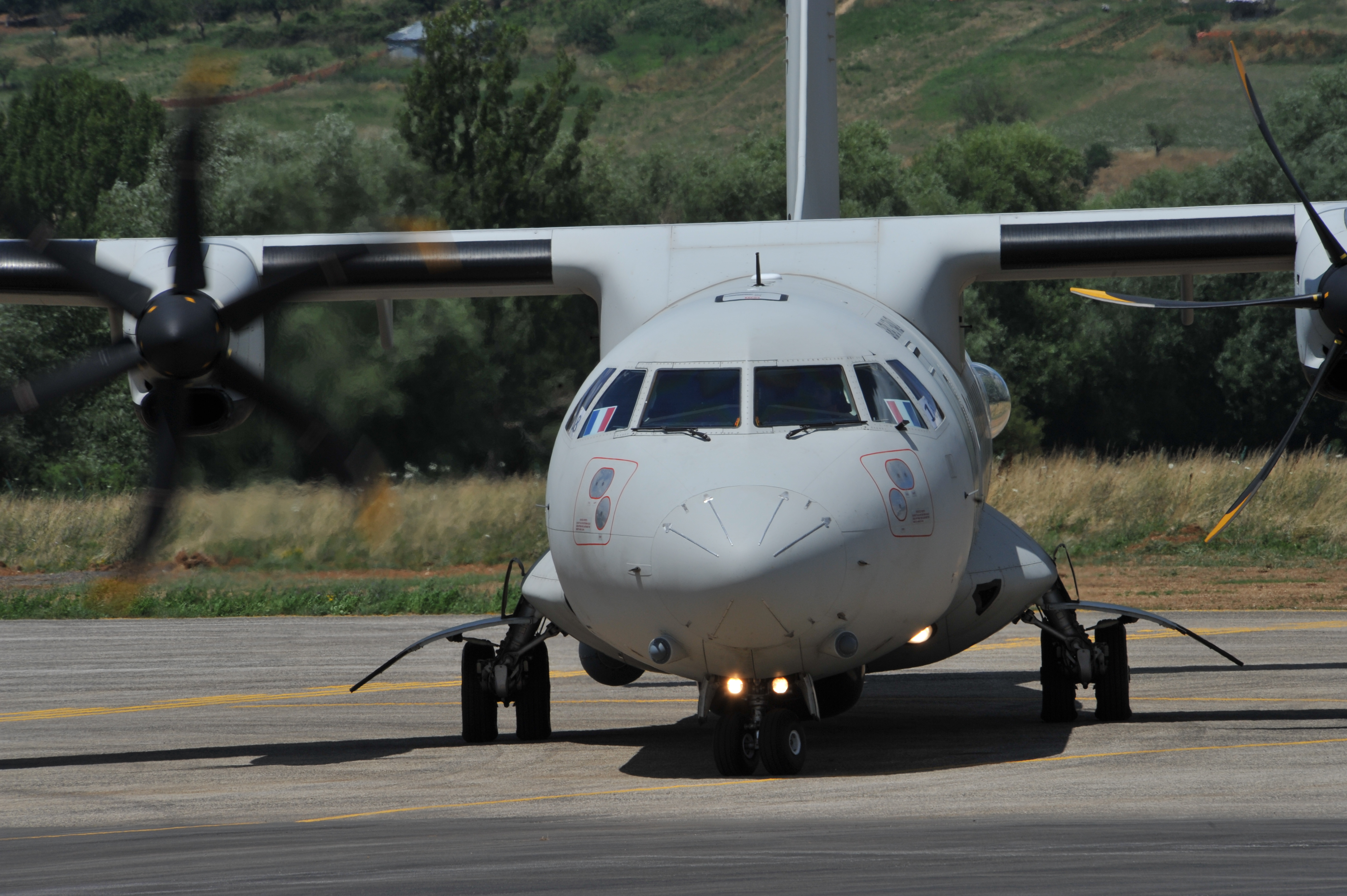
ATR 42-MP

It joined the GEA fleet in 1996, and it's the main vector for long range sea patrol. The GEA currently has 4 ATRs available, 2 of which are re-powered versions (ATR 42 MP 500), and can count on them for various tasks (patrol, transport, medevac, SAR) as they can be easily reset up. With its cutting edge systems (called ATOS), the ATR can investigate on ships without being seen.

Dimensions: wingspan 24.57 m, length 22.67 m, height 7.75 m, MTOW 18600 kg, weight capacity 4800 kg, crew 2 pilots / 2 system operators / 1 crew chief, passengers 48. Performances: service ceiling 25,000 ft, max cruising speed 250 kn, endurance 7 h / 1300 NM.

"P180 “AVANTI II"

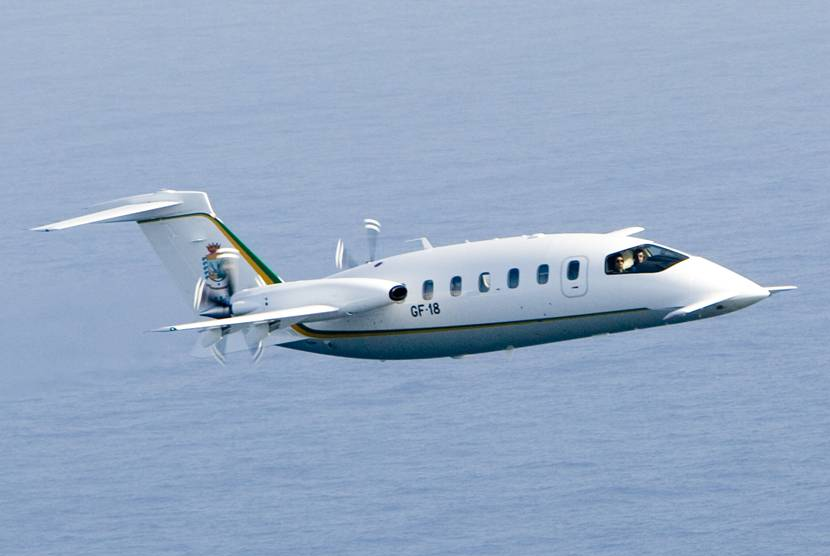
Piaggio P-180

It is the most recent aircraft in the GdF Air Service: the P180 had an enormous success in civil aviation for its high performance with minimums handling costs. It is equipped with cutting-edge avionics “Proline 21”, and the GEA has at its disposal 2 exemplars to use for tactical support in operations.

Dimensions: wingspan 13.84 m, length 14.41 m, height 3.98 m, MTOW 5232 kg, weight capacity 1919 kg, crew 2 pilots / 1 crew chief, passengers 9. Performances: service ceiling 41,000 ft, max cruising speed 350 kn, endurance 4 h / 1400 NM.

== Operations ==
Since the 1990s, the GEA has led the Italian Guardia di Finanza beyond the EU limits, accomplishing several missions including support of the other EU countries in patrolling their edges. Many national and international high personalities appreciated hard work and excellent results of the men on duty at the squadron. The results range from illegal immigration and unlawful traffic, to environmental police and humanitarian missions.

=== Illegal Immigration ===
The squadron's activity in this field took mainly place in Senegal for many years, with the so-called “HERA” international operation against illegal immigration from West African coasts to Canary Islands. This phenomenon is currently critical for the EU society and policy, but the GEA proved to be able to face it, meanwhile accomplishing humanitarian and rescue missions. In 2007, the squadron played a vital role in a complex operation called “CENGIZHAN”, which was the first case of an “immigration mother – ship” seizure.

=== Unlawful traffic ===
Every day, the GEA has to face the endless evolution of the criminal organisations. In international waters, huge foreign “mother ships” operate as fixed and untouchable warehouses, transhipping drugs and smuggled tobaccos on fast motorboats, so that they can “deliver” these illegal goods on Italian coasts, with minimal probability of being caught. The GEA fights against this criminal trick using the Right of Pursuit stated by the Montego Bay Convention (art. 111), this way it scored top results in this field, including:

- seizure of a motor ship and 2,935 kg of smuggled tobaccos (operation “JANET” – 1999);
- seizure of a fishing ship and 5,036 kg of drug (operation “TESTA ROSSA” – 2007);
- seizure of a yacht and 11,060 kg of drug, in cooperation with Spanish Police Forces (operation “VALIANT” – 2003);
- seizure of 4,166 kg of drug and 10 people arrested (operation “OMBRA”, entirely accomplished by GEA personnel).

Today, the Atlantic Ocean is part of operative scenery of Air Maritime Exploration Squadron in his fight against traffic of drug. Two important operations were completed last year, with the coordination of Maritime Analysis And Operation Center of Lisbon: the first, the historical "Operation Albatross", February 2009, ended with the seizure record of more of 5,500 kg of cocaine and the capture of 5 people; the second, "Operation Devop", December 2009, which allowed the capture of 7 people and the seizure of 1000 kg of cocaine, hidden on board the ship "Destiny Empress", a former Canadian Coast Guard Vessel previously known as the CCGS Parizeau.

=== Environmental Police ===
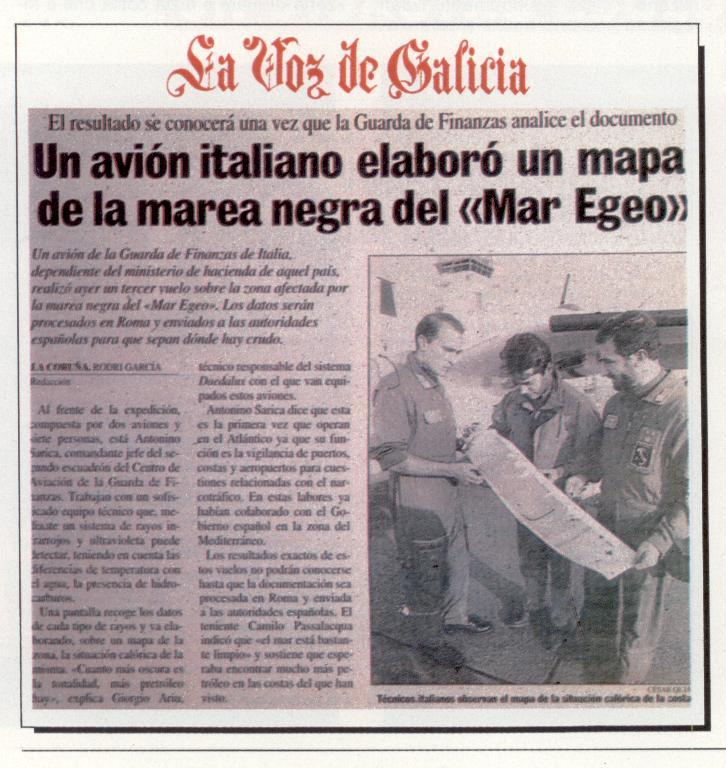
La Voz de la Galiz

The P166 DL3 is equipped with a special sensor, called “Daedalus”, which is able to lock heat and light reflection differences, indicating probable presence of polluting substance. As a good example of this capability, the GEA joined an international mission after the “Aegean Sea” tanker shipwreck, in 1992, playing a vital role in searching and finding oil-polluted areas.

=== Other activities ===
The GEA has at its disposal several "speciality instructors", who are pilots enabled to carry out young pilots' final training. Nowadays, with cost-control policies, pilots are "on-job trained"; that is, they complete their training while effectively flying operational missions. Because of the aircraft and system complexity, GEA personnel often join international shows (such as in Malaysia, France, UK, Malta), increasing the Italian Aeronautical industry international fame. These industries, as GEA pilots’ and operators' professional level is extremely high, often use them for test flights and certification activities, such as the temperature limits for P166 DP1 engine ignition test in Finland. In everyday activity, the squadron's activity ranges from police patrol to humanitarian missions, proving that the versatility is one of the best GEA's qualities, as a powerful means of protection of economical, financial and humanitarian interests of the European Union.
