= Italian Coast Guard Air Service =

The Italian Coast Guard Air Service (Italian: Servizio Aereo della Guardia Costiera) was established in 1989 by the Corps of the Port Captaincies – Coast Guard.

== List of Italian Coast Guard aircraft and helicopters ==
| Aircraft | Origin | Type | Picture | Versions | In service | Notes |
|---|---|---|---|---|---|---|
| AgustaWestland AW139 | (Italy) | search and rescue | | AW139 | 16 | MM81741 11-01 (cn 31293); MM81747 11-02 (cn 31303); MM81748 11-03 (cn 31313); MM81749 11-04 (cn 31329) |
| Agusta-Bell AB412 | (Italy) | search and rescue | | Delivered 4 AB412SP and 6 AB412HP | 0 | AB412SP: MM81382 9-01 (cn 25616); MM81383 9-02 (cn 25627); MM81384 9-03 (cn 25628); MM81385 9-04 (cn 25639); AB412HP: MM81473 9-05 (cn 25718); MM81474 9-06 (cn 25719); MM81476 9-08 (cn 25721); MM81511 9-09 (cn 25722); MM81512 9-10 (cn 25723) |
| Piaggio P.166 | (Italy) | maritime patrol | | P.166DL3 | 0 | Delivered 2 P-166 and 12 P-166DL3 |
| Piaggio P.180 | (Italy) | maritime patrol | | P.180 Avanti II | 1 | MM62274 12-01 (cn 1205) |
| ATR 42 | (Italy) (France) | maritime patrol | | ATR42MP | 3 | ATR42-420MP: MM62170 10-01 (cn 466); MM62171 10-02 (cn 615); ATR42-500MP: MM62270 10-03 (cn 803) |
