= Filton =

Town in Gloucestershire, England

Coordinates: 51.510°N 2.574°W

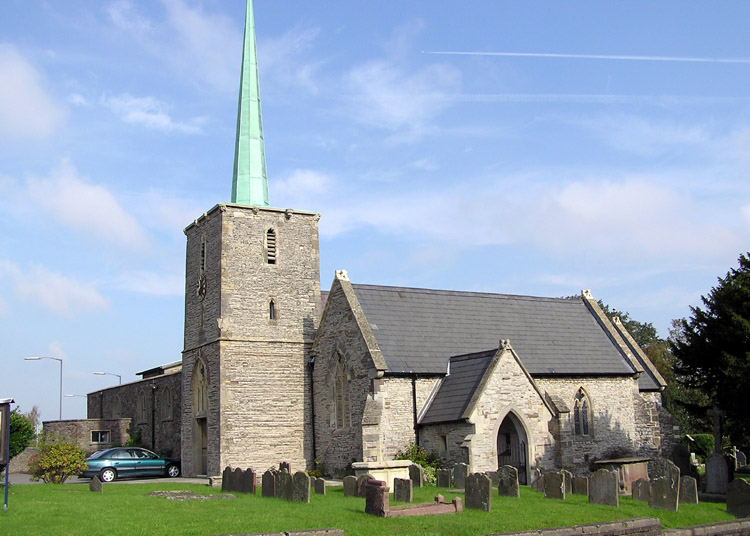
- St Peter's Church, Filton

- Location within Gloucestershire
- Interactive map showing the parish boundary
- Population: 11,295 (2021 census)
- OS grid reference: ST603792
- Civil parish: Filton
- Unitary authority: South Gloucestershire
- Ceremonial county: Gloucestershire
- Region: South West
- Country: England
- Sovereign state: United Kingdom
- Post town: Bristol
- Postcode district: BS7, BS34
- Dialling code: 0117, 01454
- Police: Avon and Somerset
- Fire: Avon
- Ambulance: South Western
- UK Parliament: Filton and Bradley Stoke
- Website: Filton Town Council

Filton is a town and civil parish in South Gloucestershire, England, 6 miles (10 km) north of Bristol. With neighbouring Patchway, Stoke Gifford and Bradley Stoke, Filton forms the North Fringe of Bristol – part of the Bristol urban area that has become an overflow settlement for the city. Filton's economy is linked to the aerospace industry and the former Filton Airport, which closed in 2012 and as of 2026 is a regeneration site of national significance.

== Etymology ==
The name Filton is derived from the Anglo-Saxon words fileðe (hay) and tūn (farmstead) meaning hay farmstead.

== Geography ==
As a civil parish, Filton is bound by the county boundary with Bristol in the south and west; to the north it stretches as far as Gipsy Patch Lane, taking in only the eastern end of the Filton Airport site; in the east, it largely follows the railway, with a deviation to take in Abbey Wood retail park. It borders the parishes of Charlton Hayes, Patchway, Stoke Gifford, and Stoke Park and Cheswick, and the Bristol wards of Lockleaze, Horfield, Southmead and Henbury and Brentry. The name Filton is often used to refer to a broader area than just the parish; for example, South Gloucestershire Council define an "Enterprise Filton" zone covering industrial and commercial areas of Filton, Patchway and Charlton Hayes, while the Office for National Statistics have used it to refer to the North Fringe area.

Districts within the town include East Filton, Filton Park and Northville. East Filton, which has grown up east of the Bristol-South Wales railway line and is mostly in the neighbouring civil parish of Stoke Gifford, contains the offices of the Ministry of Defence's Defence Procurement Agency, plus a shopping park. Filton Park is a suburb of Bristol and lies directly on the city border, sandwiched between the A38 trunk road and Southmead Road. Filton itself lies to the north and east of Filton Park. Monks Park is to the south. Housing in Filton Park is mainly privately owned, semi-detached and 1930s built. Pre-World War I properties in the district tend to be quite large, with generous gardens. Extensive playing fields border the north-western side of Southmead Road. The golf links, on the hillside beyond, is owned by Filton Golf Club. The area has a primary school and a playgroup. Filton Park is regarded as a desirable place to live since it is close to major centres of employment such as BAE Systems, and Defence Equipment & Support at Abbey Wood. As of 2026, the airport site is undergoing redevelopment as the new Brabazon neighbourhood, a nationally significant development of up to 40,000 homes.

== History ==
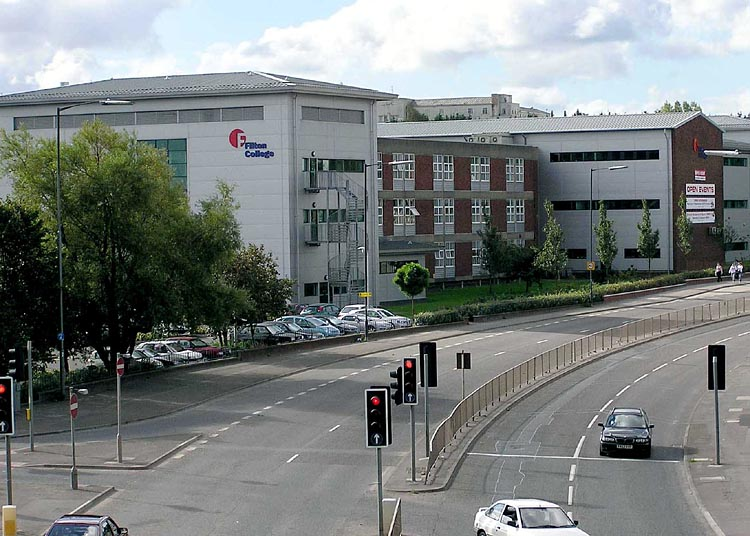
South Gloucestershire and Stroud College

Thousands of mites, farthings and other coins of the Roman emperors, Domitian, Constantine and Constans were found in a bank by some boys in 1880. Many of the coins were in excellent condition.

At the start of the 20th century, Filton was a small village, still detached from the city of Bristol to the south. Farming was the principal occupation. However, there was a large factory-like laundry in the village, opposite Filton House, owned by Samuel Shield. The Bristol to South Wales railway line passed through the village. There was a small station near the site of the current Abbey Wood station. A much larger railway station, known as Filton Junction, opened in 1910, after the alternate rail route from Bristol to London was finished. In 1907 the northern terminus for Bristol Tramways was moved out from Horfield to Filton. Tram production in the tramway sheds commenced in 1908. The manufacture of aeroplanes started in the Bristol Tramway sheds in 1910 and aero-engine production started in 1920.

Between the wars, Filton expanded rapidly to become a suburb of Bristol. Initially development (semi-detached housing) was concentrated on the western side of the A38 road, in an area known as Filton Park. In the 1930s, the area on the eastern side of the A38 started to be developed. Eventually, Filton became part of the Bristol conurbation, although it remained, as it does now, outside the city boundary. During the 1920s and 1930s, two infant/primary schools and one secondary school were built in Filton to accommodate the growing number of school-age children in the area. Many of these children were evacuated when World War II started in 1939, but returned later, during the Phoney War. Filton High School, originally a grammar school, but later a comprehensive, started to take pupils in 1960. In 2010 Filton High was demolished and replaced with Abbeywood Community School.

In the late 1940s, the main runway of Filton Aerodrome was greatly extended for the Bristol Brabazon project. Charlton village was demolished and the pre-war Filton bypass was severed. In the early 1960s, a new bypass was constructed, roughly parallel to the old one, and this later became part of the M5 motorway.

In the early 1950s the Bristol Aeroplane Company opened a purpose-built technical college to help train their apprentice intake. Attached to the college were also basic training workshops. In 1960 the education authority opened Filton Technical College on the opposite side of Filton Avenue to the BAC college. Later the various colleges merged and eventually became the South Gloucestershire and Stroud College.

Sandwiched between roads, factories, railway lines and the aerodrome, Filton expanded little after World War II. However, from the late 1970s a trading estate slowly developed on the eastern side of the Bristol/South Wales railway line in what is now known as East Filton. During the mid-1970s the A38 trunk road was upgraded to a dual carriageway. Station Road, a country lane in the early part of the 20th century, was also widened to become a dual carriageway and form part of the Avon Ring Road. In 1973, the Rolls-Royce car division was separated as Rolls-Royce Motors. Rolls-Royce (1971) Limited (the engine division) was privatised in 1987 as Rolls-Royce plc. Later, the Ministry of Defence set up a large office complex, known as Abbey Wood, in the same area.

== Industry ==
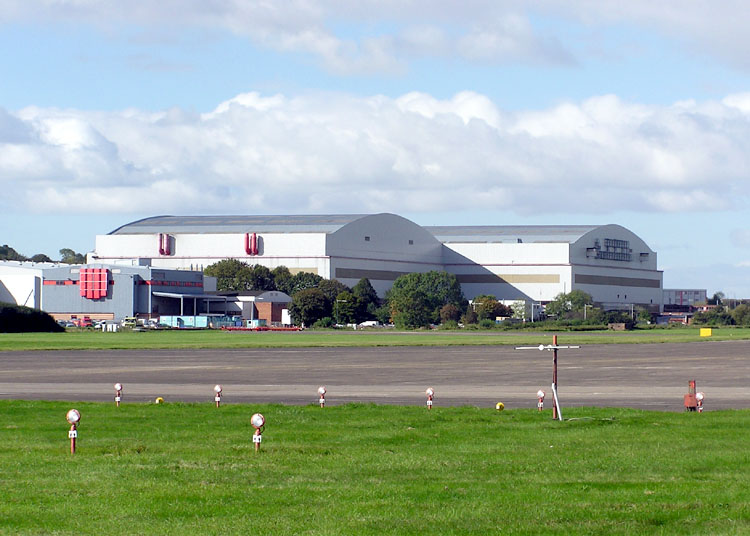
Aircraft Assembly Hall (AAH) on Filton Airfield. The Bristol Brabazon, Bristol Britannia and Concorde aircraft were constructed here.

Filton has an aerospace connection dating back to the establishment of the Bristol Aeroplane Company. Aerospace companies in Filton include BAE Systems, Airbus, GKN, Rolls-Royce and MBDA, all located around the former Filton Aerodrome. Airbus designs aircraft wings and conducts its Wing of Tomorrow and ZEROe research programs, and GKN builds wing spars and fixed trailing edge assemblies for the Airbus A350 at Filton.

The Concorde supersonic airliner was built here in the late 1960s and 1970s; on 26 November 2003 Concorde 216 (G-BOAF) made the final flight of a Concorde, returning to Filton to be kept there permanently as the centrepiece of the Aerospace Bristol museum, which opened in 2017. This museum also houses the Bristol Aero Collection and examples of planes, helicopters, missiles and other engineering projects built in Filton and Bristol.

Other employers include the MOD, Viridor, Hewlett-Packard, Hewlett Packard Enterprise and the Royal Mail. Filton is also home to the regional blood processing facility, NHS Blood and Transplant Filton.

Bristol Cars made hand-built luxury cars in Filton from 1946 until 2011. The company has neither distributors nor dealers and deals directly with customers; they have a showroom and head office in Kensington, London. They claimed to be the last wholly British-owned luxury car builder. The company went into administration in March 2011, and was acquired by the research and development firm Kamkorp.

== Demographics ==
The population of the parish at the 2021 census was 11,295.

Following the 2011 census, the Office for National Statistics (ONS) defined a Filton sub-division of the Bristol built-up area which covered the North Fringe of Bristol (including most of the urbanised parts of Almondsbury, Patchway, Little Stoke, Stoke Gifford and Bradley Stoke); this area had a population of 59,495 in 2011. Following the 2021 census, the ONS moved to a new definition of built-up areas and now define a contiguous built-up area within the parish, which had a population of 10,960 in 2021.

Census population of Filton parish
Census	Population	Female	Male	Households	Source
2001	9,861	4,908	4,953	4,167	
2011	10,607	5,162	5,445	4,514	
2021	11,295	5,384	5,911	4,591	

Filton is an ethnically diverse town, with a proportion of white British residents close to the national average.

Ethnicity 2011	Filton (parish)	South Gloucestershire
White British	80.1%	91.9%
Asian	8.0%	2.5%
Black	2.5%	0.8%

== Governance ==
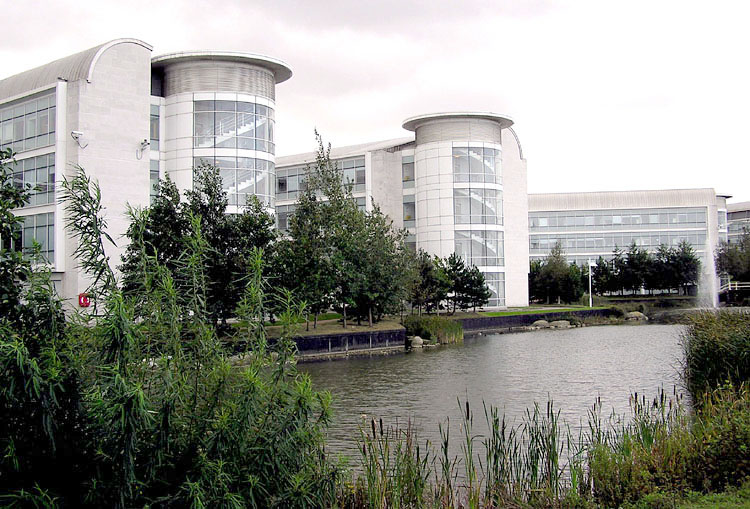
Part of the Defence Equipment and Support building at Abbey Wood, Filton. The site employs over 13,000 people, managing procurement contracts for the Navy, the Army and the Air Force.

Filton Town Council is a parish council made up of thirteen councillors and forming the first tier of local government.

At the upper tier of local government, Filton is in South Gloucestershire, a unitary authority. For elections to South Gloucestershire Council, it has an electoral ward with the same name and boundaries as the parish. It elects two members the council.

Filton is represented in the House of Commons by Claire Hazelgrove, Labour Member of Parliament for the constituency of Filton and Bradley Stoke.

Historically, Filton was in the Berkeley Hundred of Gloucestershire. In 1894 it became part of Chipping Sodbury rural district, which became the enlarged Sodbury rural district in 1935. In 1974, it became part of Northavon district in the newly formed county of Avon. When the Avon authority was abolished in 1996, the Northavon area became part of the new unitary authority of South Gloucestershire and rejoined the ceremonial county of Gloucestershire.

== Community facilities ==
Filton's educational facilities include South Gloucestershire and Stroud College, Abbeywood Community School and several primary schools. The University of the West of England is at nearby Frenchay.

Filton has two main shopping areas – the Shield Centre (on the site of the former Shield Laundry) and Abbey Wood Retail Park, as well as other shops.

Filton has large areas of open space which include several playing fields and a golf course. To the east of the town there is a small area of woodland known as Splatt's Abbey Wood.

== Landmarks ==
Filton Church was begun in around 1340 but is much altered.

== Transport ==
Filton can be reached from Junction 1 of the M32 motorway, or from Junction 16 of the M5 motorway.

The town is well served by rail with Filton Abbey Wood serving areas in the south of the town. Bristol Parkway and Patchway railway station, both in nearby Stoke Gifford parish, serve areas to the north and east. As of 2026, a new Bristol Brabazon railway station is under construction in nearly Patchway parish, on the south side of the airfield redevelopment.

== Sport ==
- The Bristol Academy of Sport is based at South Gloucestershire and Stroud College. Bristol City W.F.C. are based at the Stoke Gifford Stadium on site.
- Filton Cycling Speedway Club was formed in January 2006. The club uses a cycle track built by Filton Town Council and recognised to be one of the best in the country, with its setting in Elm Park.
- St Vallier FC (named after its French twin) is a youth football team.
- Filton Golf Club has an 18-hole course.
- There is also a table tennis club.

== Climate ==
Filton has a temperate maritime climate, with comfortable, mostly dry summers and cold, mostly wet winters. The temperature is usually between at or below freezing (0 °C (32 °F)) on 39.4 days per year and 23.1 °C (73.6 °F), but between 2005 and 2022, the temperature ranged from −6.7 °C (19.9 °F) to 35.5 °C (95.9 °F).

Climate data for Filton, (Note: Weather station is located 5 mi (8 km) from the Bristol city centre.) elevation: 48 m (157 ft), 1991–2020 normals, extremes 1958–present (Note: From 1958 to 2002, extremes were recorded at Long Ashton. Since 2002, extremes were recorded at Filton.)
Month	Jan	Feb	Mar	Apr	May	Jun	Jul	Aug	Sep	Oct	Nov	Dec	Year
Record high °C (°F)	14.7 (58.5)	16.7 (62.1)	21.7 (71.1)	25.7 (78.3)	27.5 (81.5)	32.8 (91.0)	34.7 (94.5)	33.2 (91.8)	28.4 (83.1)	26.8 (80.2)	17.5 (63.5)	15.5 (59.9)	34.7 (94.5)
Mean daily maximum °C (°F)	8.1 (46.6)	8.5 (47.3)	10.8 (51.4)	13.8 (56.8)	17.0 (62.6)	19.8 (67.6)	21.7 (71.1)	21.3 (70.3)	18.8 (65.8)	14.8 (58.6)	11.0 (51.8)	8.4 (47.1)	14.5 (58.1)
Daily mean °C (°F)	5.3 (41.5)	5.5 (41.9)	7.3 (45.1)	9.7 (49.5)	12.7 (54.9)	15.6 (60.1)	17.6 (63.7)	17.2 (63.0)	14.9 (58.8)	11.6 (52.9)	8.0 (46.4)	5.6 (42.1)	10.9 (51.6)
Mean daily minimum °C (°F)	2.4 (36.3)	2.4 (36.3)	3.7 (38.7)	5.5 (41.9)	8.4 (47.1)	11.4 (52.5)	13.4 (56.1)	13.2 (55.8)	11.0 (51.8)	8.3 (46.9)	5.1 (41.2)	2.8 (37.0)	7.3 (45.1)
Record low °C (°F)	−14.5 (5.9)	−10.2 (13.6)	−8.3 (17.1)	−4.1 (24.6)	−1.7 (28.9)	1.4 (34.5)	5.5 (41.9)	4.2 (39.6)	0.6 (33.1)	−3.4 (25.9)	−6.5 (20.3)	−10.5 (13.1)	−14.5 (5.9)
Average precipitation mm (inches)	82.9 (3.26)	57.9 (2.28)	53.3 (2.10)	47.9 (1.89)	57.8 (2.28)	56.3 (2.22)	58.7 (2.31)	75.1 (2.96)	64.3 (2.53)	85.5 (3.37)	90.0 (3.54)	89.9 (3.54)	819.0 (32.24)
Average precipitation days (≥ 1.0 mm)	13.1	10.4	10.4	9.9	10.3	9.7	9.8	11.0	10.4	12.8	14.6	13.5	135.8
Mean monthly sunshine hours	61.2	78.0	122.6	174.1	206.7	219.2	220.5	189.6	153.4	107.8	68.4	56.9	1,658.3
Source 1: Met Office
Source 2: Starlings Roost Weather

== Twin towns ==
Filton is twinned with St Vallier-sur-Rhône in France and Witzenhausen in Germany.
