= Western Counties Air Operations Unit =

The Western Counties Air Operations Unit was a joint consortium established to provide police aviation for Avon and Somerset Constabulary and Gloucestershire Constabulary. It was formed in August 1995, and operated a Eurocopter EC135 from Bristol Filton Airport.

In July 2013, the unit was subsumed into the National Police Air Service, subsequently moving to the nearby base of the Great Western Air Ambulance adjacent to the Almondsbury M4/M5 Interchange in South Gloucestershire.

== See also ==
- Police aviation
- Police aviation in the United Kingdom
