= Brabazon, Bristol =

Coordinates: 51.522°N 2.582°W

Brabazon
- Location within Gloucestershire
- Interactive map of Brabazon area
- Unitary authority: South Gloucestershire
- Ceremonial county: Gloucestershire
- Region: South West
- Country: England
- Sovereign state: United Kingdom
- Post town: Bristol
- Postcode district: BS34
- Dialling code: 0117
- Police: Avon and Somerset
- Fire: Avon
- Ambulance: South Western

Brabazon is a mixed-use development under construction on the former Filton Airfield in South Gloucestershire, England. The neighbourhood will be a new extension to the North Fringe of Bristol. The development is expected to deliver 6,500 homes, a 'town centre' with commercial and community facilities, transport infrastructure, and the 20,000-capacity Bristol Arena.

The site is split across the Almondsbury, Charlton Hayes and Filton parishes of South Gloucestershire, and a smaller area south of the local authority boundary in the City of Bristol district.

As part of the West Innovation Arc, it was one of seven locations selected in 2026 by the New Towns Taskforce for a new generation of new towns.

== Background ==
The former airfield site was earmarked by South Gloucestershire Council for 2,675 new homes. In 2015, YTL Corporation purchased the airfield site.

The 354-acre brownfield development will include, according to the original plans on YTL Developments' website:

- 2,675 houses
- 62 acres of employment space
- a mixed use town centre
- three new schools, doctors' and dentists' surgeries
- recreational spaces, sport and leisure facilities
- affordable housing to buy and rent
- a community centre, retirement/care provision and student housing
- Bristol Brabazon railway station on the Henbury Loop Line and a MetroBus route

In December 2021, YTL proposed to add 1,000 houses, more green space and some commercial development nearby the original site on the former Patchway Trading Estate.

== Construction ==
Rather than appointing an existing company as main contractor, YTL created a subsidiary, YTL Construction UK, to manage the development in-house, citing a desire to align incentives with its 'patient capital' investment strategy.

Construction on the first homes began in 2020, with the first residents arriving in 2021.

In January 2024, YTL obtained planning permission to build 1,500 student flats and 400 private homes to the south of the main development, near to the planned Bristol Arena and public transport links.

In March 2025, BAM Nuttall began construction of Bristol Brabazon railway station.

Work to convert the 1940s aircraft hangars into Bristol Arena began in autumn 2025.
