= Bristol Filton Airport =

Former airport of Bristol, England, United Kingdom (1915–2012)

Filton Airport Filton Airfield
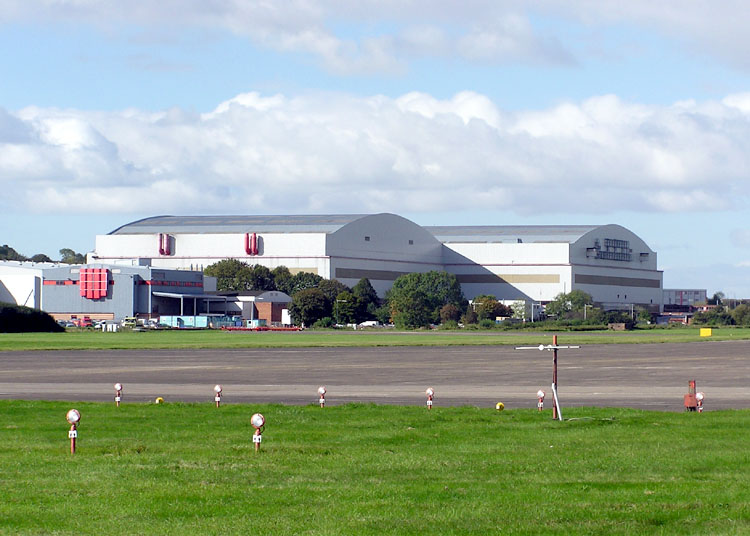
- IATA: FZO; ICAO: EGTG

Summary
- Airport type: Defunct
- Owner: BAE Systems Aviation Services Ltd
- Location: Filton, South Gloucestershire
- Opened: 1915
- Closed: 31 December 2012
- Elevation AMSL: 225 ft (69 m)
- Coordinates: 51°31′10″N 002°35′37″W

Map
- Location in Gloucestershire

Runways
Direction	Length		Surface
Direction	m	ft	Surface
~~09/27~~	~~2,467~~	~~8,094~~	~~Concrete~~ (Closed)
- Sources: UK AIP at NATS

Filton Airport or Filton Aerodrome (IATA: FZO, ICAO: EGTG) was a private airport in Filton and Patchway, within South Gloucestershire, 4.5 miles (7.2 kilometres) north of Bristol, England.

== Description ==
The airfield was bounded by the A38 road to the east, and the former London to Avonmouth railway line to the south. To the north it was bounded by the Filton Bypass. A major road now crosses this bypass, running across former airfield land and linking Filton and Patchway to Cribbs Causeway. The housing development of Charlton Hayes has been built on the section of the airfield that is in the town of Patchway.

The airfield had a United Kingdom Civil Aviation Authority Ordinary Licence (number P741) allowing flights for the public transport of passengers or for flying instruction as authorised by the licensee. Several private jets had the airfield as their home.

Filton's runway was wider than most, at 91 m (300 ft), and had a considerable length of 2,467 m (8,094 ft), having been extended for the maiden flight of the Bristol Brabazon airliner in 1949. Its size was beneficial in the late 1960s and early 1970s for development and manufacture of the supersonic Concorde.

Filton had a succession of owners. Following a review of its commercial viability, the last owners, BAE Systems Aviation Services Limited, decided to close the airfield for business effective 31 December 2012. BAE left the site, selling parts of the industrial buildings and land to Airbus, who have expanded their presence there. As of 2016, Airbus is the main company left on the site. Airbus has built new offices and refurbished one of the original, listed 'Aircraft Works' buildings, Pegasus House, as well as restoring the historic Filton House. Planning permission was granted for Airbus to build a new Engine Development Centre, and in 2016 for a new Wing Building and Wing Development Centre.

The regional West of England Royal Mail letter sorting depot was built on part of the airfield site approximately ten years before the airfield closed.

As of 2016, the only flights originating at Filton were from an area given to National Police Air Service for its helicopter and for an Air Ambulance helicopter operated by the Great Western Air Ambulance Charity, with both services then moving to a new base in nearby Almondsbury in October 2018.

== History ==
The manufacture of aeroplanes started in 1910, when Sir George White, the owner of Bristol Tramways, established the British and Colonial Aeroplane Company in the maintenance sheds of Bristol Tramways. A small 'flying ground' was set up opposite Fairlawn Avenue in 1911, at the top of Filton Hill.

=== First World War ===
The company grew rapidly during the First World War, building thousands of Bristol Fighters and other aircraft. In 1915, as the Aircraft Works expanded over the original flying area, the Royal Flying Corps established Filton Airfield in fields at the bottom of Filton Hill. Access was via the hamlet of Charlton. The hamlet was taken over by the War Office, with people being re-housed and most of the houses demolished, though some survived up until the airfield was closed and the land readied for the Charlton Hayes housing estate.

The First World War buildings on the military base were wooden huts, but eventually more permanent structures were erected, including Barnwell Hall. During the war, RFC Filton was mainly used as an aircraft acceptance facility.

A flying school was located beside the airfield runway, and the site eventually became part of the Engine Division of the Bristol Aeroplane Company.

=== Inter-war years ===
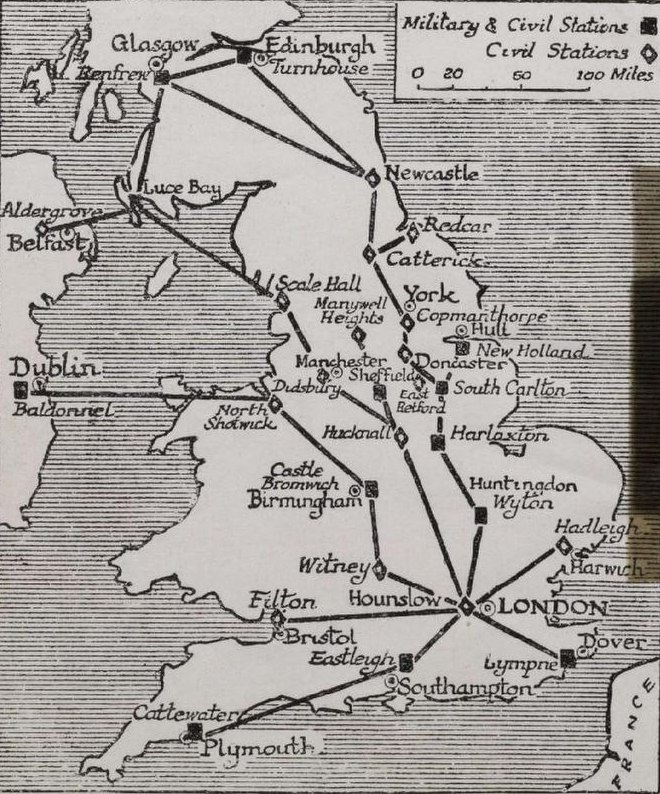
"Map of Air Routes and Landing Places in Great Britain, as temporarily arranged by the Air Ministry for civilian flying", published in 1919, showing Filton as a "civil station", with a connection to Hounslow, near London

Aero-engine production started close to Filton Airfield, with the acquisition of Cosmos Engineering in 1920. In the same year, the British and Colonial Aeroplane Company became the Bristol Aeroplane Company, often abbreviated to BAC. From 1929 the No. 501 (City of Bristol) Squadron RAF was based at RAF Filton. The squadron was equipped with Hawker Hurricanes by 1939 and formed part of the British forces sent to France.

=== Second World War ===
Before the Second World War, there were only grass runways at Filton. The re-armament programme from 1935 to the outbreak of war saw further expansion of the Bristol Aeroplane Company, and East Works on Gypsy Patch Lane and Rodney Works along Gloucester Road North were established for the production of aircraft engines.

Until the war, there was a belief that German bombers had insufficient range to reach Filton; however, the invasion of France by the Nazis in 1940 changed the situation. As war approached, anti-aircraft guns were set up in a field pasture on Filton Hill, next to Filton Golf Club, to defend the aircraft factories. On 25 September 1940, German aircraft, based in France, raided Filton, causing extensive damage to the aircraft factories, as well as heavy loss of life when several air-raid shelters were hit. In response, a squadron of Supermarine Spitfires was based at Filton. Before D-Day, US-manufactured aircraft were assembled at Filton Aerodrome, from assemblies imported via Avonmouth docks. Filton became a major port-of-entry for US casualties after the D-Day landings in June 1944, most of them taken to Frenchay Hospital. Aircraft produced at Filton during the war included the Blenheim, Beaufort, Beaufighter and Brigand. Filton Aerodrome was upgraded to a concrete runway during 1941/42.

=== Post war ===
After the Second World War, the concrete runway at Filton Aerodrome was extended westwards by John Laing & Son to enable the huge Bristol Brabazon airliner to take off safely. This extension required demolition of the hamlet of Charlton; it also severed the pre-war Filton bypass. The three-bay Brabazon Aircraft Assembly Hall (AAH) was built in the late 1940s under the direction of T. P. O'Sullivan. The hangar doors and the railway level crossing for the aircraft were the largest in the world at the time. After a worker was crushed and killed while taking a sleep in one of the folds of the hangar doors, a siren was installed to warn employees when the doors were being operated.

During the late 1940s and early 1950s, BAC branched out into the development and production of pre-fabricated buildings, plastics, helicopters, guided weapons, luxury cars, gas turbines and ramjet motors. The Bristol Britannia (Whispering Giant) airliner and Bristol Freighter were produced.

In 1948, 501 Squadron was equipped with De Havilland Vampire jets. These were a common sight in the skies around Filton in the early to mid-1950s. 501 was disbanded on 3 February 1957. As a protest, one of the pilots flew his aircraft under the Clifton Suspension Bridge, but he crashed into a hillside on the Leigh Woods side of the Avon Gorge, near Sea Mills, Bristol, and was killed.

During the late 1940s and early 1950, British Overseas Airways Corporation (BOAC) flew their Lockheed Constellations and Boeing Stratocruisers into Filton to be serviced in the newly completed Brabazon Hangar, then the largest hangar in the world. Maintenance flights to Filton ceased when suitable hangars were completed at London Heathrow Airport. In 1954, BAC opened a technical college for apprentices and trainees at the bottom of Filton Hill. This was eventually absorbed by Filton Technical College, that had opened on the opposite side of Filton Avenue in 1961. In 1958, the aero engine interests of the Bristol Aeroplane Company and Armstrong Siddeley were amalgamated to form Bristol Siddeley Engines. Rolls-Royce purchased Bristol Siddeley Engines in 1966. On 4 February 1971, Rolls-Royce were declared bankrupt due to the burden of development of the RB211 engine for the Lockheed L-1011 Tristar jetliner. Due to the importance of Rolls-Royce engine division to the Royal Air Force, the Government nationalised the company. Frederick Corfield the then local MP, was then Minister for Aviation, and presumably had influence over what was an unusual decision for a Conservative administration.

In 1960, the British Aircraft Corporation took over the aircraft interests of the Bristol Aeroplane Company. In 1960 an RAF Vulcan bomber, approaching from the west, landed at Filton in heavy rain. The pilot braked, but started to aquaplane. He decided to abort the landing. Although he managed to take-off and eventually land successfully elsewhere, the jet blast from the aircraft's four Bristol Siddeley Olympus 201 engines severely damaged a filling station at the eastern end of the runway, sent cars spinning on the A38 trunk road and wrecked the boundary fence steel railings. Eyewitnesses claimed that the aircraft barely cleared the engine test beds next to the Bristol to South Wales railway embankment. Subsequently, the filling station was moved further north, to a safer location. In the early 1960s a new Filton bypass was constructed, roughly parallel to the old one, and this later became part of the M5 motorway. The 1960s and 1970s saw the development and production of Concorde at Filton and a further extension of the Filton runway. The first flight of the Concorde 002 prototype took place on 9 April 1969 at Filton Aerodrome. All other British-built Concordes also used the main Filton runway for their first flights. Because of jet blast, gates and traffic lights were installed to close off the A38 road when Concorde took off. A few Lightning fighters were produced during this period.

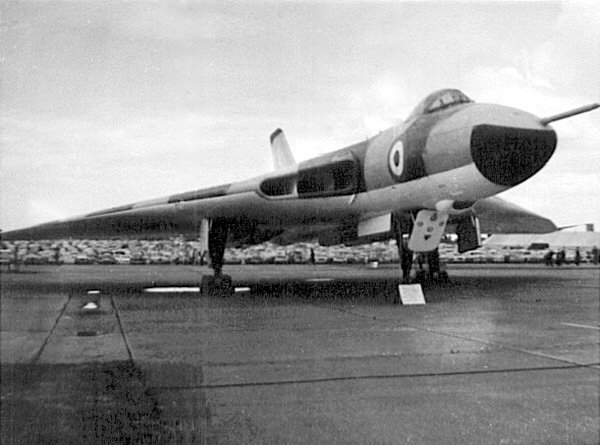
An Avro Vulcan B1A V bomber parked on one of the rapid dispersal points at Filton during a public air display in the 1960s

The length of the runway and its closed-to-passengers status made it an ideal dispersion site for the nation's airborne nuclear deterrent during the Cold War. During the Cuban Missile Crisis in February 1962, Vulcan Bombers were stationed at the airfield, on short-notice stand-by. On 3 December 1962, Bristol Siddeley Engines were using Vulcan XA894 as a flying test bed for the Olympus 22R, which was designed to power the ill-fated BAC TSR-2 bomber. On that day, the aircraft was positioned at Filton on an apron near the former RAF station, with the 22R discharging its exhaust into a de-tuner. The power was increased to maximum reheat. An LP turbine disc was ejected from the engine, rupturing two fuel tanks and starting a fire. A new fire truck positioned in front of the aircraft was quickly enveloped in flames. The fire took hold so quickly that there was little the fire crew could do. Both the aircraft and fire truck were destroyed. The test engineers managed to exit the aircraft and there were no significant casualties.

After the disbanding of 501 squadron, Bristol Siddeley Engine apprentices and British Aircraft Corporation apprentices used Barnwell Hall, the former RAF Officers Mess, for accommodation. The Bristol University Air Squadron continued to use some of the RAF facilities. Nowadays, many of the RAF buildings are derelict and Barnwell Hall has been demolished. For many years a surplus Concorde, G-BBDG, was housed in one of the hangars and cannibalised for spares by British Airways; following the decommissioning of Concorde, it was moved to the Brooklands Museum and restored. A further downhill extension to the main runway was made for the Concorde project in the late 1960s. There was also a shorter concrete runway at Filton with a roughly north–south orientation, which was sometimes used by a Dakota to ferry key BAC personnel to Fairford during Concorde development in the early 1970s. This has now been demolished for the Charlton Hayes housing development.

=== 1977 onwards ===
In 1977, British Aerospace, who owned a share in what became Airbus, had a major share of the site. Work undertaken included production of components for BAe 146 and Airbus aircraft. During the late 1990s and up to 2010 Douglas DC8 and Airbus A300 B4 aircraft flew regularly in and out of Filton. Airbus A300 B4 aircraft would be lined-up, awaiting conversion from passenger to freight use by BAE Systems. Boeing 747-200 maintenance was also undertaken. In 2002 BAE Systems left civil aircraft development and manufacture, to reorganise into a military manufacturer of aircraft, ships and other military products. Airbus continues on the site. The runway will be lost under housing developments.

On 26 November 2003, Concorde 216 (G-BOAF) made its last flight, and also the last flight by any operational Concorde. It flew from Heathrow, passing over the Bay of Biscay before making several low passes over Bristol, including over the Clifton Suspension Bridge where crowds had gathered, before landing at Filton. A new museum, Aerospace Bristol, opened in 2017 to the north of the old runway. This followed the closure of a previous visitors centre in 2010 after a fatal accident in which a man fell from a walkway. Concorde is one of the exhibits in the Bristol Aero collection.

On 21 November 2006, a public inquiry meeting was held with South Gloucestershire Council to discuss the building of 2,200 homes on the airfield (Patchway section). The first residents moved in to Charlton Hayes in October 2010.

The aircraft interests of the formerly named British Aircraft Corporation (BAC) are now owned by Airbus, GKN and BAC rebranded as BAE Systems, whilst the aero engine facilities are part of Rolls-Royce. MBDA owned the guided weapons facilities.

Refurbishment by Airbus of Filton House and Pegasus House (both Grade II listed buildings), as part of a new major office complex, was completed in 2013. Pegasus House, also known as New Filton House, was reopened by the Duke of Gloucester after standing vacant for 20 years. Built in 1936 as headquarters for the Bristol Aeroplane Company, the large Art Deco office building has sculptures, plaster panels and foyer flooring by Denis Dunlop.

Next to the A38 road, Airbus UK purchased 26 acres (110,000 m^{2}) of the former Rolls-Royce Rodney Works in order to build a facility for wing development and manufacture, which was completed following the granting of planning permission by South Gloucestershire Council in 2016.

=== Closure ===
Sections of the land that made up Filton Airfield were sold by BAE Systems for £120 million.

=== Revival ===
In late 2017, several hangars were re-opened as Aerospace Bristol, a museum about aerospace and the heritage of aerospace manufacturing in Bristol, including a purpose-built hangar for Concorde G-BOAF, the last Concorde to be built at Filton.

In 2026, the American Institute of Aeronautics and Astronautics Historic Aerospace Sites programme recognised Filton Airfield for its "extraordinary contribution" to aviation since 1910.

== Current situation ==
The former airfield site has been earmarked by South Gloucestershire Council for 2,675 new homes. This new suburb, to be called Brabazon, is being developed by YTL Corporation and began construction in 2020 with the first residents arriving in 2021. As of 2023, parts of the old runway have already been dug up, and construction on areas that were formerly taxiways and aprons is well underway, as the development continues. Aviva Arena and Bristol Brabazon railway station are being built on the site.

== Units ==
The following units were here at some point:

- No. 2 Aircraft Preparation Unit
- No. 2 Elementary and Reserve Flying Training School RAF
- No. 2 Elementary Flying Training School RAF
- No. 2 Ferry Pilots Pool RAF
- No. 2 Overseas Aircraft Preparation Unit
- No. 7 Radio Maintenance Unit
- No. 7 Radio Servicing Section
- No. 8 Anti-Aircraft Co-operation Unit RAF
- No. 10 Group Anti-Aircraft Co-operation Flight
- No. 10 Group Target Towing Flight
- No. 12 Reserve Flying School RAF
- No. 15 Ferry Unit RAF
- No. 19 Squadron RAF
- No. 20 Squadron RAF
- No. 25 Squadron RAF
- No. 33 Squadron RAF
- No. 42 Squadron RAF
- No. 62 Squadron RAF
- No. 66 Squadron RAF
- No. 101 Squadron RAF
- No. 110 (Anti-Aircraft Co-operation) Wing
- No. 118 Squadron RAF
- No. 236 Squadron RAF
- No. 263 Squadron RAF
- No. 286 Squadron RAF
- No. 501 Squadron RAF
- No. 504 Squadron RAF
- No. 528 Squadron RAF
- Bristol UAS
- Centaurus Flight

== Images ==
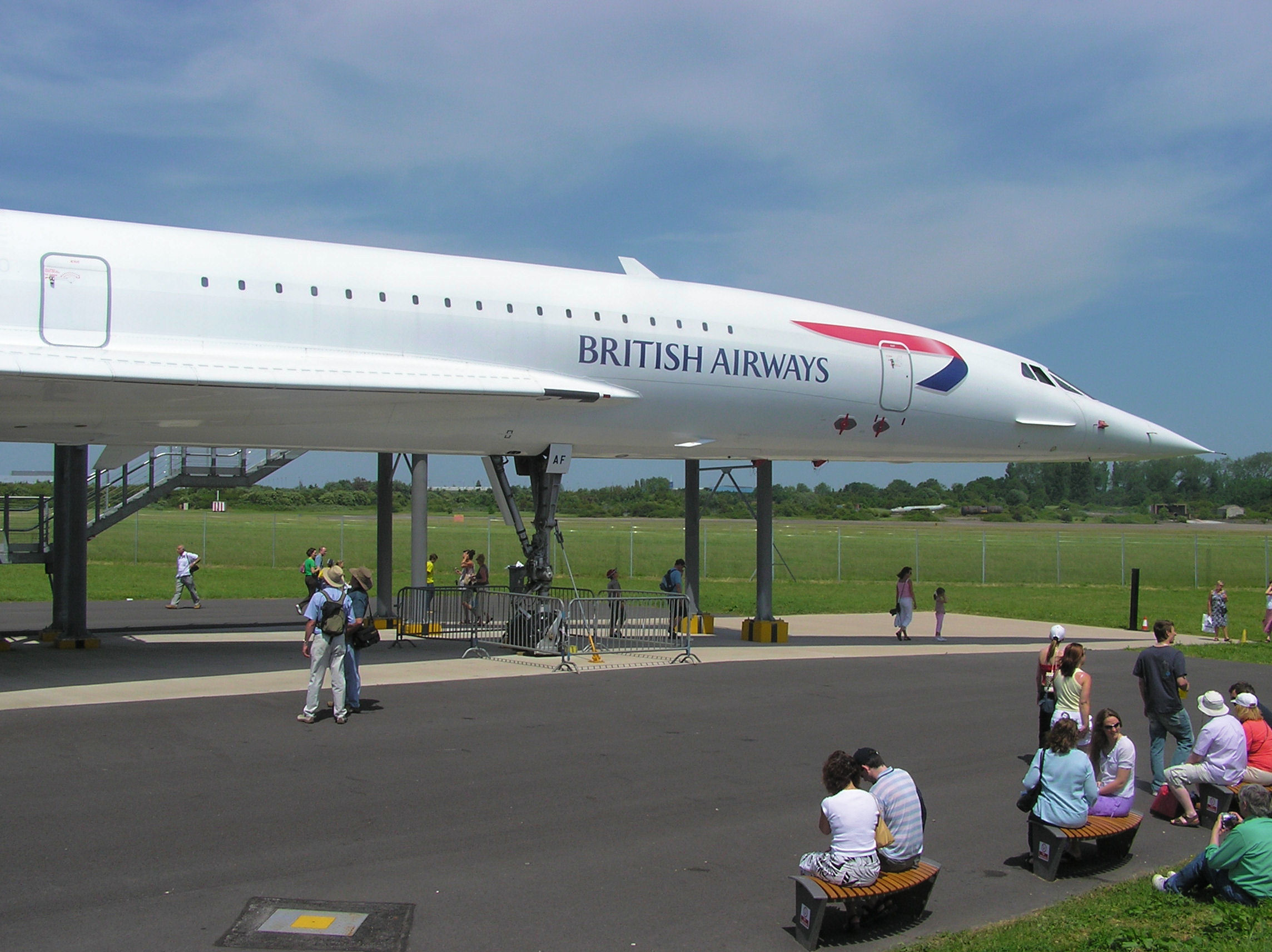
A preserved ex-British Airways Concorde at Filton Airfield. The plane has since been moved to Aerospace Bristol, where it can be accessed by the public.

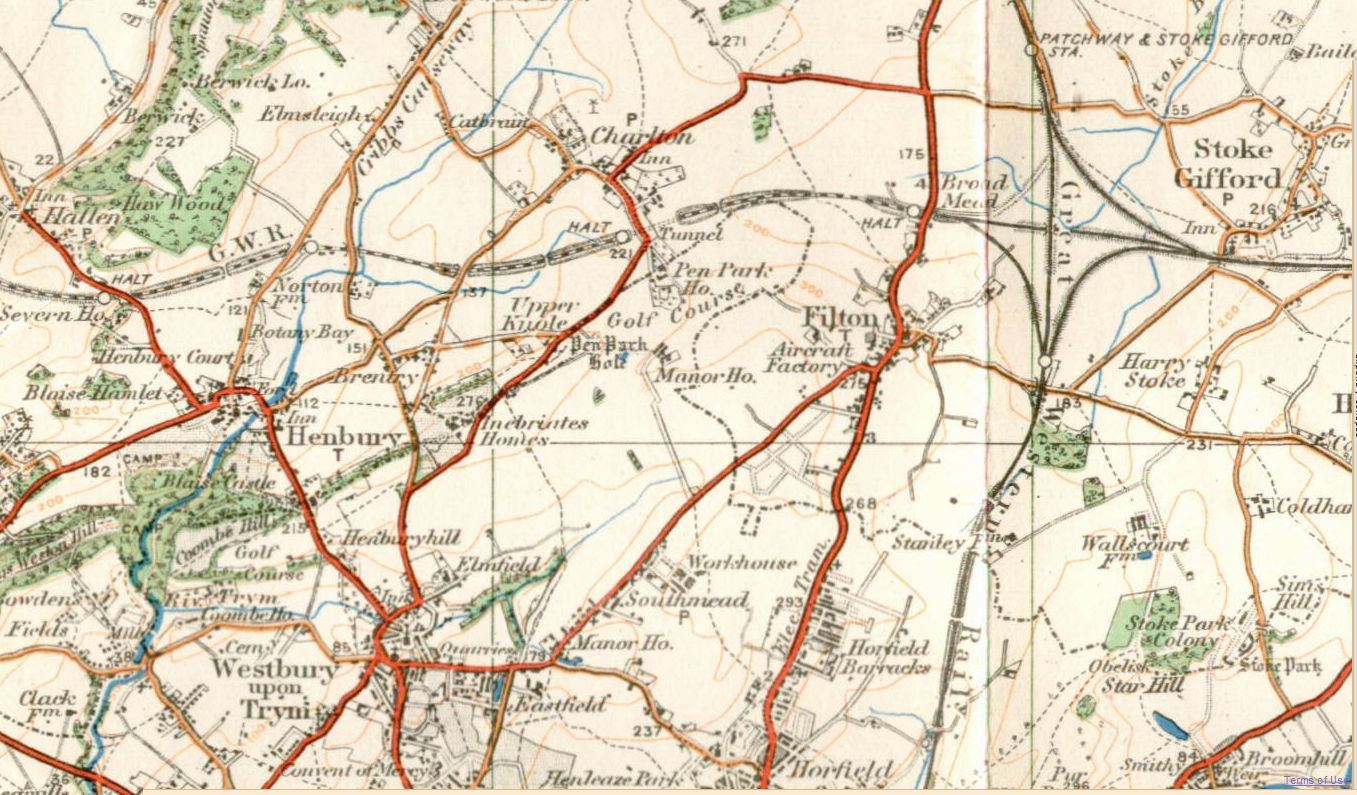
The area round Filton near Bristol in England as about 1935

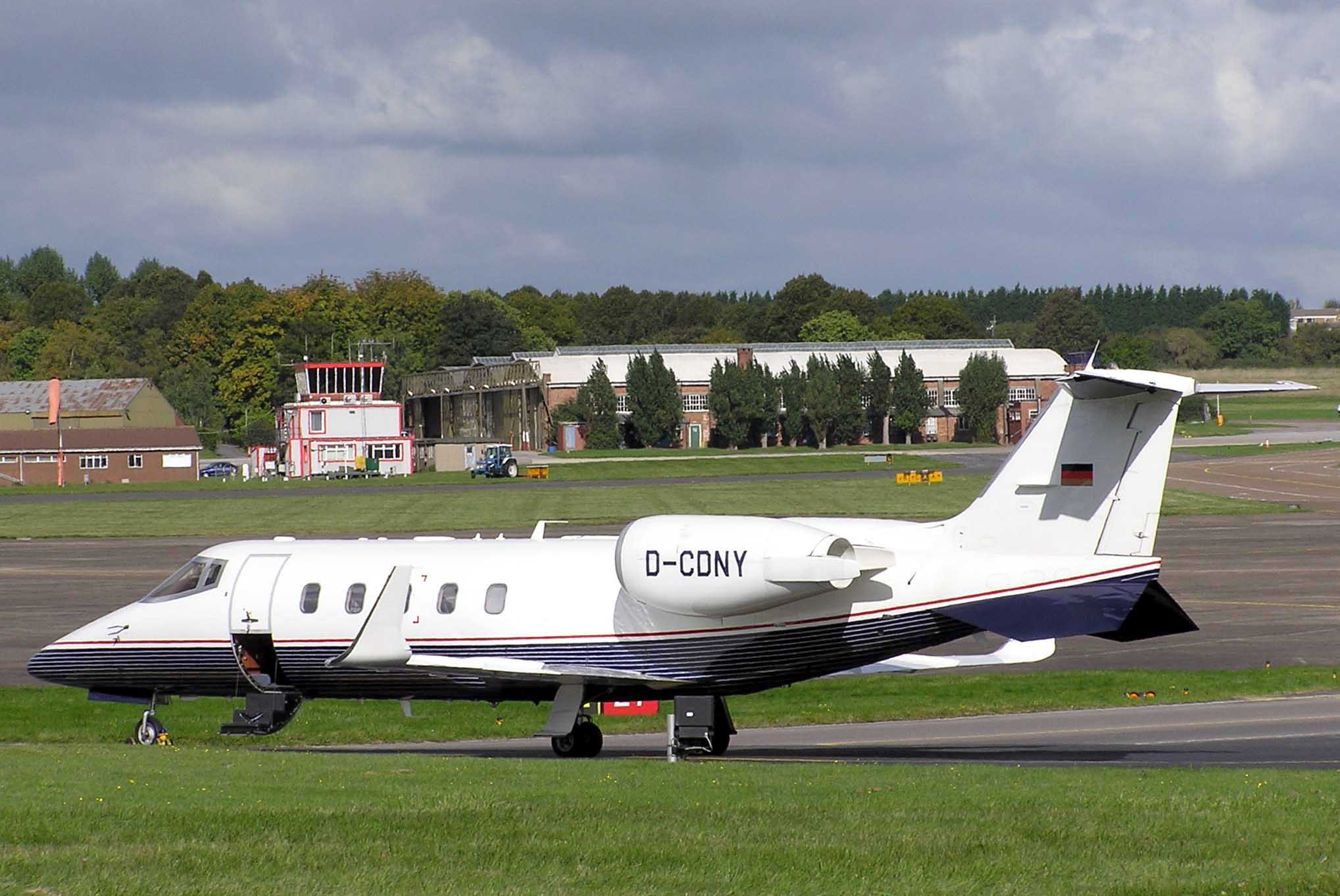
The control tower and a visiting Learjet 60 business jet

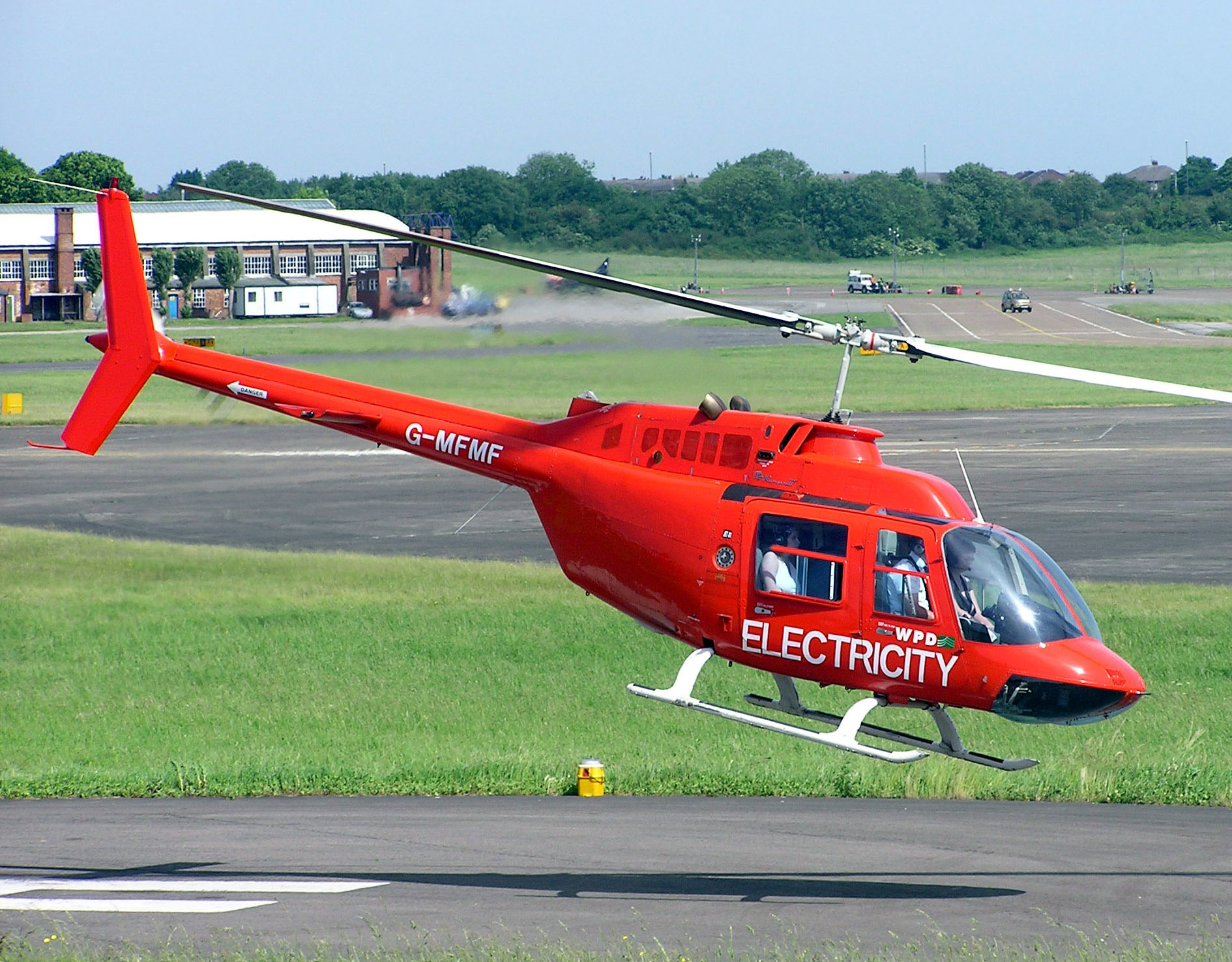
A Bell 206B Jet Ranger III in 2006, stationed at Filton for electricity pylon patrols

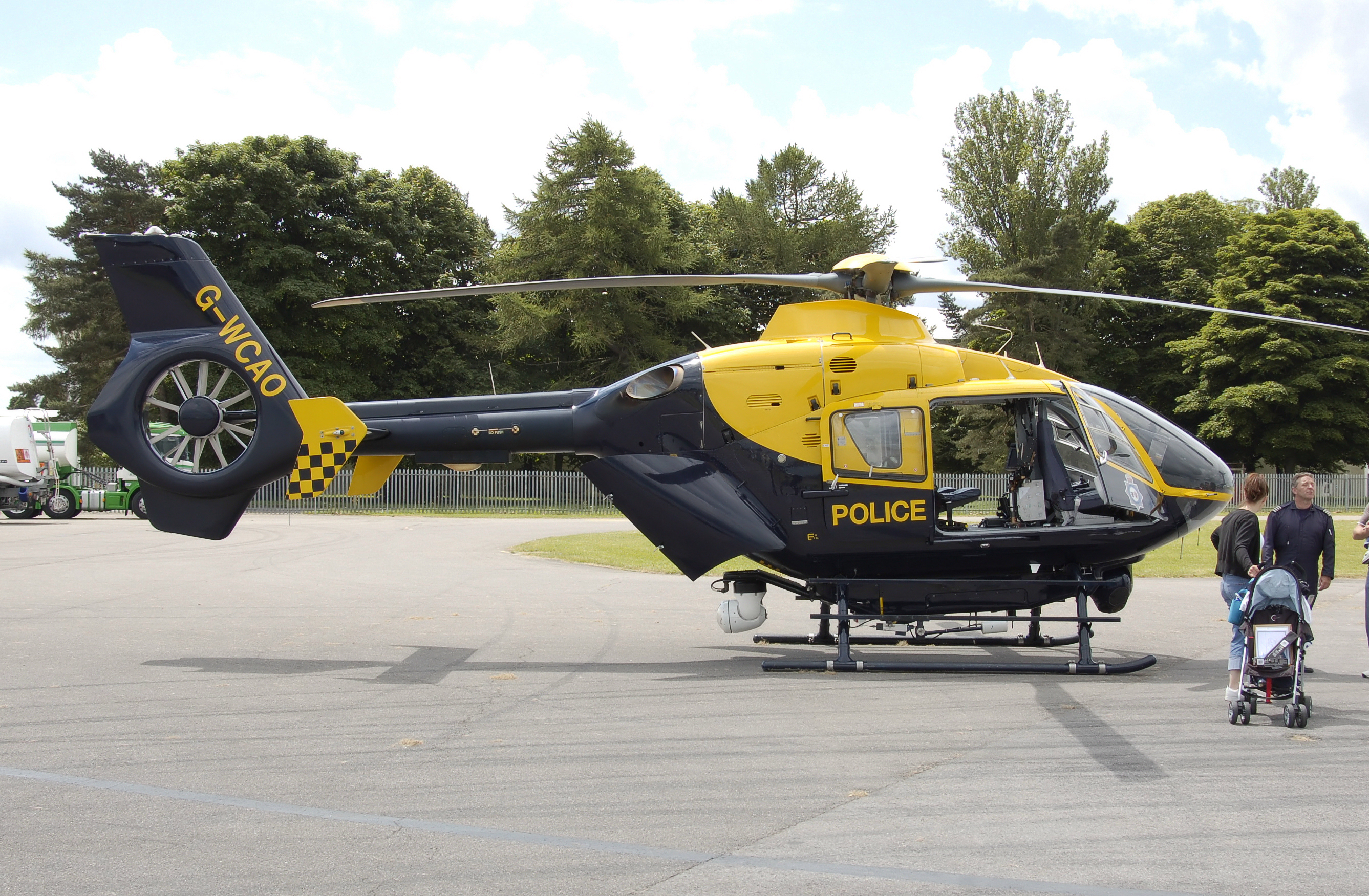
The Western Counties Air Operations Unit Eurocopter EC 135 T2 providing law enforcement and medical assistance in the Avon and Somerset Police, and Gloucestershire Police areas, was based at the airport. This role has since been taken up by the National Police Air Service.

== Bibliography ==
- Appleton, Andrew (2013). Filton Airfield Through Time. Amberley. ISBN 9781445623436.
- Ashworth, C (1990). Action Stations: Vol 5. Military airfields of the South West. Wellingborough: Patrick Stephens Limited. ISBN 978-1852603748.
- Ritchie, Berry (1997). The Good Builder: The John Laing Story. James & James. ASIN B005OPXPD0.
- Jefford, C G (1988). RAF Squadrons. A comprehensive record of the movement and equipment of all RAF squadrons and their antecedents since 1912. Shrewsbury: Airlife. ISBN 978-1853100536.
