= Charlton Hayes =

Coordinates: 51.526368°N 2.580757°W

- Civil parish
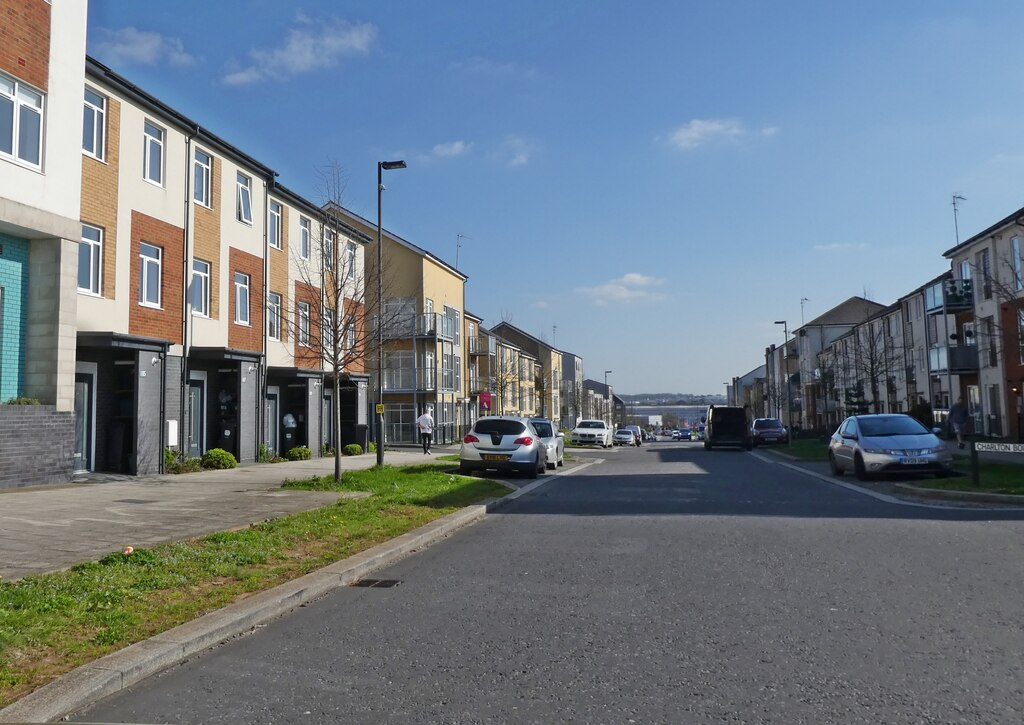
- Charlton Boulevard

- Location within Gloucestershire
- Interactive map showing the parish boundary
- OS grid reference: ST597810
- Unitary authority: South Gloucestershire
- Shire county: Gloucestershire
- Ceremonial county: Gloucestershire
- Region: South West
- Country: England
- Sovereign state: United Kingdom
- Post town: Bristol
- Postcode district: BS34
- Police: Gloucestershire
- Fire: Gloucestershire
- Ambulance: South Western

Charlton Hayes is a mixed-use development and civil parish in the South Gloucestershire district of Gloucestershire, England. Part of the suburban North Fringe of Bristol, it is located 5 miles (8.0 km) north of Bristol city centre on land north of the old Filton Airfield formerly in the parish of Patchway. Charlton Hayes was named after the village of Charlton, which was demolished in the late 1940s to make way for the Filton Airfield runway extension. The civil parish also includes part of the newer Brabazon development.

== Development and construction ==
Planning permission was granted by South Gloucestershire Council in 2008 to build 2,200 homes for 6,000 residents. The development includes 1, 2, 3 and 4 bedroom homes, three car dealerships, a nursery, a primary school, care homes, and a new bypass 'Hayes Way'. The development was funded by Bovis Homes who made a contribution to the Hayes Way construction.

The old Benson Brothers sites is now home to a police station for Avon and Somerset Police. The Vauxhall dealer at the flyover bought a row of old houses and converted the area into a car park. On 1 April 2023 Charlton Hayes became a civil parish, having been part of Patchway.

== Governance ==
Charlton Hayes is part of the Charlton and Cribbs ward of South Gloucestershire Council. It is currently represented by one Labour and two Conservative Councillors:

Councillors representing Charlton and Cribbs ward
Election	Councillor	Party	Votes
2023	Sam Scott	Labour	695
2023	Sanjay Shambhu	Conservative	683
2023	Jo Buddharaju	Conservative	614
2019	Sanjay Shambhu	Conservative	520
2019	Jo Buddharaju	Conservative	511
2019	Brian Hopkinson	Conservative	497

=== Parish ===
A new parish named Charlton Hayes was formed in May 2023. The campaign to form a new parish was led by local Conservative district councillors Sanjay Shambhu, Brian Hopkinson and Jo Buddharaju.

The parish has nine councillors, for 2023–2027 these are:

- Sanjay Shambhu, Conservative (Chairman, 2023–2024)
- Roberto Cialfi, Conservative
- Jo Buddharaju, Conservative
- Jo Oyekoya, Conservative
- Jack Groenewald, Conservative
- Dee Hasan, Conservative
- Sam Scott, Labour
- Dailey Lawrence, Labour
- Natalie Field, Labour

Before 2023, Charlton Hayes was in Patchway civil parish, and was part of the Callicroft ward for elections to the town council.

== Economy ==
A Ford dealership operates there. Other construction companies and housing associations are building houses.

== Transport ==
The main Hayes Way dual carriageway is interspersed by three roundabouts, named after the aeroplanes Concorde, Brabazon, Blenheim. The Highwood Road junction now goes into Wood Street, where many residents live. The Concorde Roundabout loops back to the A38 road back towards the M5 motorway. Hayes Way links A38 to Merlin Road and Highwood Road at the bottom of The Mall, Cribbs Causeway. The by-pass was designed to relieve congestion on Highwood Road, which is now restricted to public transport.

Highwood Road controversially closed in October 2012 for a trial period. LED road signs and threats of police enforcement to remove unauthorised traffic began in 2013.

The airfield closure and new Brabazon development will provide new routes south into Bristol for public transport linking the old road to Henbury and Southmead.

As of 2026, Bristol Brabazon railway station is under construction on the southern edge of the parish. Patchway railway station is half a mile to the east of Charlton Hayes.
