= Charlton, Bristol =

Former village in South Gloucestershire, England

Coordinates: 51.519°N 2.590°W

Charlton was the name of a small village or large hamlet in present-day South Gloucestershire, England with a Bethel Chapel and Sunday School. It was demolished in the late 1940s. Its site is (in 2020) occupied by part of the derelict runway and safety margins of the former Bristol Filton Airport. The village was located between Filton and what is today the Cribbs Causeway out-of-town commercial and retail area immediately north of Bristol. To the north of the village lay fields and Over Court Deer Park, which is today Bristol Golf Club.

== History ==
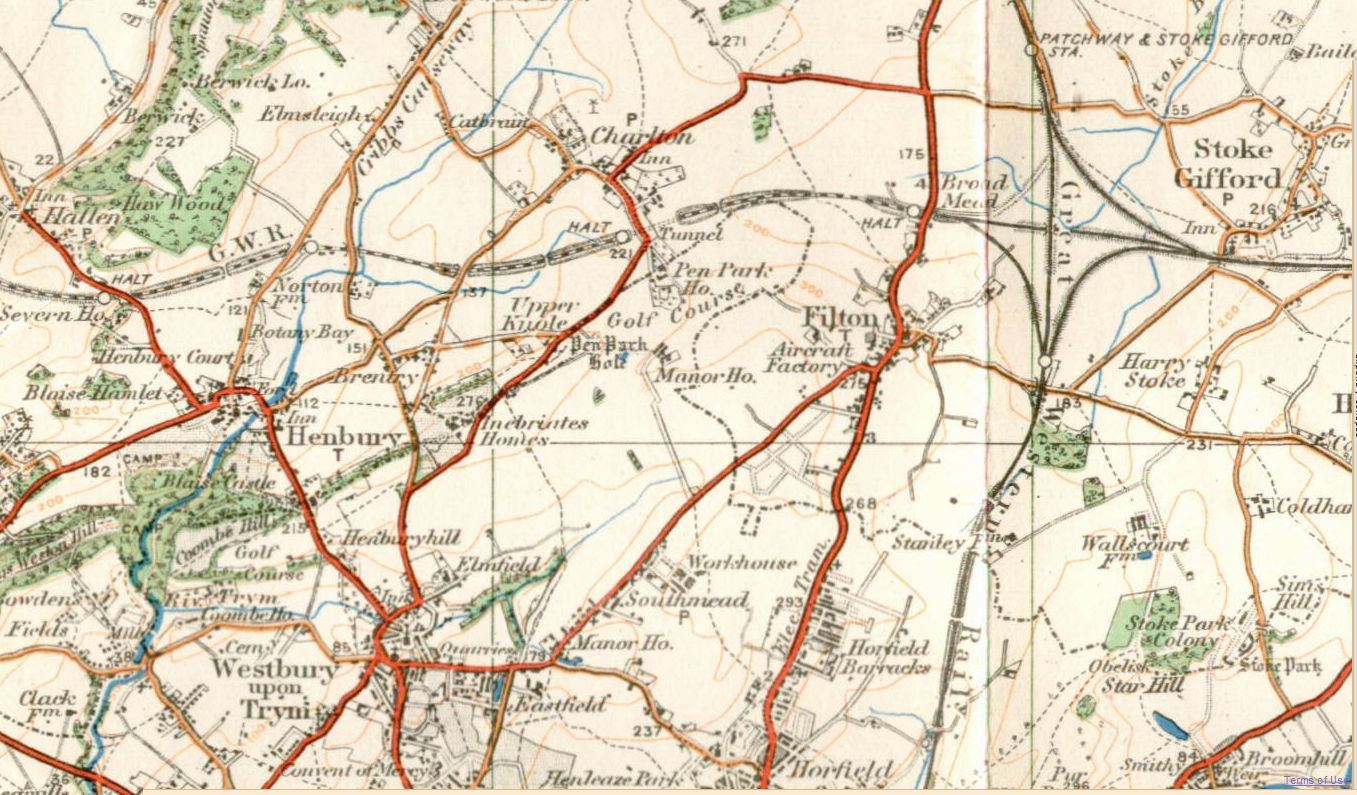
The area round Filton near Bristol in England as about 1935

Charlton was a tything in the ancient parish, and later civil parish, of Henbury which still ecclesiastically covers more than 9,000 acres (14 sq mi). In 1870 Charlton had a population of 425, living in 88 houses. From 1910 to 1915 the place was served by Charlton Halt, on the Henbury Loop railway just south of the village. In 1935 the civil parish of Henbury was abolished, and Charlton was transferred to the civil parish of Almondsbury.

The B4057 road ran through the village. Charlton had farm houses, a public house called the Carpenters Arms, a post office, large houses and a few cottages.

In the late 1940s most of the village was demolished to make way for an extension of the main runway at Filton Airfield to accommodate the take-off and landing requirements of the Bristol Brabazon propeller-driven airliner. Through compulsory purchase, the government offered residents a market price for their homes and offered rehousing in council housing in Patchway, which many took up to retain community links.

== Subsequent use of the site ==
Filton Airfield, later Bristol Filton Airport, operated until the end of 2012. Although the Brabazon project was cancelled in 1953, the extended runway allowed Britannia production at Filton, Vulcan V bombers to be dispersed to Filton during the Cuban Missile Crisis and Concorde supersonic airliners to take off after being assembled at Filton. It also enabled flight testing from the Bristol Siddeley and Rolls-Royce flight-test centres. It allowed major overhaul and conversion programmes to be done at Filton on General Dynamics F-111 Aardvark and Vickers VC10 aircraft.

A mixed use development, to be known as New Charlton, has been proposed between Patchway and Cribbs Causeway, on the site of the runway extension over the village.

== Survival of the name ==
The name survives in Charlton Common – a public recreation area, to the south of the original settlement – Charlton Road, which led from Passage Road, Westbury on Trym, to the village, and Charlton Lane, which led from Henbury and Brentry.

In the 1970s the name was resurrected for the new development of Charlton Mead, on the south side of Filton Airfield near Southmead, and in 2009 it was used again for the new development of Charlton Hayes, on the north side of Filton Airfield at Patchway.

== See also ==
- Heathrow (hamlet), a less populous hamlet demolished similarly
