= Bristol Arena =

Planned indoor arena

Aviva Arena
- Bristol Arena

- Interactive map of Aviva Arena
- Former names: YTL Arena Bristol (2019 – 2026)
- Location: Filton Airfield, Bristol
- Coordinates: 51.5163°N 2.5851°W
- Owner: YTL Corporation
- Operator: YTL Live
- Capacity: 20,000

Construction
- Groundbreaking: January 2026
- Opened: late 2028 (proposed)
- Cost: £100 million
- Architect: Grimshaw Architects with MANICA Architecture
- General contractor: Avison Young

Website
- Aviva Arena

Bristol Arena, known as Aviva Arena for sponsorship reasons and formerly as YTL Arena Bristol, is a 20,000-capacity indoor arena currently under construction, to be located within Filton Airfield's former Brabazon hangar.

Original plans were for the arena to be built next to Bristol Temple Meads railway station in Bristol, England, and was expected to be completed in 2020. The site, which has become known as 'Arena Island', is to the south and across the River Avon from the station, and lies within Bristol Temple Quarter Enterprise Zone. The funding package for the arena scheme was approved by Bristol City Council in February 2014. The winning design, by Populous, was revealed in March 2015.

In January 2017 a new contractor had to be sought following a failure to agree build costs. In September 2018 the plans to build the arena near Temple Meads were abandoned, primarily on cost and risk grounds.

In 2019, YTL Corporation released details regarding their proposal to build the arena at the former Filton Airfield site. Planning permission was given in 2020, and construction was planned to start in 2022 with completion by early 2026. As of 2025, construction work still has yet to commence. In December 2023 the completion date was stated to be late 2025 or early 2026, but has since been pushed backed to 2028 at the earliest.

== Background ==
Initial plans for Bristol Arena were announced in March 2003. The arena, to be built next to Bristol's largest railway station Temple Meads, was planned to have 10,000 seats and host music concerts as well as sports and conferences, and was intended to open by 2008 to coincide with the city's bid to be the European Capital of Culture. In June 2007, work had yet to begin on the arena despite around £13 million spent to purchase and clear the site. In late 2007, the plans were abandoned after developers announced that £40 million of public sector money would be required to fund the arena in addition to the £46m that had already been committed by Bristol City Council and the South West of England Regional Development Agency.

By 2009, plans for Bristol Arena were back on the agenda with two plans put forward. One plan, similar to plans for the site next to Temple Meads, was supported by the architect and future mayor, George Ferguson. The other plan, supported by Bristol City Council, was to build an arena next to Bristol City's proposed stadium at Ashton Vale. A number of legal challenges to Bristol City's proposed stadium caused the council to reconsider plans for an arena on the originally preferred site next to Temple Meads in 2012.

With the opening of the First Direct Arena in Leeds in the summer of 2013, Bristol became the largest city in the United Kingdom without a large arena-style venue. As of late 2013, Bristol's two largest music venues are the Colston Hall and the O_{2} Academy, which both hold around 2,000 people each.

The site, which used to be the location of the Bristol Bath Road depot, was owned by the Homes and Communities Agency (HCA). It is the biggest undeveloped site in Bristol Temple Quarter Enterprise Zone, an urban enterprise zone launched in 2012. In 2013 the HCA agreed to fund an £11 million road bridge over the River Avon, to link the site to Cattle Market Road and the railway station. The HCA transferred ownership of the arena site to Bristol City Council in March 2015. Construction of the 63-metre (207 ft) bridge took place from March to September 2015. It has lanes for cars, bicycles and pedestrians. In March 2016, it was named Brock's Bridge, after William Brock (1830–1907), a local builder and entrepreneur.

Once elected mayor, Ferguson launched a competition to find the best design for a 12,000-seat arena that would be "the most environmentally-friendly venue of its kind" and pledged that the project would be up and running within four years. This was followed by a bid to win £80 million from the government's Regional Growth Fund to partially fund the project and pay for renovations at Colston Hall, which ultimately proved unsuccessful.

== Initial proposal ==
In February 2014, the funding package for the arena scheme was approved as part of Bristol City Council's budget. The total cost of the arena, £91 million, would be funded by the council which would have provided £38 million with the West of England Local Enterprise Partnership funding the remaining £53 million.

Artist impression of the original planned Arena near Temple Meads railway station

In November 2014, the five shortlisted architects for the contract to design the arena were announced. The winning design by Populous, beating designs by Grimshaw Architects LLP, Idom Ingeniería y Consultoría, White Arkitekter and Wilkinson Eyre, was revealed in March 2015. The arena had been designed to achieve a BREEAM 'Excellent' rating and would've been able to quickly convert from a number of different layouts, with capacities ranging from 4,000 to 12,000. The preferred operators, SMG Europe and Live Nation, were announced in December 2014.

In March 2016, the arena plans suffered a further setback when the city's planning committee described the proposals as "defective" and deferred making a decision on them until an appropriate level of supporting information could be provided. Public concern over parking and transport around the proposals had not been properly addressed and the committee were not confident in the detail submitted for approval. George Ferguson claimed the planning committee had put the entire project at risk and the decision was "not about planning, it was about politics."

Following multiple updates to the transport plan, the arena was granted planning permission in April 2016 with the planning committee unanimously in favour of the updated plans.

In January 2017, the projected opening of the arena was delayed to 2020 after Bristol City Council and preferred construction firm Bouygues UK failed to agree on construction costs. Three months later, it was announced that Buckingham Group, who had initially been the second preferred bidder, would carry out preliminary work on the site while negotiating a final price. Bristol City Council have also commissioned an independent review into the project's value for money.

In November 2017, the Bristol Post revealed plans to construct the arena within the Brabazon Hangar at the former Filton Airfield on the edge of the city's boundary, in Southmead ward.

In September 2018, Mayor Marvin Rees scrapped the arena plans in favour of a mixed use development, leaving the Brabazon Hangar as the only option. The primary reasons given for the decision were build cost, future financial risk and job creation. The build cost for the council had increased to £150 million plus half of any cost overruns. Costs arising should the arena not be successful would be to the council, and expert advice was that the venue size was too small for major events. Rees also argued a mixed use development would create more and better paid jobs.

=== Car parking ===
Criticism of the Temple Quarter arena plans had often been aimed at the low number of dedicated car parking spaces on site. Initial plans revealed there would be just 245 spaces on site, 200 of which would be in a temporary facility which would eventually be developed into offices, apartments and retail space. George Ferguson defended the plans, saying "it would be completely mad, completely mad, to put a mass of parking on the site." In February 2016, Bristol City Council denied it had performed a u-turn after it emerged an eight-storey, 480 space car park was to be considered for the site.

== Current plans ==
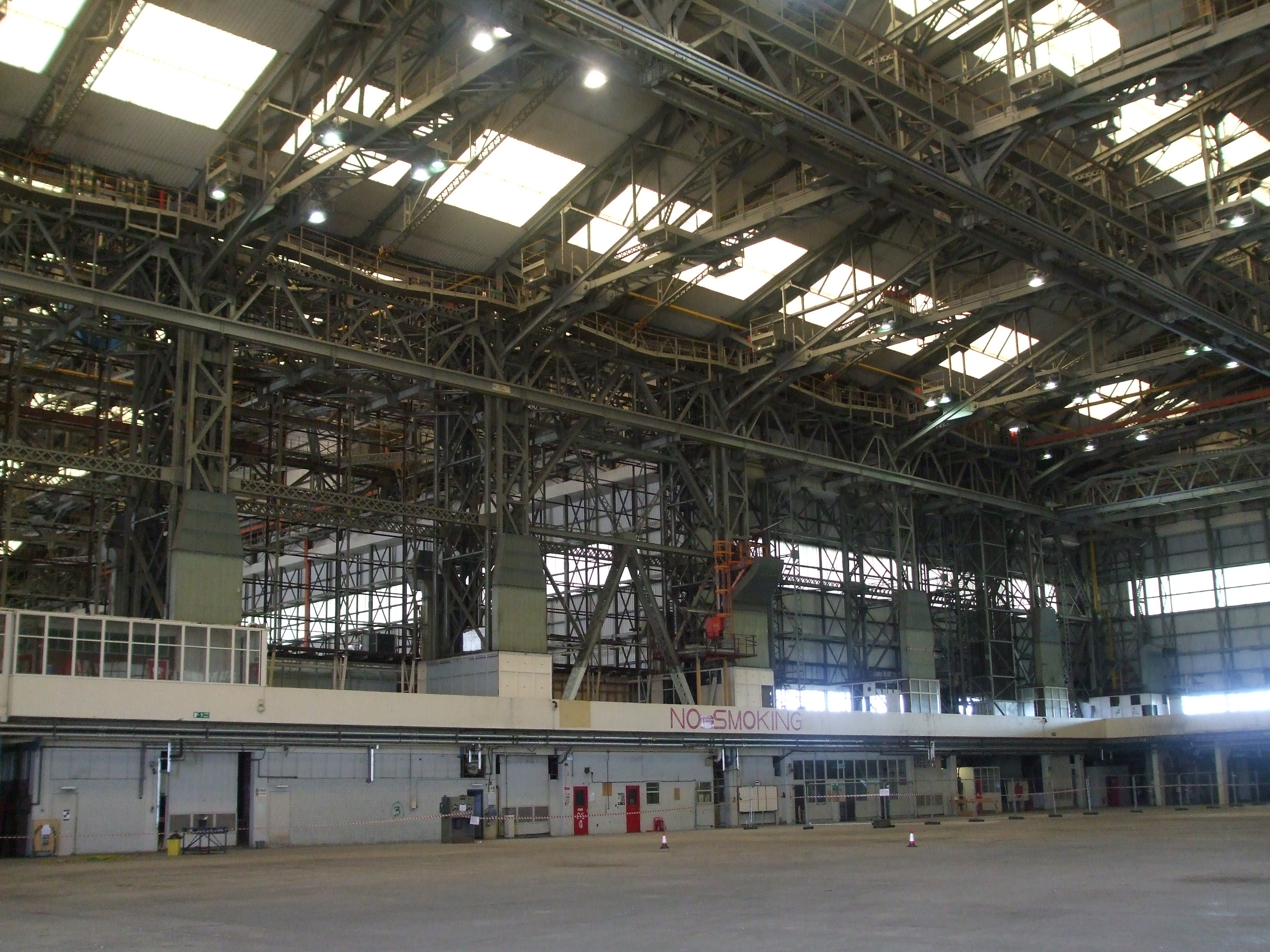
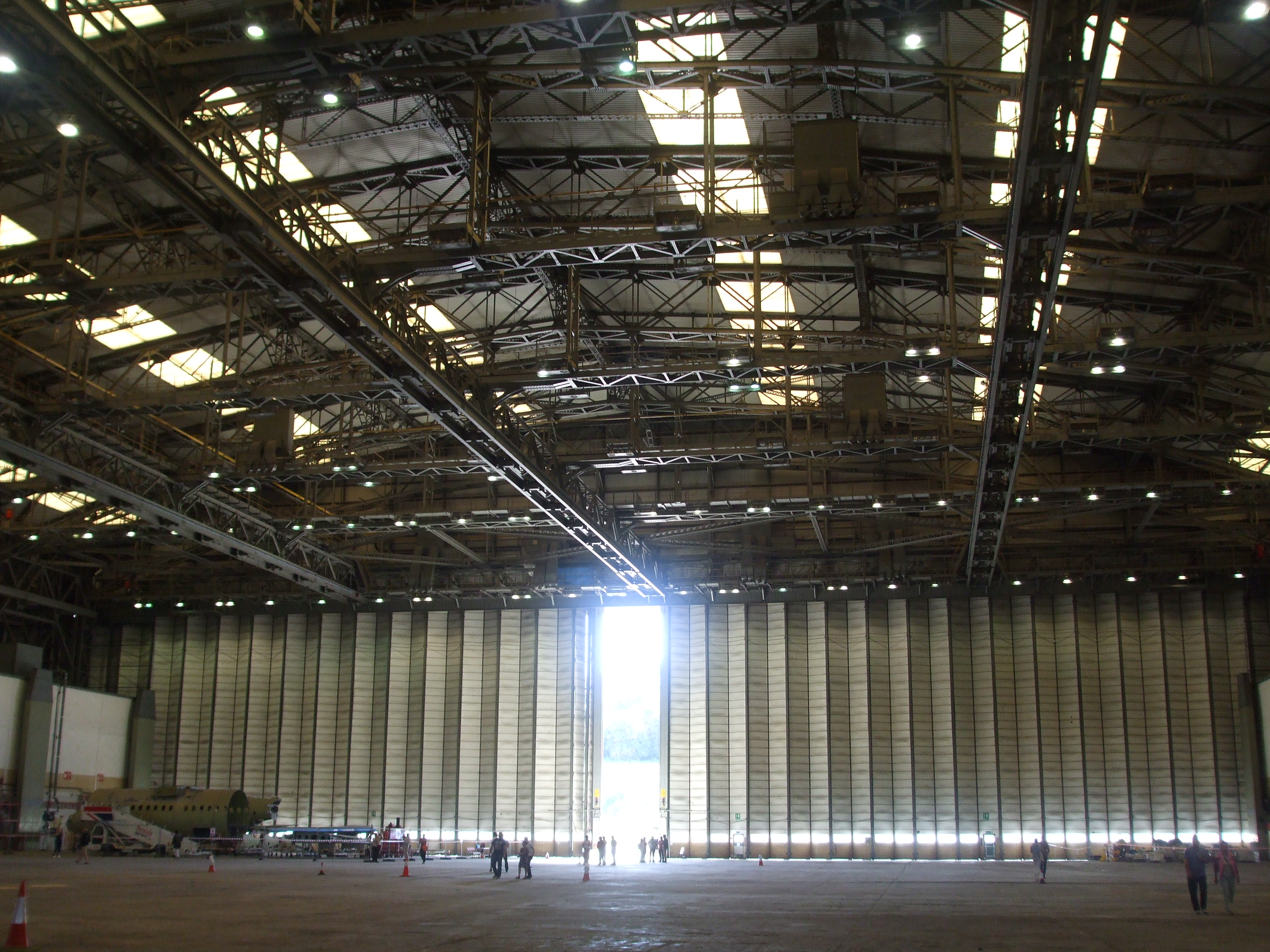
The main hangar where the arena will be built inside (September 2019)

The owner of the former Bristol Filton Airport, YTL Corporation, announced plans in early 2019 for a 17,000 seat indoor arena in the former Brabazon hangar, in partnership with Avison Young, Grimshaw and MANICA Architecture. The "unique seating bowl" design of the arena would allow for flexible capacity ranging from 4,000 to 17,000.

Plans include a walkway modelled after Wembley Way, 36 'Brabazon Steps' and a 75m bridge over the Henbury Loop railway line. The new entrance for the arena in the central hangar will be raised above the existing floor, looking out over the runway. The east and west hangars will be transformed into a Festival Hall and 'The Hub'. Festival Hall will host exhibitions and conventions as well as large scale events. The Hub will consist of small or start-up businesses, food and drink outlets, and leisure facilities.

Planning permission was given in 2020, and construction was planned to start in 2022 with completion by 2024.

The former airfield site has been earmarked by South Gloucestershire Council for 2,675 new homes, however the Brabazon Hangar is just to the south of the airfield in Bristol. This new suburb, to be called Brabazon, began construction in 2020 with the first residents arriving in 2021.

In January 2023, it was announced that the opening of the Arena would be delayed until late 2025 or early 2026, however the capacity of the arena would be increased to 19,000 due to design improvements. The arena will be carbon-neutral and open throughout the year.

On 1 February 2023, the West of England Combined Authority (WECA) announced that the planned rail package was under review due to soaring costs; it was announced that costs had risen to more than £10 million from the £6.6 million already approved. This follows delays to the planned rail package due to design changes which was being led by WECA. Despite this Labour Metro Mayor Dan Norris appeared to accuse Conservative led South Gloucestershire Council (SGC) for making mistakes with the figures, which SGC disputed claiming high inflation and utilities prices were to blame for increasing costs.

In January 2024, YTL obtained planning permission to build 1,500 student flats and 400 private homes near to the planned Arena and public transport links. In May 2024, plans were submitted to Bristol City Council for an outdoor cinema, which would be replaced in the winter by an ice rink, in addition to courts, for badminton and tennis, a multi-use games area for sports such as basketball and five-a-side football, and a pump track for cycling.

In an update regarding the progress of the arena project in September 2024, the developers confirmed they had yet to start construction work and were still in the 'enabling works' phase which included decontamination and demolition of non-essential structures. The opening date was pushed backed to 2027 at the earliest; although, in January 2025 it was reported to be more likely in 2028. Updated plans and amendments to the final design of the arena's facade and roof were submitted by YTL and validated by the council in December 2024. In July 2025, it was reported that plans were being finalised to increase the arena's overall capacity to 20,000. By October 2025, large parts of the hangar had been stripped back to its original steel frame and outer buildings on the site demolished to clear space for the installation of an accessible footbridge to link it to the Brabazon development. In January 2026, work to convert the historic 1940s hangar into an arena began. This will include installing a more acoustically sound roof and a number of stands within the next eighteen months. On 19 February 2026, it was announced that the venue would be named Aviva Arena as part of a long-term multi-million pound sponsorship deal with the insurance firm.

== See also ==
- Bristol Beacon, currently Bristol's largest concert venue
- O2 Academy Bristol, Bristol's second largest concert venue
- Utilita Arena Cardiff, the nearest comparable arena
- List of indoor arenas in the United Kingdom
