= Filton Town Council =

Council In Filton, UK

Filton Town Council is a council made up of thirteen councillors and manages the council precept on behalf of Filton taxpayers

== Councillors ==
As at May 2018 the composition of the council is 9 Labour, 2 Conservative, and 2 UKIP councillors. The last election was held on 7 May 2015.

== Administration ==
The council is administered by three council staff. Lesley Reuben is the town clerk.

== Controversy ==
The council was forced to abandon plans to level Elm Park playing fields in Filton following criticism in the Bristol Evening Post.
