= List of indoor arenas in the United Kingdom =

This is a list of indoor arenas in the United Kingdom with an indoor seating capacity of at least 5,000, regardless of usage.

== Constructed ==
=== England ===
City/town	Arena	Date built	Capacity	Image
Birmingham	bp pulse LIVE	1980	15,685	
Birmingham	Arena Birmingham	1991	15,800	
Bolton	Bolton Arena	2001	6,500	
Bournemouth	Bournemouth International Centre	1984	6,500	
Brighton	Brighton Centre	1977	5,000	
Coventry	Coventry Building Society Arena	2005	10,000	
Derby	Derby Arena	2015	5,000	
Derby	Vaillant Live	2025	3,500	
Exeter	Westpoint Exeter	1990	7,500	
Leeds	Leeds Arena	2013	13,781	
Liverpool	Liverpool Arena	2008	11,000	
London	Copper Box Arena	2011	7,500	
London	The O2 Arena	2007	20,000	
London	Wembley Arena	1934	12,500	
Manchester	Manchester Arena	1995	23,000	
Manchester	Co-op Live	2024	23,500	
Milton Keynes	Arena MK	2014	5,000	
Newcastle upon Tyne	Newcastle Arena	1995	11,400	
Nottingham	Nottingham Arena	2000	10,000	
Sheffield	Sheffield Arena	1991	13,600	

=== Northern Ireland ===
City/town	Arena	Date built	Capacity	Image
Belfast	The O2 Belfast	1999	10,800	

=== Scotland ===
City/town	Arena	Date built	Capacity	Image
Aberdeen	P&J Live	2019	10,000 – 15,000	
Glasgow	Braehead Arena	1999	5,200 – 8,000	
Glasgow	Commonwealth Arena and Sir Chris Hoy Velodrome	2012	8,200	
Glasgow	OVO Hydro	2013	14,300	

=== Wales ===
City/town	Arena	Date built	Capacity	Image
Cardiff	Cardiff International Arena	1993	7,500	
Newport	International Convention Centre Wales	2019	5,000	
Swansea	Swansea Arena	2022	3,500	

== Proposed ==
City/town	Arena	Opening	Capacity
Bristol	YTL Arena Bristol	2028	20,000
Bristol	Bristol Sports & Convention Centre	TBA	5,000
Cardiff	New Cardiff Bay Arena	2028	15,348
East Kilbride	Playsport Arena	2026	6,000
Edinburgh	Edinburgh Arena	2027	8,500
Gateshead	The Sage	TBD	12,500
London	New London Lions Arena	TBD	15,000
Sunderland	Sunderland Arena	TBD	10,000

=== Former proposals ===
City/town	Arena	Capacity	Outcome
Dundee	Dundee Arena	10,000	Did not materialise, site repurposed to LiveHouse Dundee
London	MSG Sphere London	21,500	Rejected

== Former / demolished ==
City/town	Arena	Date built	Date closed	Capacity	Image
Aberdeen	BHGE Arena	1985	2019	8,500	
London	Harringay Arena	1936	1958	13,500	
London	London Arena	1989	2005	15,000	
London	Basketball Arena	2011	2012	12,000	
London	Water Polo Arena	2011	2012	5,000	
London	Earls Court Exhibition Centre	1937	2014	20,000	

== See also ==
- List of indoor arenas in Europe
- List of indoor arenas by capacity
- List of British stadiums by capacity
- List of venues in the United Kingdom
- Lists of stadiums
