= Bristol Brabazon railway station =

Railway station under construction in England

Bristol Brabazon
- North-side platform as seen from the Propellor Quarter entrance, two weeks before opening

General information
- Location: Filton, South Gloucestershire; England
- Coordinates: 51.5175°N 2.5792°W
- Grid reference: ST599800
- Platforms: 2

Construction
- Accessible: Yes

Other information
- Status: Under construction
- Station code: BBZ

Key dates
- 14 March 2025: Construction begins
- 23 November 2026: Proposed opening
Location

Bristol Brabazon railway station is a new railway station, currently under construction. It will serve the new development Brabazon and the town Filton in South Gloucestershire, England. The station is expected to open on 23 November 2026. It will also serve the Aviva Arena which is under construction and due to open in 2028.

== History ==
A station previously existed about 450 m (490 yd) to the east of the current location called North Filton Platform railway station. This station opened and closed at various times between 1910 and 1964, with an unadvertised service for workers until full closure in 1986.

In 2021, a planning application was submitted for a new station. This was granted in January 2023 with a projected opening date of autumn 2026. Construction began on 14 March 2025.

It was initially known as North Filton, but the new name for the station was announced in March 2026 as Bristol Brabazon.

Neighbouring Henbury, which has also since gained planning permission, is not scheduled to open until 2028.

The station was officially opened by Heidi Alexander on 19 November 2026, four days before train services start. The first train is planned to be the 07:10 to Bristol Temple Meads on 23 November 2026. The initial hourly service to Bristol will be linked with Portishead services when that line opens in 2028–2029.

== Facilities ==
The station is close to Gloucester Road North and will be located to the east of the Brabazon Hangars. There will be two platforms, connected by a footbridge and lifts, ensuring step-free access for all users. Both platforms will have ticket machines and covered waiting areas and the station will include spaces for blue badge holders as well as cycle parking. It will be accessible from the north, via a station square, with drop-off spaces as well as stops for rail-replacement buses.

The station will be initially unstaffed but when the Aviva Arena opens in 2028, a new ticket office will be built.

== Services ==
The station will have an hourly service between Bristol Temple Meads and Henbury.

Preceding station	National Rail	Following station
	Future services	
Henbury; Line open, station under construction	Great Western Railway; Henbury Loop Line	Filton Abbey Wood; Line open, station open on different line towards Bristol Temple Meads
