= Great Western Air Ambulance Charity =

English charity air ambulance

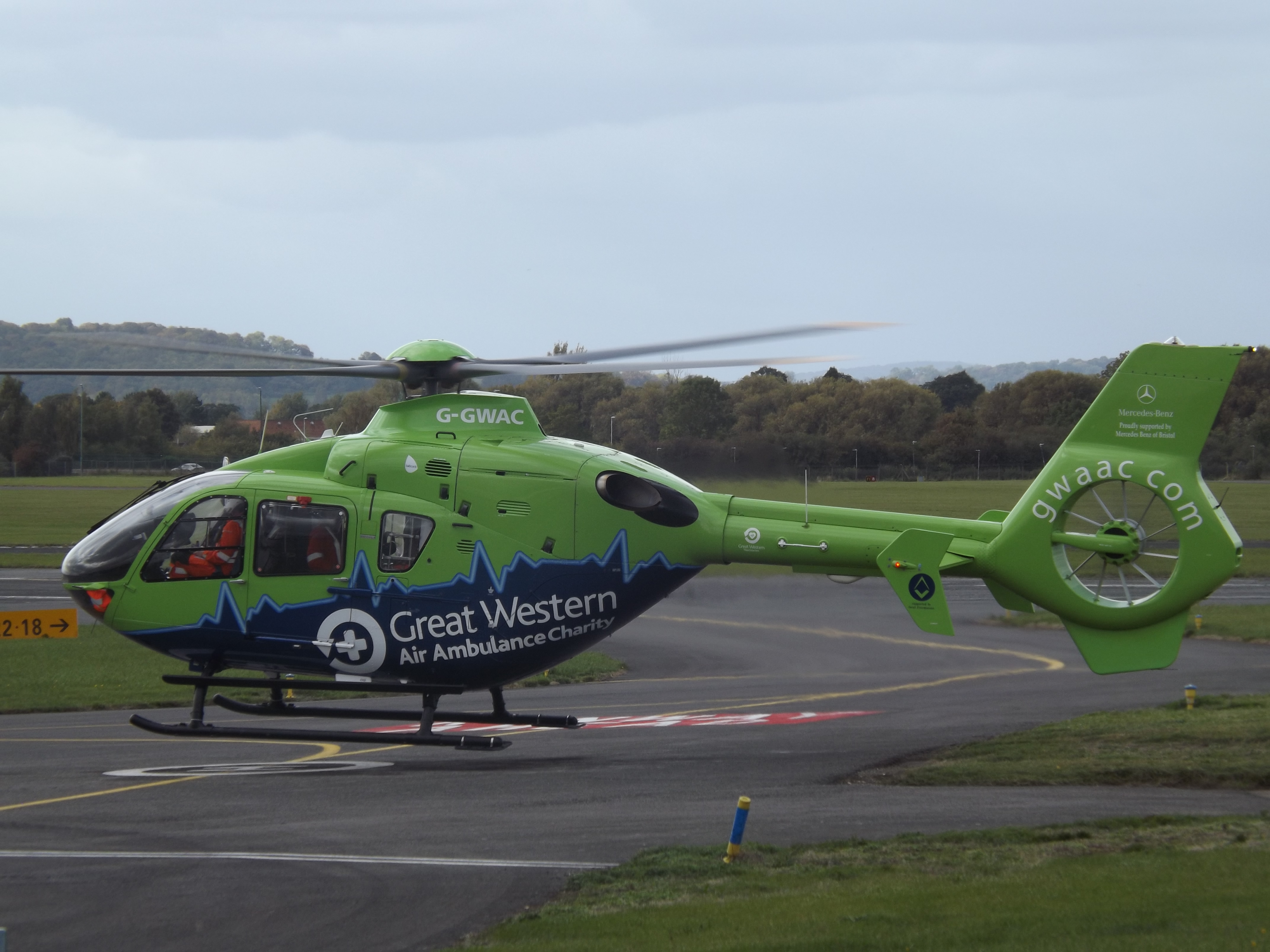
- Eurocopter EC135 helicopter G-GWAC of Great Western Air Ambulance
- Type: Charitable organisation
- Registration no.: Charity No: 1121300
- Location: Almondsbury, South Gloucestershire
- Coordinates: 51.5517°N 2.5576°W
- Region served: Bristol; North Somerset; Bath and North East Somerset; South Gloucestershire; Gloucestershire
- Aircraft operated: Eurocopter EC135
- Revenue: £6.7 million (2024)
- Employees: 53 (2024)
- Volunteers: 396 (2024)
- Website: greatwesternairambulance.com

The Great Western Air Ambulance Charity (GWAAC) is a charity air ambulance service in South West England. It operates for the relief of sickness and injury, with a specialist paramedic in critical care and a critical care doctor, providing response by helicopter or car between the hours of 7:00 am and 1:00 am, 365 days a year. The service covers Bristol, North Somerset, Bath and North East Somerset, South Gloucestershire, Gloucestershire, and surrounding areas.

== History ==
GWAAC was created in 2007. At launch, it operated a Eurocopter EC135, but as flying hours increased the funding was not available, so the charity moved to a MBB Bo 105 helicopter. In 2012, the charity started a campaign to raise the money needed to return to the EC135. The goal was reached in 2014, and in October the EC135 (registered G-GWAA) arrived at the base in Bristol Filton Airport. The EC135 had a 40% increase in cabin volume, allowing the team to offer better inflight treatment. It had an extra seat, allowing medics to be trained on-board or a child patient to be airlifted with a parent. It can also land on elevated hospital helipads, and allows side loading. On 1 August 2017, GWAAC upgraded to an EC135 T2+ model, registration G-GWAC, leased from Babcock Mission Critical Services Onshore, which has more advanced features and a longer range.

In 2012, it was announced that Filton airfield, where GWAAC and the National Police Air Service (NPAS) had been based, was to close. Their landlord, BAE Systems, agreed to find a new site and construct an airbase for the services. A site was identified in South Gloucestershire, adjacent to the Almondsbury M4/M5 Interchange, approximately 2 miles (3.2 km) north of the Filton base. Planning permission was granted in August 2016. Work started at the site in late 2017, with both services moving to the new base in October 2018.

In July 2018, GWAAC launched a public appeal to raise funds to buy the new airbase from BAE Systems, following it being put up for sale during its construction. GWAAC raised £1.3 million towards the purchase, which completed in December 2018. NPAS remain on site as tenants of GWAAC. In September 2019, the new airbase was officially opened by Prince Richard, Duke of Gloucester.

== Operations ==
The charity serves a population of 2.1 million. It has received grants in the past from the national government, but does not receive operational funding from the government or National Lottery, and is normally funded by public donations.

In 2023–2024, the charity raised income of £6.7 million, including £93,000 from government grants. It spent £6.5M, of which £3.8M (59%) was spent operating its helicopter and critical care cars.

Within four minutes of an emergency call being received the helicopter can be in the air, and it can be anywhere within the region it covers in 20 minutes.

GWAAC also operates critical care cars, used at night or when the helicopter is not feasible – for example due to the location of the patient, or the helicopter being at another job, or otherwise unavailable.

The specialist critical care team consists of a paramedic and doctor, who provide a remote emergency department to the patient. The crew carry blood and fresh frozen plasma to help treat patients who have suffered major trauma to stabilise them for transport, usually to a major trauma centre, for adults or children. This has been found to result in significantly improved patient outcomes. Local blood bike charity Freewheelers EVS assists NHS Blood and Transplant with the logistics of keeping the helicopter supplied with blood and plasma.

In 2024, GWAAC were called to 2,272 incidents, their busiest year since the service started in 2007.

During the COVID-19 pandemic the service responded to COVID-19 cases, and crew members joined a team carrying out inter-hospital transfers for COVID-19 patients requiring intensive care.

== See also ==
- Air ambulances in the United Kingdom
