= Almondsbury =

Village in South West, England

Coordinates: 51.5567°N 2.5725°W

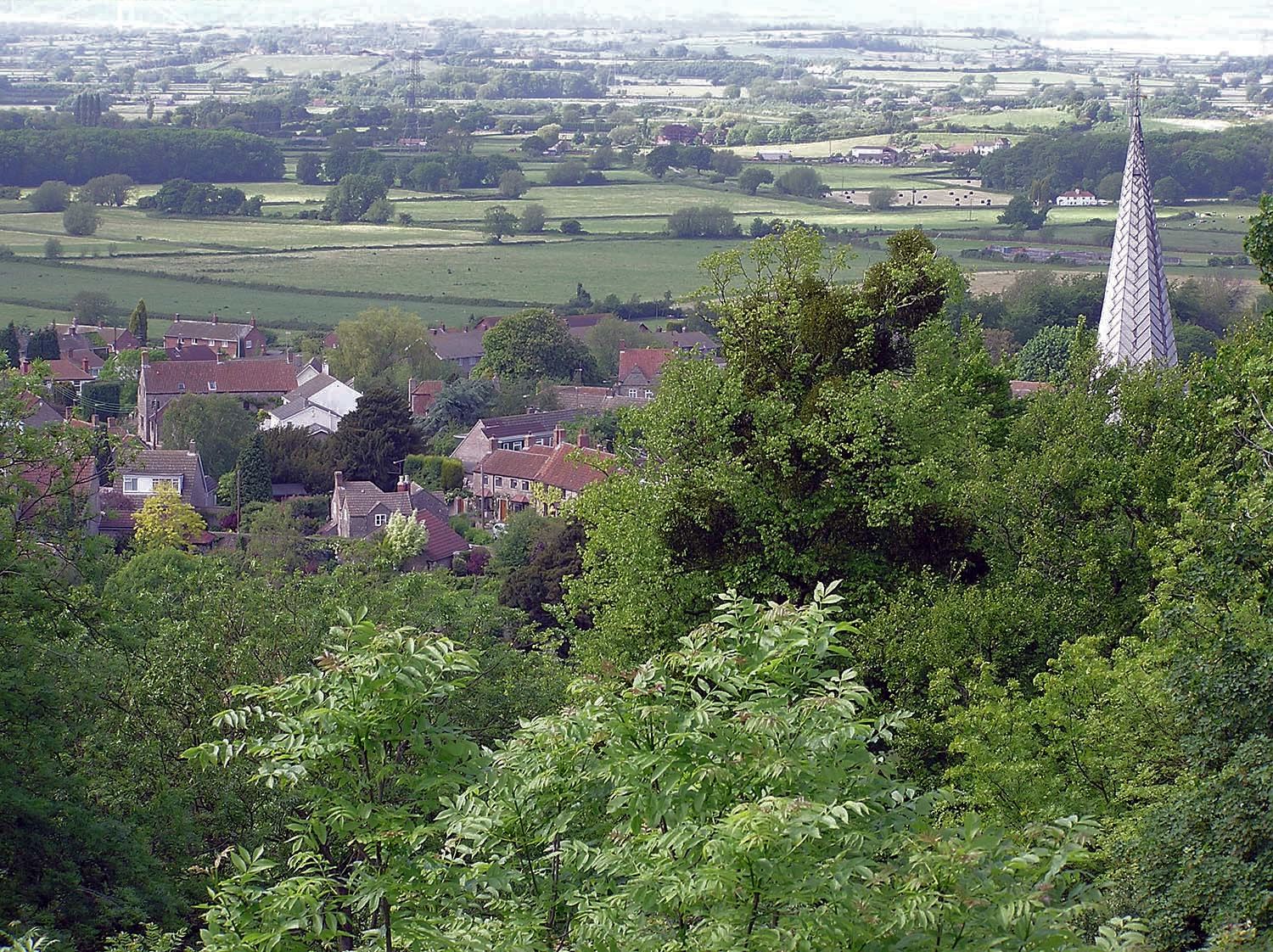
- Part of Almondsbury from The Tump. The spire is Saint Mary the Virgin church.

- Location within Gloucestershire
- Population: 4,705 (2011 census)
- OS grid reference: ST604843
- Civil parish: Almondsbury
- Unitary authority: South Gloucestershire
- Ceremonial county: Gloucestershire
- Region: South West
- Country: England
- Sovereign state: United Kingdom
- Post town: BRISTOL
- Postcode district: BS32
- Dialling code: 01454
- Police: Avon and Somerset
- Fire: Avon
- Ambulance: South Western
- UK Parliament: Thornbury and Yate

Almondsbury (English: /ˈɑːməndzbərɪ/) is a large village and civil parish in South Gloucestershire, England. It is situated on the A38 road in the Avon Green Belt 7 miles (11 km) north of Bristol city centre. It is adjacent to junction 16 of the M5 motorway and Almondsbury Interchange, where the M4 and M5 cross. It is part of the Bristol Built-up Area.

The civil parish also includes the villages of Hortham, Gaunt's Earthcott, Over, Easter Compton, Compton Greenfield, Hallen and Berwick.

The village is split by a steep hill, part of the escarpment overlooking the Severn floodplain. At the bottom of the hill is Lower Almondsbury where a pub and hotel, The Bowl Inn, is situated. South Wales, the Forest of Dean, the River Severn and both Severn Bridges are visible from the higher parts of the village, which consists mainly of ribbon development along the A38 and has more of an urban characteristic.

== Governance ==
Almondsbury is in the South Gloucestershire unitary authority area. Almondsbury is part of the Severn Vale electoral ward, which elects two of the 61 members of South Gloucestershire Council.

Historically, Almondsbury was in Thornbury Rural District from 1895 to 1974, and then the Northavon district of the county of Avon from 1974 to 1996, when South Gloucestershire was created.

For elections to the UK Parliament, Almondsbury is in the Thornbury and Yate constituency, which as of 2024 is represented by Claire Young of the Liberal Democrats. Historically, it was in the Thornbury constituency from 1885, moving to Stroud and Thornbury at the 1950 election, South Gloucestershire in 1955, Northavon in 1983, and Filton and Bradley Stoke in 2010.

== History ==
The place-name 'Almondsbury' is first attested in the Domesday Book of 1086, where it appears as Almodesberie. The name means 'Æthelmod's or Ealhmund's burgh or fortified place'.

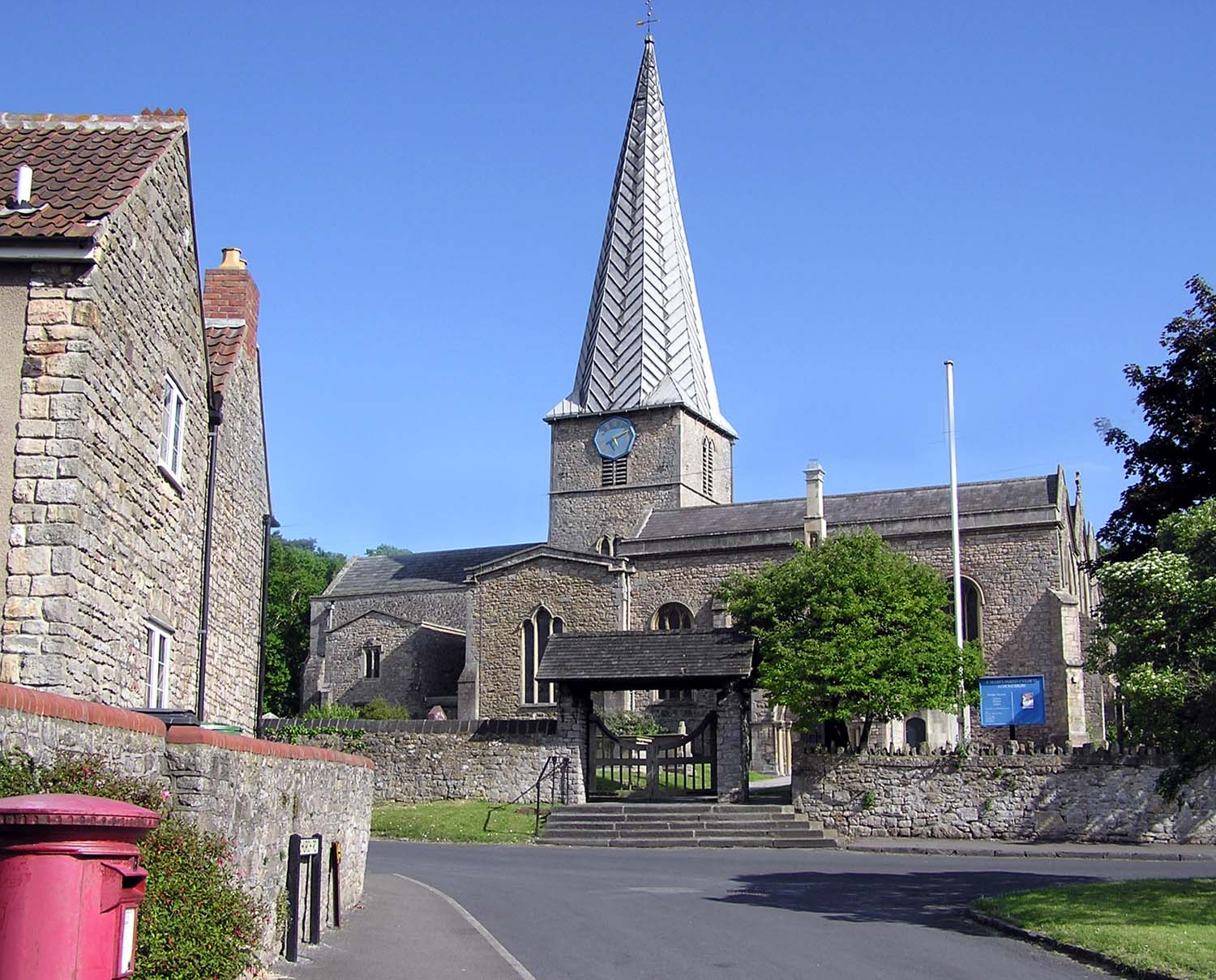
St Mary's Parish church

The local church, dedicated to Saint Mary the Virgin, was built in 1140 AD. The lead-covered spire was added to the original tower some time before 1619.

In 1817, a woman purporting to be Princess Caraboo was found in the town, in what was to become one of the more elaborate deceptions of the period.

== Amenities ==
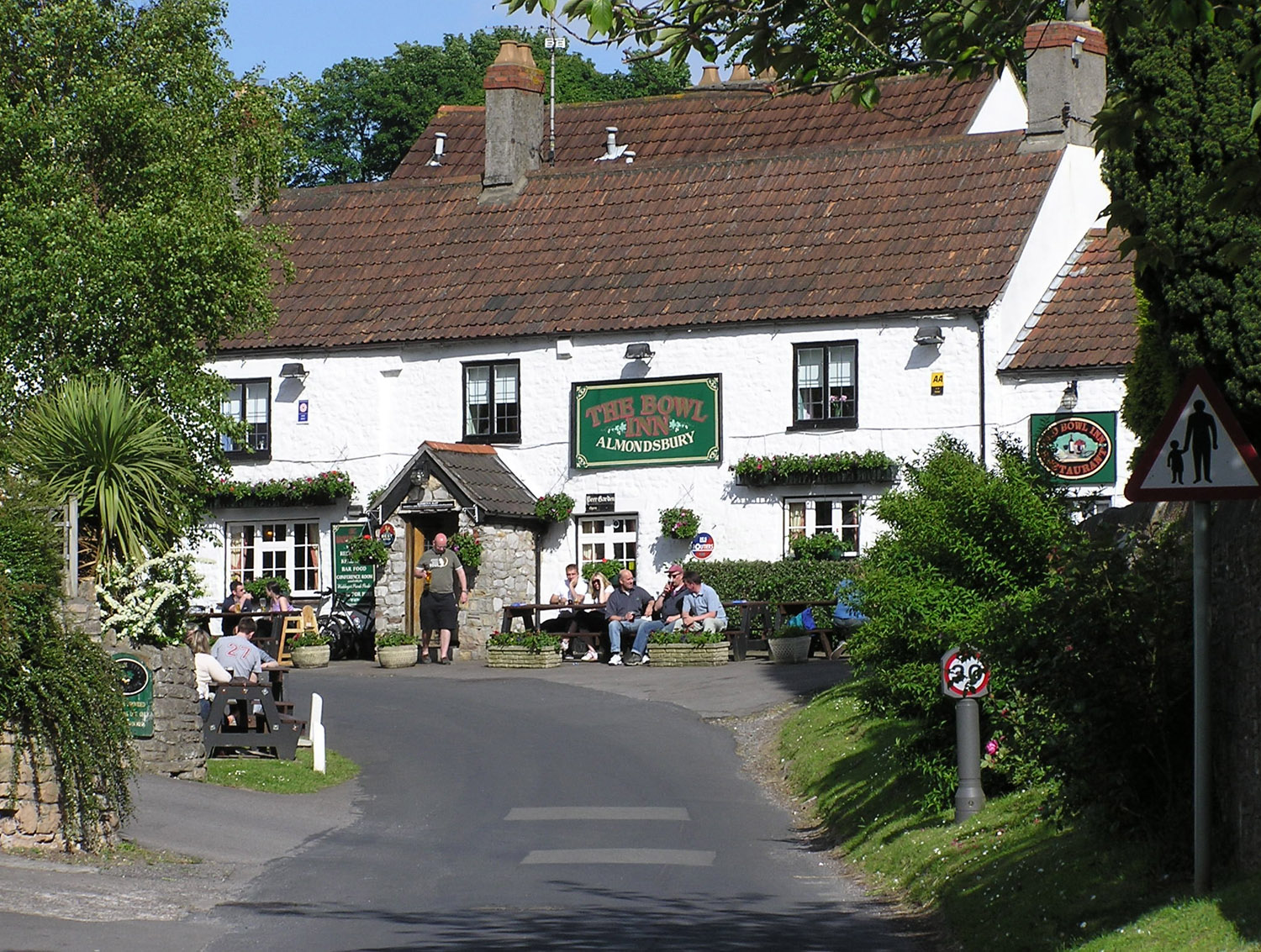
The Bowl Inn

The Bowl Inn pub takes its name from the bowl shape of the land surrounding the estuary. Parts of this whitewashed-stone inn were originally the three cottages erected in 1146 to house the monks building the adjacent church of St Mary the Virgin. The present building became a licensed inn in 1550.

Another pub, The Swan Inn, is located on the A38 in the upper part of the village, almost opposite an open space known as Almondsbury Tump.

In March 2009 a community shop was opened in the village by the not-for-profit Almondsbury Community Services Association, situated opposite the Old School Hall at 14 Church Road. The community shop is staffed entirely by unpaid volunteers. The aim of the project goes beyond a village shop, being a service for the village, to support local suppliers wherever possible, and to be another focal point where people in the village can meet. A proportion of the surplus generated by the shop is returned to community projects and organisations in the village. In 2018, the village community purchased the premises from the church through a Community Share issue. The chairman of the shop committee is John Mclevy.

The village also has an ambulance station, a motorway police station, a garden centre, and a restaurant/pub. A helicopter base is present next to the Almondsbury Interchange as a new home for National Police Air Service Filton and the Great Western Air Ambulance.

=== Education ===
Education is provided by Almondsbury Church of England Primary School. This is a state maintained school. The most recent Ofsted report has been rated outstanding. For secondary education, Almondsbury is served by The Castle School and Marlwood School.

== Sport and leisure ==
Almondsbury is home to non-League football club Almondsbury F.C. who play at Almondsbury Sports & Social Complex on Gloucester Road. Almondsbury Cricket Club and Almondsbury Tennis club are also based at the same site. Gloucestershire FA are also based in Almondsbury at Oakland Park. North Bristol RFC play next door.

Almondsbury is home to St Nick's Gaelic Athletic Association club.

== Notable residents ==
- Sir Miles Partridge (1488-1551), Courtier to King Henry VIII, Head of Court entertainment which included gambling evenings, infamous for winning a bet with Henry VIII, a gift of St. Paul’s Jesus Bells. He removed and broke them as a defiant gesture and publicity stunt for the reformation. (Cite: Sir Miles Partridge of Bristol and Almondsbury, a Royal Servant, by N.A. Deas 2000, MS, Bristol Libraries).
- Cattelena (died 1625), an African woman, kept a small dairy business in Almondsbury during the early 17th century.
- Reginald Crompton (1870–1945), stage and silent film actor.
- Alex Kapranos (born 1972), birthplace of the lead singer of Franz Ferdinand.

== Civil parish ==
The civil parish of Almondsbury is much larger than the village. It includes the villages of Hortham, Gaunt's Earthcott, Over, Easter Compton, Compton Greenfield, Catbrain and Hallen. It also includes Cribbs Causeway and the site of the village of Charlton, now the western end of Filton Airfield.

When it was originally created in 1866 the civil parish also included Patchway, but not Easter Compton, Compton Greenfield, Hallen, Cribbs Causeway or Charlton, all of which were transferred from the parish of Henbury in 1935. The parish of Patchway was separated from Almondsbury in 1953.
