= Bristol Brabazon =

British propeller-driven large airliner prototype

Brabazon
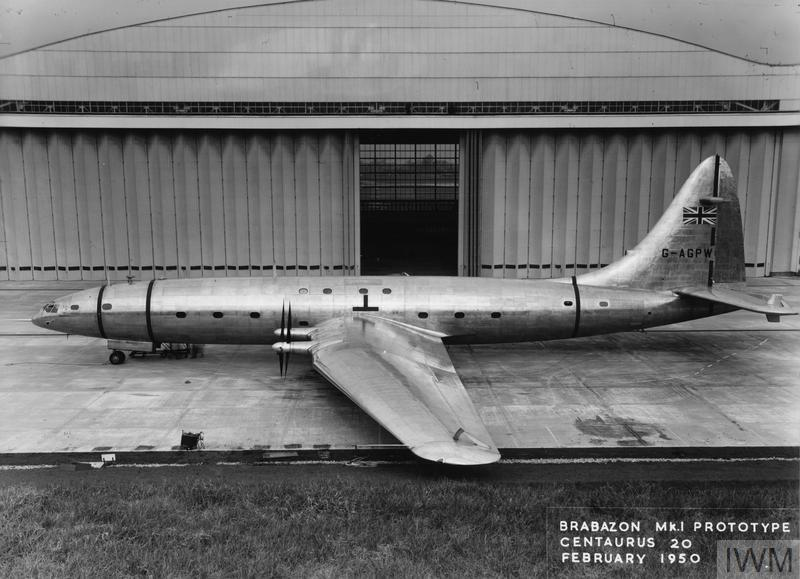
- Brabazon in 1950

General information
- Type: Airliner
- National origin: United Kingdom
- Manufacturer: Bristol Aeroplane Company
- Status: Scrapped
- Number built: 1

History
- First flight: 4 September 1949
- Retired: 1953

The Bristol Type 167 Brabazon was a large British piston-engined propeller-driven airliner designed by the Bristol Aeroplane Company to fly transatlantic routes between the UK and the United States. The type was named Brabazon after the Brabazon Committee and its chairman, Lord Brabazon of Tara, which had developed the specification to which the airliner was designed.

While Bristol had studied the prospects of developing very large aircraft as bombers prior to and during the Second World War, it was the release of a report compiled by the Brabazon Committee which led the company to adapt its proposed bomber into a large civil airliner to meet the Type I specification for the long-distance transatlantic route. Initially designated the Type 167, the proposed aircraft had a 25-foot (7.6 m)-diameter fuselage, containing full upper and lower decks on which passengers would be seated in luxurious conditions. It was powered by an arrangement of eight Bristol Centaurus radial engines which drove eight paired contra-rotating propellers set on four forward-facing nacelles.

Bristol decided to submit the Type 167 proposal to meet Air Ministry Specification 2/44. Following a brief evaluation period, a contract to build a pair of prototypes was awarded. At the time of its construction, the Brabazon was one of the largest aeroplanes ever built, being sized roughly between the much later Airbus A300 and Boeing 767 airliners. Despite its vast size, the Brabazon was designed to carry only 100 passengers, each one allowed an area about the size of the interior of a small car. On 4 September 1949 the first prototype made its maiden flight. In addition to participating in a flight test programme in support of the intended production aircraft, the prototype made high-profile public appearances at the 1950 Farnborough Airshow, Heathrow Airport, and the 1951 Paris Air Show.

However, due to the high cost per seat mile compared to the alternatives, the Brabazon did not attract any firm orders, so the aircraft was a commercial failure. On 17 July 1953 Duncan Sandys, the Minister of Supply, announced that the Brabazon had been cancelled due to a lack of military or civil orders. In the end, only the single prototype was flown, and it was broken up in 1953 for scrap, along with the incomplete, turboprop-powered Brabazon I Mk.II.

== Design and development ==
=== Background ===
During the Second World War, the British government made the decision to dedicate its aircraft industry to the production of combat aircraft and to source the majority of its transport aircraft from manufacturers in the United States. (Note: Some sources consider the British decision to have been the product of a formal diplomatic agreement between the British Government and the Government of the United States under which the former would focus on manufacturing bomber aircraft while the latter would dedicate its efforts to developing more capable transport aircraft. Author Stephan Wilkinson asserts that "No such agreement existed", and said that many of the American airliners had their origins in efforts that had predated the war.) Having foreseen that the effective abandonment of any development in terms of civil aviation would put Britain's aviation industry at a substantial disadvantage once the conflict had come to an end, during 1943 a British government committee began meeting under the leadership of Lord Brabazon of Tara with the aim of investigating and forecasting the post-war civil aviation requirements of Britain and the Commonwealth of Nations.

The committee, which had become known simply as the Brabazon Committee, delivered its report, which was likewise known as the Brabazon Report. The report called for the construction of a total of four of five designs they had studied. Of those designs, the Type I was a very large transatlantic airliner, the Type II was a short-haul airliner, the Type III was a medium-range airliner for the multiple-hop "Empire" air routes, and the Type IV was an innovative jet-powered 500 mph (800 km/h) airliner. In particular, the Type I and Type IV were regarded as being of very high importance to the industry, particularly the jet-powered Type IV, which would give Britain a commanding lead in the field of jet transport. An outline of the specifications for the various envisioned aircraft, including the gigantic Type I, was issued by the Committee.

As early as 1937, the Bristol Aeroplane Company had conducted studies into very large bomber designs, one of which received the internal company designation of Type 159, and another, undesignated design that broadly resembled the eventual configuration of the Brabazon. Additionally, Bristol's design team had already been considering the requirements of an aircraft capable of conducting routine transatlantic flights, which had led to projections of the necessary size, weight and range of such an airliner. Amongst those, it was determined that, in order to be profitable, a minimum payload of 100 passengers should be carried by the type.

In 1942, the Air Ministry issued a draft operational requirement from the Air Staff, which sought a heavy bomber design that would be capable of carrying a payload of at least 15 tons of bombs. In response, Bristol dusted off their original work and updated it to incorporate their newer and substantially more powerful Bristol Centaurus engines. The Bristol design team, led by L. G. Frise and Archibald Russell, worked with several key performance parameters. Those included a range of 5,000 mi (8,000 km), 225 ft (69 m) wingspan, eight engines buried in the wings driving four pusher propeller installations, and enough fuel for transatlantic range. The Convair B-36 was in many ways the American equivalent of that projected "100-ton bomber". In addition to Bristol, many leading British manufacturers had provided several preliminary studies in response to the Air Ministry's operational requirement. However, in expectation of long development times, and the difficulties associated with balancing the aircraft's range, load and defensive armament, the Ministry never took up any of the British manufacturer's designs. Instead, it was decided to continue development of the existing Avro Lancaster, which led to the production of the improved Avro Lincoln.

In 1942, the Brabazon Report was published and Bristol chose to respond, submitting a slightly modified version of their bomber to fulfil the Type I requirement. Bristol's earlier work had demonstrated the sort of performance that the Brabazon Committee had been looking for, and so the Committee authorised the firm to begin preliminary design of such an aircraft that year, with the proviso that work on wartime aircraft should not be disrupted by the project. Bristol was soon issued with a contract to produce a pair of prototype aircraft.

=== Bristol 167 ===
In November 1944, after further work on the design, a final concept for the Type 167 was published. The final design featured a large 177 ft (54 m) fuselage, paired with a sizable wing. The wing, which had a 230 ft (70.1 m) wingspan, (Note: The wingspan of the Brabazon was 35 ft/11 m greater than the Boeing 747, a widebody jetliner that was developed two decades later.) possessed an enormous internal volume, to house sufficient fuel for the transatlantic flights envisioned for the type. It was powered by eight Bristol Centaurus 18-cylinder radial engines, which were the most powerful British-built piston engines available at the time, each being capable of generating 2,650 horsepower (1,980 kW). These were set in pairs in the wing, and instead of using a common crankshaft, the paired engines each had their driveshafts angled towards an enormous central gearbox. They drove a series of eight paired contra-rotating propellers, which were set on four forward-facing nacelles.

The Brabazon Report had assumed that the wealthy people flying in the aircraft would consider a long trip by air to be uncomfortable, and so designed the Type I for luxury, demanding 200 ft^{3} (6 m^{3}) of space for every passenger, which was expanded to 270 ft^{3} (8 m^{3}) for luxury class. If outfitted with conventionally spaced seating, the dimensions of the Type 167 could have accommodated up to 300 passengers, instead of the 60 seats opted for. Other high-comfort measures were proposed, such as an onboard cinema, a cocktail bar, and lounge area. According to author Stephan Wilkinson, the decision to focus on comfort over other qualities such as speed and payload had been a historic preoccupation of Britain operators to specifically tailor their services towards wealthy travellers, and noted that as having been a key pre-war ethos of the British airline Imperial Airways. Meanwhile, some figures within the aircraft industry were forecasting heavy demand from passengers then relying on ocean liners.

To meet these varied requirements, the Type 167 specified a huge 25-foot (7.6 m)-diameter fuselage, which was about 5 ft (1.5 m) greater than the 1970 Boeing 747 "jumbo jet", with full-length upper and lower decks. That enclosed sleeping berths for 80 passengers, a dining room, 37-seat cinema, promenade and bar or, alternatively, day seats for 150 people. At one point, the Committee recommended the adoption of a narrower fuselage to house a total of 50 passengers. The British Overseas Airways Corporation (BOAC) agreed with that recommendation, and also expressed its preference for a design accommodating only 25 passengers. In August 1943, an agreement with the airline led to the selection of an interior layout which contained a forward area housing six compartments, each one for six passengers, along with a seventh compartment for just three passengers, a midsection above the wing – the wing was 6 feet (1.8 m) deep at that point – which accommodated 38 seats arranged around tables in groups of four along with a pantry and galley, and a rear area with 23 seats in an aft-facing cinema, complete with a cocktail bar and lounge. Similar to the Saunders-Roe Princess, the Brabazon concept was a fusion of prewar and postwar thinking, using highly advanced design and engineering to build an aircraft that was no longer relevant in the postwar world.

The Brabazon was the first aircraft to be outfitted with 100 per cent powered flying controls; it was also the first with electric engine controls, and the first equipped with high-pressure hydraulics. The large span and mounting of the engines close inboard, together with structural weight economies, demanded some new measure to prevent bending of wing surfaces in turbulence. One of the innovative features of the Brabazon was a purpose-developed gust-alleviation system, which used an assortment of servos that were triggered from a gust-sensing probe installed on the exterior of the aircraft's nose; an improved version of this system, along with fully automated trimming, was to have been deployed on the Brabazon Mark II. (Note: According to aviation author Philip Kaplan, difficulties experienced in the development of the improved gust-alleviation system for the Brabazon Mark II played a major role in the ultimate cancellation of the project.) Hydraulic power units were also designed to operate the aircraft's giant control surfaces.

A tremendous effort was put into saving weight across the aircraft. The Type 167 used a number of non-standard gauges of skinning in order to tailor every panel to the strength required, thereby saving several tons of metal. Bristol employed revolutionary new machining and construction methods for drilling, milling, folding, and rolling many of the airframe's components. Rivets were sealed in aircraft dope to greatly reduce the number required for airframe assembly. Significant emphasis had been placed upon simplifying the construction process and incorporating several manufacturing efficiencies. Some of the design and construction work for the aircraft was shared out to other British companies, such as Folland Aircraft.

Manufacturing the Brabazon was found to be a challenge. During the first two years of the development, the question of how and where to manufacture the aircraft was amongst the biggest issues that had preoccupied the design team and delayed progress on the project. Bristol's existing factory at Bristol Filton Airport proved to be too small to handle what was one of the largest aircraft in the world, let alone producing the type in quantity, while the adjacent 2,000 ft (610 m) runway was too short for it to take off from. While considerations were made for developing the firm's Banwell facility, it was eventually decided to expand the main Filton site to suit the Brabazon. Work on the project was slowed as Bristol's wartime commitments had to be met. Amongst the early physical steps was the construction of a full-scale wooden mockup in the old No. 2 Flight Shed so that components and fittings could be applied and tested. In October 1945, construction of the first prototype's fuselage commenced in an existing hangar while a gigantic hall for performing final assembly of up to eight Brabazons was constructed; at the time of construction, the hall was the largest hangar in the world. The designer of the new assembly hall, T. P. O'Sullivan, was subsequently awarded the Telford Premium for the work. The runway was lengthened to 8,000 ft (2,440 m) and widened; this extension had necessitated the controversial compulsory relocation of the inhabitants of the village of Charlton to neighbouring Patchway.

=== Mark II ===
During the early 1940s, the only means for providing propulsion for large aircraft was to produce increasingly complex and enlarged radial engines. The emergence of jet propulsion, specifically the turboprop engine, happened to coincide with the Brabazon's development. Accordingly, there was considerable interest in using such an engine for the airliner as it potentially offered a simpler and more powerful alternative to the original Centaurus powerplant. Other advantages of turboprops included lower vibration levels, which would increase passenger comfort, and better performance at higher altitudes.

In 1946, it was decided to build the second prototype using eight paired Bristol Coupled Proteus turboprop engines driving four-bladed propellers through a common gearbox. This would have increased the Brabazon's cruising speed, from 260 to 330 mph (420 to 530 km/h; 230 to 290 kn), and its ceiling, while reducing the aircraft's empty weight by about 10,000 lb (4,500 kg). This Brabazon Mark II would have been able to cross the Atlantic from London to New York in a reduced time of 12 hours. However, by 1950, development of the Proteus engine had run into substantial difficulties, being overweight and underpowered, and subject to fatigue issues at one stage. Although the Proteus was slimmer than the Centaurus, the wing thickness was not reduced in the Mark II, but the leading edge would be extended around the engines.

Other planned changes for the Brabazon Mark II included a revised wheel arrangement which would enable the aircraft to use the majority of runways on both the North Atlantic and Empire routes.

=== Testing ===
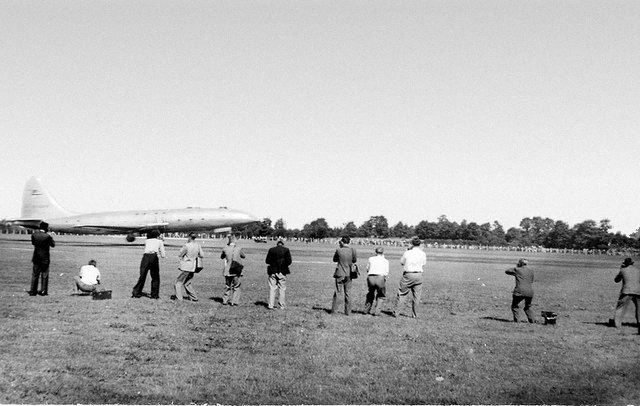
Bristol Brabazon G-AGPW takes off on its maiden flight on 4 September 1949 at Filton Aerodrome

In December 1945, Bristol Chief Test Pilot Bill Pegg was selected to be the chief pilot for the Brabazon. In preparation for the impending flight testing, as a means of gaining experience in operating such a vast aircraft, Pegg accepted an invitation by Convair to travel to Fort Worth, Texas, to fly their B-36 Peacemaker, a large strategic bomber operated by the United States Air Force.

During December 1948, the Mk.I prototype, registration G-AGPW, was rolled out for engine runs. On 3 September 1949, the prototype, piloted by Pegg and co-pilot Walter Gibb, along with a crew of eight observers and flight engineers, performed a series of trial taxi runs; these revealed no problems save for the nosewheel steering not working correctly; it was temporarily disabled. On 4 September 1949, the prototype performed its maiden flight over the Bristol area, flying for 25 minutes, captained by Pegg. Around 10,000 people gathered at the airfield's perimeter to witness the takeoff. During this flight, it climbed to about 3,000 ft (900 m) at 160 mph (260 km/h) and landed at 115 mph (185 km/h), throttling back at 50 ft (15 m). The British press reported favourably, one newspaper praising the aircraft as being "the queen of the skies, the largest land-plane ever built".

Four days later, the prototype was presented at Society of British Aircraft Constructors' Airshow at Farnborough; according to author Philip Kaplan, the timing of the first flight had been chosen to enable this high-profile early appearance. The Brabazon's appearance at Farnborough led to the adoption of a formal and deliberate company policy to carry out much of the aircraft's test programme in the vicinity of various British cities to spread public awareness. Accordingly, the Brabazon was demonstrated at the 1950 Farnborough Airshow, at which it performed a takeoff, clean configuration flypast and a landing. In June 1950, the Brabazon made a visit to London's Heathrow Airport, during which it made a number of successful takeoffs and landings; it was also demonstrated at the 1951 Paris Air Show. Gibb, who flew the aircraft as pilot-in-command on multiple flights, summarised his flying experiences with the type: "It was very comfortable. It flew very well. It was big. You didn't whip it around like a Tiger Moth or Spitfire, but as long as you treated it like a double-decker bus or a large aeroplane, you had no trouble at all".

While the Brabazon's flight tests were being performed, BOAC became increasingly uninterested with the prospects for operating the type. On a test flight, BOAC chairman Sir Miles Thomas briefly took the controls and found the aircraft to be underpowered and very slow to respond to the controls. BOAC quickly decided it was not for them. Bristol had been subject to financial hardship, while development of the Proteus engine intended to power the improved Brabazon Mark II was proving troublesome. Flight tests of the aircraft itself had revealed some fatigue issues in the inner wingbox area, (Note: As a result of engineering analysis performed during the program, it was found that the Brabazon's airframe had a fatigue life of 5,000 flying hours; according to aviation author Phillip Kaplan, this figure had been "far too low" for airworthiness certification to be realistically expected.) while the projected operating costs for the Brabazon had been revised upwards as the programme had proceeded. BOAC, was unconvinced of the aircraft's merits, ultimately chose not to place any order for the type. Gibb stated of the situation: "the spec wasn't correct for post-war flying. The people who wrote the specs... conceived an aeroplane with all this comfort, bunks, and a great dining room to eat in. And, of course, come the day, that wasn't what the airlines wanted. They wanted to ram as many passengers as possible into the tube and give 'em lunch on their laps."

At one point, although some interest was shown by British European Airways (BEA) for conducting operational flights using the prototype Brabazon itself, various problems that would typically be expected to be present on a prototype meant the aircraft would never receive an airworthiness certificate.

=== Cancellation ===
By 1952, about £3.4 million had been spent on development and there were no signs of purchase by any airline. In March, the British government announced that work on the second prototype had been postponed. The cancellation of the project was announced by the Minister of Supply (Duncan Sandys) on 17 July 1953 in the Commons, saying the programme had given all the useful technical knowledge it could but without any firm interest from either civil or military users, there was no justification for continuing to spend money on the Brabazon. By this point, roughly £6 million had been spent on the programme and a further £2 million would have been required in order to complete the Mark II. In October 1953, after 164 flights totalling 382 hours' flying time, the first prototype was broken up and sold for £10,000 in scrap value, along with the uncompleted Mk.II prototype. All that remains are a few parts at the M Shed museum in Bristol and the National Museum of Flight in Scotland.

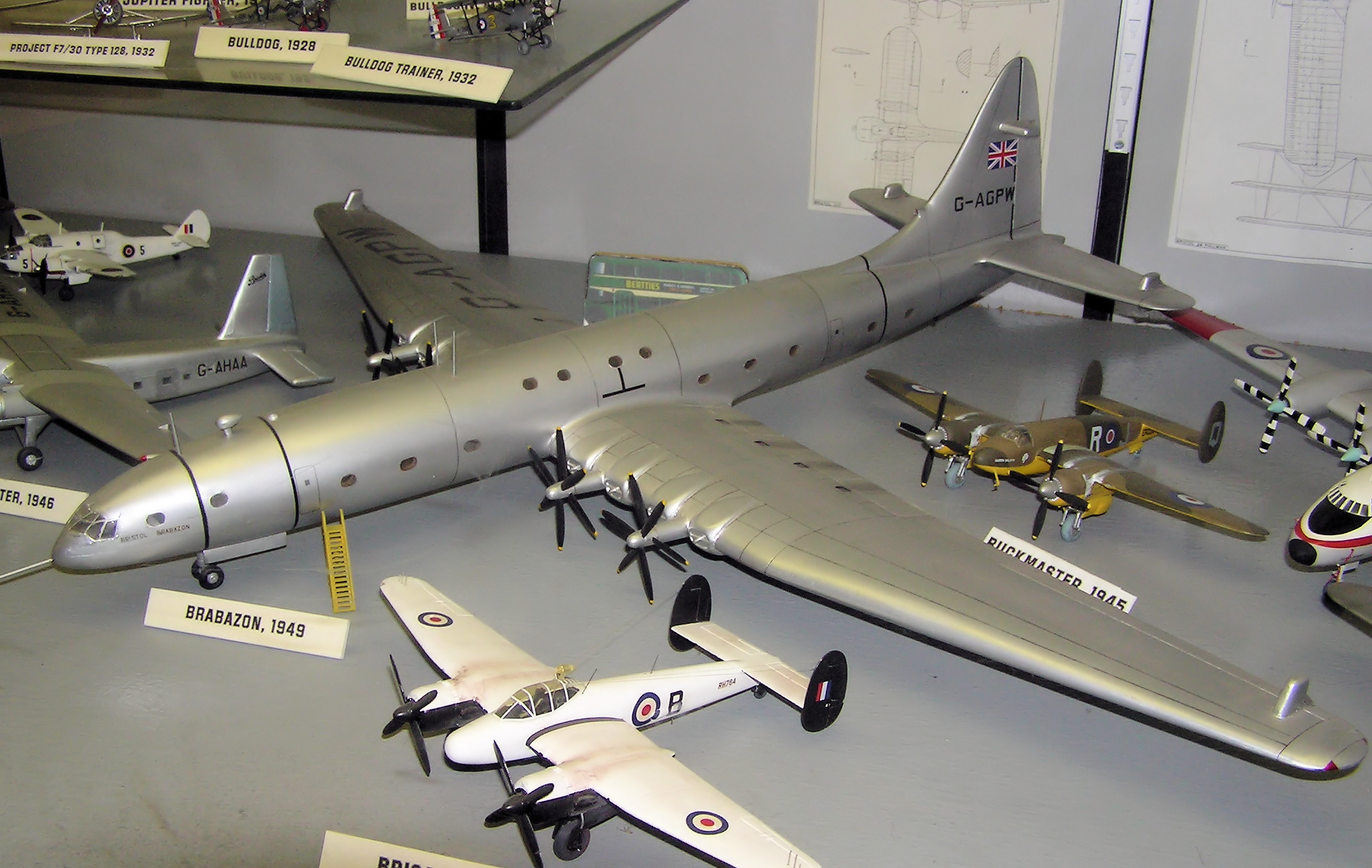
Brabazon model

Although considered a failure and a white elephant, the record of the Brabazon is not entirely unfavourable. At least half of the large sums spent on the project had been expended upon the construction of infrastructure, including £6 million for new large hangars and an extended runway at Filton. These improvements meant that Bristol was in an excellent position to continue production of other designs; the assembly hall was soon being used for building another transatlantic aircraft, the Britannia. The same assembly hall was later used in construction of the Concorde. In addition, many of the techniques which had been developed during the Brabazon project were applicable to any aircraft, not just airliners.

Bristol had also been awarded the contract for the Type III aircraft, for which they delivered the Britannia. By making use of the advances made during the development of the Brabazon, Bristol were able to design the Britannia to possess the best payload fraction of any aircraft up to that time, and it held that record for a number of years. Although the Britannia was delayed after problems with the separate Type IV, the jet-powered de Havilland Comet, it went on to be a workhorse for many airlines into the 1970s.

== Specifications (Mark I) ==
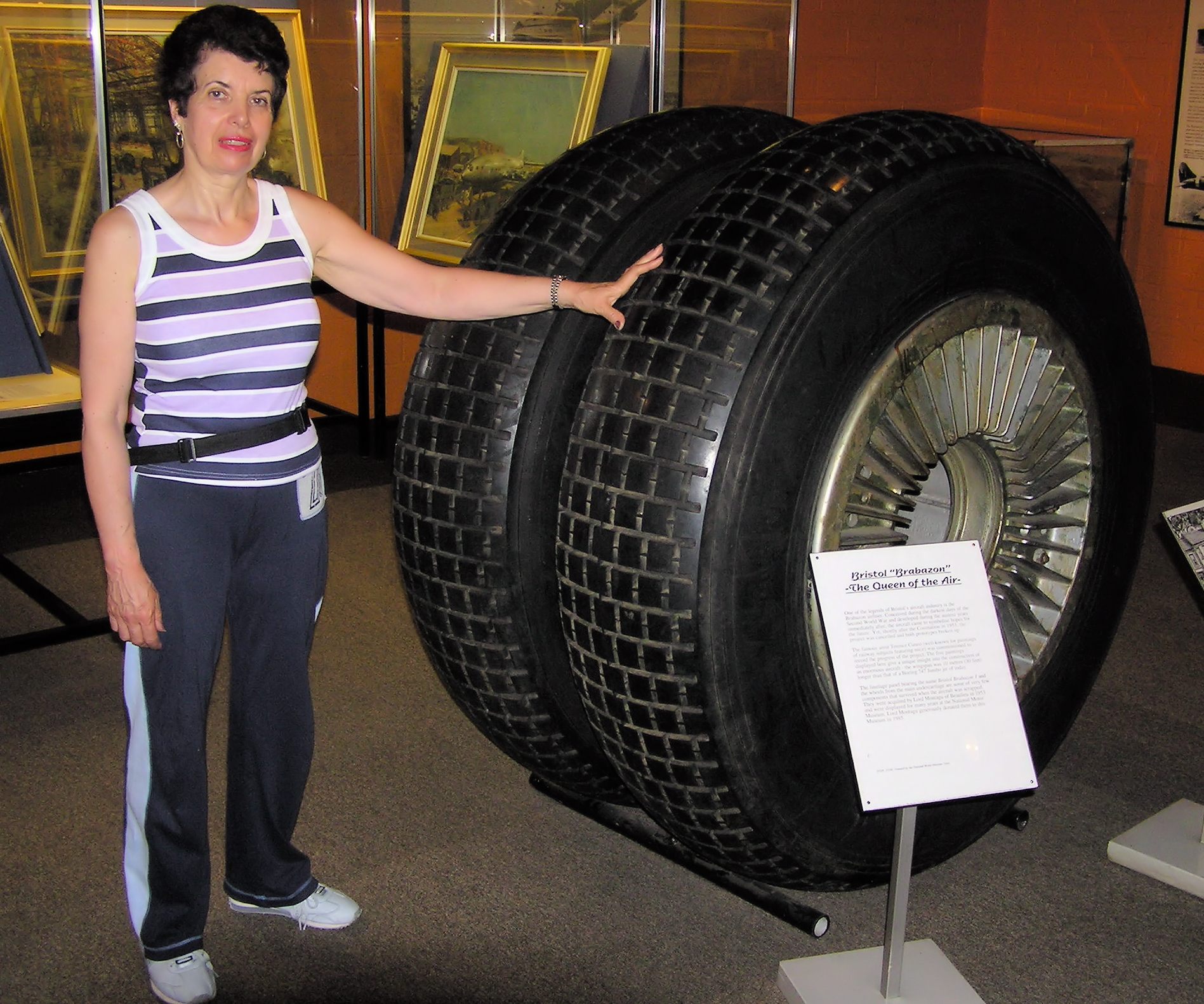
Bristol Brabazon main undercarriage wheels.

Data from Flight International.

General characteristics

- Crew: 6–12
- Capacity: 100 passengers
- Length: 177 ft (54 m)
- Wingspan: 230 ft (70 m)
- Height: 50 ft (15 m)
- Wing area: 5,317 sq ft (494.0 m^{2})
- Airfoil: root: T.P.4; tip: T.P.5
- Empty weight: 145,100 lb (65,816 kg)
- Max takeoff weight: 290,000 lb (131,542 kg)
- Fuel capacity: 13,650 imp gal (16,393 US gal; 62,054 L)
- Powerplant: 8 × Bristol Centaurus 18-cylinder air-cooled radial sleeve-valve piston engines, 2,650 hp (1,980 kW) each paired, driving contra-props through combining gearboxes.
- Propellers: 3-bladed Rotol, 16 ft (4.9 m) diameter fully-feathering contra-rotating propellers

Performance

- Maximum speed: 300 mph (480 km/h, 260 kn) at 25,000 ft (7,620 m)
- Cruise speed: 250 mph (400 km/h, 220 kn) at 25,000 ft (7,620 m)
- Range: 5,500 mi (8,900 km, 4,800 nmi)
- Service ceiling: 25,000 ft (7,600 m)
- Rate of climb: 750 ft/min (3.8 m/s)
- Wing loading: 54 lb/sq ft (260 kg/m^{2})
- Power/mass: 0.073 hp/lb (0.120 kW/kg)

== See also ==
- Convair XC-99 – American prototype cargo plane (1949–57)
- Hughes H-4 Hercules – American World War II heavy flying boat
- Saunders-Roe Princess – British 1952 airliner flying boat

Related lists

- List of civil aircraft
