= Lord Lieutenant of Bristol =

Ceremonial official in Bristol, England

Lord-Lieutenant of Bristol
- Incumbent: Peaches Golding
- Preceded by: Mary Prior

This is a list of Lord-Lieutenants of the County and City of Bristol.

The position of Lord-Lieutenant of Bristol was created on 1 April 1996, when the county of Avon was abolished. Before then, the city was part of the Avon lieutenancy between 1974 and 1996, and before that it was part of the Gloucestershire lieutenancy, with the exception of a period from 1660 to 1672, when it was part of the Somerset lieutenancy.

== Lord-Lieutenants of Bristol to 1974 ==
- see Lord Lieutenant of Gloucestershire before the English Restoration
- Henry Somerset, Lord Herbert 30 July 1660 – 22 December 1660
- James Butler, 1st Duke of Ormonde 22 December 1660 – 22 August 1672
- Henry Somerset, 1st Duke of Beaufort 22 August 1672 – 22 March 1689
- see Lord-Lieutenant of Gloucestershire to 1974

== Lord-Lieutenants of Bristol from 1996 ==
- Sir James Tidmarsh 1 April 1996 – 2007
- Mary Prior 17 September 2007 – 2017
- Peaches Golding 24 April 2017 to present.
