= Peaches Golding =

British business executive

Captain Peaches Golding OBE CStJ RNR
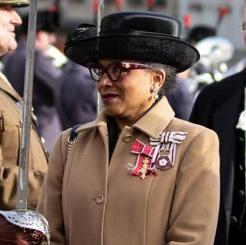
- Born: Lois Patricia Hauser; 1953 (age 72–73); Spartanburg, South Carolina, U.S.
- Other name: Peaches Golding
- Education: Richard J. Reynolds High School; University of North Carolina at Chapel Hill
- Occupations: Marketing and sustainability consultant
- Employer: Moon Consulting Limited
- Title: former High Sheriff of Bristol; Lord Lieutenant of Bristol
- Term: 2010–11 (High Sheriff); 2017–present (Lord Lieutenant)
- Predecessor: Timothy Lachlan Chambers (as High Sheriff); Mary Prior (as Lord Lieutenant)
- Successor: John Cottrell (as High Sheriff)
- Board member of: ITV West; GWR West; Avon & Somerset Police Authority; University of the West of England; North Bristol NHS Trust; General Chiropractic Council; SS Great Britain
- Spouse: Bob Golding (d. 2022)
- Awards: Honorary MBA, University of the West of England 2010; OBE; CStJ
- Website: https://www.lordltbristol.org.uk/

Lois Patricia Golding OBE CStJ, commonly known as Peaches Golding (born 1953), is an American-British business executive, administrator, and former academic who is Lord-Lieutenant of the County and City of Bristol. On her 2010 appointment as High Sheriff of Bristol, she was the second Black person and the first Black woman to hold the position. She was appointed Honorary Captain of the Royal Naval Reserve in June 2020.

== Early life and education ==
Peaches Golding was born Lois Patricia Hauser on 13 December 1953, in Spartanburg, South Carolina, US, one of two daughters of Charlie Brady Hauser and his wife Lois Elizabeth Brown. Her father was an educator who won a settlement of $2000 from the Atlantic Greyhound Bus Company in 1947 after having been arrested for refusing to move to the back of a bus, eight years before that of Rosa Parks. He had served in the US Army during World War II and later for two terms in the North Carolina General Assembly in the early 1980s.

Golding was educated at Richard J. Reynolds High School, Winston-Salem, North Carolina, where she earned second place in a talent competition in 1970, performing Liszt's Hungarian Rhapsody No. 2. In 1971, she attended the Governor's School of North Carolina. She then studied biology at the University of North Carolina at Chapel Hill, graduating in 1976.

== Career ==
After graduation Golding worked as a teacher at the University of Ibadan and Loyola College in Ibadan, Nigeria, West Africa. After meeting her husband, in 1983 she moved with him to Bristol, where she established a marketing and communications business with clients including the Office for the Deputy Prime Minister, the Department for Education and Employment on its New Deal initiative, the Government Office for the South West, several Training and Enterprise Councils in the South West and Business Link. She was employed by Business in the Community, both as a consultant and an employee, over a period of 17 years as deputy director of the Race for Opportunity campaign, Regional Director and Director of Special Projects.

She has served on a number of public bodies and private sector organisations, including as non-executive director of Avon and Wiltshire Mental Health Partnership NHS Trust, regional director of Business in the Community, North Bristol NHS Trust, GWR West, a member of the Ethnic Minority Business Forum, the Home Office representative on the Avon & Somerset Police Authority, governor of the University of the West of England, governor of the City of Bristol College, Regional Advisory Council for ITV West and as a member of the General Chiropractic Council. Since 2011 she has worked as a non-executive consultant for Moon Executive Search.

In 2010, she was appointed High Sheriff of Bristol, the first Black woman to be appointed by the Sovereign to the post and the second Black person, the first being Nathaniel Wells, the son of a Welsh merchant and a Black slave, in 1818. In 2017 she was appointed as the first black female Lord Lieutenant of Bristol.

== Honours ==
In 2009, Golding was made an Officer of the Order of the British Empire (OBE) for services to minority ethnic people in the South-West of England. The University of the West of England awarded her an honorary degree of Master of Business Administration. In 2020, she was appointed Honorary Captain Royal Naval Reserve and awarded Commander of the Order of St John (CStJ).

== Personal life ==
Golding lives in Bristol. She was married to Bob Golding, a zoologist and the former director of the Zoological Garden at the University of Ibadan in Nigeria; he died in January 2022.
