= Greater Bristol =

Conurbation around the city of Bristol, England

Coordinates: 51°28′N 2°35′W

Greater Bristol is a term used for the conurbation which contains and surrounds the city of Bristol in the South West of England. There is no official "Greater Bristol" authority, but the term is sometimes used by local, regional and national authorities, and others as a synonym for either the "Bristol Urban Area" or a wider area of the former County of Avon (sometimes the whole of the former County of Avon area), and by some, TfGB (Transport for Greater Bristol), to refer to the Province of Bristol as defined by C. B. Fawcett (1919) or Derek Senior (1969).

== Definitions ==
=== Bristol Built-up Area ===
One definition of "Greater Bristol" is the "Bristol Built-up Area" (previously termed the "Bristol Urban Area"), as defined by the UK Office for National Statistics (ONS). This covers the contiguous built-up area around Bristol, including the towns and villages of Kingswood, Mangotsfield, Stoke Gifford, Bradley Stoke, Patchway, Filton, Almondsbury, Frampton Cotterell and Winterbourne in South Gloucestershire; Pill, Leigh Woods and Easton-in-Gordano within North Somerset; and part of Whitchurch which falls within the administrative area of Bath and North East Somerset. However, this ONS definition does not include the city of Bath, or the towns of Yate, Keynsham, Portishead, Clevedon or Weston-super-Mare.

The ONS give a figure for the population of the Bristol Urban Area of 617,280, making it the eleventh largest conurbation in England and Wales. The 2001 census figure was 551,006 and the 1991 census figure was 522,784. The urban area is subdivided into the following:

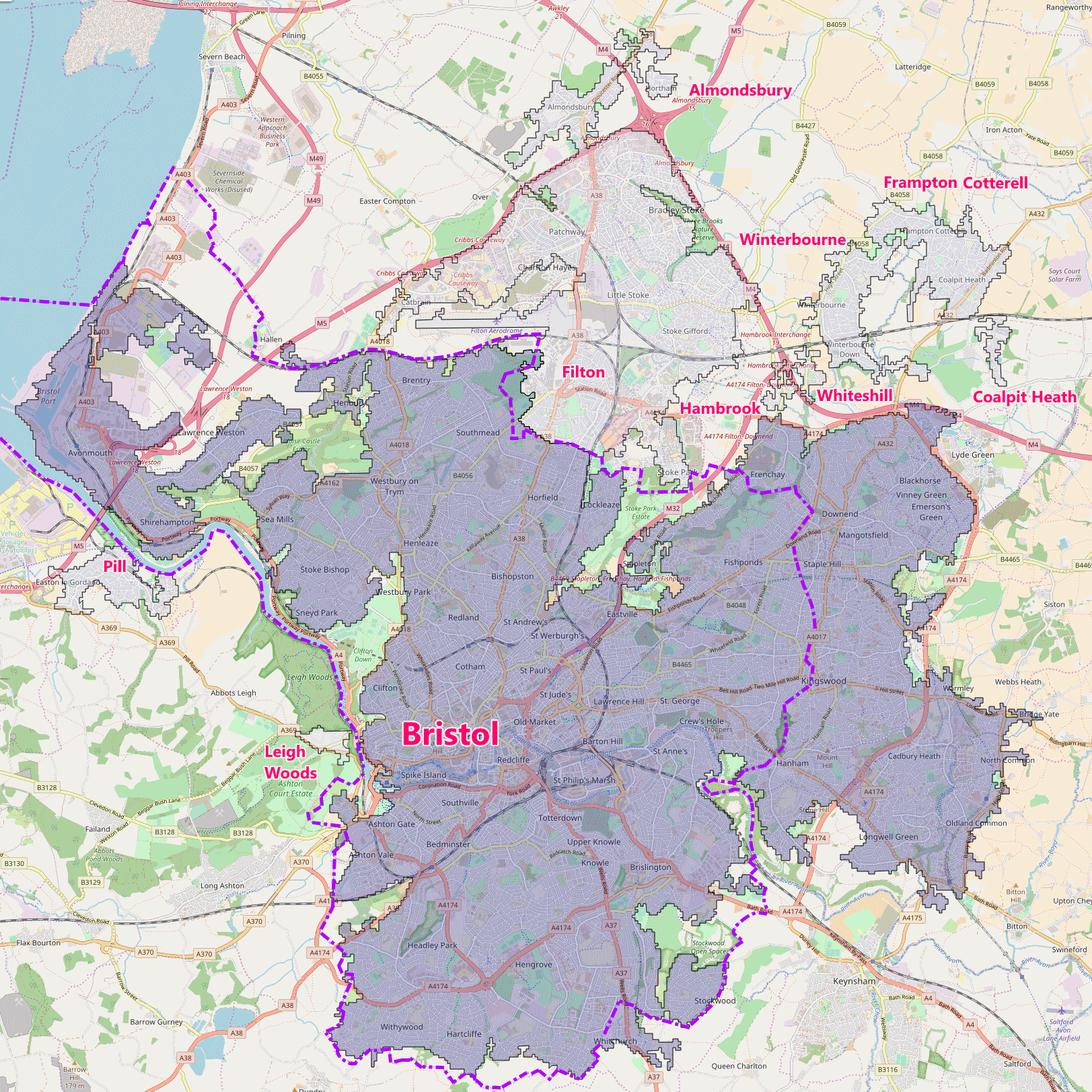
Bristol Built-up Area and its urban subdivisions in 2011 Bristol subdivision Other subdivisions City of Bristol unitary authority boundary

Urban subdivision	Population Census 2011
Bristol	535,907
Filton	59,495
Frampton Cotterell & Winterbourne	14,694
Pill	4,828
Almondsbury	855
Leigh Woods	553
Whiteshill	403
Hambrook	349
Coalpit Heath	196
Total	617,280

=== Former Avon County ===
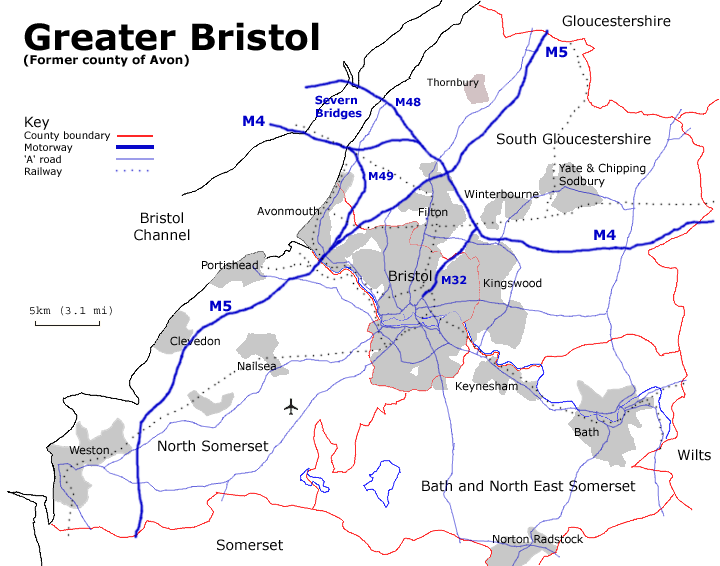
Map of the former Avon area. The term "Greater Bristol" is used by some to denote the whole of this area, and by others only to denote the contiguous urban area including, for example, Filton and Kingswood (which are outside Bristol's administrative boundary), but not Bath or Weston-super-Mare.

The wider "Greater Bristol" area – that is, the former Avon county area – has since 1996 been divided for local government purposes between Bristol City Council, and Bath and North East Somerset, North Somerset, and South Gloucestershire councils, and is shown on the map on this page. The boundaries of the County of Avon, which administered the area from 1974 to 1996, were similar to those of the Bristol travel to work area as originally defined in the 1950s. The former county area is still used in some official UK statistics and by local and regional authorities, for example in transport planning, with the South West Regional Government Office commissioning a Greater Bristol Strategic Transport Study in 2005, and the local authorities presenting a Joint Local Transport Plan to the DfT in 2006. Other alternative names occasionally in official use for the former Avon area include the West of England and Severnside. The term "CUBA" (county that used to be Avon) has also occasionally been used unofficially.

The 2001 population of the former county of Avon would have had a population of 983,860.

=== West of England ===
The West of England combined authority area covers the former county of Avon excluding North Somerset. In 2017, the West of England Combined Authority reported the population of the area to be 1.1 million.

=== Other ===
Transport for Greater Bristol (TfGB) has also used 'Greater Bristol' to refer to a travel to work area of 50 miles radius around Bristol which it wishes to be covered by an Integrated Transport Authority (ITA). This is similar to the 'Province of Bristol' described by geographer C. B. Fawcett in 1919.

== See also ==
- Avon Green Belt
- List of places in Bristol
- MetroBus (Bristol)
- MetroWest (Bristol)
- North Fringe of Bristol
- Transport in Bristol
- West of England
- West of England Combined Authority
