= Results of the 2019 United Kingdom general election =

A cartogram showing the popular vote in each constituency.

These are the results of the 2019 United Kingdom general election.

== Results by constituency ==
The results of the 2019 general election by constituency were as follows:

=== England ===
Constituency	County	Region	2017 result	2019 winning party				Turnout (Note: Excludes spoilt ballots)	Votes						
Constituency	County	Region	2017 result	Party	Votes	Share	Majority	Turnout	Con	Lab (Note: Includes Labour Party and allied Co-operative Party) (Note: Excludes Speaker)	LD	Grn	Brx	Other (Note: Includes all other parties, all independent candidates and the Speaker)	Total
Aldershot	HAM	SE	Con	Con	27,980	58.4%	16,698	66.0%	27,980	11,282	6,920	1,750			47,932
Aldridge-Brownhills	WMD	WM	Con	Con	27,850	70.5%	19,836	65.4%	27,850	8,014	2,371	771		336	39,342
Altrincham and Sale West	GTM	NW	Con	Con	26,311	48.0%	6,139	74.9%	26,311	20,172	6,036	1,566		778	54,863
Amber Valley	DBY	EM	Con	Con	29,096	63.9%	16,886	65.1%	29,096	12,210	2,873	1,388			45,567
Arundel and South Downs	WSX	SE	Con	Con	35,566	57.9%	22,521	75.1%	35,566	9,722	13,045	2,519		556	61,408
Ashfield	NTT	EM	Lab	Con	19,231	39.3%	5,733	62.6%	19,231	11,971	1,105	674	2,501	13,498	48,980
Ashford	KEN	SE	Con	Con	37,270	62.1%	24,029	67.1%	37,270	13,241	6,048	2,638		862	60,059
Ashton-under-Lyne	GTM	NW	Lab	Lab	18,544	48.1%	4,263	56.3%	14,281	18,544	1,395	1,208	3,151		38,579
Aylesbury	BKM	SE	Con	Con	32,737	54.0%	17,373	69.9%	32,737	15,364	10,081	2,394			60,576
Banbury	OXF	SE	Con	Con	34,148	54.3%	16,813	69.8%	34,148	17,335	8,831	2,607			62,921
Barking	LND	LND	Lab	Lab	27,219	61.2%	15,427	57.1%	11,792	27,219	1,482	820	3,186		44,499
Barnsley Central	SYK	YTH	Lab	Lab	14,804	40.1%	3,571	56.5%	7,892	14,804	1,176	900	11,233	898	36,903
Barnsley East	SYK	YTH	Lab	Lab	14,329	37.6%	3,217	54.8%	10,377	14,329	1,330	922	11,112		38,070
Barrow and Furness	CMA	NW	Lab	Con	23,876	51.9%	5,789	65.6%	23,876	18,087	2,025	703	1,355		46,046
Basildon and Billericay	ESS	E	Con	Con	29,590	67.1%	20,412	63.1%	29,590	9,178	3,741	1,395		224	44,128
Basingstoke	HAM	SE	Con	Con	29,593	54.1%	14,198	66.0%	29,593	15,395	6,841	2,138		746	54,713
Bassetlaw	NTT	EM	Lab	Con	28,078	55.2%	14,013	63.5%	28,078	14,065	3,332		5,366		50,841
Bath	AVN	SW	LD	LD	28,419	54.5%	12,322	77.2%	16,097	6,639	28,419		642	341	52,138
Batley and Spen	WYK	YTH	Lab	Lab	22,594	42.7%	3,525	66.5%	19,069	22,594	2,462	692	1,678	6,432	52,927
Battersea	LND	LND	Lab	Lab	27,290	45.5%	5,668	75.6%	21,622	27,290	9,150	1,529	386		59,977
Beaconsfield	BKM	SE	Con	Con	32,477	56.1%	15,712	74.5%	32,477	5,756		2,033		17,602	57,868
Beckenham	LND	LND	Con	Con	27,282	54.0%	14,258	73.6%	27,282	13,024	8,194	2,055			50,555
Bedford	BDF	E	Lab	Lab	20,491	43.3%	145	66.1%	20,346	20,491	4,608	960	896		47,301
Bermondsey and Old Southwark	LND	LND	Lab	Lab	31,723	54.1%	16,126	62.8%	9,678	31,723	15,597		1,617		58,615
Berwick-upon-Tweed	NBL	NE	Con	Con	23,947	56.9%	14,835	70.3%	23,947	9,112	7,656	1,394			42,109
Bethnal Green and Bow	LND	LND	Lab	Lab	44,052	72.7%	37,524	68.7%	6,528	44,052	5,892	2,570	1,081	439	60,562
Beverley and Holderness	HUM	YTH	Con	Con	33,250	62.1%	20,448	67.2%	33,250	12,802	4,671	1,378		1,441	53,542
Bexhill and Battle	SXE	SE	Con	Con	37,590	63.6%	26,059	72.1%	37,590	11,531	7,280	2,692			59,093
Bexleyheath and Crayford	LND	LND	Con	Con	25,856	59.8%	13,103	66.1%	25,856	12,753	2,819	1,298		520	43,246
Birkenhead	MSY	NW	Lab	Lab	24,990	59.0%	17,705	66.4%	5,540	24,990	1,620	1,405	1,489	7,285	42,329
Birmingham Edgbaston	WMD	WM	Lab	Lab	21,217	50.1%	5,614	61.5%	15,603	21,217	3,349	1,112	1,047		42,328
Birmingham Erdington	WMD	WM	Lab	Lab	17,720	50.3%	3,601	53.3%	14,119	17,720	1,301	648	1,441		35,229
Birmingham Hall Green	WMD	WM	Lab	Lab	35,889	67.8%	28,508	65.9%	7,381	35,889	3,673	818	877	4,273	52,911
Birmingham Hodge Hill	WMD	WM	Lab	Lab	35,397	78.7%	28,655	57.5%	6,742	35,397	760	328	1,519	257	45,003
Birmingham Ladywood	WMD	WM	Lab	Lab	33,355	79.2%	28,582	56.2%	4,773	33,355	2,228	931	831		42,118
Birmingham Northfield	WMD	WM	Lab	Con	19,957	46.3%	1,640	58.5%	19,957	18,317	1,961	954	1,655	254	43,098
Birmingham Perry Barr	WMD	WM	Lab	Lab	26,594	63.1%	15,317	58.5%	11,277	26,594	1,901	845	1,382	148	42,147
Birmingham Selly Oak	WMD	WM	Lab	Lab	27,714	56.0%	12,414	59.8%	15,300	27,714	3,169	1,848	1,436		49,467
Birmingham Yardley	WMD	WM	Lab	Lab	23,379	54.8%	10,659	57.1%	12,720	23,379	3,754	579	2,246		42,678
Bishop Auckland	DUR	NE	Lab	Con	24,067	53.7%	7,692	65.7%	24,067	16,105	2,133		2,500		44,805
Blackburn	LAN	NW	Lab	Lab	29,040	64.9%	18,304	62.8%	10,736	29,040	1,130	741	2,770	319	44,736
Blackley and Broughton	GTM	NW	Lab	Lab	23,887	61.9%	14,402	52.8%	9,485	23,887	1,590	920	2,736		38,618
Blackpool North and Cleveleys	LAN	NW	Con	Con	22,364	57.6%	8,596	60.9%	22,364	13,768	1,494	735		443	38,804
Blackpool South	LAN	NW	Lab	Con	16,247	49.6%	3,690	56.8%	16,247	12,557	1,008	563	2,009	368	32,752
Blaydon	TWR	NE	Lab	Lab	19,794	43.3%	5,531	67.3%	14,263	19,794	3,703	1,279	5,833	809	45,681
Blyth Valley	NBL	NE	Lab	Con	17,440	42.7%	712	64.6%	17,440	16,728	2,151	1,146	3,394		40,859
Bognor Regis and Littlehampton	WSX	SE	Con	Con	32,521	63.5%	22,503	66.1%	32,521	10,018	5,645	1,826		1,213	51,223
Bolsover	DBY	EM	Lab	Con	21,791	47.4%	5,299	61.1%	21,791	16,492	1,759	758	4,151	987	45,938
Bolton North East	GTM	NW	Lab	Con	19,759	45.4%	378	64.5%	19,759	19,381	1,847	689	1,880		43,556
Bolton South East	GTM	NW	Lab	Lab	21,516	53.0%	7,598	58.7%	13,918	21,516	1,411	791	2,968		40,604
Bolton West	GTM	NW	Con	Con	27,255	55.3%	8,885	67.4%	27,255	18,400	2,704	939			49,298
Bootle	MSY	NW	Lab	Lab	39,066	79.4%	34,556	65.7%	4,510	39,066	1,822	1,166	2,610		49,174
Boston and Skegness	LIN	EM	Con	Con	31,963	76.7%	25,621	60.2%	31,963	6,342	1,963			1,428	41,696
Bosworth	LEI	EM	Con	Con	36,056	63.9%	26,278	69.2%	36,056	9,778	9,096	1,502			56,432
Bournemouth East	DOR	SW	Con	Con	24,926	50.6%	8,176	66.5%	24,926	16,120	5,418	2,049		761	49,274
Bournemouth West	DOR	SW	Con	Con	24,550	53.4%	10,150	62.0%	24,550	14,400	4,931	2,096			45,977
Bracknell	BRK	SE	Con	Con	31,894	58.7%	19,829	68.6%	31,894	12,065	7,749	2,089		553	54,350
Bradford East	WYK	YTH	Lab	Lab	27,825	63.0%	18,144	60.4%	9,681	27,825	3,316	662	2,700		44,184
Bradford South	WYK	YTH	Lab	Lab	18,390	46.3%	2,346	57.6%	16,044	18,390	1,505	983	2,819		39,741
Bradford West	WYK	YTH	Lab	Lab	33,736	76.2%	27,019	62.6%	6,717	33,736	1,349	813	1,556	90	44,261
Braintree	ESS	E	Con	Con	34,112	67.5%	24,673	67.1%	34,112	9,439	4,779			2,169	50,499
Brent Central	LND	LND	Lab	Lab	31,779	64.7%	20,870	58.3%	10,909	31,779	4,844	1,600			49,132
Brent North	LND	LND	Lab	Lab	26,911	51.9%	8,079	61.9%	18,832	26,911	4,065	850	951	270	51,879
Brentford and Isleworth	LND	LND	Lab	Lab	29,266	50.2%	10,514	68.0%	18,752	29,266	7,314	1,829	1,165		58,326
Brentwood and Ongar	ESS	E	Con	Con	36,308	68.6%	29,065	70.4%	36,308	7,243	7,187	1,671		532	52,941
Bridgwater and West Somerset	SOM	SW	Con	Con	35,827	62.1%	24,439	67.9%	35,827	11,388	7,805	1,877		755	57,652
Brigg and Goole	HUM	YTH	Con	Con	30,941	71.3%	21,941	65.8%	30,941	9,000	2,180	1,281			43,402
Brighton Kemptown	SXE	SE	Lab	Lab	25,033	51.6%	8,061	69.5%	16,972	25,033	2,964	2,237	1,327		48,533
Brighton Pavilion	SXE	SE	Grn	Grn	33,151	57.2%	19,940	73.4%	10,176	13,211		33,151	770	690	57,998
Bristol East	AVN	SW	Lab	Lab	27,717	53.1%	10,794	70.6%	16,923	27,717	3,527	2,106	1,881		52,154
Bristol North West	AVN	SW	Lab	Lab	27,330	48.9%	5,692	73.3%	21,638	27,330	4,940	1,977			55,885
Bristol South	AVN	SW	Lab	Lab	27,895	50.5%	9,859	65.6%	18,036	27,895	4,227	2,713	2,325		55,196
Bristol West	AVN	SW	Lab	Lab	47,028	62.3%	28,219	76.1%	8,822	47,028		18,809	869		75,528
Broadland	NFK	E	Con	Con	33,934	59.6%	21,861	72.9%	33,934	12,073	9,195	1,412		363	56,977
Bromley and Chislehurst	LND	LND	Con	Con	23,958	52.6%	10,891	68.3%	23,958	13,067	6,621	1,546		374	45,566
Bromsgrove	HWR	WM	Con	Con	34,408	63.4%	23,106	72.6%	34,408	11,302	6,779	1,783			54,272
Broxbourne	HRT	E	Con	Con	30,631	65.6%	19,807	63.8%	30,631	10,824	3,970	1,281			46,706
Broxtowe	NTT	EM	Con	Con	26,602	48.1%	5,331	75.7%	26,602	21,271		1,806		5,593	55,272
Buckingham	BKM	SE	Spkr	Con	37,035	58.4%	20,411	76.3%	37,035	7,638	16,624		1,286	875	63,458
Burnley	LAN	NW	Lab	Con	15,720	40.3%	1,352	60.6%	15,720	14,368	3,501	739	3,362	1,294	38,984
Burton	STS	WM	Con	Con	29,560	60.7%	14,496	65.0%	29,560	15,064	2,681	1,433			48,738
Bury North	GTM	NW	Lab	Con	21,660	46.2%	105	68.1%	21,660	21,555	1,584	802	1,240		46,841
Bury South	GTM	NW	Lab	Con	22,034	43.8%	402	66.9%	22,034	21,632	2,315	848	1,672	1,773	50,274
Bury St Edmunds	SFK	E	Con	Con	37,770	61.0%	24,988	69.1%	37,770	12,782		9,711		1,694	61,957
Calder Valley	WYK	YTH	Con	Con	29,981	51.9%	5,774	72.9%	29,981	24,207	2,884			721	57,793
Camberwell and Peckham	LND	LND	Lab	Lab	40,258	71.3%	33,780	63.4%	6,478	40,258	5,087	3,501	1,041	127	56,492
Camborne and Redruth	CUL	SW	Con	Con	26,764	53.1%	8,700	71.7%	26,764	18,064	3,504	1,359		676	50,367
Cambridge	CAM	E	Lab	Lab	25,776	48.0%	9,639	67.2%	8,342	25,776	16,137	2,164	1,041	269	53,729
Cannock Chase	STS	WM	Con	Con	31,636	68.3%	19,879	61.9%	31,636	11,757		2,920			46,313
Canterbury	KEN	SE	Lab	Lab	29,018	48.3%	1,836	75.0%	27,182	29,018	3,408			505	60,113
Carlisle	CMA	NW	Con	Con	23,659	55.2%	8,289	65.9%	23,659	15,340	2,829			1,045	42,873
Carshalton and Wallington	LND	LND	LD	Con	20,822	42.4%	629	67.3%	20,822	6,081	20,193	759	1,043	200	49,098
Castle Point	ESS	E	Con	Con	33,971	76.7%	26,634	63.6%	33,971	7,337	2,969				44,277
Central Devon	DEV	SW	Con	Con	32,095	55.3%	17,721	77.5%	32,095	14,374	8,770	2,833			58,072
Central Suffolk and North Ipswich	SFK	E	Con	Con	35,253	62.7%	23,351	73.8%	35,253	11,862	6,485	2,650			56,250
Charnwood	LEI	EM	Con	Con	35,121	63.4%	22,397	69.6%	35,121	12,724	4,856	2,664			55,365
Chatham and Aylesford	KEN	SE	Con	Con	28,856	66.6%	18,540	59.1%	28,856	10,316	2,866	1,090		212	43,340
Cheadle	GTM	NW	Con	Con	25,694	46.0%	2,336	74.9%	25,694	6,851	23,358				55,903
Chelmsford	ESS	E	Con	Con	31,934	55.9%	17,621	71.0%	31,934	10,295	14,313			580	57,122
Chelsea and Fulham	LND	LND	Con	Con	23,345	49.9%	11,241	69.8%	23,345	10,872	12,104			500	46,821
Cheltenham	GLS	SW	Con	Con	28,486	48.0%	981	73.2%	28,486	2,921	27,505			445	59,357
Chesham and Amersham	BKM	SE	Con	Con	30,850	55.4%	16,223	76.8%	30,850	7,166	14,627	3,042			55,685
Chesterfield	DBY	EM	Lab	Lab	18,171	40.2%	1,451	63.6%	16,720	18,171	3,985	1,148	4,771	391	45,186
Chichester	WSX	SE	Con	Con	35,402	57.8%	21,490	71.6%	35,402	9,069	13,912	2,527		333	61,243
Chingford and Woodford Green	LND	LND	Con	Con	23,481	48.5%	1,262	74.1%	23,481	22,219	2,744				48,444
Chippenham	WIL	SW	Con	Con	30,994	54.3%	11,288	73.9%	30,994	6,399	19,706				57,099
Chipping Barnet	LND	LND	Con	Con	25,745	44.7%	1,212	72.0%	25,745	24,533	5,932	1,288		71	57,569
Chorley	LAN	NW	Lab	Spkr	26,831	67.3%	17,392	51.0%				3,600		36,270	39,870
Christchurch	DOR	SW	Con	Con	33,894	65.2%	24,617	72.6%	33,894	6,568	9,277	2,212			51,951
Cities of London and Westminster	LND	LND	Con	Con	17,049	39.9%	3,953	67.1%	17,049	11,624	13,096	728		226	42,723
City of Chester	CHS	NW	Lab	Lab	27,082	49.6%	6,164	71.7%	20,918	27,082	3,734	1,438	1,388		54,560
City of Durham	DUR	NE	Lab	Lab	20,531	42.0%	5,025	68.6%	15,506	20,531	7,935	1,635	3,252		48,859
Clacton	ESS	E	Con	Con	31,438	72.3%	24,702	61.3%	31,438	6,736	2,541	1,225		1,566	43,506
Cleethorpes	HUM	YTH	Con	Con	31,969	69.0%	21,418	62.9%	31,969	10,551	2,535	1,284			46,339
Colchester	ESS	E	Con	Con	26,917	50.4%	9,423	64.6%	26,917	17,494	7,432	1,530			53,373
Colne Valley	WYK	YTH	Lab	Con	29,482	48.4%	5,103	72.4%	29,482	24,379	3,815	1,068	1,286	880	60,910
Congleton	CHS	NW	Con	Con	33,747	59.0%	18,561	70.7%	33,747	15,186	6,026	1,616		658	57,233
Copeland	CMA	NW	Con	Con	22,856	53.7%	5,842	68.9%	22,856	17,014	1,888	765			42,523
Corby	NTH	EM	Con	Con	33,410	55.2%	10,268	70.2%	33,410	23,142	3,932				60,484
Coventry North East	WMD	WM	Lab	Lab	23,412	52.7%	7,692	58.5%	15,720	23,412	2,061	1,141	2,110		44,444
Coventry North West	WMD	WM	Lab	Lab	20,918	43.8%	208	63.5%	20,710	20,918	2,717	1,443	1,956		47,744
Coventry South	WMD	WM	Lab	Lab	19,544	43.4%	401	63.5%	19,143	19,544	3,398	1,092	1,432	435	45,044
Crawley	WSX	SE	Con	Con	27,040	54.2%	8,360	67.2%	27,040	18,680	2,728	1,451			49,899
Crewe and Nantwich	CHS	NW	Lab	Con	28,704	53.1%	8,508	67.3%	28,704	20,196	2,618	975	1,390	149	54,032
Croydon Central	LND	LND	Lab	Lab	27,124	50.2%	5,949	66.4%	21,175	27,124	3,532	1,215	999		54,045
Croydon North	LND	LND	Lab	Lab	36,495	65.6%	24,673	62.9%	11,822	36,495	4,476	1,629	839	348	55,609
Croydon South	LND	LND	Con	Con	30,985	52.2%	12,339	70.7%	30,985	18,646	7,503	1,782		442	59,358
Dagenham and Rainham	LND	LND	Lab	Lab	19,468	45.5%	293	61.6%	19,175	19,468	1,182	602	2,887	411	43,725
Darlington	DUR	NE	Lab	Con	20,901	48.1%	3,294	65.5%	20,901	17,607	2,097	1,057	1,544	292	43,498
Dartford	KEN	SE	Con	Con	34,006	62.9%	19,160	65.7%	34,006	14,846	3,735	1,435			54,022
Daventry	NTH	EM	Con	Con	37,055	64.6%	26,080	74.0%	37,055	10,975	7,032	2,341			57,403
Denton and Reddish	GTM	NW	Lab	Lab	19,317	50.1%	6,175	58.3%	13,142	19,317	1,642	1,124	3,039	324	38,588
Derby North	DBY	EM	Lab	Con	21,259	45.2%	2,540	64.2%	21,259	18,719	3,450	1,046	1,908	635	47,017
Derby South	DBY	EM	Lab	Lab	21,690	51.1%	6,019	58.1%	15,671	21,690	2,621		2,480		42,462
Derbyshire Dales	DBY	EM	Con	Con	29,356	58.7%	17,381	76.9%	29,356	11,975	6,627	2,058			50,016
Devizes	WIL	SW	Con	Con	32,150	63.1%	23,993	69.4%	32,150	7,838	8,157	2,809			50,954
Dewsbury	WYK	YTH	Lab	Con	26,179	46.4%	1,561	69.4%	26,179	24,618	2,406	1,060	1,874	252	56,389
Don Valley	SYK	YTH	Lab	Con	19,609	43.2%	3,630	60.3%	19,609	15,979	1,907	872	6,247	823	45,437
Doncaster Central	SYK	YTH	Lab	Lab	16,638	40.0%	2,278	58.2%	14,360	16,638	1,748	981	6,842	1,012	41,581
Doncaster North	SYK	YTH	Lab	Lab	15,740	38.7%	2,370	56.2%	13,370	15,740	1,476		8,294	1,818	40,698
Dover	KEN	SE	Con	Con	28,830	56.9%	12,278	66.4%	28,830	16,552	2,895	1,371		1,053	50,701
Dudley North	WMD	WM	Lab	Con	23,134	63.1%	11,533	59.2%	23,134	11,601	1,210	739			36,684
Dudley South	WMD	WM	Con	Con	24,832	67.9%	15,565	60.2%	24,835	9,270	1,608	863			36,576
Dulwich and West Norwood	LND	LND	Lab	Lab	36,521	65.5%	27,310	65.9%	9,160	36,521		9,211	571	315	55,778
Ealing Central and Acton	LND	LND	Lab	Lab	28,132	51.3%	13,300	72.6%	14,832	28,132	9,444	1,735	664		54,807
Ealing North	LND	LND	Lab	Lab	28,036	56.5%	12,269	66.6%	15,767	28,036	4,370	1,458			49,631
Ealing Southall	LND	LND	Lab	Lab	25,678	60.8%	16,084	65.4%	9,594	25,678	3,933	1,688	867	457	42,217
Easington	DUR	NE	Lab	Lab	15,723	45.5%	6,581	56.5%	9,142	15,723	1,526		6,744	1,448	34,583
East Devon	DEV	SW	Con	Con	32,577	50.8%	6,708	73.6%	32,577	2,870	1,771	711		26,144	64,073
East Ham	LND	LND	Lab	Lab	41,703	76.3%	33,176	60.7%	8,527	41,703	2,158	883	1,107	250	54,628
East Hampshire	HAM	SE	Con	Con	33,446	58.8%	19,696	74.4%	33,446	6,287	13,750	2,600		812	56,895
East Surrey	SRY	SE	Con	Con	35,624	59.7%	24,040	72.1%	35,624	8,247	11,584	2,340		1,895	59,690
East Worthing and Shoreham	WSX	SE	Con	Con	27,104	51.0%	7,441	70.7%	27,104	19,663	4,127	2,006		255	53,155
East Yorkshire	HUM	YTH	Con	Con	33,998	64.4%	22,787	65.3%	33,998	11,201	4,219	1,675		1,686	52,779
Eastbourne	SXE	SE	LD	Con	26,951	48.9%	4,331	69.5%	26,951	3,848	22,620		1,530	185	55,134
Eastleigh	HAM	SE	Con	Con	32,690	55.4%	15,607	70.3%	32,690	7,559	17,083	1,639			58,971
Eddisbury	CHS	NW	Con	Con	30,095	56.8%	18,443	71.9%	30,095	11,652	9,582	1,191		451	52,971
Edmonton	LND	LND	Lab	Lab	26,217	65.0%	16,015	61.5%	10,202	26,217	2,145	862	840	75	40,341
Ellesmere Port and Neston	CHS	NW	Lab	Lab	26,001	53.3%	8,764	69.3%	17,237	26,001	2,406	964	2,138		48,746
Elmet and Rothwell	WYK	YTH	Con	Con	33,726	57.9%	17,353	71.9%	33,726	16,373	5,155	1,775		1,196	58,225
Eltham	LND	LND	Lab	Lab	20,550	47.0%	3,197	68.2%	17,353	20,550	2,941	1,322	1,523		43,689
Enfield North	LND	LND	Lab	Lab	23,340	51.8%	6,492	66.0%	16,848	23,340	2,950	1,115	797		45,050
Enfield Southgate	LND	LND	Lab	Lab	22,923	48.5%	4,450	72.1%	18,473	22,923	4,344	1,042	494		47,276
Epping Forest	ESS	E	Con	Con	32,364	64.4%	22,173	67.7%	32,364	10,191	5,387	1,975		351	50,268
Epsom and Ewell	SRY	SE	Con	Con	31,819	53.5%	17,873	73.3%	31,819	10,226	13,946	2,047		1,413	59,451
Erewash	DBY	EM	Con	Con	27,560	56.5%	10,606	67.3%	27,560	16,954	2,487	1,115		698	48,814
Erith and Thamesmead	LND	LND	Lab	Lab	19,882	48.0%	3,758	63.3%	16,124	19,882	1,984	876	2,246	272	41,384
Esher and Walton	SRY	SE	Con	Con	31,132	49.4%	2,743	77.7%	31,132	2,838	28,389			725	63,084
Exeter	DEV	SW	Lab	Lab	29,882	53.2%	10,403	68.5%	19,479	29,882		4,838	1,428	565	56,192
Fareham	HAM	SE	Con	Con	36,459	63.7%	26,086	73.1%	36,459	10,373	8,006	2,412			57,250
Faversham and Mid Kent	KEN	SE	Con	Con	31,864	63.2%	21,976	68.7%	31,864	9,888	6,170	2,103		369	50,394
Feltham and Heston	LND	LND	Lab	Lab	24,876	52.0%	7,859	59.1%	17,017	24,876	3,127	1,133	1,658		47,811
Filton and Bradley Stoke	AVN	SW	Con	Con	26,293	48.9%	5,646	72.6%	26,293	20,647	4,992	1,563		257	53,752
Finchley and Golders Green	LND	LND	Con	Con	24,162	43.8%	6,562	71.0%	24,162	13,347	17,600				55,109
Folkestone and Hythe	KEN	SE	Con	Con	35,483	60.1%	21,337	66.8%	35,483	14,146	5,755	2,706		915	59,005
Forest of Dean	GLS	SW	Con	Con	30,680	59.6%	15,869	72.1%	30,680	14,811		4,681		1,303	51,475
Fylde	LAN	NW	Con	Con	28,432	60.9%	16,611	69.8%	28,432	11,821	3,748	1,731		927	46,659
Gainsborough	LIN	EM	Con	Con	33,893	66.4%	22,967	66.9%	33,893	10,926	5,157			1,070	51,046
Garston and Halewood	MSY	NW	Lab	Lab	38,578	72.3%	31,624	70.1%	6,954	38,578	3,324	1,183	2,943	344	53,326
Gateshead	TWR	NE	Lab	Lab	20,450	53.6%	7,200	59.2%	13,250	20,450	2,792	1,653			38,145
Gedling	NTT	EM	Lab	Con	22,718	45.5%	679	69.9%	22,718	22,039	2,279	1,097	1,820		49,953
Gillingham and Rainham	KEN	SE	Con	Con	28,173	61.3%	15,119	62.5%	28,173	13,054	2,503	1,043		1,185	45,958
Gloucester	GLS	SW	Con	Con	29,159	54.2%	10,277	66.1%	29,159	18,882	4,338	1,385			53,764
Gosport	HAM	SE	Con	Con	32,226	66.5%	23,278	65.9%	32,226	8,948	5,473	1,806			48,453
Grantham and Stamford	LIN	EM	Con	Con	36,794	65.7%	26,003	68.7%	36,794	10,791	6,153	2,265			56,003
Gravesham	KEN	SE	Con	Con	29,580	62.2%	15,581	64.9%	29,580	13,999	2,584	1,397			47,560
Great Grimsby	HUM	YTH	Lab	Con	18,150	54.9%	7,331	53.9%	18,150	10,819	1,070	514	2,378	156	33,087
Great Yarmouth	NFK	E	Con	Con	28,593	65.8%	17,663	60.4%	28,593	10,930	1,661	1,064		1,214	43,462
Greenwich and Woolwich	LND	LND	Lab	Lab	30,185	56.8%	18,464	66.4%	11,721	30,185	7,253	2,363	1,228	370	53,120
Guildford	SRY	SE	Con	Con	26,317	44.9%	3,337	75.5%	26,317	4,515	22,980			4,839	58,651
Hackney North and Stoke Newington	LND	LND	Lab	Lab	39,972	70.3%	33,188	61.5%	6,784	39,972	4,283	4,989	609	227	56,864
Hackney South and Shoreditch	LND	LND	Lab	Lab	39,884	73.3%	33,985	60.9%	5,899	39,884	4,853	2,948	744	111	54,439
Halesowen and Rowley Regis	WMD	WM	Con	Con	25,607	60.5%	12,074	62.0%	25,607	13,533	1,738	934		533	42,345
Halifax	WYK	YTH	Lab	Lab	21,496	46.3%	2,569	64.6%	18,927	21,496	2,276	946	2,813		46,458
Haltemprice and Howden	HUM	YTH	Con	Con	31,045	62.4%	20,329	70.0%	31,045	10,716	5,215	1,764		1,039	49,779
Halton	CHS	NW	Lab	Lab	29,333	63.5%	18,975	64.2%	10,358	29,333	1,800	982	3,730		46,203
Hammersmith	LND	LND	Lab	Lab	30,074	57.9%	17,847	69.5%	12,227	30,074	6,947	1,744	974		51,966
Hampstead and Kilburn	LND	LND	Lab	Lab	28,080	48.9%	14,188	66.3%	13,892	28,080	13,121	1,608	684		57,385
Harborough	LEI	EM	Con	Con	31,698	55.3%	17,278	71.5%	31,698	14,420	9,103	1,709		389	57,319
Harlow	ESS	E	Con	Con	27,510	63.5%	14,063	63.7%	27,510	13,447	2,397				43,354
Harrogate and Knaresborough	NYK	YTH	Con	Con	29,962	52.6%	9,675	73.1%	29,962	5,480	20,287			1,208	56,937
Harrow East	LND	LND	Con	Con	26,935	54.4%	8,170	68.6%	26,935	18,765	3,791				49,491
Harrow West	LND	LND	Lab	Lab	25,132	52.4%	8,692	66.1%	16,440	25,132	4,310	1,109	931		47,922
Hartlepool	CLV	NE	Lab	Lab	15,464	37.7%	3,595	57.9%	11,869	15,464	1,696		10,603	1,405	41,037
Harwich and North Essex	ESS	E	Con	Con	31,830	61.3%	20,182	70.1%	31,830	11,648	5,866	1,945		674	51,963
Hastings and Rye	SXE	SE	Con	Con	26,896	49.6%	4,043	67.4%	26,896	22,853	3,960			565	54,274
Havant	HAM	SE	Con	Con	30,051	65.4%	21,792	63.7%	30,051	8,259	5,708	1,597		344	45,959
Hayes and Harlington	LND	LND	Lab	Lab	24,545	55.8%	9,261	60.8%	15,284	24,545	1,947	739	1,292	187	43,994
Hazel Grove	GTM	NW	Con	Con	21,592	48.8%	4,423	69.9%	21,592	5,508	17,169				44,269
Hemel Hempstead	HRT	E	Con	Con	28,968	56.5%	14,563	69.5%	28,968	14,405	6,317	1,581			51,271
Hemsworth	WYK	YTH	Lab	Lab	16,460	37.5%	1,180	59.6%	15,280	16,460	1,734	916	5,930	3,587	43,907
Hendon	LND	LND	Con	Con	26,878	48.8%	4,230	66.6%	26,878	22,648	4,628	921			55,075
Henley	OXF	SE	Con	Con	32,189	54.8%	14,053	76.6%	32,189	5,698	18,136	2,736			58,759
Hereford and South Herefordshire	HWR	WM	Con	Con	30,390	61.2%	19,686	68.9%	30,390	10,704	6,181	2,371			49,646
Hertford and Stortford	HRT	E	Con	Con	33,712	56.1%	19,620	72.9%	33,712	14,092	8,596	2,705		989	60,094
Hertsmere	HRT	E	Con	Con	32,651	62.5%	21,313	70.6%	32,651	11,338	6,561	1,653			52,203
Hexham	NBL	NE	Con	Con	25,152	54.5%	10,549	75.3%	25,152	14,603	4,672	1,723			46,150
Heywood and Middleton	GTM	NW	Lab	Con	20,453	43.1%	663	59.2%	20,453	19,790	2,073	1,220	3,952		47,488
High Peak	DBY	EM	Lab	Con	24,844	45.9%	590	72.9%	24,844	24,254	2,750	1,148	1,177		54,173
Hitchin and Harpenden	HRT	E	Con	Con	27,719	47.1%	6,895	77.1%	27,719	9,959	20,824			369	58,871
Holborn and St Pancras	LND	LND	Lab	Lab	36,641	64.5%	27,673	65.1%	8,878	36,641	7,314	2,746	1,032	175	56,786
Hornchurch and Upminster	LND	LND	Con	Con	35,495	65.8%	23,308	66.8%	35,495	12,187	3,862	1,920		510	53,974
Hornsey and Wood Green	LND	LND	Lab	Lab	35,126	57.5%	19,242	74.7%	6,829	35,126	15,884	2,192	763	311	61,105
Horsham	WSX	SE	Con	Con	35,900	56.8%	21,127	72.9%	35,900	9,424	14,773	2,668		437	63,202
Houghton and Sunderland South	TWR	NE	Lab	Lab	16,210	40.7%	3,115	57.8%	13,095	16,210	2,319	1,125	6,165	897	39,811
Hove	SXE	SE	Lab	Lab	32,876	58.3%	17,044	75.9%	15,832	32,876	3,731	2,496	1,111	345	56,391
Huddersfield	WYK	YTH	Lab	Lab	20,509	49.0%	4,937	63.9%	15,572	20,509	2,367	1,768	1,666		41,882
Huntingdon	CAM	E	Con	Con	32,386	54.8%	19,383	69.9%	32,386	13,003	9,432	2,233		2,093	59,147
Hyndburn	LAN	NW	Lab	Con	20,565	48.5%	2,951	59.8%	20,565	17,614	1,226	845	2,156		42,406
Ilford North	LND	LND	Lab	Lab	25,323	50.5%	5,218	68.7%	20,125	25,323	2,680	845	960	201	50,134
Ilford South	LND	LND	Lab	Lab	35,085	65.6%	24,101	62.9%	10,984	35,085	1,795	714	1,008	3,891	53,477
Ipswich	SFK	E	Lab	Con	24,952	50.3%	5,479	65.6%	24,952	19,473	2,439	1,283	1,432		49,579
Isle of Wight	IOW	SE	Con	Con	41,815	56.2%	23,737	65.9%	41,815	18,078		11,338		3,211	74,442
Islington North	LND	LND	Lab	Lab	34,603	64.3%	26,188	71.6%	5,483	34,603	8,415	4,326	742	236	53,805
Islington South and Finsbury	LND	LND	Lab	Lab	26,897	56.3%	17,328	67.8%	8,045	26,897	9,569	1,987	1,136	182	47,816
Jarrow	TWR	NE	Lab	Lab	18,363	45.1%	7,120	62.6%	11,243	18,363	2,360	831	4,122	3,817	40,736
Keighley	WYK	YTH	Lab	Con	25,298	48.1%	2,218	72.3%	25,298	23,080	2,573		850	799	52,600
Kenilworth and Southam	WAR	WM	Con	Con	30,351	57.7%	20,353	77.2%	30,351	9,440	9,998	2,351		457	52,597
Kensington	LND	LND	Lab	Con	16,768	38.3%	150	67.7%	16,768	16,618	9,312	535	384	145	43,762
Kettering	NTH	EM	Con	Con	29,787	60.3%	16,765	67.5%	29,787	13,022	3,367	1,543		1,642	49,361
Kingston and Surbiton	LND	LND	LD	LD	31,103	51.1%	16,698	74.2%	20,614	6,528	31,103	1,038	788	775	60,846
Kingston upon Hull East	HUM	YTH	Lab	Lab	12,713	39.2%	1,239	49.3%	11,474	12,713	1,707	784	5,764		32,442
Kingston upon Hull North	HUM	YTH	Lab	Lab	17,033	49.8%	7,593	52.2%	9,440	17,033	2,084	875	4,771		34,203
Kingston upon Hull West and Hessle	HUM	YTH	Lab	Lab	13,384	42.7%	2,856	52.1%	10,528	13,384	1,756	560	5,638		31,866
Kingswood	AVN	SW	Con	Con	27,712	56.2%	11,220	71.5%	27,712	16,492	3,421	1,200		489	49,314
Knowsley	MSY	NW	Lab	Lab	44,374	80.8%	39,942	65.3%	4,432	44,374	1,117	1,262	3,348	405	54,938
Lancaster and Fleetwood	LAN	NW	Lab	Lab	21,184	46.8%	2,380	64.5%	18,804	21,184	2,018	1,396	1,817		45,219
Leeds Central	WYK	YTH	Lab	Lab	30,413	61.7%	19,270	54.2%	11,143	30,413	2,343	2,105	2,999	281	49,284
Leeds East	WYK	YTH	Lab	Lab	19,464	49.8%	5,531	58.0%	13,933	19,464	1,796	878	2,981		39,052
Leeds North East	WYK	YTH	Lab	Lab	29,024	57.5%	17,089	71.6%	11,935	29,024	5,665	1,931	1,769	176	50,500
Leeds North West	WYK	YTH	Lab	Lab	23,971	48.6%	10,749	72.8%	13,222	23,971	9,397	1,389	1,304		49,283
Leeds West	WYK	YTH	Lab	Lab	22,186	55.1%	10,564	59.5%	11,622	22,186	1,787	1,274	2,685	727	40,281
Leicester East	LEI	EM	Lab	Lab	25,090	50.8%	6,019	63.0%	19,071	25,090	2,800	888	1,243	329	49,421
Leicester South	LEI	EM	Lab	Lab	33,606	67.0%	22,675	64.5%	10,931	33,606	2,754	1,669	1,187		50,147
Leicester West	LEI	EM	Lab	Lab	17,291	49.7%	4,212	53.5%	13,079	17,291	1,808	977	1,620		34,775
Leigh	GTM	NW	Lab	Con	21,266	45.3%	1,965	60.7%	21,266	19,301	2,252		3,161	999	46,979
Lewes	SXE	SE	Con	Con	26,268	47.9%	2,457	76.7%	26,268	3,206	23,811	1,453		113	54,851
Lewisham Deptford	LND	LND	Lab	Lab	39,216	70.8%	32,913	68.7%	6,303	39,216	5,774	3,085	789	201	55,368
Lewisham East	LND	LND	Lab	Lab	26,661	59.5%	17,008	66.0%	9,653	26,661	5,039	1,706	1,234	522	44,815
Lewisham West and Penge	LND	LND	Lab	Lab	31,860	61.2%	21,543	69.8%	10,317	31,860	6,260	2,390	1,060	213	52,100
Leyton and Wanstead	LND	LND	Lab	Lab	28,836	64.7%	20,808	68.7%	8,028	28,836	4,666	1,805	785	427	44,547
Lichfield	STS	WM	Con	Con	34,844	64.5%	23,638	70.5%	34,844	11,206	5,632	1,743		568	53,993
Lincoln	LIN	EM	Lab	Con	24,267	47.9%	3,514	67.6%	24,267	20,753	2,422	1,195	1,079	913	50,629
Liverpool Riverside	MSY	NW	Lab	Lab	41,170	78.0%	37,043	65.7%	4,127	41,170	2,696	3,017	1,779		52,789
Liverpool Walton	MSY	NW	Lab	Lab	34,538	84.7%	30,520	65.1%	4,018	34,538	756	814		660	40,786
Liverpool Wavertree	MSY	NW	Lab	Lab	31,310	72.2%	27,085	68.4%	4,225	31,310	4,055	1,365	1,921	501	43,377
Liverpool West Derby	MSY	NW	Lab	Lab	34,117	77.6%	29,984	67.0%	4,133	34,117	1,296	605	2,012	1,826	43,989
Loughborough	LEI	EM	Con	Con	27,954	51.2%	7,169	68.5%	27,954	20,785	4,153	1,504		235	54,631
Louth and Horncastle	LIN	EM	Con	Con	38,021	72.7%	28,868	65.7%	38,021	9,153	4,114			1,044	52,332
Ludlow	SAL	WM	Con	Con	32,185	64.1%	23,648	72.3%	32,185	7,591	8,537	1,912			50,225
Luton North	BDF	E	Lab	Lab	23,496	55.2%	9,247	62.5%	14,249	23,496	2,063	771	1,215	795	42,589
Luton South	BDF	E	Lab	Lab	21,787	51.8%	8,756	60.7%	13,031	21,787		995	1,601	4,650	42,064
Macclesfield	CHS	NW	Con	Con	28,292	52.5%	10,711	70.7%	28,292	17,581	5,684	2,310			53,867
Maidenhead	BRK	SE	Con	Con	32,620	57.7%	18,846	73.7%	32,620	7,882	13,774	2,216			56,492
Maidstone and The Weald	KEN	SE	Con	Con	31,220	60.4%	21,771	67.9%	31,220	9,448	8,482	2,172		358	51,680
Makerfield	GTM	NW	Lab	Lab	19,954	45.1%	4,740	59.7%	15,214	19,954	2,108	1,166	5,817		44,259
Maldon	ESS	E	Con	Con	36,304	72.0%	30,041	69.6%	36,304	6,263	5,990	1,851			50,408
Manchester Central	GTM	NW	Lab	Lab	36,823	70.4%	29,089	56.7%	7,734	36,823	3,420	1,870	2,335	107	52,289
Manchester Gorton	GTM	NW	Lab	Lab	34,583	77.6%	30,339	58.3%	4,244	34,583	2,448	1,697	1,573		44,545
Manchester Withington	GTM	NW	Lab	Lab	35,902	67.7%	27,905	69.2%	5,820	35,902	7,997	1,968	1,308		52,995
Mansfield	NTT	EM	Con	Con	31,484	63.9%	16,306	63.9%	31,484	15,178	1,626			985	49,273
Meon Valley	HAM	SE	Con	Con	35,271	63.5%	23,555	73.4%	35,271	5,644	11,716	2,198			54,829
Meriden	WMD	WM	Con	Con	34,358	63.4%	22,836	63.4%	34,358	11,522	5,614	2,667			54,161
Mid Bedfordshire	BDF	E	Con	Con	38,692	59.8%	24,664	73.7%	38,692	14,028	8,171	2,478		1,348	64,717
Mid Derbyshire	DBY	EM	Con	Con	29,027	58.8%	15,385	73.2%	29,027	13,642	4,756	1,931			49,356
Mid Dorset and North Poole	DOR	SW	Con	Con	29,548	60.4%	14,898	74.8%	29,548	3,402	14,650	1,330			48,930
Mid Norfolk	NFK	E	Con	Con	35,051	62.4%	22,594	68.4%	35,051	12,457	7,739			939	56,186
Mid Sussex	WSX	SE	Con	Con	33,455	53.3%	18,197	73.7%	33,455	11,218	15,258	2,234		597	62,762
Mid Worcestershire	HWR	WM	Con	Con	37,426	66.7%	28,108	71.8%	37,426	9,408	6,474	2,177		638	56,123
Middlesbrough	CLV	NE	Lab	Lab	17,207	50.5%	8,395	56.1%	8,812	17,207	816	546	2,168	4,548	34,097
Middlesbrough South and East Cleveland	CLV	NE	Con	Con	28,135	58.8%	11,626	66.1%	28,135	16,509	1,953	1,220			47,817
Milton Keynes North	BKM	SE	Con	Con	30,938	49.5%	6,255	68.3%	30,938	24,683	4,991	1,931			62,543
Milton Keynes South	BKM	SE	Con	Con	32,011	50.0%	6,944	66.4%	32,011	25,067	4,688	1,495		746	64,007
Mitcham and Morden	LND	LND	Lab	Lab	27,964	61.1%	16,482	65.3%	11,482	27,964	3,717	1,160	1,202	216	45,741
Mole Valley	SRY	SE	Con	Con	31,656	55.4%	12,041	76.5%	31,656	2,965	19,615	1,874		1000	57,110
Morecambe and Lunesdale	LAN	NW	Con	Con	23,925	52.8%	6,354	67.2%	23,925	17,571	2,328	938		548	45,310
Morley and Outwood	WYK	YTH	Con	Con	29,424	56.7%	11,267	65.9%	29,424	18,157	2,285	1,107		957	51,930
New Forest East	HAM	SE	Con	Con	32,769	64.5%	25,251	69.1%	32,769	7,518	7,390	2,434		675	50,786
New Forest West	HAM	SE	Con	Con	32,113	63.8%	24,403	71.0%	32,113	6,595	7,710	3,888			50,306
Newark	NTT	EM	Con	Con	34,660	63.3%	21,816	72.2%	34,660	12,844	5,308	1,950			54,762
Newbury	BRK	SE	Con	Con	34,431	57.4%	16,047	71.9%	34,431	4,404	18,384	2,454		325	59,998
Newcastle upon Tyne Central	TWR	NE	Lab	Lab	21,568	57.6%	12,278	64.8%	9,290	21,568	2,709	1,365	2,542		37,474
Newcastle upon Tyne East	TWR	NE	Lab	Lab	26,049	60.1%	15,463	68.0%	10,586	26,049	4,535	2,195			43,365
Newcastle upon Tyne North	TWR	NE	Lab	Lab	21,354	45.4%	5,765	68.6%	15,589	21,354	4,357	1,368	4,331		46,999
Newcastle-under-Lyme	STS	WM	Lab	Con	23,485	52.5%	7,446	65.6%	23,485	16,039	2,361	933	1,921		44,739
Newton Abbot	DEV	SW	Con	Con	29,190	55.5%	17,501	72.5%	29,190	9,329	11,689	1,508		840	52,556
Normanton, Pontefract and Castleford	WYK	YTH	Lab	Lab	18,297	37.9%	1,276	57.1%	17,021	18,297	3,147		8,032	1,762	48,259
North Cornwall	CUL	SW	Con	Con	30,671	59.4%	14,752	73.9%	30,671	4,516	15,919			572	51,678
North Devon	DEV	SW	Con	Con	31,479	56.6%	14,813	73.3%	31,479	5,097	16,666	1,759		580	55,581
North Dorset	DOR	SW	Con	Con	35,705	63.6%	24,301	73.1%	35,705	6,737	11,404	2,261			56,107
North Durham	DUR	NE	Lab	Lab	18,639	44.2%	4,742	63.2%	13,897	18,639	2,879	1,126	4,693	961	42,195
North East Bedfordshire	BDF	E	Con	Con	38,443	59.1%	24,283	71.7%	38,443	14,160	7,999	1,891		2,525	65,018
North East Cambridgeshire	CAM	E	Con	Con	38,423	72.5%	29,993	63.3%	38,423	8,430	4,298	1,813			52,964
North East Derbyshire	DBY	EM	Con	Con	28,897	58.7%	12,876	68.0%	28,897	16,021	3,021	1,278			49,217
North East Hampshire	HAM	SE	Con	Con	35,280	59.5%	20,211	75.1%	35,280	5,760	15,069	1,754		1,407	59,270
North East Hertfordshire	HRT	E	Con	Con	31,293	56.6%	18,189	72.7%	31,293	13,104	8,563	2,367			55,327
North East Somerset	AVN	SW	Con	Con	28,360	50.4%	14,729	76.4%	28,360	13,631	12,422	1,423		472	56,308
North Herefordshire	HWR	WM	Con	Con	32,158	63.0%	24,856	72.6%	32,158	6,804	7,302	4,769			51,033
North Norfolk	NFK	E	LD	Con	29,792	58.6%	14,395	71.9%	29,792	3,895	15,397		1,739		50,823
North Shropshire	SAL	WM	Con	Con	35,444	62.7%	22,949	67.9%	35,444	12,495	5,643	1,790		1,141	56,513
North Somerset	AVN	SW	Con	Con	32,801	52.9%	17,536	77.4%	32,801	15,265	11,051	2,938			62,055
North Swindon	WIL	SW	Con	Con	32,584	59.1%	16,171	66.9%	32,584	16,413	4,408	1,710			55,115
North Thanet	KEN	SE	Con	Con	30,066	62.4%	17,189	66.2%	30,066	12,877	3,439	1,796			48,178
North Tyneside	TWR	NE	Lab	Lab	25,051	49.7%	9,561	63.9%	15,490	25,051	3,241	1,393	5,254		50,429
North Warwickshire	WAR	WM	Con	Con	30,249	65.9%	17,956	65.3%	30,249	12,293	2,069	1,303			45,914
North West Cambridgeshire	CAM	E	Con	Con	40,307	62.5%	25,983	68.0%	40,307	14,324	6,881	3,021			64,533
North West Durham	DUR	NE	Lab	Con	19,990	41.9%	1,144	66.0%	19,990	18,846	2,831	1,173	3,193	1,630	47,663
North West Hampshire	HAM	SE	Con	Con	36,591	62.1%	26,308	70.9%	36,591	9,327	10,283	2,717			58,918
North West Leicestershire	LEI	EM	Con	Con	33,811	62.8%	20,400	68.2%	33,811	13,411	3,614	2,478		507	53,821
North West Norfolk	NFK	E	Con	Con	30,627	65.7%	19,922	64.7%	30,627	10,705	3,625	1,645			46,602
North Wiltshire	WIL	SW	Con	Con	32,373	59.1%	17,626	74.7%	32,373	5,699	14,747	1,939			54,758
Northampton North	NTH	EM	Con	Con	21,031	53.2%	5,507	67.3%	21,031	15,524	2,031	953			39,539
Northampton South	NTH	EM	Con	Con	20,914	51.2%	4,697	65.7%	20,914	16,217	2,482	1,222			40,835
Norwich North	NFK	E	Con	Con	23,397	50.5%	4,738	68.9%	23,397	18,659	2,663	1,078		488	46,285
Norwich South	NFK	E	Lab	Lab	27,766	53.7%	12,760	66.4%	15,006	27,766	4,776	2,469	1,656		51,673
Nottingham East	NTT	EM	Lab	Lab	25,735	64.3%	17,393	60.4%	8,342	25,735	1,954	1,183	1,343	1,447	40,004
Nottingham North	NTT	EM	Lab	Lab	17,337	49.1%	4,490	53.1%	12,847	17,337	1,582	868	2,686		35,320
Nottingham South	NTT	EM	Lab	Lab	26,586	55.2%	12,568	60.6%	14,018	26,586	3,935	1,583	2,012		48,134
Nuneaton	WAR	WM	Con	Con	27,390	60.6%	13,144	64.3%	27,390	14,246	1,862	1,692			45,190
Old Bexley and Sidcup	LND	LND	Con	Con	29,786	64.5%	18,952	69.8%	29,786	10,834	3,822	1,477		226	46,145
Oldham East and Saddleworth	GTM	NW	Lab	Lab	20,088	43.5%	1,499	64.0%	18,589	20,088	2,423	778	2,980	1,306	46,164
Oldham West and Royton	GTM	NW	Lab	Lab	24,579	55.3%	11,127	60.9%	13,452	24,579	1,484	681	3,316	922	44,434
Orpington	LND	LND	Con	Con	30,882	63.4%	22,378	70.7%	30,882	8,504	7,552	1,783			48,721
Oxford East	OXF	SE	Lab	Lab	28,135	57.0%	17,832	63.0%	10,303	28,135	6,884	2,392	1,146	499	49,359
Oxford West and Abingdon	OXF	SE	LD	LD	31,340	53.3%	8,943	76.4%	22,397	4,258	31,340		829		58,824
Pendle	LAN	NW	Con	Con	24,076	54.2%	6,186	68.1%	24,076	17,890	1,548	678		268	44,460
Penistone and Stocksbridge	SYK	YTH	Lab	Con	23,688	47.8%	7,210	69.8%	23,688	16,478	5,054		4,300		49,520
Penrith and The Border	CMA	NW	Con	Con	28,875	60.4%	18,519	70.8%	28,875	10,356	5,364	2,159		1,070	47,824
Peterborough	CAM	E	Lab	Con	22,334	46.7%	2,580	65.9%	22,334	19,754	2,334	728	2,127	524	47,801
Plymouth Moor View	DEV	SW	Con	Con	26,831	60.7%	12,897	63.7%	26,831	13,934	2,301	1,173			44,239
Plymouth Sutton and Devonport	DEV	SW	Lab	Lab	25,461	47.9%	4,757	68.3%	20,704	25,461	2,545	1,557	2,909		53,176
Poole	DOR	SW	Con	Con	29,599	58.7%	19,116	68.2%	29,599	10,483	7,819	1,702		848	50,451
Poplar and Limehouse	LND	LND	Lab	Lab	38,660	63.1%	28,904	66.7%	9,756	38,660	8,832	2,159	1,493	376	61,276
Portsmouth North	HAM	SE	Con	Con	28,172	61.4%	15,780	64.4%	28,172	12,392	3,419	1,304		623	45,910
Portsmouth South	HAM	SE	Lab	Lab	23,068	48.6%	5,363	63.9%	17,705	23,068	5,418		994	240	47,425
Preston	LAN	NW	Lab	Lab	20,870	61.8%	12,146	56.6%	8,724	20,870	1,737	660	1,799		33,790
Pudsey	WYK	YTH	Con	Con	26,453	48.8%	3,517	74.1%	26,453	22,936	3,088	894		844	54,215
Putney	LND	LND	Con	Lab	22,780	45.1%	4,774	77.0%	18,006	22,780	8,548	1,133			50,467
Rayleigh and Wickford	ESS	E	Con	Con	39,864	72.6%	31,000	69.5%	39,864	8,864	4,171	2,002			54,901
Reading East	BRK	SE	Lab	Lab	27,102	48.5%	5,924	72.2%	21,178	27,102	5,035	1,549	852	202	55,918
Reading West	BRK	SE	Con	Con	24,393	48.4%	4,117	67.9%	24,393	20,276	4,460	1,263			50,392
Redcar	CLV	NE	Lab	Con	18,811	46.1%	3,527	62.0%	18,811	15,284	2,018	491	2,915	1,323	40,842
Redditch	HWR	WM	Con	Con	27,907	63.3%	16,036	67.4%	27,907	11,871	2,905	1,384			44,067
Reigate	SRY	SE	Con	Con	28,665	53.9%	18,310	71.0%	28,665	10,355	10,320	3,169		647	53,156
Ribble Valley	LAN	NW	Con	Con	33,346	60.3%	18,439	69.8%	33,346	14,907	4,776	1,704		551	55,284
Richmond (Yorks)	NYK	YTH	Con	Con	36,693	63.6%	27,210	69.9%	36,693	9,483	6,989	2,500		2,038	57,703
Richmond Park	LND	LND	Con	LD	34,559	53.1%	7,766	78.7%	26,793	3,407	34,559			308	65,067
Rochdale	GTM	NW	Lab	Lab	24,475	51.6%	9,668	60.1%	14,807	24,475	3,312	986	3,867		47,447
Rochester and Strood	KEN	SE	Con	Con	31,151	60.0%	17,072	63.3%	31,151	14,079	3,717	1,312		1,667	51,926
Rochford and Southend East	ESS	E	Con	Con	27,063	58.7%	12,286	61.2%	27,063	14,777	2,822			1,474	46,136
Romford	LND	LND	Con	Con	30,494	64.6%	17,893	65.3%	30,494	12,601	2,708	1,428			47,231
Romsey and Southampton North	HAM	SE	Con	Con	27,862	54.2%	10,872	75.3%	27,862	5,898	16,990			640	51,390
Rossendale and Darwen	LAN	NW	Con	Con	27,570	56.5%	9,522	67.1%	27,570	18,048	2,011	1,193			48,822
Rother Valley	SYK	YTH	Lab	Con	21,970	45.1%	6,318	65.1%	21,970	15,652	2,553	1,219	6,264	1,040	48,698
Rotherham	SYK	YTH	Lab	Lab	14,736	41.3%	3,121	57.8%	11,615	14,736	2,090		6,125	1,085	35,651
Rugby	WAR	WM	Con	Con	29,255	57.6%	13,447	70.2%	29,255	15,808	4,207	1,544			50,814
Ruislip, Northwood and Pinner	LND	LND	Con	Con	29,391	55.6%	16,394	72.1%	29,391	12,997	7,986	1,646		884	52,904
Runnymede and Weybridge	SRY	SE	Con	Con	29,262	54.9%	18,270	69.0%	29,262	10,992	9,236	1,876		1,923	53,289
Rushcliffe	NTT	EM	Con	Con	28,765	47.5%	7,643	78.5%	28,765	21,122	9,600			1,018	60,505
Rutland and Melton	LEI	EM	Con	Con	36,507	62.6%	26,924	70.5%	36,507	9,583	7,970	2,875		1,375	58,310
Saffron Walden	ESS	E	Con	Con	39,714	63.0%	27,594	72.5%	39,714	8,305	12,120	2,947			63,086
Salford and Eccles	GTM	NW	Lab	Lab	28,755	56.8%	16,327	61.6%	12,428	28,755	3,099	2,060	4,290		50,632
Salisbury	WIL	SW	Con	Con	30,280	56.4%	19,736	72.1%	30,280	9,675	10,544	2,486		745	53,730
Scarborough and Whitby	NYK	YTH	Con	Con	27,593	55.5%	10,270	66.8%	27,593	17,323	3,038			1,770	49,724
Scunthorpe	HUM	YTH	Lab	Con	20,306	53.8%	6,451	60.9%	20,306	13,855	875	670	2,044		37,750
Sedgefield	DUR	NE	Lab	Con	19,609	47.2%	4,513	64.6%	19,609	15,096	1,955	994	3,518	394	41,566
Sefton Central	MSY	NW	Lab	Lab	29,254	57.5%	15,122	72.9%	14,132	29,254	3,386	1,261	2,425	422	50,880
Selby and Ainsty	NYK	YTH	Con	Con	33,995	60.3%	20,137	71.7%	33,995	13,858	4,842	1,823		1,900	56,418
Sevenoaks	KEN	SE	Con	Con	30,932	60.7%	20,818	71.0%	30,932	6,946	10,114	1,974		990	50,956
Sheffield Brightside and Hillsborough	SYK	YTH	Lab	Lab	22,369	56.5%	12,274	57.1%	10,095	22,369	1,517	1,179	3,855	585	39,600
Sheffield Central	SYK	YTH	Lab	Lab	33,968	66.7%	27,273	56.7%	6,695	33,968	3,237	4,570	1,969	474	50,913
Sheffield Hallam	SYK	YTH	Lab	Lab	19,709	34.6%	712	78.2%	14,696	19,709	18,997	1,630	1,562	291	56,885
Sheffield Heeley	SYK	YTH	Lab	Lab	21,475	50.3%	8,520	63.8%	12,955	21,475	2,916	1,811	3,538		42,695
Sheffield South East	SYK	YTH	Lab	Lab	19,359	46.1%	4,289	61.9%	15,070	19,359	2,125		4,478	966	41,998
Sherwood	NTT	EM	Con	Con	32,049	60.8%	16,186	67.6%	32,049	15,863	2,883	1,214		700	52,709
Shipley	WYK	YTH	Con	Con	27,437	50.8%	6,242	72.9%	27,437	21,195	3,188	1,301		803	53,924
Shrewsbury and Atcham	SAL	WM	Con	Con	31,021	52.5%	11,217	71.8%	31,021	19,804	5,906	1,762		572	59,065
Sittingbourne and Sheppey	KEN	SE	Con	Con	34,742	67.6%	24,479	61.2%	34,742	10,263	3,213	1,188		1,988	51,394
Skipton and Ripon	NYK	YTH	Con	Con	34,919	59.5%	19,985	74.4%	34,919	11,225	8,701	2,748		1,131	58,724
Sleaford and North Hykeham	LIN	EM	Con	Con	44,683	67.1%	32,565	70.2%	44,683	12,118	5,355	1,742		2,656	66,554
Slough	BRK	SE	Lab	Lab	29,421	57.6%	13,640	58.1%	15,781	29,421	3,357	1,047	1,432		51,038
Solihull	WMD	WM	Con	Con	32,309	58.4%	21,273	70.3%	32,309	11,036	9,977	2,022			55,344
Somerton and Frome	SOM	SW	Con	Con	36,230	55.8%	19,213	75.6%	36,230	8,354	17,017	3,295			64,896
South Basildon and East Thurrock	ESS	E	Con	Con	29,973	66.2%	19,922	60.8%	29,973	10,051	1,957			3,316	45,297
South Cambridgeshire	CAM	E	Con	Con	31,015	46.3%	2,904	76.7%	31,015	7,803	28,111				66,929
South Derbyshire	DBY	EM	Con	Con	33,502	62.8%	19,335	67.3%	33,502	14,167	3,924	1,788			53,381
South Dorset	DOR	SW	Con	Con	30,024	58.8%	17,153	69.4%	30,024	12,871	5,432	2,246		485	51,058
South East Cambridgeshire	CAM	E	Con	Con	32,187	50.0%	11,490	74.2%	32,187	10,492	20,697			1,009	64,385
South East Cornwall	CUL	SW	Con	Con	31,807	59.3%	20,971	74.7%	31,807	10,836	8,650	1,493		869	53,655
South Holland and The Deepings	LIN	EM	Con	Con	37,338	75.9%	30,838	64.7%	37,338	6,500	3,225	1,613		503	49,179
South Leicestershire	LEI	EM	Con	Con	36,791	64.0%	24,004	71.4%	36,791	12,787	5,452	2,439			57,469
South Norfolk	NFK	E	Con	Con	36,258	58.0%	21,275	72.5%	36,258	14,983	8,744	2,499			62,484
South Northamptonshire	NTH	EM	Con	Con	41,755	62.4%	27,761	73.7%	41,755	13,994	7,891	2,634		634	66,908
South Ribble	LAN	NW	Con	Con	30,028	55.8%	11,199	71.4%	30,028	18,829	3,720	1,207			53,784
South Shields	TWR	NE	Lab	Lab	17,273	45.6%	9,585	60.3%	7,688	17,273	1,514	1,303	6,446	3,658	37,882
South Staffordshire	STS	WM	Con	Con	36,520	73.0%	28,250	67.9%	36,520	8,270	3,280	1,935			50,005
South Suffolk	SFK	E	Con	Con	33,270	62.2%	22,897	70.2%	33,270	10,373	6,702	3,144			53,489
South Swindon	WIL	SW	Con	Con	26,536	52.3%	6,625	70.0%	26,536	19,911	4,299				50,746
South Thanet	KEN	SE	Con	Con	27,084	56.1%	10,587	65.8%	27,084	16,497	2,727	1,949			48,257
South West Bedfordshire	BDF	E	Con	Con	32,212	60.4%	18,583	66.7%	32,212	13,629	5,435	2,031			53,307
South West Devon	DEV	SW	Con	Con	33,286	62.4%	21,430	73.6%	33,286	11,856	6,207	2,018			53,367
South West Hertfordshire	HRT	E	Con	Con	30,327	49.6%	14,408	76.1%	30,327	7,228	6,251	1,466		15,919	61,191
South West Norfolk	NFK	E	Con	Con	35,507	69.0%	26,195	65.6%	35,507	9,312	4,166	1,645		836	51,466
South West Surrey	SRY	SE	Con	Con	32,191	53.3%	8,817	76.3%	32,191	4,775	23,374				60,340
South West Wiltshire	WIL	SW	Con	Con	33,038	60.2%	21,630	70.4%	33,038	11,408	8,015	2,434			54,895
Southampton Itchen	HAM	SE	Con	Con	23,952	50.5%	4,498	65.6%	23,952	19,454	2,503	1,040		472	47,421
Southampton Test	HAM	SE	Lab	Lab	22,256	49.5%	6,213	64.2%	16,043	22,256	3,449	1,433	1,591	222	44,994
Southend West	ESS	E	Con	Con	27,555	59.2%	14,459	67.8%	27,555	13,096	5,312			574	46,537
Southport	MSY	NW	Con	Con	22,914	47.6%	4,147	71.6%	22,914	18,767	6,499				48,180
Spelthorne	SRY	SE	Con	Con	29,141	58.9%	18,393	69.8%	29,141	10,748	7,499	2,122			49,510
St Albans	HRT	E	Con	LD	28,867	50.1%	6,293	78.1%	22,574	5,000	28,867	1,004		154	57,599
St Austell and Newquay	CUL	SW	Con	Con	31,273	56.1%	16,526	69.8%	31,273	14,747	5,861	1,609		2,286	55,776
St Helens North	MSY	NW	Lab	Lab	24,870	52.3%	12,209	62.9%	12,661	24,870	2,668	1,966	5,396		47,561
St Helens South and Whiston	MSY	NW	Lab	Lab	29,457	59.0%	19,122	63.6%	10,335	29,457	2,886	2,282	5,353		50,313
St Ives	CUL	SW	Con	Con	25,365	49.3%	4,280	74.7%	25,365	3,553	21,085	954		446	51,399
Stafford	STS	WM	Con	Con	29,992	58.6%	14,377	70.5%	29,992	15,615	3,175	2,367			51,149
Staffordshire Moorlands	STS	WM	Con	Con	28,192	64.6%	16,428	66.7%	28,192	11,764	2,469	1,231			43,656
Stalybridge and Hyde	GTM	NW	Lab	Lab	19,025	44.7%	2,946	58.2%	16,079	19,025	1,827	1,411	3,591	435	42,368
Stevenage	HRT	E	Con	Con	25,328	53.1%	8,562	66.6%	25,328	16,766	4,132	1,457			47,683
Stockport	GTM	NW	Lab	Lab	21,695	52.0%	10,039	64.1%	11,656	21,695	5,043	1,403	1,918		41,715
Stockton North	CLV	NE	Lab	Lab	17,728	43.1%	1,027	61.7%	16,701	17,728	1,631		3,907	1,189	41,156
Stockton South	CLV	NE	Lab	Con	27,764	50.7%	5,260	71.3%	27,764	22,504	2,338		2,196		54,802
Stoke-on-Trent Central	STS	WM	Lab	Con	14,557	45.4%	670	57.9%	14,557	13,887	1,116	819	1,691		32,070
Stoke-on-Trent North	STS	WM	Lab	Con	20,974	52.3%	6,286	57.5%	20,974	14,688	1,268	508	2,374	322	40,134
Stoke-on-Trent South	STS	WM	Con	Con	24,632	62.2%	11,271	61.4%	24,632	13,361	1,611				39,604
Stone	STS	WM	Con	Con	31,687	63.6%	19,945	71.8%	31,687	11,742	4,412	2,002			49,843
Stourbridge	WMD	WM	Con	Con	27,534	60.3%	13,571	65.4%	27,534	13,963	2,523	1,048		621	45,689
Stratford-on-Avon	WAR	WM	Con	Con	33,343	60.6%	19,972	74.4%	33,343	6,222	13,371	2,112			55,048
Streatham	LND	LND	Lab	Lab	30,976	54.8%	17,690	68.9%	9,060	30,976	13,286	2,567	624		56,513
Stretford and Urmston	GTM	NW	Lab	Lab	30,195	60.3%	16,417	69.4%	13,778	30,195	2,969	1,357	1,768		50,067
Stroud	GLS	SW	Lab	Con	31,582	47.9%	3,840	78.2%	31,582	27,742		4,954	1,085	567	65,930
Suffolk Coastal	SFK	E	Con	Con	32,958	56.5%	20,533	71.2%	32,958	12,425	8,719	2,713		1,493	58,308
Sunderland Central	TWR	NE	Lab	Lab	18,336	42.2%	2,964	59.8%	15,372	18,336	3,025	1,212	5,047	484	43,476
Surrey Heath	SRY	SE	Con	Con	34,358	58.6%	18,349	72.1%	34,358	5,407	16,009	2,252		628	58,654
Sutton and Cheam	LND	LND	Con	Con	25,235	50.0%	8,351	70.4%	25,235	7,200	16,884	1,168			50,487
Sutton Coldfield	WMD	WM	Con	Con	31,604	60.4%	19,272	69.2%	31,604	12,332	6,358	2,031			52,325
Tamworth	STS	WM	Con	Con	30,542	66.3%	19,634	64.3%	30,542	10,908	2,426	935		1,245	46,056
Tatton	CHS	NW	Con	Con	28,277	57.7%	17,387	70.9%	28,277	10,890	7,712	2,088			48,967
Taunton Deane	SOM	SW	Con	Con	34,164	53.6%	11,700	71.9%	34,164	4,715	22,464			2,390	63,733
Telford	SAL	WM	Con	Con	25,546	59.7%	10,941	62.1%	25,546	14,605	2,674				42,825
Tewkesbury	GLS	SW	Con	Con	35,728	58.4%	22,410	72.8%	35,728	9,310	13,318	2,784			61,140
The Cotswolds	GLS	SW	Con	Con	35,484	58.0%	20,214	74.7%	35,484	7,110	15,270	3,312			61,176
The Wrekin	SAL	WM	Con	Con	31,029	63.5%	18,726	69.2%	31,029	12,303	4,067	1,491			48,890
Thirsk and Malton	NYK	YTH	Con	Con	35,634	63.0%	25,154	69.9%	35,634	10,480	6,774	2,263		1,437	56,588
Thornbury and Yate	AVN	SW	Con	Con	30,202	57.8%	12,369	75.2%	30,202	4,208	17,833				52,243
Thurrock	ESS	E	Con	Con	27,795	58.6%	11,482	59.6%	27,795	16,313	1,510	807		1,042	47,467
Tiverton and Honiton	DEV	SW	Con	Con	35,893	60.2%	24,239	71.9%	35,893	11,654	8,807	2,291		968	59,613
Tonbridge and Malling	KEN	SE	Con	Con	35,784	62.8%	26,941	73.7%	35,784	8,286	8,843	4,090			57,003
Tooting	LND	LND	Lab	Lab	30,811	52.7%	14,307	76.0%	16,504	30,811	8,305	2,314	462	77	58,473
Torbay	DEV	SW	Con	Con	29,863	59.2%	17,749	67.2%	29,863	6,562	12,114	1,235		648	50,422
Torridge and West Devon	DEV	SW	Con	Con	35,904	60.1%	24,992	74.6%	35,904	10,290	10,912	2,077		547	59,730
Totnes	DEV	SW	Con	Con	27,751	53.2%	12,724	74.7%	27,751	8,860	15,027			544	52,182
Tottenham	LND	LND	Lab	Lab	35,621	76.0%	30,175	61.9%	5,446	35,621	3,168	1,873	527	221	46,856
Truro and Falmouth	CUL	SW	Con	Con	27,237	46.0%	4,561	77.2%	27,237	22,676	7,150	1,714		413	59,190
Tunbridge Wells	KEN	SE	Con	Con	30,119	55.1%	14,645	73.0%	30,119	8,098	15,474			959	54,650
Twickenham	LND	LND	LD	LD	36,166	56.1%	14,121	76.0%	22,045	5,476	36,166		816		64,503
Tynemouth	TWR	NE	Lab	Lab	26,928	48.1%	4,857	72.5%	22,071	26,928	3,791	1,281	1,963		56,034
Uxbridge and South Ruislip	LND	LND	Con	Con	25,351	52.6%	7,210	68.5%	25,351	18,141	3,026		1,090	296	47,904
Vauxhall	LND	LND	Lab	Lab	31,615	56.1%	19,612	63.9%	9,422	31,615	12,003	2,516	641	136	56,333
Wakefield	WYK	YTH	Lab	Con	21,283	47.3%	3,358	64.1%	21,283	17,925	1,772		2,725	1,322	45,027
Wallasey	MSY	NW	Lab	Lab	29,901	64.3%	18,322	70.1%	11,579	29,901	1,843	1,132	2,037		46,492
Walsall North	WMD	WM	Con	Con	23,334	63.8%	11,965	54.4%	23,334	11,369	1,236	617			36,556
Walsall South	WMD	WM	Lab	Lab	20,872	49.1%	3,456	62.4%	17,416	20,872	1,602	634	1,660	288	42,472
Walthamstow	LND	LND	Lab	Lab	36,784	76.1%	30,862	68.8%	5,922	36,784	2,874	1,733	768	254	48,335
Wansbeck	NBL	NE	Lab	Lab	17,124	42.3%	814	64.0%	16,310	17,124	2,539	1,217	3,141	178	40,509
Wantage	OXF	SE	Con	Con	34,085	50.7%	12,653	73.9%	34,085	10,181	21,432			1,475	67,173
Warley	WMD	WM	Lab	Lab	21,901	58.8%	11,511	59.7%	10,390	21,901	1,588	891	2,469		37,239
Warrington North	CHS	NW	Lab	Lab	20,611	44.2%	1,509	64.6%	19,102	20,611	3,071	1,257	2,626		46,667
Warrington South	CHS	NW	Lab	Con	28,187	45.5%	2,010	72.0%	28,187	26,177	5,732		1,635	168	61,899
Warwick and Leamington	WAR	WM	Lab	Lab	23,718	43.8%	789	71.0%	22,929	23,718	4,995	1,536	807	220	54,205
Washington and Sunderland West	TWR	NE	Lab	Lab	15,941	42.5%	3,723	56.6%	12,218	15,941	2,071	1,005	5,439	839	37,513
Watford	HRT	E	Con	Con	26,421	45.5%	4,433	69.7%	26,421	21,988	9,323			333	58,065
Waveney	SFK	E	Con	Con	31,778	62.2%	18,002	61.8%	31,778	13,776	2,603	2,727		245	51,129
Wealden	SXE	SE	Con	Con	37,043	60.8%	25,655	73.3%	37,043	9,377	11,388	3,099			60,907
Weaver Vale	CHS	NW	Lab	Lab	22,772	44.9%	562	71.9%	22,210	22,772	3,300	1,051	1,380		50,713
Wellingborough	NTH	EM	Con	Con	32,277	62.2%	18,550	64.3%	32,277	13,737	4,078	1,821			51,913
Wells	SOM	SW	Con	Con	33,336	54.1%	9,991	73.5%	33,336	4,304	23,345			580	61,565
Welwyn Hatfield	HRT	E	Con	Con	27,394	52.6%	10,955	69.5%	27,394	16,439	6,602	1,618			52,053
Wentworth and Dearne	SYK	YTH	Lab	Lab	16,742	40.3%	2,165	55.8%	14,577	16,742	1,705		7,019	1,514	41,557
West Bromwich East	WMD	WM	Lab	Con	16,804	46.7%	1,593	57.9%	16,804	15,211	1,313	627	1,475	545	35,975
West Bromwich West	WMD	WM	Lab	Con	17,419	50.5%	3,799	53.4%	17,419	13,620	915	664	1,841		34,459
West Dorset	DOR	SW	Con	Con	33,589	55.1%	14,106	74.7%	33,589	5,729	19,483	2,124			60,925
West Ham	LND	LND	Lab	Lab	42,181	70.1%	32,388	61.5%	9,793	42,181	4,161	1,780	1,679	606	60,200
West Lancashire	LAN	NW	Lab	Lab	27,458	52.1%	8,336	71.8%	19,122	27,458	2,560	1,248	2,275		52,663
West Suffolk	SFK	E	Con	Con	33,842	65.8%	23,194	64.1%	33,842	10,648	4,685	2,262			51,437
West Worcestershire	HWR	WM	Con	Con	34,909	60.7%	24,499	75.4%	34,909	9,496	10,410	2,715			57,530
Westminster North	LND	LND	Lab	Lab	23,240	54.2%	10,759	65.5%	12,481	23,240	5,593	1,064	418	115	42,911
Westmorland and Lonsdale	CMA	NW	LD	LD	25,795	48.9%	1,934	77.8%	23,861	2,293	25,795		763		52,712
Weston-super-Mare	AVN	SW	Con	Con	31,983	57.5%	17,121	67.4%	31,983	14,862	6,935	1,834			55,614
Wigan	GTM	NW	Lab	Lab	21,042	46.7%	6,728	59.5%	14,314	21,042	2,428	1,299	5,959		45,042
Wimbledon	LND	LND	Con	Con	20,373	38.4%	628	77.7%	20,373	12,543	19,745			366	53,027
Winchester	HAM	SE	Con	Con	28,430	48.3%	985	77.9%	28,430	2,723	27,445			292	58,890
Windsor	BRK	SE	Con	Con	31,501	58.6%	23,354	71.6%	31,501	8,147	11,422	1,798		884	53,752
Wirral South	MSY	NW	Lab	Lab	22,284	51.2%	6,105	76.0%	16,179	22,284	2,917	948	1,219		43,547
Wirral West	MSY	NW	Lab	Lab	20,695	48.2%	3,003	77.3%	17,692	20,695	2,706	965	860		42,918
Witham	ESS	E	Con	Con	32,876	66.6%	24,082	70.1%	32,876	8,794	4,584	3,090			49,344
Witney	OXF	SE	Con	Con	33,856	55.2%	15,177	73.1%	33,856	8,770	18,679				61,305
Woking	SRY	SE	Con	Con	26,396	48.9%	9,767	71.5%	26,396	8,827	16,629	1,485		600	53,937
Wokingham	BRK	SE	Con	Con	30,734	49.6%	7,383	73.8%	30,734	6,450	23,351	1,382		80	61,997
Wolverhampton North East	WMD	WM	Lab	Con	17,722	51.7%	4,080	55.4%	17,722	13,642	960	603	1,354		34,281
Wolverhampton South East	WMD	WM	Lab	Lab	15,522	46.4%	1,235	53.1%	14,287	15,522	1,019	521	2,094		33,443
Wolverhampton South West	WMD	WM	Lab	Con	19,864	48.3%	1,661	67.5%	19,864	18,203	2,041		1,028		41,136
Worcester	HWR	WM	Con	Con	25,856	50.8%	6,758	69.3%	25,856	19,098	3,666	1,694		584	50,898
Workington	CMA	NW	Lab	Con	20,488	49.3%	4,176	67.8%	20,488	16,312	1,525	596	1,749	929	41,599
Worsley and Eccles South	GTM	NW	Lab	Lab	20,446	45.7%	3,219	59.4%	17,227	20,446	2,510	1,300	3,224		44,707
Worthing West	WSX	SE	Con	Con	30,475	55.8%	14,823	69.5%	30,475	15,652	6,024	2,008		489	54,648
Wycombe	BKM	SE	Con	Con	24,766	45.2%	4,214	70.1%	24,766	20,552	6,543	1,454		1,441	54,756
Wyre and Preston North	LAN	NW	Con	Con	31,589	59.7%	16,781	70.4%	31,589	14,808	4,463	1,729		335	52,924
Wyre Forest	HWR	WM	Con	Con	32,960	65.2%	21,413	64.8%	32,960	11,547	4,081	1,973			50,561
Wythenshawe and Sale East	GTM	NW	Lab	Lab	23,855	53.3%	10,396	58.7%	13,459	23,855	3,111	1,559	2,717	58	44,759
Yeovil	SOM	SW	Con	Con	34,588	58.4%	16,181	71.9%	34,588	3,761	18,407	1,629		875	59,260
York Central	NYK	YTH	Lab	Lab	27,312	55.2%	13,545	66.2%	13,767	27,312	4,149	2,107	1,479	691	49,505
York Outer	NYK	YTH	Con	Con	27,324	49.4%	9,985	74.1%	27,324	17,339	9,992			692	55,347
Total for all constituencies								67.4%	12,710,845	9,125,203	3,340,835	819,751	545,172	357,862	26,899,668
Total for all constituencies								67.4%	47.3%	33.9%	12.4%	3.0%	2.0%	1.3%	100.0%
Total for all constituencies								67.4%	Seats						
Total for all constituencies								67.4%	345	179	7	1	0	1	533
Total for all constituencies								67.4%	64.7%	33.6%	2.1%	0.2%	0.0%	0.2%	100.0%

=== Northern Ireland ===
Constituency	2017 result	2019 winning party				Turnout	Votes								
Constituency	2017 result	Party	Votes	Share	Majority	Turnout	DUP	SF	APNI	SDLP	UUP	Con	Grn	Other	Total
Belfast East	DUP	DUP	20,874	49.2%	1,819	64.1%	20,874		19,055		2,516				42,445
Belfast North	DUP	SF	23,078	47.1%	1,943	67.9%	21,135	23,078	4,824						49,037
Belfast South	DUP	SDLP	27,079	57.2%	15,401	67.7%	11,678		6,786	27,079	1,259			550	47,352
Belfast West	SF	SF	20,866	53.8%	14,672	59.1%	5,220	20,866	1,882	2,985				7,829	38,782
East Antrim	DUP	DUP	16,871	45.3%	6,706	57.5%	16,871	2,120	10,165	902	5,475	1,043	685		37,261
East Londonderry	DUP	DUP	15,765	40.1%	9,607	56.8%	15,765	6,128	5,921	6,158	3,599			1,731	39,302
Fermanagh and South Tyrone	SF	SF	21,986	43.3%	57	69.7%		21,986	2,650	3,446	21,929			751	50,762
Foyle	SF	SDLP	26,881	57.0%	17,110	63.4%	4,772	9,771	1,267	26,881	1,088			3,364	47,143
Lagan Valley	DUP	DUP	19,586	43.1%	6,499	60.0%	19,586	1,098	13,087	1,758	8,606	955		315	45,405
Mid Ulster	SF	SF	20,473	45.9%	9,537	63.3%	10,936	20,473	3,526	6,384	2,611			690	44,620
Newry and Armagh	SF	SF	20,287	40.0%	9,287	62.5%	11,000	20,287	4,211	9,449	4,204			1,628	50,779
North Antrim	DUP	DUP	20,860	47.4%	12,721	57.1%	20,860	5,632	6,231	2,943	8,139			246	44,051
North Down	Ind	APNI	18,358	45.2%	2,968	60.6%	15,390		18,358		4,936	1,959			40,643
South Antrim	DUP	DUP	15,149	35.3%	2,689	59.9%	15,149	4,887	8,190	2,288	12,460				42,974
South Down	SF	SF	16,137	32.4%	1,620	62.9%	7,619	16,137	6,916	14,517	3,307			1,266	49,762
Strangford	DUP	DUP	17,705	47.2%	7,071	56.0%	17,705	555	10,634	1,994	4,023	1,476	790	308	37,485
Upper Bann	DUP	DUP	20,501	41.0%	8,210	60.4%	20,501	12,291	6,433	4,623	6,197				50,045
West Tyrone	SF	SF	16,544	40.2%	7,478	62.2%	9,066	16,544	3,979	7,330	2,774		521	972	41,186
Total for all constituencies						61.8%	244,127	181,853	134,115	118,737	93,123	5,433	1,996	19,650	799,034
Total for all constituencies						61.8%	30.6%	22.8%	16.8%	14.9%	11.7%	0.7%	0.2%	2.5%	100.0%
Total for all constituencies						61.8%	Seats								
Total for all constituencies						61.8%	8	7	1	2	0	0	0	0	18
Total for all constituencies						61.8%	44%	39%	6%	11%	0%	0%	0%	0%	100.0%

=== Scotland ===
Constituency	2017 result	2019 winning party				Turnout	Votes							
Constituency	2017 result	Party	Votes	Share	Majority	Turnout	SNP	Con	Lab	LD	Grn	Brx	Other	Total
Aberdeen North	SNP	SNP	20,205	54.0%	12,670	59.9%	20,205	7,535	4,939	2,846	880	1,008		37,413
Aberdeen South	Con	SNP	20,388	44.7%	3,990	69.4%	20,388	16,398	3,834	5,018				45,638
Airdrie and Shotts	SNP	SNP	17,929	45.1%	5,201	62.1%	17,929	7,011	12,728	1,419	685			39,772
Angus	Con	SNP	21,216	49.1%	3,795	67.5%	21,216	17,421	2,051	2,482				43,170
Argyll and Bute	SNP	SNP	21,040	43.8%	4,110	72.2%	21,040	16,930	3,248	6,832				48,050
Ayr, Carrick and Cumnock	Con	SNP	20,272	43.5%	2,329	64.7%	20,272	17,943	6,219	2,158				46,592
Banff and Buchan	Con	Con	21,182	50.1%	4,118	63.4%	17,064	21,182	1,734	2,280				42,260
Berwickshire, Roxburgh and Selkirk	Con	Con	25,747	48.4%	5,148	71.3%	20,599	25,747	2,513	4,287				53,146
Caithness, Sutherland and Easter Ross	LD	LD	11,705	37.2%	204	67%	11,501	5,176	1,936	11,705		1,139		31,457
Central Ayrshire	SNP	SNP	21,486	46.2%	5,304	66.7%	21,486	16,182	6,583	2,283				46,534
Coatbridge, Chryston and Bellshill	Lab	SNP	22,680	47.0%	5,624	66.1%	22,680	6,113	17,056	1,564	808			48,221
Cumbernauld, Kilsyth and Kirkintilloch East	SNP	SNP	24,158	52.8%	12,976	69.35%	24,158	7,380	11,182	2,966				45,686
Dumfries and Galloway	Con	Con	22,678	44.1%	1,805	68.7%	20,873	22,678	4,745	3,133				51,429
Dumfriesshire, Clydesdale and Tweeddale	Con	Con	22,611	46.0%	3,781	71.9%	18,830	22,611	4,172	3,540				49,153
Dundee East	SNP	SNP	24,361	53.8%	13,375	68.4%	24,361	10,986	6,045	3,573			312	45,277
Dundee West	SNP	SNP	22,355	53.8%	12,259	64.5%	22,355	5,149	10,096	2,468		1,271	240	41,579
Dunfermline and West Fife	SNP	SNP	23,727	44.4%	10,669	69.8%	23,727	11,207	13,028	4,262	1,258			53,482
East Dunbartonshire	LD	SNP	19,672	37.1%	149	80.3%	19,672	7,455	4,839	19,523	916		626	53,031
East Kilbride, Strathaven and Lesmahagow	SNP	SNP	26,113	46.4%	13,322	69.4%	26,113	11,961	12,791	3,760	1,153		559	56,337
East Lothian	Lab	SNP	21,156	36.2%	3,886	71.7%	21,156	15,523	17,270	4,071			493	58,513
East Renfrewshire	Con	SNP	24,877	44.9%	5,426	76.6%	24,877	19,451	6,855	4,174				55,357
Edinburgh East	SNP	SNP	23,165	48.4%	10,417	68.9%	23,165	6,549	12,748	3,289	2,064			47,815
Edinburgh North and Leith	SNP	SNP	25,925	43.7%	12,808	73.0%	25,925	11,000	13,117	6,635	1,971	558	138	59,344
Edinburgh South	Lab	Lab	23,745	47.7%	11,095	75.1%	12,650	8,161	23,745	3,819	1,357			49,732
Edinburgh South West	SNP	SNP	24,830	47.6%	11,982	70.9%	24,830	12,848	7,478	4,971	1,265	625	114	52,131
Edinburgh West	LD	LD	21,766	39.9%	3,769	75.2%	17,997	9,283	4,460	21,766	1,027			54,533
Falkirk	SNP	SNP	29,351	52.5%	14,948	66.1%	29,351	14,403	6,243	3,990	1,885			55,872
Glasgow Central	SNP	SNP	19,750	49.2%	6,474	57.9%	19,750	3,698	13,276	1,952	1,429			40,105
Glasgow East	SNP	SNP	18,357	47.7%	5,566	57.1%	18,357	5,709	12,791	1,626				38,483
Glasgow North	SNP	SNP	16,982	46.9%	5,601	63.3%	16,982	3,806	11,381	2,394	1,308	320		36,191
Glasgow North East	Lab	SNP	15,911	46.9%	2,548	55.5%	15,911	3,558	13,363	1,093				33,925
Glasgow North West	SNP	SNP	19,678	49.5%	8,359	62.7%	19,678	6,022	11,319	2,716				39,735
Glasgow South	SNP	SNP	22,829	48.1%	9,005	66.9%	22,829	6,237	13,824	2,786	1,251	516		47,443
Glasgow South West	SNP	SNP	17,643	47.9%	4,900	57.1%	17,643	4,224	12,743	1,435		802		36,847
Glenrothes	SNP	SNP	21,234	51.1%	11,757	63.2%	21,234	6,920	9,477	2,639		1,276		41,546
Gordon	Con	SNP	23,885	42.7%	819	70.2%	23,885	23,066	3,052	5,913				55,916
Inverclyde	SNP	SNP	19,925	48.4%	7,512	65.8%	19,295	6,265	11,783	2,560				39,903
Inverness, Nairn, Badenoch and Strathspey	SNP	SNP	26,247	47.9%	10,440	70.2%	26,247	15,807	4,123	5,846	1,709	1,078		54,810
Kilmarnock and Loudoun	SNP	SNP	24,216	50.8%	12,659	65.8%	24,216	11,557	9,009	2,444			405	47,631
Kirkcaldy and Cowdenbeath	Lab	SNP	16,568	35.2%	1,243	70.2%	16,568	9,449	15,325	2,903	1,628	1,132		47,005
Lanark and Hamilton East	SNP	SNP	22,243	41.9%	5,187	63.9%	22,243	17,056	10,736	3,037				53,072
Linlithgow and East Falkirk	SNP	SNP	25,551	44.2%	11,226	64.5%	25,551	14,285	10,517	4,393	1,184	1,257	588	57,775
Livingston	SNP	SNP	25,617	46.9%	13,435	68.3%	25,617	12,182	11,915	3,457	1,421			54,592
Midlothian	Lab	SNP	20,033	41.5%	5,705	66.4%	20,033	10,467	14,328	3,393				48,221
Moray	Con	Con	22,112	45.3%	413	66.3%	21,599	22,112	2,432	2,269			413	48,825
Motherwell and Wishaw	SNP	SNP	20,622	46.4%	6,268	68.4%	20,622	7,150	14,354	1,675			619	44,420
Na h-Eileanan an Iar	SNP	SNP	6,531	45.1%	2,438	68.6%	6,531	3,216	4,093	637				14,477
North Ayrshire and Arran	SNP	SNP	23,376	48.5%	8,521	65.5%	23,376	14,855	6,702	2,107	1,114			48,154
North East Fife	SNP	LD	19,763	43.1%	1,316	75.3%	18,447	5,961	1,707	19,763				45,878
Ochil and South Perthshire	Con	SNP	26,882	46.5%	4,498	73.4%	26,882	22,384	4,961	3,204			382	57,813
Orkney and Shetland	LD	LD	10,381	44.8%	2,507	67.7%	7,874	2,287	1,550	10,381		900	168	23,160
Paisley and Renfrewshire North	SNP	SNP	23,353	47.0%	11,902	69.0%	23,353	11,217	11,451	3,661				49,682
Paisley and Renfrewshire South	SNP	SNP	21,637	50.2%	10,769	66.9%	21,637	7,571	10,958	2,918				43,084
Perth and North Perthshire	SNP	SNP	27,362	50.6%	7,550	74.5%	27,362	19,812	2,471	3,780		651		54,076
Ross, Skye and Lochaber	SNP	SNP	19,263	48.3%	9,443	73.5%	19,263	6,900	2,448	9,820		710	728	39,869
Rutherglen and Hamilton West	Lab	SNP	23,775	44.2%	5,230	66.5%	23,775	8,054	18,545	2,791			629	53,794
Stirling	Con	SNP	26,895	51.1%	9,254	76.8%	26,895	17,641	4,275	2,867	942			52,620
West Aberdeenshire and Kincardine	Con	Con	22,752	42.7%	843	73.4%	21,909	22,752	2,431	6,253				53,345
West Dunbartonshire	SNP	SNP	22,396	49.6%	9,553	67.9%	22,396	6,436	12,843	1,890	867		708	45,140
Total for all constituencies						68.1%	1,242,380	692,939	511,838	263,417	28,122	13,243	7,122	2,759,061
Total for all constituencies						68.1%	45.0%	25.1%	18.6%	9.5%	1.0%	0.5%	0.3%	100.0%
Total for all constituencies						68.1%	Seats							
Total for all constituencies						68.1%	48	6	1	4	0	0	0	59
Total for all constituencies						68.1%	81%	10%	2%	7%	0%	0%	0%	100.0%

=== Wales ===
Constituency	County	2017 result	2019 winning party				Turnout	Votes							
Constituency	County	2017 result	Party	Votes	Share	Majority	Turnout	Lab	Con	PC	LD	Brx	Grn	Other	Total
Aberavon	WGM	Lab	Lab	17,008	53.8%	10,490	62.3%	17,008	6,518	2,711	1,072	3,108	450	731	31,598
Aberconwy	CON	Con	Con	14,687	46.1%	2,034	71.3%	12,653	14,687	2,704	1,821				31,865
Alyn and Deeside	CON	Lab	Lab	18,271	42.5%	213	68.5%	18,271	18,058	1,453	2,548	2,678			43,008
Arfon	GWN	PC	PC	13,134	45.2%	2,781	68.9%	10,353	4,428	13,134		1,159			29,074
Blaenau Gwent	GNT	Lab	Lab	14,862	49.2%	8,647	59.6%	14,862	5,749	1,722	1,285	6,215	386		30,219
Brecon and Radnorshire	POW	Con	Con	21,958	53.1%	7,131	74.5%	3,944	21,958		14,827			590	41,319
Bridgend	MGM	Lab	Con	18,193	43.1%	1,157	66.7%	17,036	18,193	2,013	2,368	1,811	815		42,236
Caerphilly	GNT	Lab	Lab	18,018	44.9%	6,833	63.5%	18,018	11,185	6,424		4,490			40,117
Cardiff Central	SGM	Lab	Lab	25,605	61.2%	17,179	65.3%	25,605	8,426		6,298	1,006		487	41,822
Cardiff North	SGM	Lab	Lab	26,064	49.5%	6,982	77.0%	26,064	19,082	1,606	3,580	1,311	820	203	52,666
Cardiff South and Penarth	SGM	Lab	Lab	27,382	54.1%	12,737	64.2%	27,382	14,645	2,386	2,985	1,999	1,182		50,579
Cardiff West	SGM	Lab	Lab	23,908	51.8%	10,986	67.4%	23,908	12,922	3,864	2,731	1,619	1,133		46,177
Carmarthen East and Dinefwr	DFD	PC	PC	15,939	38.9%	1,809	71.4%	8,622	14,130	15,939		2,311			41,002
Carmarthen West and South Pembrokeshire	DFD	Con	Con	22,183	52.7%	7,745	71.8%	14,438	22,183	3,633	1,860				42,114
Ceredigion	DFD	PC	PC	15,208	37.9%	6,329	71.3%	6,317	8,879	15,208	6,975	2,063	663		40,105
Clwyd South	CON	Lab	Con	16,222	44.7%	1,239	67.3%	14,983	16,222	2,137	1,496	1,468			36,306
Clwyd West	CON	Con	Con	20,403	50.7%	6,747	69.7%	13,656	20,403	3,907	2,237				40,203
Cynon Valley	MGM	Lab	Lab	15,533	51.4%	8,822	59.1%	15,533	6,711	2,562	949	3,045		1,436	30,236
Delyn	CON	Lab	Con	16,756	43.7%	865	70.3%	15,891	16,756	1,406	2,346	1,971			38,370
Dwyfor Meirionnydd	GWN	PC	PC	14,447	48.3%	4,740	67.5%	3,998	9,707	14,447		1,776			29,928
Gower	WGM	Lab	Lab	20,208	45.4%	1,837	72.0%	20,208	18,371	2,288	2,236	1,379			44,482
Islwyn	GNT	Lab	Lab	15,356	44.7%	5,464	62.0%	15,356	9,892	2,286	1,313	4,834	669		34,350
Llanelli	DFD	Lab	Lab	16,125	42.2%	4,670	63.2%	16,125	11,455	7,048		3,605			38,233
Merthyr Tydfil and Rhymney	GNT	Lab	Lab	16,913	52.4%	10,606	57.3%	16,913	6,307	2,446	1,116	3,604		1,860	32,246
Monmouth	GNT	Con	Con	26,160	52.1%	9,982	74.8%	16,178	26,160	1,182	4,909		1,353	435	50,217
Montgomeryshire	POW	Con	Con	20,020	58.5%	12,138	69.8%	5,585	20,020		7,882			727	34,214
Neath	WGM	Lab	Lab	15,920	43.3%	5,637	65.2%	15,920	10,283	4,495	1,485	3,184	728	661	36,756
Newport East	GNT	Lab	Lab	16,125	44.4%	1,992	62.0%	16,125	14,133	872	2,121	2,454	577		36,282
Newport West	GNT	Lab	Lab	18,977	43.7%	902	65.2%	18,977	18,075	1,187	2,565	1,727	902		43,433
Ogmore	MGM	Lab	Lab	17,602	49.7%	7,805	61.5%	17,602	9,797	2,919	1,460	2,991	621		35,390
Pontypridd	MGM	Lab	Lab	17,381	44.5%	5,887	64.7%	17,381	11,494	4,990		2,917		2,278	39,060
Preseli Pembrokeshire	DFD	Con	Con	21,381	50.4%	5,062	71.2%	16,319	21,381	2,776	1,943				42,419
Rhondda	MGM	Lab	Lab	16,115	54.4%	11,440	59.0%	16,115	4,675	4,069	612	3,733	438		29,642
Swansea East	WGM	Lab	Lab	17,405	51.8%	7,970	57.4%	17,405	9,435	1,905	1,409	2,842	583		33,579
Swansea West	WGM	Lab	Lab	18,493	51.6%	8,116	62.8%	18,493	10,377	1,984	2,993	1,983			35,830
Torfaen	GNT	Lab	Lab	15,546	41.8%	3,742	60.2%	15,546	11,804	1,441	1,831	5,742	812		37,176
Vale of Clwyd	CON	Lab	Con	17,270	46.4%	1,827	65.7%	15,443	17,270	1,552	1,471	1,477			37,213
Vale of Glamorgan	SGM	Con	Con	27,305	49.8%	3,562	71.6%	23,743	27,305				3,251	508	54,807
Wrexham	CON	Lab	Con	15,199	45.3%	2,131	67.4%	13,068	15,199	2,151	1,447	1,222	445		33,532
Ynys Môn	GWN	Lab	Con	12,959	35.5%	1,968	70.4%	10,991	12,959	10,418		2,184			36,552
Total for all constituencies							66.6%	632,035	557,234	153,265	92,171	83,908	15,828	9,916	1,544,357
Total for all constituencies							66.6%	40.9%	36.1%	9.9%	6.0%	5.4%	1.0%	0.6%	100.0%
Total for all constituencies							66.6%	Seats							
Total for all constituencies							66.6%	22	14	4	0	0	0	0	40
Total for all constituencies							66.6%	55%	35%	10%	0%	0%	0%	0%	100.0%

== See also ==
- Notional results of the 2019 United Kingdom general election by 2024 constituency
- Results of the 2017 United Kingdom general election
- Results of the 2015 United Kingdom general election
- Results of the 2010 United Kingdom general election
- List of political parties in the United Kingdom
- List of United Kingdom by-elections (2010–present)
- Opinion polling for the 2019 United Kingdom general election
