= Jay Tidmarsh =

Sir James Napier Tidmarsh KCVO MBE (born 15 September 1932) was the Lord Lieutenant of Bristol from 1996 until 2007.

Educated at Taunton School, Sir James Tidmarsh spent most of his working life in the manufacturing industry in the United Kingdom, Australia and New Zealand. Originally a shoe maker, in 1972 he set up his own company manufacturing specialised flooring for the electronics industry. The product sold all over the world, 75% of the company's output being exported; for services to export he received the M.B.E. in 1989.

He became Lord Lieutenant of Bristol in 1996 having been the High Sheriff of Avon in the preceding year. Since 1979, Tidmarsh has been a member of The Society of Merchant Venturers, a private club whose membership is invited "from individuals who have been successful in their chosen area of business". He was Master of the Merchant Venturers in 1994–95.

Tidmarsh was a founder director of GWR Radio plc and was a director of Business West. He was Chairman of SouthWest One and was Pro-Chancellor of the University of Bristol. Married with two sons, he is a Trustee of several charitable trusts. He has received Honorary Degrees (Doctorates) from both the University of Bristol and UWE.

Honorary titles
Lieutenancy created	Lord Lieutenant of Bristol; 1996–2007	Succeeded by Mary Prior
