= Avon Green Belt =

Area protected from urban development in South West England

Avon Green Belt map Green belt County borders District/Unitary authority borders

The Avon Green Belt, also known as the Bristol and Bath Green Belt (or Bath and Bristol Green Belt), is a non-statutory green belt environmental and planning policy that regulates urban expansion and development in the countryside surrounding the cities of Bristol and Bath in the South West region of England. It covers areas in Bristol, South Gloucestershire, the county of Somerset which include the council areas of North Somerset, Bath and North East Somerset and Somerset, and Wiltshire. Essentially, the function of the green belt is to limit urban sprawl and maintain the open character of areas around the Bristol and Bath built up areas, and nearby towns and villages. The policy is implemented by local planning authorities on the basis of guidance from central government.

== Geography ==
The land area of the green belt is 66,868 hectares, 0.5% of the total land area of England (2010). Much of the green belt lies within the North Somerset, Bath and North East Somerset and South Gloucestershire districts, with smaller areas in the west of Wiltshire, Somerset district and Bristol. Key towns and villages surrounded by or immediately adjoining the green belt include Thornbury, Yate, Chipping Sodbury, Frampton Cotterell, Winterbourne, Coalpit Heath, Keynsham, Bradford on Avon, Trowbridge, Nailsea, Backwell, Portishead, and Clevedon. Bristol Airport is also surrounded by green belt.

The green belt includes parts of two Areas of Outstanding Natural Beauty, Mendip Hills to the south and the Cotswolds to the east. Responsibility and co-ordination of green belt policy rests with local unitary and district councils as these are the local planning authorities; however the area is largely covered by the West of England Combined Authority which has some responsibilities for the infrastructure of the area.

== History of the policy ==
The Bristol and Bath Green Belt was first established through the county development plans for Gloucestershire, Somerset and Wiltshire. In Somerset, the policy was adopted locally in 1957 and formally, with ministerial approval, in 1966. Subsequently, the County of Avon structure plan adopted in 1985 confirmed the general extent of the green belt, with some variations, and detailed boundaries were reviewed through local plans. In 2002, the draft Joint Structure Plan for the West of England again broadly confirmed the extent of the green belt, and set out the following policy: "A Green Belt shall continue to surround and separate Bristol and Bath, and will be kept open in order to:

- check the unrestricted sprawl of the Bristol conurbation and Bath;
- assist in safeguarding the surrounding countryside from encroachment;
- prevent neighbouring towns merging into one another;
- preserve the setting and special character of villages, towns and historic cities; and
- assist in urban regeneration."

The policy is subject to further review as part of the West of England Joint Spatial Plan, to be submitted to the UK government in 2018.

In 2017, the Centre for Cities called for more houses to be built on the Bristol greenbelt, saying that it was the only way to address the housing crisis in the area. They noted that there were only space for 4,300 homes on brownfield land, whereas the three local councils in the region aim to build 85,000 over the next twenty years.

=== Labour government's introduction of the grey belt in 2024 ===
In May 2026, developer Waddeton Park Ltd submitted a controversial proposal to develop a 75-acre agricultural site known as Beehive Field, located off Trowbridge Road between Bradford on Avon and Trowbridge within the Avon Green Belt.

Physically bounded by the River Avon and the Kennet and Avon Canal, the application outlines plans for 224 homes and a 12-hectare country park. The project faces strong opposition from local residents and was unanimously rejected by the Bradford on Avon Town Council in July 2026 due to severe concerns over traffic congestion, infrastructure strain, and the permanent loss of green belt land.

This speculative development was facilitated by the Labour government's late-2024 revisions to the National Planning Policy Framework (NPPF), which established the 'grey belt' designation. This new classification targets previously developed or lower-quality green-belt land that are subjectively viewed as failing to strongly contribute to core green-belt purposes, such as preventing towns from merging or checking urban sprawl. Because Wiltshire Council lacks an up-to-date local plan and a sufficient statutory housing land supply, developers can argue that contested parcels of land qualify for targeted release as grey belt, bypassing traditional protections and leaving these buffer zones vulnerable to encroachment.
