= Severnside =

Area along the River Severn or its estuary

The geographical term Severnside refers to an area adjoining or straddling the River Severn or its estuary in Great Britain.

The term is used by different organisations, in different contexts, to refer to quite different areas. The Severn passes through both England and Wales, in some places forming the boundary between the two. Some uses of "Severnside" relate to areas on both sides of the river, and others only to one or other side.

It generally refers to the cities on either side of the Severn Estuary. These include Cardiff, Newport and Bristol.

== Use of the term to cover both sides of the estuary ==
The term has sometimes been used in attempts to coordinate planning and environmental policy across both English and Welsh sides of the estuary. In 1971, Severnside: A Feasibility Study prepared for the UK Department of the Environment and the Welsh Office addressed the possibility of substantial development and new infrastructure in the Bristol area, south east Wales and Gloucestershire.

The Standing Conference on Severnside Local Authorities (SCOSLA) was formed in 1982 by a number of local councils in England and Wales with a shared interest in proposals for a Severn barrage, and in other matters relating to the Severn estuary as a whole.

The term "Severnside Derby" is sometimes given to football matches between Cardiff City (in Wales) and Bristol City (in England).

== Use of the term within England ==
Because there is no consensus over the term which best describes the economic sub-region centred on Bristol and which extends into the historic counties of Somerset and Gloucestershire, the term "Severnside" is sometimes used for that area. It often refers to the area administered by Avon County Council between 1974 and 1996, which some organisations now refer to as "The West of England" and others as "Greater Bristol". The Avon Valuation Tribunal was renamed the Severnside Valuation Tribunal in 1996. The Severnside Community Rail Partnership is a not-for-profit company established to help improve rail services in the Bristol area.

The term is also sometimes used more specifically to refer to the partly undeveloped area north west of Bristol, between Chittening and Severn Beach, where Imperial Chemical Industries built a large chemical plant in the 1960s, known as ICI Severnside. Various proposals for the development of industry, business parks, housing, and/or a sports stadium have been made for this area in the past. The Severnside beat of Avon and Somerset Police covers broadly this area, but also extends to the Cribbs Causeway retail and business area adjoining the M5 motorway. A number of voluntary groups in the Severn Beach area also use the term to describe their area of coverage.

In Gloucester, the Severnside Project is an environmental improvement scheme covering the river within the city and immediately adjoining areas.

In Shropshire, Severnside Housing is a social housing company which operates the former council housing stock in the former borough of Shrewsbury and Atcham. (The River Severn runs through both Shrewsbury and Atcham.)

== Use of the term within Wales ==
Monmouthshire County Council administers four area committees, including one for "Severnside" which covers the area around Caldicot and Magor. The Severnside Forum is a multi-organisation forum for the same area. The Severnside neighbourhood policing team of Gwent Police also covers a similar area.

Abandoned proposals for a "Severnside International Airport" related to an area reclaimed from the estuary close to the Caldicot Levels east of Newport.
