= High Sheriff of Avon =

Ceremonial officer of Avon, England

The office of High Sheriff is over 1000 years old, with its establishment before the Norman Conquest. The Office of High Sheriff remained first in precedence in the counties until the reign of Edward VII when an Order in Council in 1908 gave the Lord-Lieutenant the prime office under the Crown as the Sovereign's personal representative. The High Sheriff remains the Sovereign's representative in the County for all matters relating to the Judiciary and the maintenance of law and order.

The county of Avon was formed in 1974 and abolished in 1996. Before and after this time the area covered was in a variety of other shrievalties, including Somerset, Bristol and Gloucestershire.

== Officeholders ==
- 1974: Hugh Charles Innes Rogers, of Beach House, Bitton, near Bristol.
- 1975: John Foster Robinson, of St. Georges Hill, Easton-in-Gordano, near Bristol.
- 1976: Simon Melville Wills, of The Manor House, Walton-in-Gordano, Clevedon.
- 1977: Malcolm Allinson Anson, of Hill Court, Congresbury, Bristol.
- 1978: Humphrey Ashley Densham, of 15 Eaton Crescent, Clifton, Bristol.
- 1979: Thomas Lloyd Robinson, of Lechlade, 23 Druid Stoke Avenue, Stoke Bishop, Bristol.
- 1980: Mary Ada Phoebe Towill, of Urchinwood Manor, Congresbury, Bristol.
- 1981: Roderick Macdonald Davidson, of 13 Buckingham Vale, Clifton, Bristol.
- 1982: Peter Douglas Smith, of Westbrook, Flax Bourton, Bristol.
- 1983: Colonel Charles James Stewart, of Thornton, Midford Road, Combe Down, Bath.
- 1984: Christopher Wilson Thomas, of Bourne House
- 1985: Robert Edward John Bernays, of Old Down House, Tockington
- 1986: Sir Alexander Walter Merrison, of The Manor, Hinton Blewett
- 1987: Robert Alexander Chermside, of The Old Rectory, Tormarton
- 1988: Charles Richard Thurlow Laws, of Jerome House
- 1989: Sir George White, 4th Baronet, of Pypers
- 1990: Robert Foxcroft Robertson-Glasgow, of Hinton House, Hinton Charterhouse, near Bath.
- 1991: Andrew Milton Reid, of Parsonage Farm, Publow, Pensford, Bristol.
- 1992: Francis William Greenacre, of 3 Cecil Road, Clifton, Bristol.
- 1993: Hylton Henry Bayntun-Coward
- 1994: Christopher Marsden-Smedley, of Church Farm, Burrington, Bristol.
- 1995: James Napier Tidmarsh, of 8 Princes Buildings, Clifton, Bristol.
- 1996: George Robert Paget Ferguson, of 5 Windsor Terrace, Clifton, Bristol.
