= Sir John Wills, 4th Baronet =

English landowner

Sir John Vernon Wills, 4th Baronet, KCVO, KStJ, TD, JP (3 July 1928 – 26 August 1998) was an English landowner, businessman, farmer and royal representative.

Born on 3 July 1928, Wills came from a prominent Bristol family. One of his ancestors was among the founders of W. D. and H. O. Wills, which became Imperial Tobacco. His grandfather, George Wills, was president of the latter and was created a baronet in 1923; his son (Wills's father), George Vernon Proctor Wills, succeeded to the baronetcy in 1926 and served as a director of Imperial Tobacco, dying in 1931. Wills's mother was Nellie Jeannie Rutherford, ARRC, JP (died 1961).

Educated at Eton and the Royal College of Agriculture, Wills succeeded his elder brother George to the baronetcy in 1945. He took no part in the family business, instead he ran dairy farms and bred Hereford cattle while pursuing a career in the Territorial Army from 1954 to 1967; he received the Territorial Decoration for his service. He held directorships in the Bristol and West Building Society, Bristol Water Holdings Plc, and the Bristol Evening Post and Bristol United Press. He chaired the Wessex Water Authority from 1973 to 1982. He served as Pro-Chancellor of the University of Bath, which awarded him an honorary doctorate (as did the University of Bristol). He was an independent member of the Somerset County Council from 1958 to 1974.

Having been a magistrate for Somerset since 1962 and the High Sheriff of Somerset in 1968, he served as the first and last Lord Lieutenant of Avon, from 1974 to 1996, and as the Lord Lieutenant of Somerset from 1994 to his death. He was appointed a Knight of Grace of the Order of St John of Jerusalem in 1978 and a Knight Commander of the Royal Victorian Order in 1998. He died on 26 August 1998.
