= Charles Bungay Fawcett =

British geographer

Charles Bungay Fawcett (25 August 1883 – 21 September 1952) was a British geographer, regarded as "one of the founders of modern British academic geography" and an early promoter of the idea of regional planning.

He was born into a farming family in Staindrop, County Durham, and went to school in nearby Gainford. He studied science at University College, Nottingham and worked briefly as a schoolteacher before joining the staff under A. J. Herbertson at the then-new School of Geography at Oxford University. He was later a lecturer at University College, Southampton, and Leeds University. In 1928, he was appointed professor of geography at University College London, where he remained until his retirement in 1949.

== Provinces of England ==
He gained national attention for his essay Provinces of England, published in 1919, in which he developed the thinking of Patrick Geddes in suggesting a process of survey and development planning across large regions of England. He subdivided England into 12 "Provinces" – much larger than the county councils which at that time were the next level of government to the national level – and proposed that much regional planning should be carried out at a "provincial" level, crossing existing local authority boundaries. He claimed that "there is nothing sacrosanct in the boundaries of the administrative sub-divisions of England", while recognising that regional boundaries should "pay regard to local patriotism and to tradition". In many ways, Fawcett's thinking foreshadowed much of the development planning system that was applied in England in the second half of the twentieth century, and initiatives towards regional government in England. In 1960 William Gordon East and Sidney William Wooldridge edited a posthumous edition of the essay as a book with updated statistics from the 1951 census.

== Other writings ==
His other books included Frontiers, a Study in Political Geography (1918) and A Political Geography of the British Empire (1933).
