= Lord Lieutenant of Avon =

Civil post in Avon, England

The Lord Lieutenant of the County of Avon from the creation of the county on 1 April 1974 to its abolition in 1996 was Colonel Sir John Vernon Wills, 4th Baronet. He subsequently became Lord Lieutenant of Somerset.
