= Mary Prior =

Lord Lieutenant of Bristol (born 1942)

Mary Prior CVO MBE DStJ JP
- Born: Alice Mary Prior; 22 April 1942 (age 83)
- Occupation: Pro-chancellor of University of Bristol
- Children: one daughter, one son

Alice Mary Prior CVO MBE DStJ JP (born 22 April 1942) served as Lord Lieutenant of Bristol from 2007 to 2017. She is currently the Pro-chancellor of University of Bristol and a trustee of the environmental fund Viridor Credits.

Until her retirement in 1997 she was Sales and Marketing Director of Alexandra, a major workwear and uniform company.

She was given an honorary degree by the University of the West of England "in the recognition of her outstanding contribution to local public service, and her advisory support to the Bristol Business School and links with significant stakeholders of the University of the West of England" and is patron or president of a number of charities based in the Bristol area.

Since being appointed Lord-Lieutenant, Prior has also been made chair of the Commission for Bristol and Avon Magistrates.

Since 2008, Prior has been a member of The Society of Merchant Venturers.

== Personal life ==
Prior was born in Hambrook and educated at Kingswood Grammar School. She is married to John and they have two children and four grandchildren.
