= Avon (county) =

Former non-metropolitan and ceremonial county in England

- Avon shown within England
- Area
  - 1974: 332,596 acres (1,345.97 km^{2})
  - 1994: 134,268 hectares (1,342.68 km^{2})
- Population
  - 1973: 914,180
  - 1981: 900,416
  - 1991: 903,870
- History
  - Origin: Bristol travel-to-work area
  - Created: 1974
  - Abolished: 1996
  - Succeeded by: Bristol; South Gloucestershire; North Somerset; Bath and North East Somerset
- Status: Non-metropolitan county
- ONS code: 08
- Government: Avon County Council
  - HQ: Bristol
- Coat of arms of Avon County Council
- Subdivisions
  - Type: Non-metropolitan districts
  - Units: 1. Northavon; 2. Bristol; 3. Kingswood; 4. Woodspring; 5. Wansdyke; 6. Bath

Avon (/ˈeɪvən, -vɒn/ AY-vən, -von) was a non-metropolitan and ceremonial county in the west of England which existed between 1974 and 1996. The county was named after the River Avon, which flows through the area. It was formed from the county boroughs of Bristol and Bath, together with parts of the administrative counties of Gloucestershire and Somerset.

In 1996, the county was abolished and the area split between four new unitary authorities: Bath and North East Somerset, Bristol, North Somerset and South Gloucestershire. The Avon name is still used for some purposes. The area had a population of approximately 1.08 million people in 2009.

== Background ==
The port of Bristol lies close to the mouth of the River Avon which formed the historic boundary between Gloucestershire and Somerset. In 1373, a charter constituted the area as the County of the Town of Bristol, although it continued to fall within the jurisdiction of the two counties for some purposes.

The appointment of a boundaries commission in 1887 led to a campaign for the creation of a county of Greater Bristol. The commissioners, while recommending that Bristol should be "neither in the county of Gloucester nor of Somerset for any purpose whatsoever", did not extend the city's boundaries. The commission's timidity was attacked by the Bristol Mercury and Daily Post, who accused them of using the "crude method of the Procrustean bed". The newspaper went on to attack Charles Ritchie, the President of the Local Government Board, and the Conservative government:

Everyone who considered the question on its merits was convinced of the justice of the demand for a Greater Bristol, but... the interests of the Tory party were put before every other consideration and we do not think there is any endeavour to conceal the fact.

Under the Local Government Act 1888 Bristol was constituted a county borough, exercising the powers of both a county and city council. The city was extended to take in some Gloucestershire suburbs in 1898 and 1904.

The Local Government Boundary Commission appointed in 1945 recommended the creation of a "one-tier county" of Bristol based on the existing county borough, but the report was not acted upon.

The next proposals for local government reform in the area were made in 1968, when the Redcliffe-Maud Commission made its report. The commission recommended dividing England into unitary areas. One of these was a new Bristol and Bath Area which would have included a wide swathe of countryside surrounding the two cities, extending into Wiltshire and as far as Frome in Somerset. Following a change of government at the 1970 general election, a two-tier system of counties and districts was proposed instead of unitary authorities. In a white paper published in 1971, one of these counties, "Area 26" or "Bristol County", was based on the commission's Bristol and Bath area, but lacked the areas of Wiltshire. The proposals were opposed by Somerset County Council, and this led to the setting up of a "Save Our Somerset" campaign.

By the time the Local Government Bill was introduced to Parliament, the county had been named "Avon". The boundaries of the new county were cut back during the passage of Local Government Bill through Parliament. The Local Government Act 1972 received Royal Assent on 26 October 1972.

== Creation ==
The county came into formal existence on 1 April 1974 when the Local Government Act 1972 came into effect. The new county consisted of the areas of:

- The county boroughs of Bristol and Bath,
- Part of the Administrative County of Gloucestershire:
  - Kingswood Urban District, Mangotsfield Urban District
  - Warmley Rural District, most of Sodbury Rural District and most of Thornbury Rural District
- Part of the Administrative County of Somerset:
  - Municipal Borough of Weston-super-Mare
  - Clevedon Urban District, Keynsham Urban District, Norton-Radstock Urban District, Portishead Urban District,
  - Bathavon Rural District, Long Ashton Rural District, part of Axbridge Rural District and part of Clutton Rural District.

The county was divided into six districts:

- Bristol and Bath had identical boundaries to the former county boroughs.
- In the north, two districts were created:
  - the urban districts of Kingswood and Mangotsfield, and the rural district of Warmley formed a single District of Kingswood,
  - the rest of the areas transferred from Gloucestershire (the rural districts of mostly Sodbury and mostly Thornbury) became the District of Northavon.
- In the south, there were two districts:
  - on the coast: Woodspring (merger of the municipal borough of Weston-super-Mare, the urban districts of Clevedon and Portishead, and the rural districts of Long Ashton and part of Axbridge),
  - and in the interior: Wansdyke (merger of the urban districts of Keynsham and Norton-Radstock, and the rural districts of Bathavon and part of Clutton).

To the north the county bordered Gloucestershire, to the east Wiltshire and to the south Somerset. In the west it had a coast on the Severn Estuary and Bristol Channel.

The area of Avon was 520 square miles (1,347 km^{2}) and its population in 1991 was 919,800. Cities and towns in Avon included (in approximate order of population) Bristol, Bath, Weston-super-Mare, Yate, Clevedon, Portishead, Midsomer Norton & Radstock, Bradley Stoke, Nailsea, Yatton, Keynsham, Kingswood, Thornbury, Filton and Patchway.

The coat of arms created for the county featured six blue and white waves representing the river Avon and parts of the coats of arms of the incorporated areas. The shield featured a wyvern from the arms of Somerset divided into gold and red by a chevron from the arms of Gloucestershire.

The crest combined the unicorn of Bristol with the sword of St. Paul (one of the patron saints of Bath Abbey) and the crown of King Edgar, who was crowned King of England by St. Dunstan in Bath Abbey.

The sea-stags were created for Avon to represent the historic importance of the Avon ports and the Royal Forest which covered a large part of the county. As a heraldic badge, a sea-stag continued to be used by some organisations in the geographical area.

== Demise ==
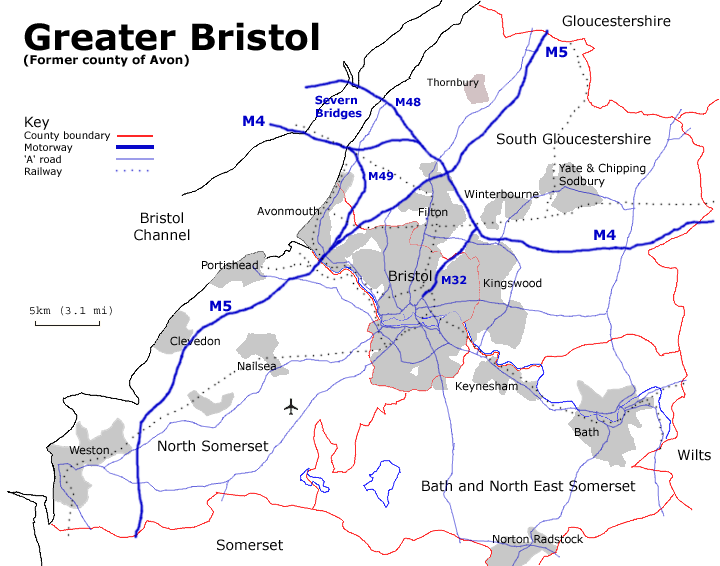
Map of the former Avon area, now sometimes called Greater Bristol

Avon was one of the counties in the "first tranche" of reviews conducted by the Banham Commission in the 1990s. The Commission recommended that it and its districts be abolished and replaced with four unitary authorities. The Avon (Structural Change) Order 1995 was debated in the House of Commons on 22 February 1995. The Order came into effect on 1 April 1996. The four authorities that replaced Avon are:

1. The City and County of Bristol
2. South Gloucestershire – formed from the Kingswood and Northavon districts.
3. North Somerset – formed from the Woodspring district.
4. Bath and North East Somerset – formed from the Bath and Wansdyke districts.

For ceremonial purposes, the post of Lord Lieutenant of Avon was abolished and Bristol regained its own Lord Lieutenant and High Sheriff, while the other authorities were returned to their traditional counties. Suggestions to alter Bristol's boundaries (either by drawing new boundaries or by merely incorporating the mostly urbanised borough of Kingswood into it) were rejected.

== Legacy ==
The demise of the County of Avon was the focus of a BBC documentary called The End of Avon, produced by Linda Orr and Michael Lund and broadcast in 1996. In 2006, the BBC Somerset presenter Adam Thomas, in a BBC One regional programme Inside Out West, investigated why Avon refuses to die. Systems inertia means that the county continues to be included in the databases of large corporations as part of addresses in the area. Some private organisations such as the Avon Wildlife Trust choose to retain their name. The Royal Mail indicated that it is not necessary to include Avon (or any other postal county) as part of any address as it had abandoned their use in 1996.

For the purposes of parliamentary constituency boundaries, Avon is still used

Some public bodies still cover the area of the former county of Avon: for example, Avon Fire and Rescue Service, the Avon Coroner's District, Avon and Wiltshire Mental Health Partnership NHS Trust, the West of England Strategic Partnership, Intelligence West, and until 2006 the Avon Ambulance Service, when it merged with the Gloucestershire and Wiltshire ambulance services to form the Great Western Ambulance Service, which subsequently merged with South Western Ambulance Service. The former county and its southern neighbour form the area covered by Avon and Somerset Constabulary (governed by the Avon and Somerset Police and Crime Commissioner). Though there is no longer a single council, the four unitary authorities still co-operate on many aspects of policy, such as the Joint Local Transport Plan. Currently, the term "West of England" is used by some organisations to refer to the former Avon area, such as the West of England Local Enterprise Partnership. Avon continued to be used unofficially in boundary reviews for parliamentary constituencies.

The term CUBA, the "County (or Councils) that Used to Be Avon", was coined to refer to the Avon area after abolition of the county. The term Severnside is sometimes used as a substitute for "Avon", although the term can also be used to refer to the stretch of shoreline from Avonmouth north to Aust, or from Newport to Chepstow. "Greater Bristol" is also used.

The Forest of Avon is a community forest covering part of the area of the four local authorities. Other relics of Avon's existence include the Avon Cycleway (first designed and promoted by Cyclebag), an 85-mile (137 km) circular route on quiet roads and cycle paths, which was a precursor of the National Cycle Network. Also, Avon County Council helped fund Sustrans' first cycleway, the Bristol and Bath Railway Path. The Avon Green Belt has continued in place as a jointly agreed policy in the development plans of the successor local authorities.

The West of England Combined Authority (1–3), alongside North Somerset (4), covers the same area as the defunct county of Avon

In 2016 the government proposed that the four local authorities that replaced Avon come together in a West of England Combined Authority with a "metro mayor" who would oversee a new combined authority, to create a "Western Powerhouse" analogous to the government's Northern Powerhouse concept. North Somerset council rejected the proposal but the other three authorities accepted the deal; the combined authority was subsequently established in 2017, with the inaugural mayoral election taking place in the May of that year.

As of 2024, a multi-operator unlimited travel daily or weekly bus ticket called AvonRider covering the former county area was still available, supported by local councils.

== See also ==
- List of Lord Lieutenants of Avon
- List of High Sheriffs of Avon
- List of Sites of Special Scientific Interest in Avon
- List of places in Avon
- Cleveland (county)
- Humberside
