= Hunstrete =

Village in Somerset, England

Coordinates: 51.360°N 2.507°W

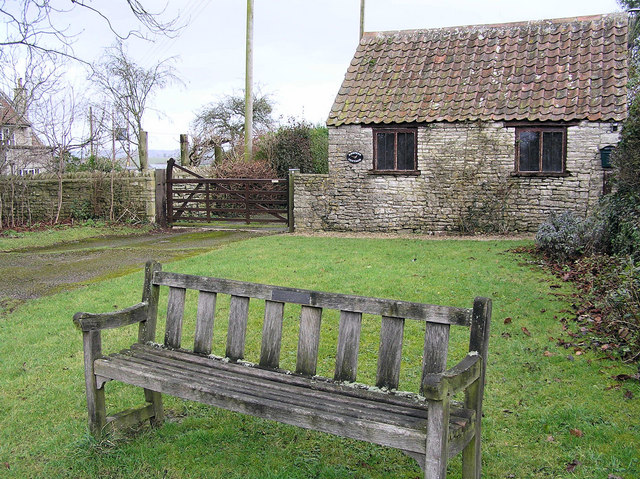
- Hunstrete Green

- Location within Somerset
- Population: approx. 100
- OS grid reference: ST647624
- Unitary authority: Bath and North East Somerset
- Ceremonial county: Somerset
- Region: South West
- Country: England
- Sovereign state: United Kingdom
- Post town: BATH
- Postcode district: BA2
- Dialling code: 01761
- Police: Avon and Somerset
- Fire: Avon
- Ambulance: South Western
- UK Parliament: North East Somerset and Hanham

Hunstrete (grid reference ST625643) is a small village on the River Chew in the Chew Valley, Bath and North East Somerset, England. It falls within the civil parish of Marksbury and is 8 miles (13 km) from Bath and Bristol, and 5 miles (8 km) from Keynsham. It is just off the A368 between Marksbury and Chelwood.

== History ==
The origin of the name Hunstrete is unclear. One explanation is that it means 'The hundred road' from the Old English hund and street. Other possible derivations are the personal name hund and Old English steort meaning a projecting piece of land, or hund, meaning hound or dog, relating to the place where they were kept.

Although occupation during the Iron Age is possible the earliest evidence are Roman coins from the emperor Carausius, and continuous occupation during the Saxon period may have been connected with the nearby Wansdyke. A charter of 936 suggests the land was given to a thegn by the name of Ethelelm by Æthelstan. The manor was granted to Glastonbury Abbey who held it until the dissolution of the monasteries in 1539 when it was forfeit to the crown and granted to Richard Watkins.

At the beginning of the 17th century it passed to the family of Sir John Popham, whose descendants sold off portions of land in the intervening years but owned Hunstrete House until 1977.

== Government and politics ==
Hunstrete is part of the Bathavon South Ward, which is represented by two councillors on the Bath and North East Somerset Unitary Authority, which has responsibilities for services such as education, refuse, tourism etc. The village is a part of Frome and East Somerset. Prior to Brexit in 2020, it was part of the South West England constituency of the European Parliament.

== Demographics ==
According to the 2001 Census, the Farmborough Ward (which includes Compton Dando, Marksbury, Woollard and Chewton Keynsham), had 1,111 residents, living in 428 households, with an average age of 44.5 years. Of these 71% of residents describing their health as 'good', 21% of 16- to 74-year-olds had no qualifications; and the area had an unemployment rate of 1.0% of all economically active people aged 16–74. In the Index of Multiple Deprivation 2004, it was ranked at 22,100 out of 32,482 wards in England, where 1 was the most deprived LSOA and 32,482 the least deprived.

== Hunstrete House ==
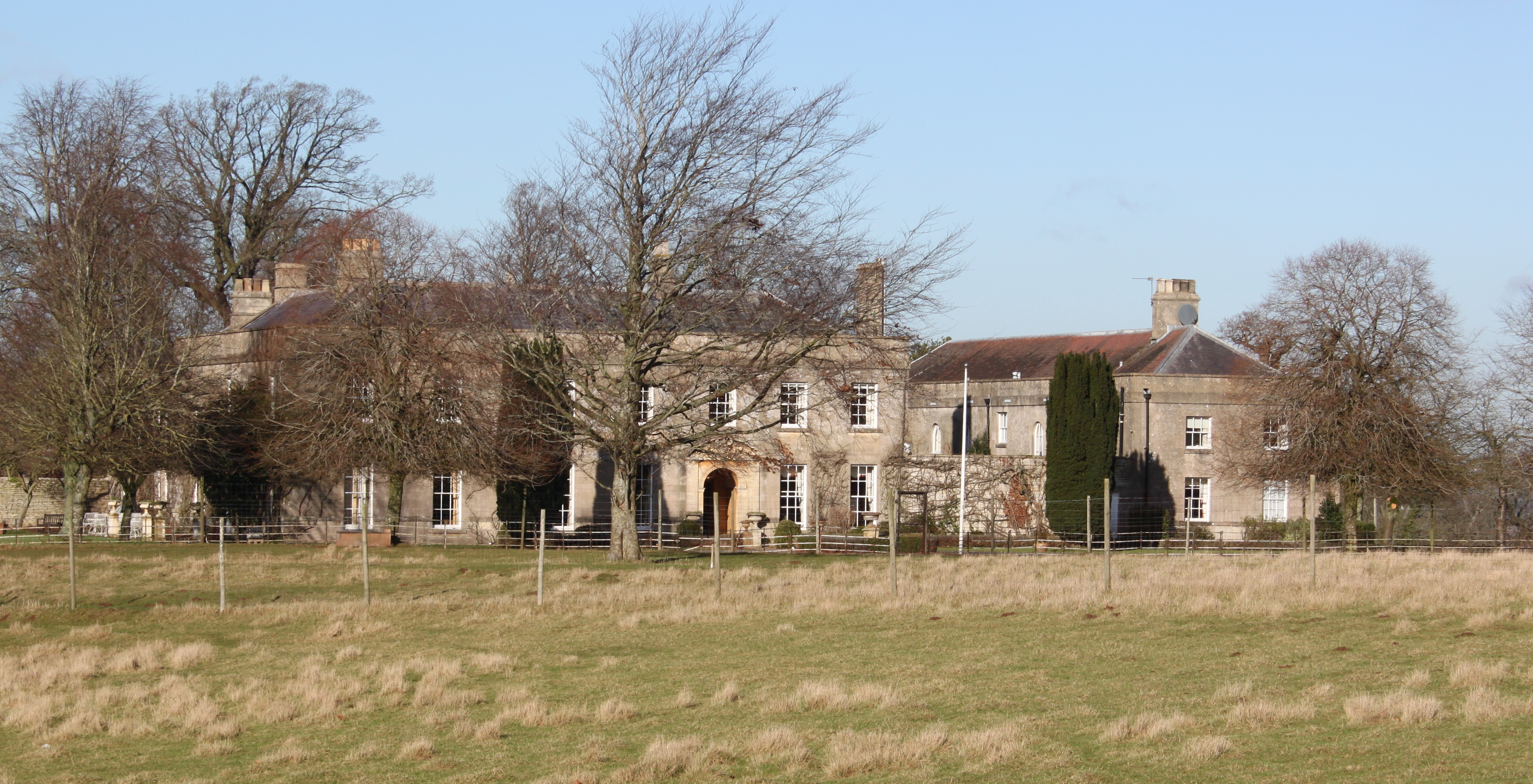
Hunstrete House

Hunstrete House is a Grade II listed building dating from 1820. In its grounds are Hunstrete Lake, a walled garden and an icehouse which is also a listed building.

In September 2007 a team from the television programme Time Team visited Hunstrete to explore stories about the "Grand Mansion" which preceded the current house. It is thought that Francis Popham (died 1779), a descendant of Sir John Popham, started the construction of a 17-bay mansion which was, however, suspended after his death and abandoned after the death of his wife Dorothy (Hutton) in 1797. The construction which had taken place was demolished in 1836, leaving just a line of arches. The main staircase, fireplace and chandelier were used in the restoration of Prior Park in Bath. The excavations undertaken tried to identify whether there was a previous medieval or Tudor manor house on the site. The programme was aired on 17 February 2008, and showed that the "Grand Mansion" was really the addition of a new exterior to a previous building.

== Other buildings of note ==
Other Grade II listed buildings in the area are a pair of mid-nineteenth-century cottages, and a fragment of an arcade from an earlier large house, dating from c.1700.
