= Burnett, Somerset =

Village in Somerset, England

Coordinates: 51.3833°N 2.4833°W

Burnett
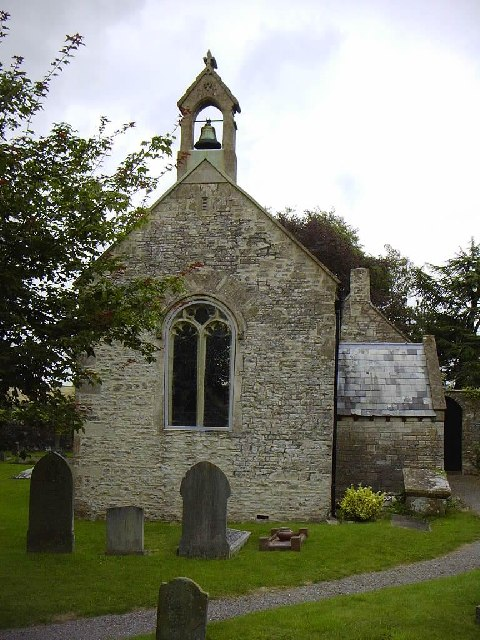
- Church of St Michael

- Location within Somerset
- Population: 68
- OS grid reference: ST6646165032
- Civil parish: Compton Dando
- Unitary authority: Bath and North East Somerset
- Ceremonial county: Somerset
- Region: South West
- Country: England
- Sovereign state: United Kingdom
- Post town: BRISTOL
- Postcode district: BS39
- Dialling code: 0117
- Police: Avon and Somerset
- Fire: Avon
- Ambulance: South Western
- UK Parliament: North East Somerset and Hanham

Burnett is a small village within the civil parish of Compton Dando, approximately 500 metres (1,600 ft) from the River Chew in the Chew Valley within the unitary authority area of Bath and North East Somerset in Somerset, England. The nearest town is Keynsham, which lies approximately 3 miles (4.8 km) north of the village. The parish had an acreage of 608 acres (246 ha). It is within the Bristol/Bath Green Belt.

== History ==
The origin of the name Burnett is most likely derived from the old English word baernet, meaning a place cleared by burning, and the earliest evidence of a settlement was in the period of the Roman occupation.

Burnett later appeared in the Domesday Book of 1086 with 30 inhabitants. In 1102 the village came under the control of the powerful ecclesiastical body of Tewkesbury Abbey and the Benedictine monks stopped to worship and rest at St Michael's Church en route to Glastonbury.

The manor was held by Edith of Wessex, probably from the time of her marriage to King Edward the Confessor in 1045, until her death in 1074. Along with other lands in Somerset, it was reverted to William the Conqueror.

The religious upheavals of the 16th century saw Burnett finish in the hands of a wealthy Bristol merchant named John Cutte, (later, mayor of Bristol) and a fine wall brass (dated 1575) on the church's chancel wall commemorates his family.

The next notable was another Bristol merchant, John Whitson, who, on his death, bequeathed the parish of Burnett in trust to found a school for the orphaned daughters of Bristol's aldermen and merchants, where "the said children to go and be apparelled in red". Thus was founded the country's oldest surviving girls' school, Red Maids School.

The parish of Burnett was part of the Keynsham Hundred,

The growing population of Burnett gave rise to the need for a village school which was built in 1859 and the 1871 census showed the highest number of residents as 101. However, following the drift from agriculture based livelihood to urban living the school was closed in 1922.

In 1931 the parish had a population of 56. On 1 April 1933 the parish was abolished and merged with Compton Dando.

In 2013 Burnett still has two working farms which are largely arable with some pasture land for sheep grazing and the Paget family have been farming Elm farm since 1755.

Although the number of dwellings has increased, this is as a result of barn conversions rather than new buildings. The fact that Burnett has spent two lots of 400 years under the single ownership of first the church and then Bristol Municipal Charities, has resulted in little change with the village managing to maintain much of its character. There are now 23 homes with a population of around 60. The majority of residents no longer work on the land but commute to Bristol and Bath, run their businesses from home or are retired.

The only communal building, St Michael's church, still holds regular services as part of the Parish of Kenysham as it has done for over 1000 years. The old village pump, once the only source of water, stands at the centre of the village and was renovated in 2000 to mark the millennium.

A small industrial estate off Gypsy Lane in the village includes premises for Network Commercial Systems Ltd, Helphire (UK) Ltd Aurora Scientific, Bath Bus Co, Casella Hazmat, Crescent Sash Services, Top Tier, Wessex Plant and other small companies.

== Geography ==
The rocks underlying Burnett Village and the immediately surrounding fields are the limestones and shales of the Lias Group. The village itself is underlain by Blue Lias limestones, while the White Lias is found in the fields to the immediate south and west. A prominent Fault system (Burnett Fault) runs approximately east–west just to the north of the village (an extension of the Newton fault,), and the two rises on Burnett Hill (B3116) represent the eroded scarps of two branches of this fault. In contrast, the steady incline of the B3116 from Burnett south to the junction with the A39 represents the geological dip of the top of the Blue Lias.

The steep slope marking the edge of the Chew Valley, immediately west of Burnett village, is an erosional scarp through the softer red and green shales of the Triassic Mercia Mudstone.

The fields in the bottom of the valley, north of the Burnett Fault, are underlain by the Supra- Pennant Measures of the Carboniferous period, represented by the Pensford Syncline coal basin, which formed part of the Somerset coalfield. It is a complex formation containing coal seams and is made up of clay and shales. Coal was locally worked near Burnett in the past. South of the fault, towards Compton Dando, the red colour of the fields indicates that the lower flanks of the valley are underlain by the Mercia Mudstone. In the floodplain of the river there are alluvial deposits of clay soils.

=== Climate ===
Along with the rest of South West England, Burnett has a temperate climate which is generally wetter and milder than the rest of the country. The annual mean temperature is approximately 10 °C (50.0 °F). Seasonal temperature variation is less extreme than most of the United Kingdom because of the adjacent sea temperatures. The summer months of July and August are the warmest with mean daily maxima of approximately 21 °C (69.8 °F). In winter mean minimum temperatures of 1 °C (33.8 °F) or 2 °C (35.6 °F) are common. In the summer the Azores high pressure affects the south-west of England, however convective cloud sometimes forms inland, reducing the number of hours of sunshine. Annual sunshine rates are slightly less than the regional average of 1,600 hours. In December 1998 there were 20 days without sun recorded at Yeovilton. Most of the rainfall in the south-west is caused by Atlantic depressions or by convection. Most of the rainfall in autumn and winter is caused by the Atlantic depressions, which is when they are most active. In summer, a large proportion of the rainfall is caused by sun heating the ground leading to convection and to showers and thunderstorms. Average rainfall is around 700 mm (28 in). About 8–15 days of snowfall is typical. November to March have the highest mean wind speeds, and June to August have the lightest winds. The predominant wind direction is from the south-west.

== Education ==
The nearest schools are in Keynsham including St Johns primary school, Castle Primary school, Chandag infants and junior school and new school St Keyna primary school (a merge of Keynsham primary school and 150 yr old Temple Primary school). There are also two secondary schools, Wellsway School and Broadlands School.

== Religious sites ==
The Church of St Michael dates from the 13th century and is a Grade II listed building. It contains a monumental brass to John Cutte (mayor of Bristol) from 1575.

== Landmarks ==
Burnett has five listed buildings; being the beautiful grade II Tudor Manor house; the grade II Regency Burnett house; St Michael's church and two ancient tombs either side of the church porch.

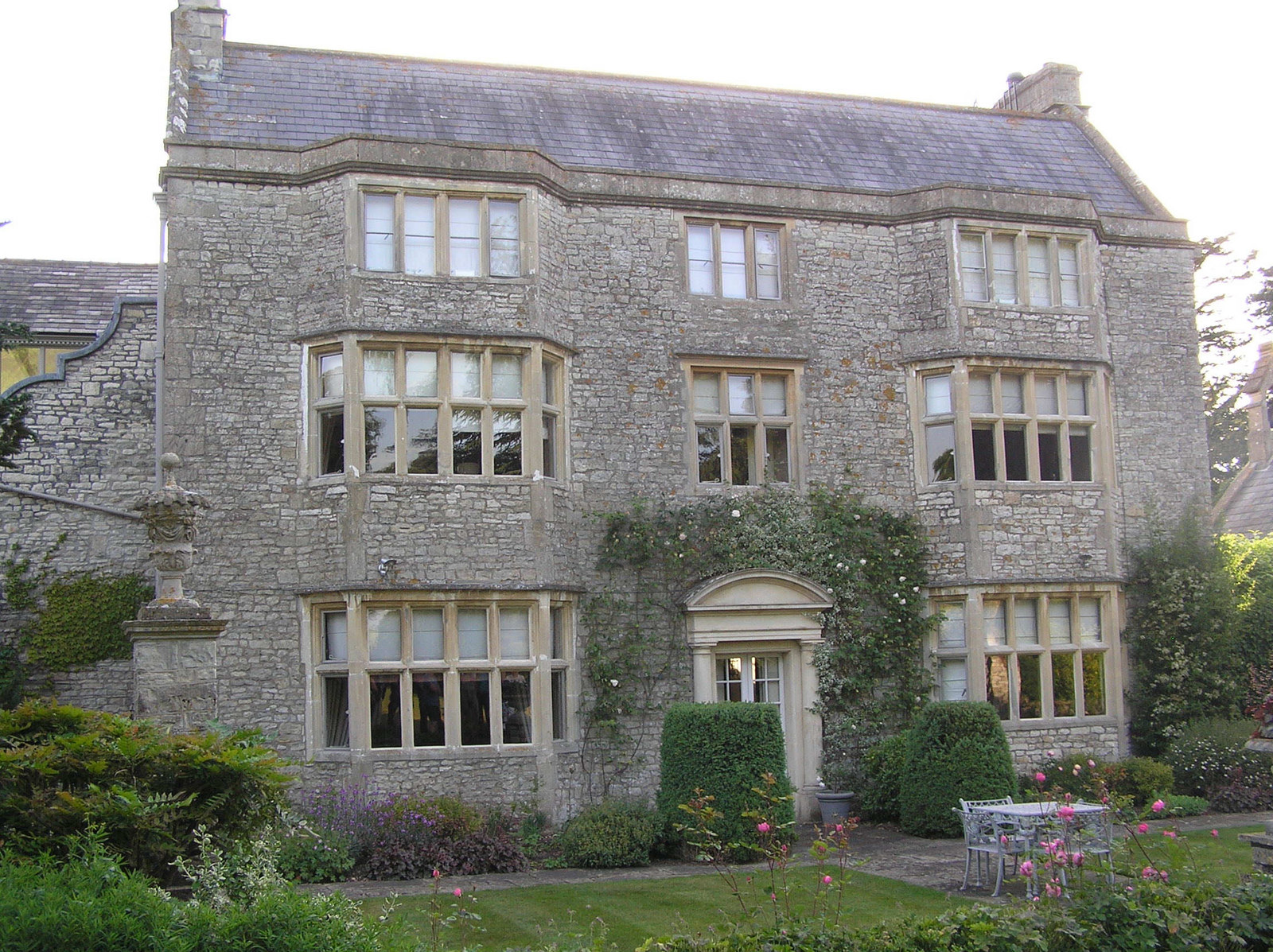
Burnett Manor House

The Manor House, Burnett is a 17th-century manor house.
