= Woollard =

Village in Somerset, England

Coordinates: 51.3792°N 2.5334°W

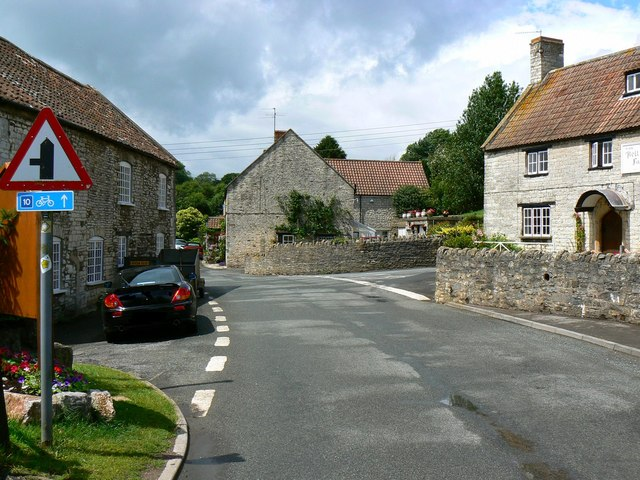
- The centre of the village

- Location within Somerset
- Population: 130 (2011)
- OS grid reference: ST632645
- Civil parish: Compton Dando
- Unitary authority: Bath and North East Somerset
- Ceremonial county: Somerset
- Region: South West
- Country: England
- Sovereign state: United Kingdom
- Post town: BRISTOL
- Postcode district: BS39
- Dialling code: 01761
- Police: Avon and Somerset
- Fire: Avon
- Ambulance: South Western
- UK Parliament: North East Somerset and Hanham

Woollard is a small village on the River Chew in the affluent Chew Valley in England. It is in the Bath and North East Somerset council area and the ceremonial county of Somerset. The village is 7 miles (11 km) from Bristol, 9 miles (14 km) from Bath, and 4 miles (6.4 km) from Keynsham.

The special architectural and historic interest of Woollard was recognised by its designation as a Conservation Area on 25 July 1990.

== History ==
Woollard had a medieval bridge with three pointed arches and double arch-ribs. This was rebuilt following the substantial damage caused by the floods of 1968.

It is close to the route of the ancient Wansdyke, and lies on the Monarch's Way long-distance footpath.

Woollard is also a traditional surname, having relations in the farming land of Saffron Walden and Suffolk.

Woollard is an ancient name of uncertain origin. It is generally believed to derive either from the Norman Conquest of 1066, with the name originating from the Norman personal name Willard, itself derived from Germanic roots wil, meaning "desire", and hard, meaning "strong", overall meaning "strong-willed" or "resolute", or from the Old English pre-7th century personal name "Wulfweard", composed of the elements "wulf", meaning "wolf", and "weard", meaning "guardian" or "protector", with the name overall meaning "wolf guard" or "wolf protector".

== Government and politics ==
Woollard is partly in the civil parish of Compton Dando and partly in the civil parish of Publow. It is part of the Saltford Ward, which is represented by two councillors on the Bath and North East Somerset Unitary Authority which has responsibilities for services such as education, refuse, tourism etc. The village is a part of the North East Somerset and Hanham constituency. Prior to Brexit in 2020, it was part of the South West England constituency of the European Parliament.

== Demographics ==
According to the 2001 Census, the Farmborough Ward (which includes Compton Dando, Marksbury, Hunstrete and Chewton Keynsham), had 1,111 residents, living in 428 households, with an average age of 44.5 years. Of these 71% of residents describing their health as 'good', 21% of 16- to 74-year-olds had no qualifications; and the area had an unemployment rate of 1.0% of all economically active people aged 16–74. In the Index of Multiple Deprivation 2004, it was ranked at 22,100 out of 32,482 wards in England, where 1 was the most deprived LSOA and 32,482 the least deprived.

== Listed Buildings ==
Woollard has a variety of Grade II listed buildings:

- Historic England. "Nos. 178 and 179 (1312829)". National Heritage List for England.
- Historic England. "182-185 (1365673)". National Heritage List for England.
- Historic England. "Paradise Row, 186-189 (1136429)". National Heritage List for England.
- Historic England. "Newbridge House (1129497)". National Heritage List for England.
- Historic England. "Bell Farmhouse (Formerly the Bell Inn) (1129496)". National Heritage List for England.
- Historic England. "K6 Telephone Kiosk (1136483)". National Heritage List for England.
- Historic England. "Woollard House (1312778)". National Heritage List for England.

== Bibliography ==
- "The great flood of 1968". Memories of Bristol. Archived from the original on 2 May 2006.
- Janes, Rowland (2003). Pensford, Publow and Woollard: A Topographical History. Biografix. ISBN 0-9545125-0-2.
