= Monarch's Way =

Long-distance footpath in England

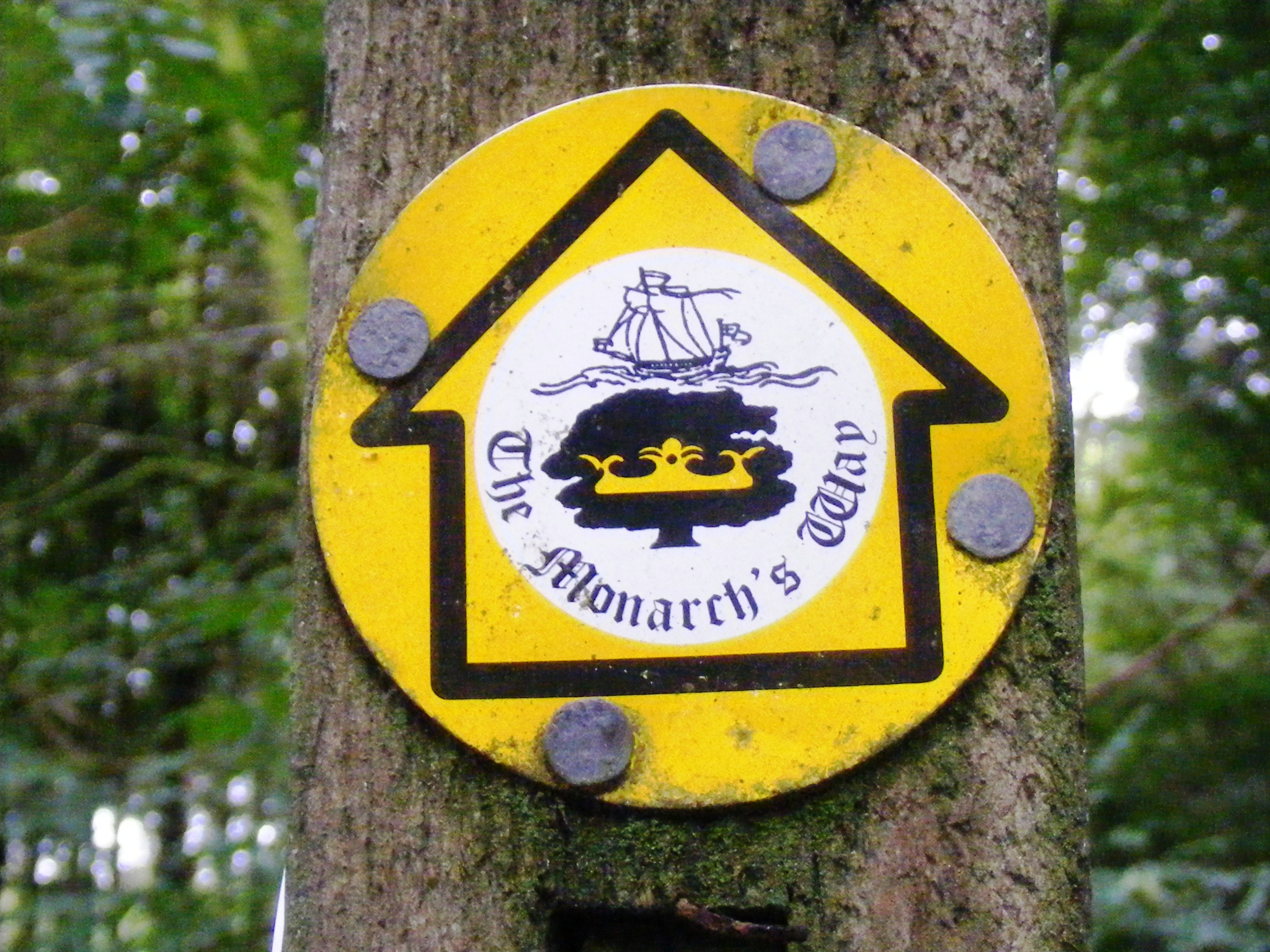
- Waymark on a public footpath
- Length: 615 mi (990 km)
- Location: Warwickshire, Worcestershire, Staffordshire, Sussex, Gloucestershire, Hampshire, Shropshire, Somerset, Devon, Wiltshire and Dorset, England.
- Trailheads: Worcester – Shoreham-by-Sea
- Use: Hiking
- Sights: Cotswolds, Mendip Hills

The Monarch's Way is a 625-mile (1,006 km) long-distance footpath in England that approximates the escape route taken by King Charles II in 1651 after being defeated in the Battle of Worcester. It runs from Worcester via Bristol and Yeovil to Shoreham, West Sussex.

All of the route is waymarked, using a logo with a drawing of the ship Surprise above a Prince of Wales three-point feathered crown on a silhouette of the Royal Oak tree (which is at Boscobel House). The route is shown as a series of green diamonds on the Ordnance Survey (larger scale) 1:25000 maps, and of red diamonds on its 1:50000 maps.

The route was established in 1994 by Trevor Antill, and was published in a three volume guide. The trail is maintained by the Monarch's Way Association in partnership with local highway authorities.

== Route description ==
From its starting point at Worcester the route travels north to Boscobel and then south to Stratford upon Avon. It then continues south to Stow on the Wold before turning south west towards Bristol via Cirencester.

South of Bristol the route is almost directly south across the Mendip Hills to Wells, continues through Somerset almost to Yeovil and then south west to Charmouth in Dorset. There is then a short section along the Dorset coast before turning north again to Yeovil, before turning east and following much of the escarpment of Cranborne Chase, the Hampshire Downs and South Downs to Shoreham-by-Sea where it has a short extension to neighbouring Brighton and Hove, being its historic port and today a main yachting centre in Sussex.

The Monarch's Way is an approximation of the King's route using available public rights of way and visiting places noted in the historic records. Most of the route has been radically changed in the intervening centuries by enclosure, mining, urbanisation and the building of roads, canals and railways. Use of canals and disused railways allows a more pleasant walk than taking to the public highway and provides an insight into industrial history particularly of the Black Country.

=== Worcester to Stratford-upon-Avon via Boscobel (180 mi, 290 km) ===
A memorial near Powick Bridge commemorates the thousands of Scots who perished in the Royalist cause at the Battle of Worcester. Powick Bridge saw both the first and last engagements of the English Civil War. From here the footpath follows the banks of the River Teme and River Severn across the battlefield to enter the 'Faithful City' of Worcester . The King watched the battle unfold from the tower of the cathedral before fleeing with Colonel Charles Giffard of Chillington and others.

The Monarch's Way leaves the city past the Commandery, now a museum, on the towpath of the Worcester & Birmingham Canal then crossing to the Droitwich Canal, to Droitwich. Heading north it passes Chaddesley Corbett and Hagley on its way to Stourbridge. Here it joins the towpath of the Stourbridge Canal negotiating the four locks at Stourton to join the Staffordshire & Worcestershire Canal. Continuing north along the canal to the Bratch Locks at Wombourne to pick up the trackbed of the former Oxford, Worcester and Wolverhampton Railway now the South Staffordshire Railway Walk to Oaken. Leaving the railway the northerly route continues passing Pendrell Hall and Boscobel to White Ladies Priory. The King was hidden overnight in the house by Richard Pendrell.

The next part of the route traces the King's unsuccessful attempt to cross the River Severn to escape into Wales. Leaving White Ladies and the nearby Pendrell home at Hubbal Grange the route turns west via Tong to Evelith Mill and Kemberton. Reaching Madeley it became apparent that the river crossings were well guarded and the King spent a night in the 'Royal Barn' before beating a hasty retreat. Retracing the route through Norton and Beckbury to Boscobel House where the King hid in an oak tree to avoid capture. A descendant of the Royal Oak stands in the grounds of the English Heritage property.

An alternative plan was hatched for the King's escape and the path now heads east. Crossing the grounds of Chillington Hall and using sections of the Shropshire Union Canal and Staffordshire & Worcestershire Canal it reaches Moseley Old Hall, now a National Trust property, where the King was hidden in a 'Priest hole'. From Moseley Old Hall the King left in the night for Bentley Hall with Colonel Lane. The Monarch's Way passes Northycote Farm and Essington before entering the fringe of the urban West Midlands. The route follows the Wyrley & Essington Canal the 'Curly Wyrley' and the ancient forest at Rough Wood to reach Bentley Hall at Bentley, West Midlands.

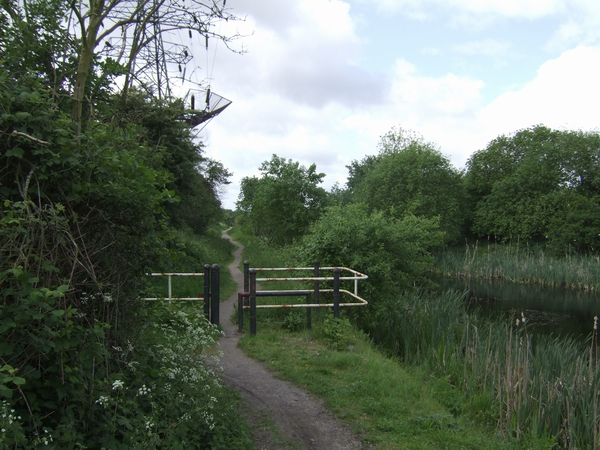
Monarch's Way following the towpath of the Anson Branch Canal

The Monarch's Way picks up the closed Anson Branch Canal. This section of the Monarch's Way follows the canal system through the heart of the Black Country using Walsall Canal, Wednesbury Old Canal, Netherton Tunnel and Dudley Canal to Halesowen. Then Bromsgrove, Headless Cross, Alcester, Wootton Wawen, Snitterfield and Welcombe Hills Country Park. Finally following the Stratford-upon-Avon Canal until it joins the River Avon in the centre of Stratford-upon-Avon.

=== Stratford-upon-Avon to Charmouth (210 mi, 340 km) ===
The Royal Shakespeare Theatre in Stratford-upon-Avon is the start of this leg of the Monarch's Way. Following the west bank of the River Avon south and passing Holy Trinity Church, with its connections to William Shakespeare. Crossing both the River Avon then the River Stour near to Stratford racecourse. The path then follows the route of the Honeybourne Line to Long Marston. Leaving east on the route of the Heart of England Way and passing through Lower Quinton and Upper Quinton to meet with the Centenary Way which it follows east round Meon Hill at the start of the Cotswolds. Leaving the Centenary Way in a south westerly direction it enters Gloucestershire and passes Hidcote Manor Garden, owned by the National Trust, before rejoining the Heart of England Way. The path crosses Campden Tunnel on the Cotswold railway line and enters the market town of Chipping Campden.

Moreton-in-Marsh, Stow-on-the-Wold, Northleach, Cirencester, Tetbury, Chipping Sodbury, Wick.

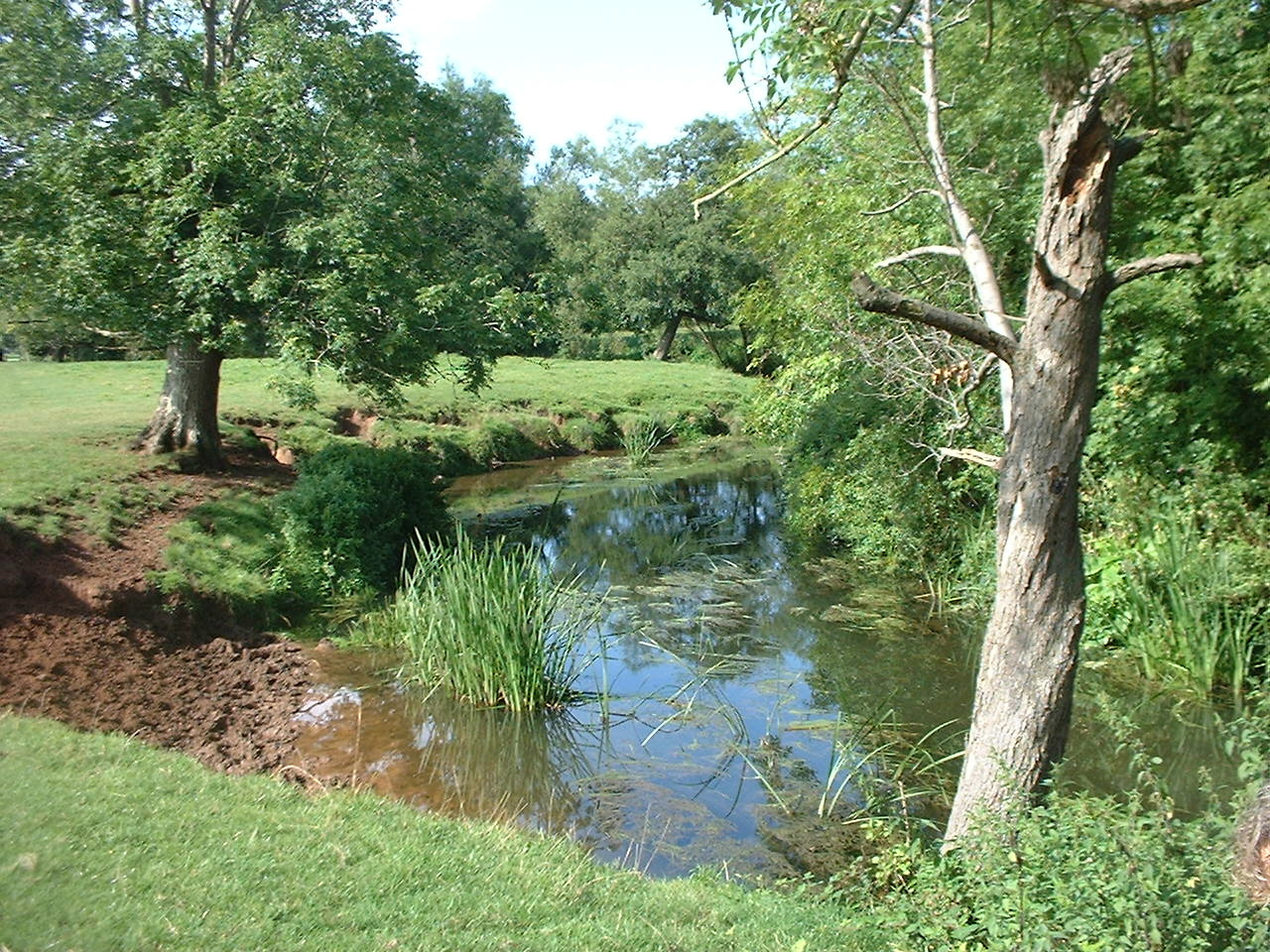
River Chew

The Monarch's Way enters Somerset, having crossed the River Avon at Keynsham, where it diverts from the route taken by Charles II into Bristol and instead runs alongside the River Chew, where it shares the route with the Two Rivers Way, through the Chew Valley to Chewton Keynsham, Compton Dando and Woollard. It then crosses the river at Pensford and turns north to Norton Malreward, skirting the prehistoric henge monument of Stanton Drew stone circles, the second largest stone circle in Britain, and travels along Dundry Down to the village of Dundry. From Dundry there is a northerly loop to Leigh Court at Abbots Leigh where Charles II stayed on the night of 12 September 1651. The path then returns to Dundry and heads turns south to Winford and passes Regil before passing between Chew Valley Lake and Blagdon Lake to Compton Martin, where it climbs up into the Mendip Hills Area of Outstanding Natural Beauty, passing East Harptree before entering the Forestry Commission plantation Stock Hill. On leaving the woods the path skirts the Priddy Mineries and Priddy Pools Site of Special Scientific Interest and continues south to Wookey Hole before entering the city of Wells, where it passes the Cathedral and Bishop's Palace.

South of Wells the Monarch's Way crosses the River Sheppey and passes through Twinhills Woods and Meadows before entering North Wootton, continuing across the Somerset Levels and the A361 and A37 roads, through East Pennard, to Hornblotton. It then crosses the River Alham and travels east crossing the River Brue and the A371 before entering Castle Cary.

South Cadbury, Trent, Dorset

The King was sheltered by Colonel Wyndham at Trent Manor House. The next part of the journey leads down to the Dorset coast where a ship had been found to take the King to France. At Montacute the Monarch's Way passes in front of the Grade I listed Abbey Farmhouse, which incorporates the gateway of the medieval Montacute Priory.

Ham Hill, Crewkerne, Drimpton, Hawkchurch, Charmouth The King stayed overnight on 22 September 1651 at the Queen's Armes before taking passage; the plan fell through and the King beat a hasty retreat inland, returning to Trent.

=== Charmouth to Shoreham (225 mi, 360 km) ===
From Charmouth the Monarch's Way follows the South West Coast Path east along the Jurassic Coast of Dorset past St Gabriel's Mouth, over Golden Cap, the highest point on the south coast, through Seatown, over Thorncombe Beacon and past Eype's Mouth to West Bay. From here it heads north up the River Brit to Bridport, swinging west and north to Pilsdon Pen, briefly joining the Wessex Ridgeway eastwards before reaching Broadwindsor. The King hid overnight in the George Inn, Broadwindsor on 23 September 1651.

From here it continues eastwards to the north of Beaminster, before zig-zagging north and east to Winyard's Gap near Chedington, where it meets the head of the River Parrett Trail. Continuing north the path enters Somerset and passes Hardington Marsh, swinging east from Hardington Mandeville to East Coker and then north through Yeovil and Mudford.

Crossing the River Yeo and back into Dorset, the path returns like the King to Trent. The King stayed here before setting out for the south coast and exile in France.

Skirting north of Sherborne to Sandford Orcas then re-entering Somerset the path passes to the south of Corton Denham to Charlton Horethorne and South Cheriton, then north to pass under the A303 to Wincanton. From here it continues north-east to Penselwood.

After crossing the Stour Valley Way and River Stour, the path enters Wiltshire at Zeals. From here it crosses the A303 dual carriageway and passes Zeals House before reaching Mere, passing West Knoyle and climbing Cleeve Hill. Crossing the A350, the path continues east to Hindon, Berwick St. Leonard, Fonthill Bishop and through part of Grovely Wood to reach Great Wishford. Here it crosses the River Wylye to Stoford before heading north and east near Stapleford to cross the A360, dropping down into the valley of the Avon at Middle Woodford before crossing at Lower Woodford. Traversing the country to the north of Salisbury, the path next crosses the A345 and the River Bourne at Winterbourne Dauntsey. After passing Figsbury Ring the path crosses the A30, to follow the course of the former Roman road from Winchester to Old Sarum. As it approaches Middle Winterslow, the path is joined by the Clarendon Way, the two paths following the Roman road over the county boundary.

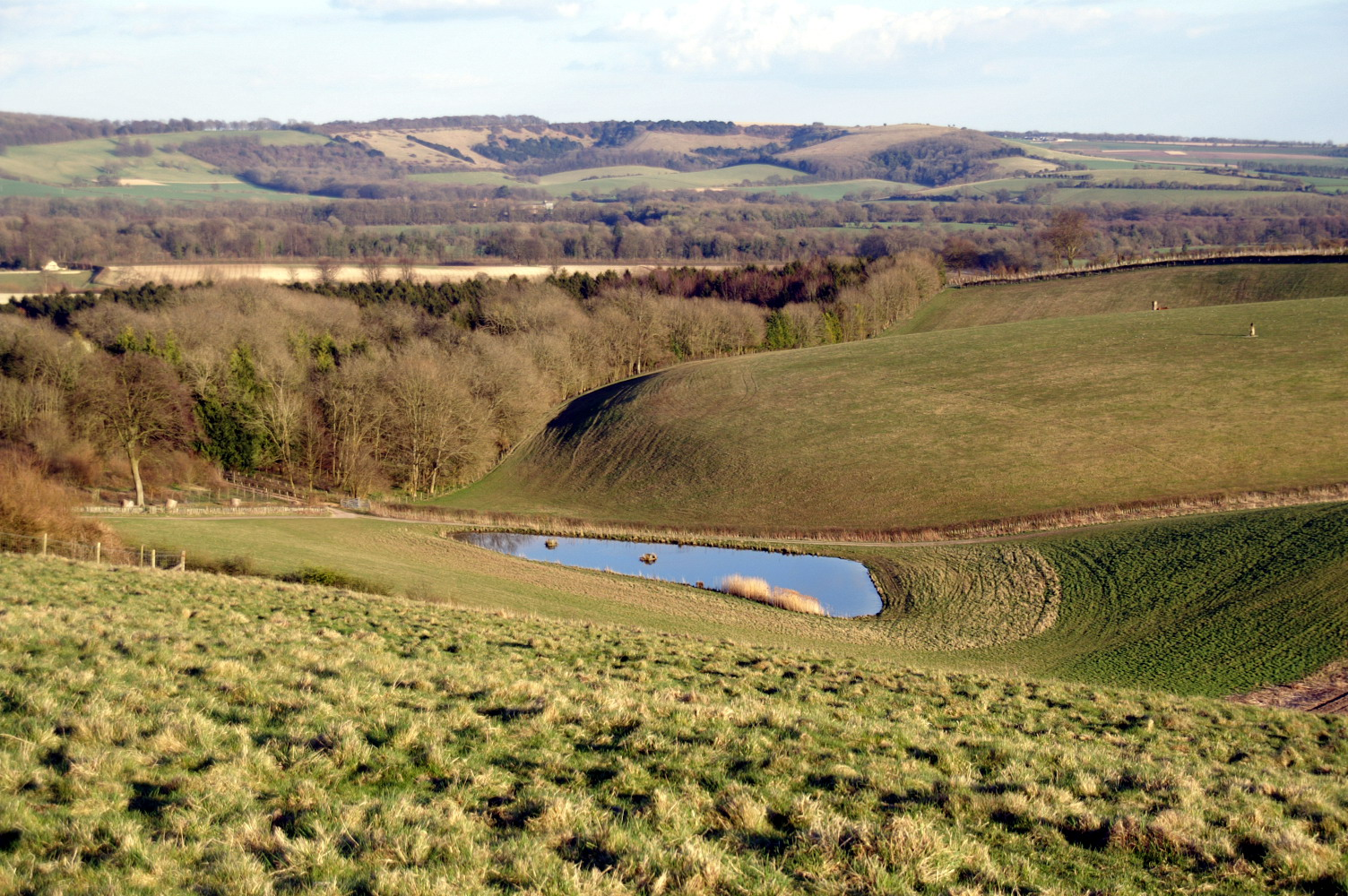
View from the Monarch's Way on the flank of Beacon Hill across the Meon Valley towards Old Winchester Hill

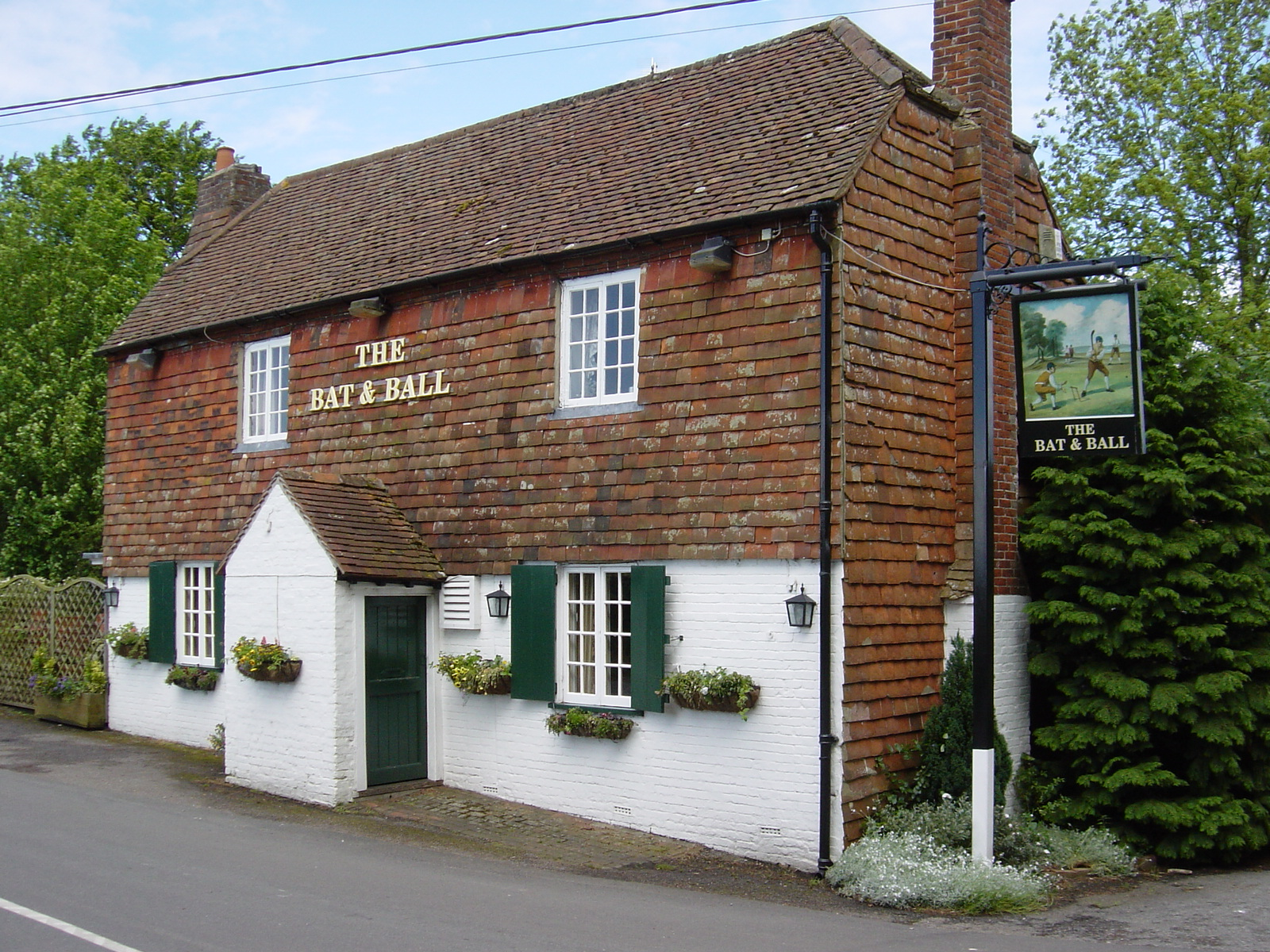
The Bat and Ball Inn at Broadhalfpenny Down

Entering Hampshire, the Monarch's Way and Clarendon Way continue to run together over the chalk through Broughton, crossing the River Test at Houghton. East of the Test the Clarendon Way continues east towards King's Somborne, whilst the Monarch's Way joins the Test Way, heading south down the Test Valley along the bed of the former Sprat and Winkle Line past Horsebridge. The two paths re-cross the Test to Mottisfont, heading south to cross the River Dun at Kimbridge, where the Test Way continues south and the Monarch's Way heads east to cross the Test again to the Bear & Ragged Staff and climbs to Michelmersh. From here eastwards for many miles the route skirts the northern rim of the Tertiary sediments of the Hampshire Basin, alternating between chalk downs to the north and heaths and woodland to the south. From Braishfield, the route crosses the wet clay of Ampfield Wood, passing through the hamlet of Knapp to the north of Ampfield, before heading for Hursley. The path continues east through the hamlets of Bunstead and Silkstead, passing under the M3 and passing the station at Shawford. Here the path crosses the Itchen Way before crossing the River Itchen to Twyford. West of Twyford the path crosses more chalk downs, now part of the South Downs, to Owslebury, before using short sections of Roman road in places to reach Upham. East of Upham the path heads northward for some miles, before joining the South Downs Way (and briefly the Wayfarers Walk) heading east. At Beacon Hill, the Monarch's Way takes a route north of the hill to Warnford, whilst the South Downs Way splits into alternative routes to Warnford or Exton. After crossing the River Meon and A32 the two routes rejoin further east before climbing Old Winchester Hill. To the east the routes diverge, with the South Downs Way continuing eastwards and the Monarch's Way heading south to the Bat & Ball Inn, Clanfield, then west past Broadhalfpenny Down towards Hambledon, before again striking east to Horndean. After crossing the town and A3(M), the path crosses The Holt to Rowland's Castle, where it passes the station.

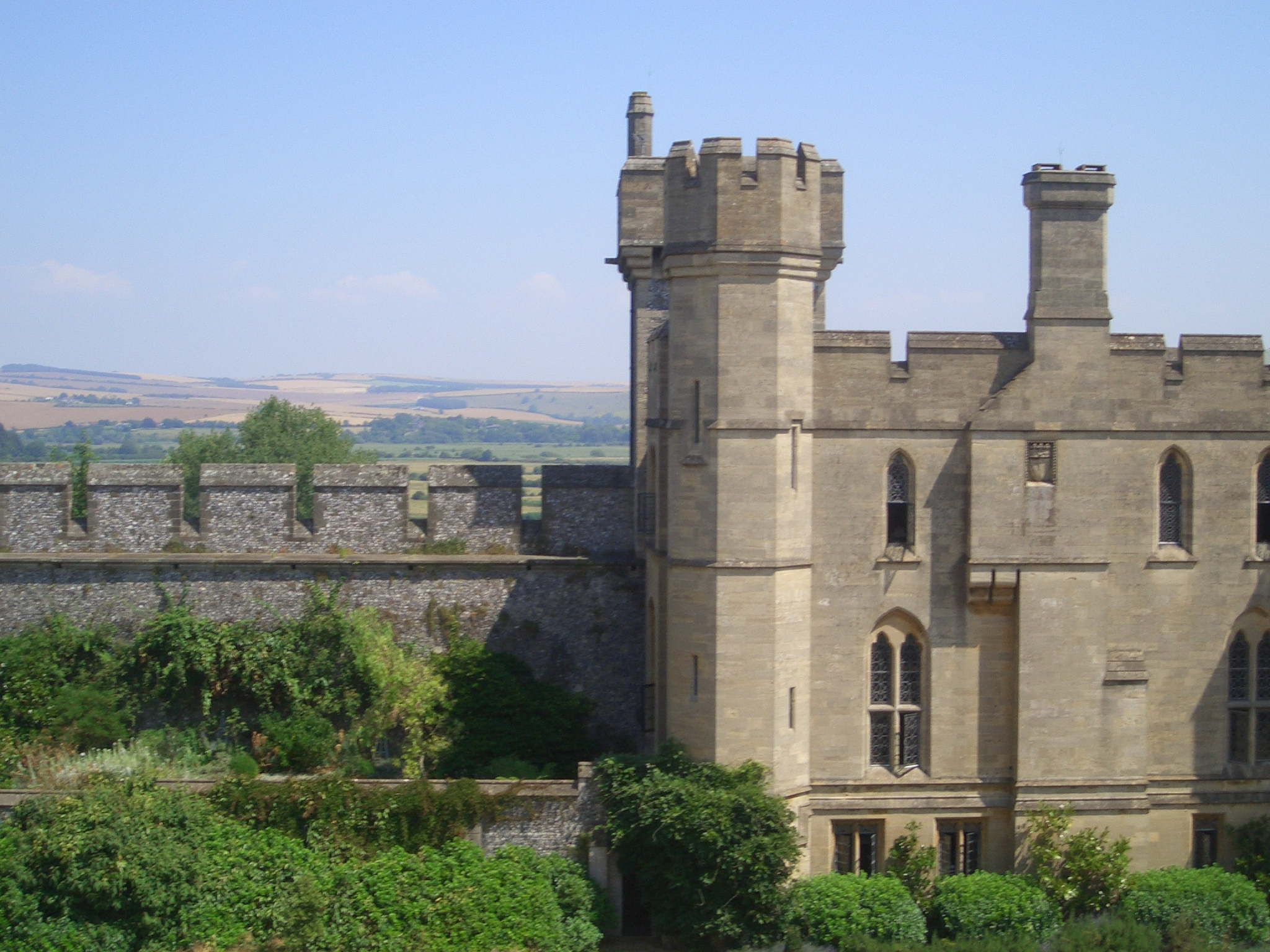
Arundel Castle in West Sussex

Entering West Sussex with the Sussex Border Path at Stansted Park, the Monarch's Way passes through Walderton and Stoughton, crossing Stoughton Down to West Dean. Here it crosses the A286 and River Lavant before climbing to the Trundle, on top of St Roche's Hill. Continuing east along a ridge the path passes Goodwood Racecourse and Goodwood Country Park. East of Goodwood the route diverts briefly north towards East Dean before heading south-east to Eartham. Here the path heads north-east along a section of Stane Street through Eartham Wood, before passing through the Neolithic camp below Glatting Beacon and heading east down to the River Arun at Houghton. Remaining west of the river past South Stoke, it heads south through the park of Arundel Castle to the town of Arundel, where it crosses the Arun to Warningcamp. From here it continues east across the parish of Patching to Findon, passing near Cissbury Ring and climbing to meet the South Downs Way above Steyning for a short distance. Passing to the south of Steyning it crosses the River Adur at Bramber to Upper Beeding. After crossing Beeding Hill and Thundersbarrow Hill the path approaches the northern edge of the built-up area near Mile Oak, before doubling sharply back to the north of the A27 to continue east across the downs, before heading south down the former route of the Devil's Dyke railway towards West Blatchington. Crossing the built-up area south-eastwards towards Hove, it crosses Hove Park near Brighton & Hove Greyhound Stadium, before zig-zagging through the streets of Brighton to Brighton Pier. From here it runs westwards along the sea-front through Hove and Portslade, to Shoreham-by-Sea.

== See also ==
- Escape of Charles II
- Long-distance footpaths in the UK
