= Knowle Hill =

Hill in Somerset, England

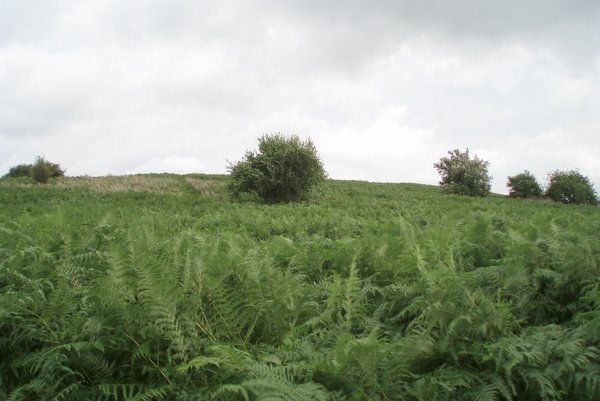

Highest point
- Elevation: 112 m (367 ft)
- Coordinates: 51°20′59″N 2°35′54″W

Geography
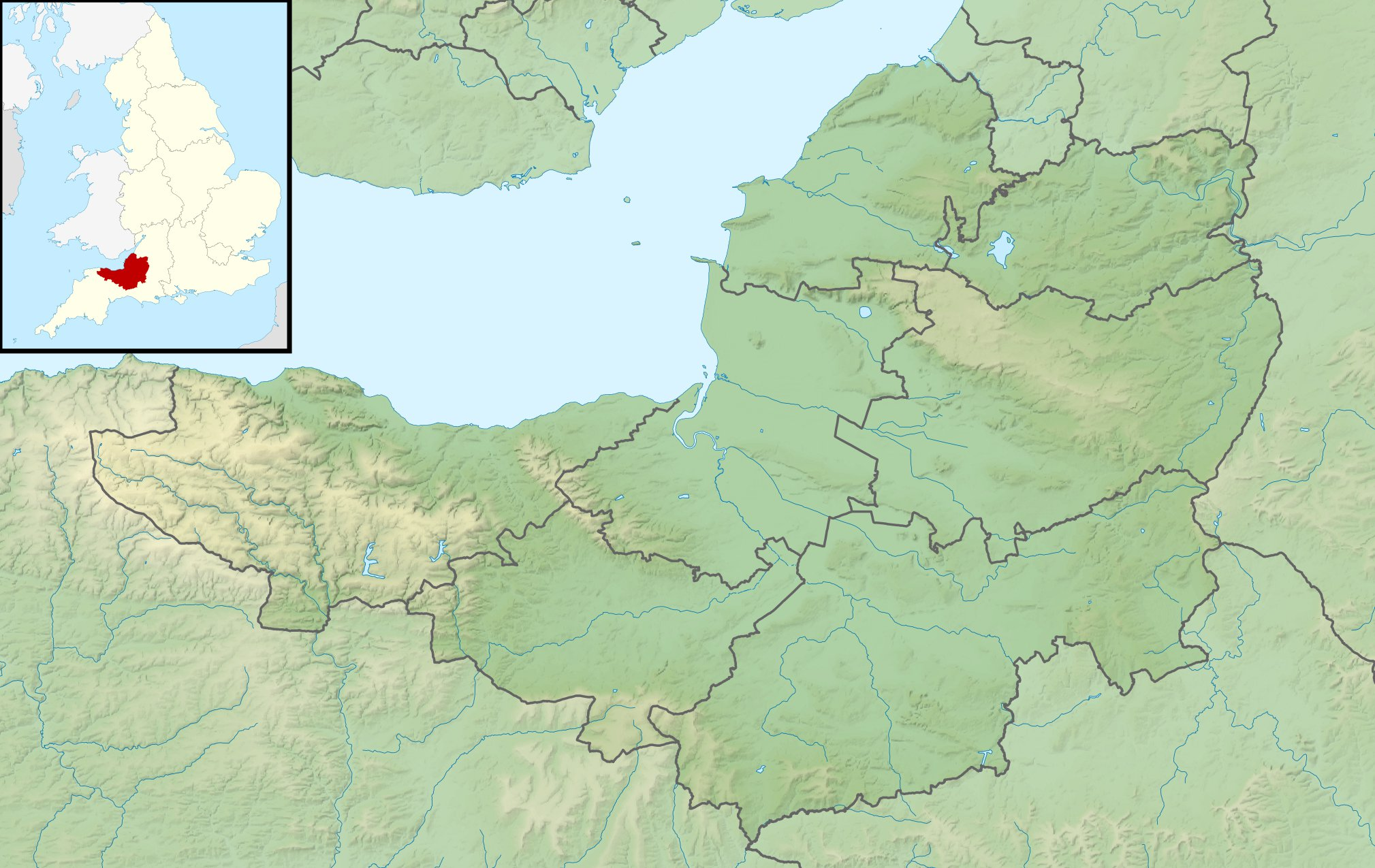
- Location within Somerset
- Location: Chew Valley, Somerset, England
- OS grid: ST584613

Knowle Hill (grid reference ST583613) is a hill in the Chew Valley, Somerset, England situated between the village of Chew Magna and Chew Valley Lake.

The south side of the summit of Knowle Hill is home to the grass Wood Small-reed (Calamagrostis epigejos). The population of this plant forms a circular patch some 20 metres wide, which is visible from Bishop Sutton 1.2 km south across Hollow Brook. It has been suggested that this patch is a single clone which has spread by means of underground rhizomes, and may be 200 years old.

The hill is declared open access land under the Countryside and Rights of Way Act 2000 and is on the route of the Chew Valley Three Peaks walk, and the Two Rivers Way.
