= Church of St Mary, Compton Dando =

Church in Somerset, England

Church of St Mary
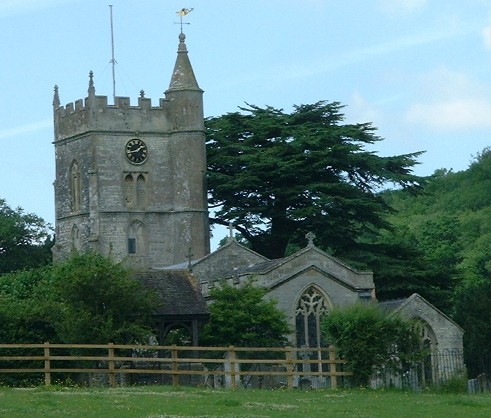

- Location within Somerset
- 51°22′47″N 2°30′38″W
- Location: Compton Dando, Somerset, England

History
- Built: 14th century

Listed Building – Grade II*
- Designated: 1 February 1956
- Reference no.: 1320443

== Location ==
The Anglican Church of St Mary in Compton Dando within the English county of Somerset dates from the 14th century. It is a Grade II* listed building.

== History and features ==
The Gothic style church was originally built in the 14th century, but has been revised several times. It has a west three stage square tower supported by diagonal buttresses. There is a peal of six bells in the tower.

There is a date of 1735 in the chancel, which is probably from one of the revisions, however most of the current fabric is from a Victorian restoration.

Inside the church is a piscina. The font and pulpit are from 1833.

The churchyard contains a sundial.

The parish is part of the benefice of Publow with Pensford, Compton Dando and Chelwood within the Diocese of Bath and Wells.

== In popular culture ==
The church and churchyard are also the scene for the fourth series of the ITV Bath-set crime drama McDonald & Dodds.

== See also ==
- List of ecclesiastical parishes in the Diocese of Bath and Wells
