= Chewton Keynsham =

Hamlet in Somerset, England

Coordinates: 51.3955°N 2.4995°W

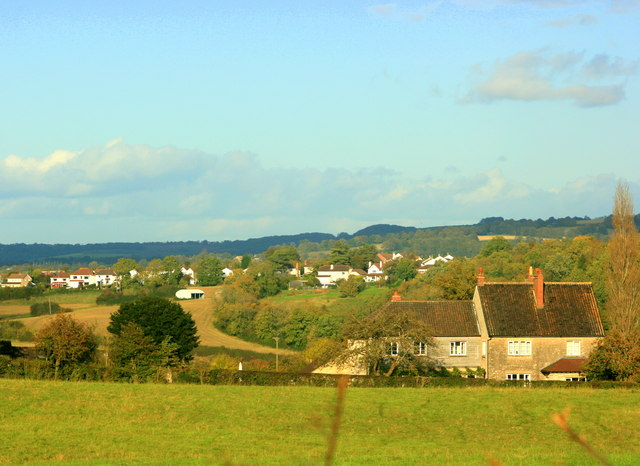
- North from Fairy Hill, looking toward Chewton Keynsham and Keynsham

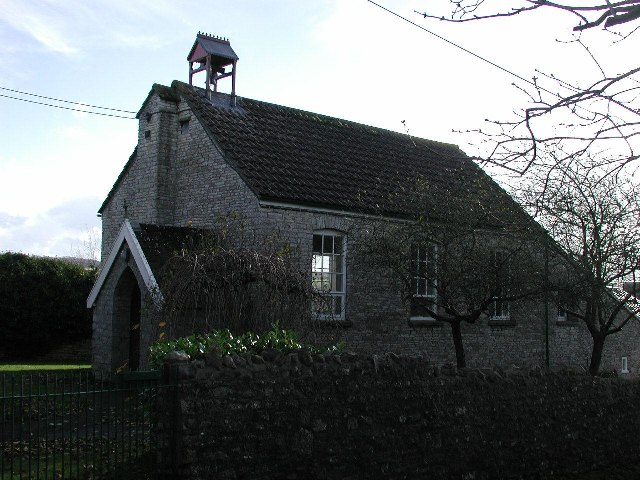
- Mission Church

- Location within Somerset
- Population: approx. 100
- OS grid reference: ST652664
- Civil parish: Compton Dando
- Unitary authority: Bath and North East Somerset
- Ceremonial county: Somerset
- Region: South West
- Country: England
- Sovereign state: United Kingdom
- Post town: BRISTOL
- Postcode district: BS39
- Dialling code: 01761
- Police: Avon and Somerset
- Fire: Avon
- Ambulance: South Western
- UK Parliament: North East Somerset and Hanham

Chewton Keynsham (grid reference ST652664) is a hamlet on the River Chew in the Chew Valley, Somerset, England. It is 7 miles from Bristol, 7 miles from Bath, and 2 miles (3.2 km) south of the centre of the town of Keynsham.

The hamlet lies on the Monarch's Way long-distance footpath.

== Government and politics ==
Chewton Keynsham is part of the Saltford Ward which is represented by two councillors on the Bath and North East Somerset unitary authority which has wider responsibilities for services such as education, refuse, tourism etc. The village is also served by Compron Dando Parish Council. The village is a part of the North East Somerset and Hanham constituency. Prior to Brexit in 2020, it was part of the South West England constituency of the European Parliament.

== Demographics ==
According to the 2011 census, the E00072685 output area (which extended from Queen Charlton to Burnett, both with higher populations), had 286 residents of which 40 were children, living in 117 households. Of these 242 described their health as 'good' or 'very good', 32 adults had no qualifications; 1 person was unemployed, whereas 77 were economically inactive, which includes carers, 18 students and 44 retirees.

== Geography ==
The settlement is linear with outlying farms on the valley slopes and has an 18th-century bridge crossing the River Chew, which follows the course of the village street north–south. Farmland occupies most of the mixed clay and calciferous hillsides and semi-plateaus above, interspersed by small areas of ancient woodland and many hedgerows.

== Chewton Place ==
The large house known as Chewton Place is a Grade II listed building. It was built about 1762 for the Popham family and further extended c. 1786. It was extensively remodelled in 1860–70 and restored in 1968 after flood damage. The house was fully renovated between 2013 and 2017. The building contains a number of historic features including a fine plaster ceiling from the late 19th century and a Gothic staircase.

A folly tower, known locally as the Owl Tower, was built in the grounds in the late 18th century — a tall tapering square obelisk of coursed limestone, finished with a pyramidal cap. It has pointed-arched openings, east and west, giving a walk-through passage at the base, and diagonal buttresses. The carved owl on a keystone probably gives the folly, which is Grade II listed, its name. The gardens were laid out in the 18th century and include a ha-ha and riverside walks. The bridge next to the entrance lodge is also listed. The Lodge itself is an 18th-century building but remodelled in the Gothic style at the same time as the main house was altered in the 1860s.

In 1963, the house was purchased by Imperial Tobacco as its HQ and Training Centre. From 1963 until 2013 the estate was run for commercial use. In December 2011, Aspire Venues - who had operated events at the venue - ceased trading. A subsequent staff-led effort to rescue the venue were stopped by property owner Longcap Developments.

Chewton Place has since been returned to its original use as a private residence.

== See also ==
- Chewton Mendip, upriver, also in Somerset
- Chewton, Victoria, Australia
