= Goodwood Country Park =

Country park in West Sussex, England

Coordinates: 50°53′38.57″N 0°43′43.33″W

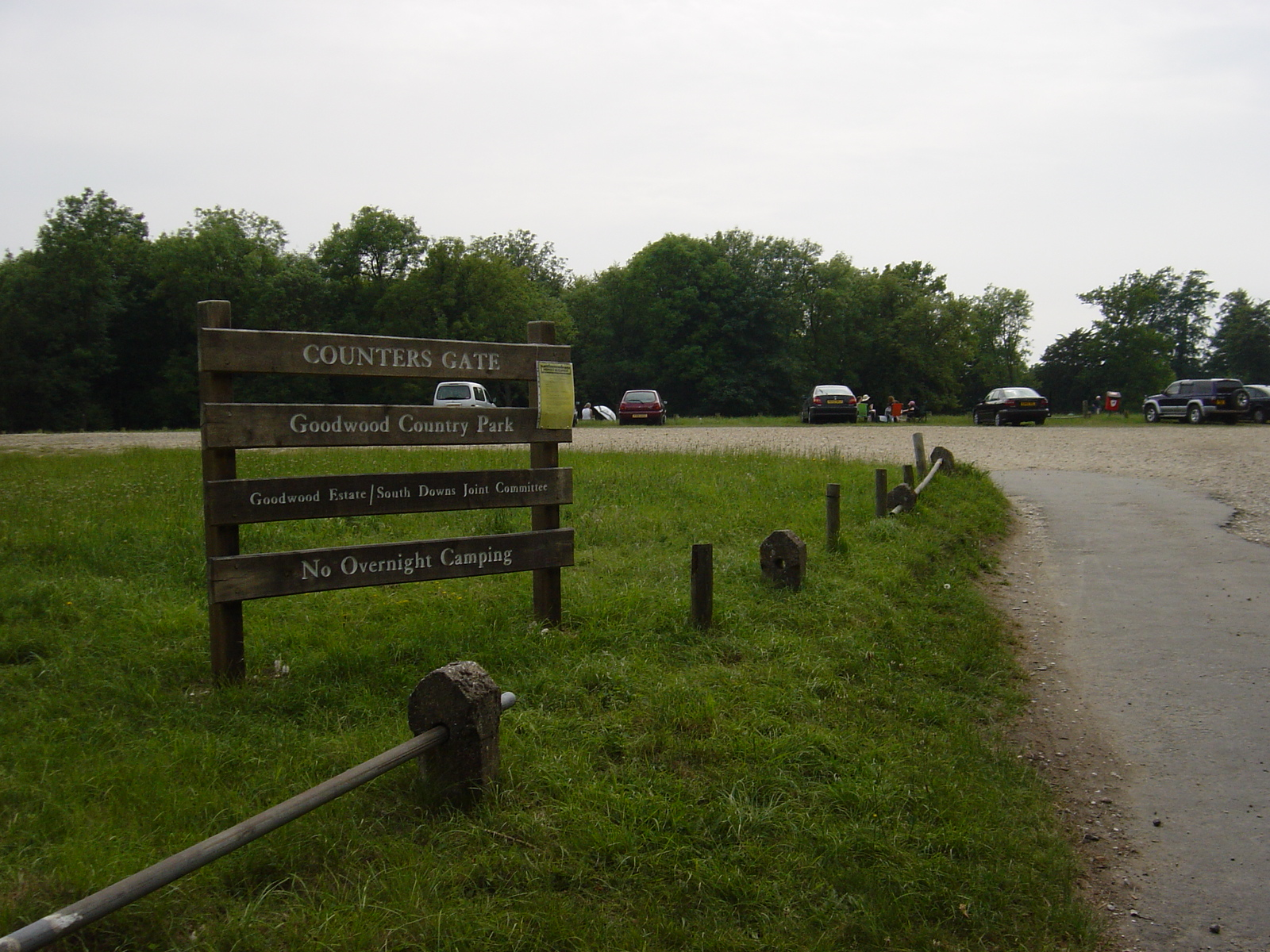
Goodwood Country Park Sign

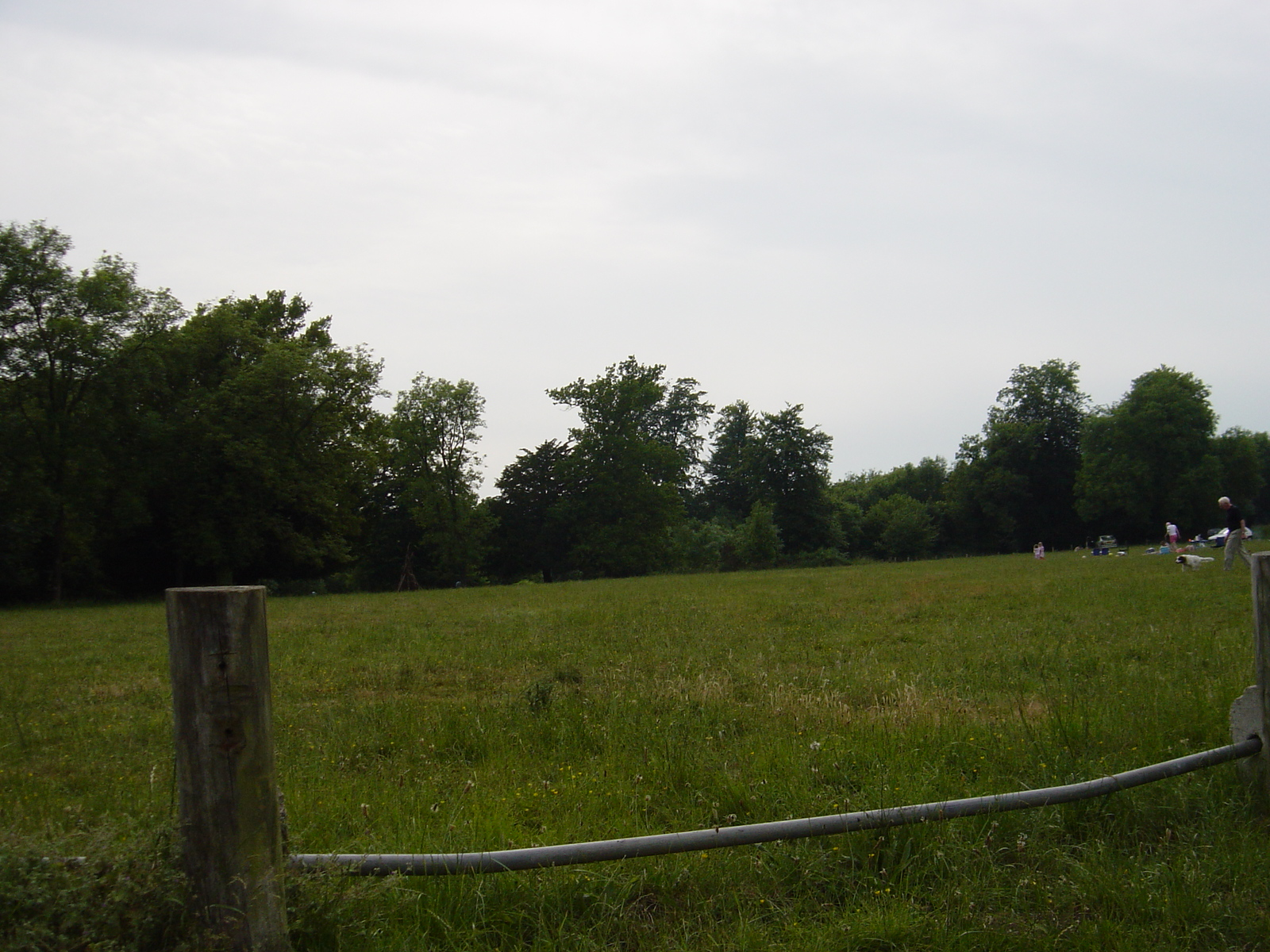
Goodwood Country Park grass area

Goodwood Country Park is a Country Park in West Sussex in southern England. It is within the estate of Goodwood House near Chichester, and next to Goodwood Racecourse and the Trundle Iron Age hill fort.

It is mostly woodland, with some open grassland space, with picnic area near the car park. There are a number of walks. The park is crossed by the Monarch's Way long-distance footpath.
