= Twinhills Woods and Meadows =

Biological site of special scientific interest

- Site of Special Scientific Interest
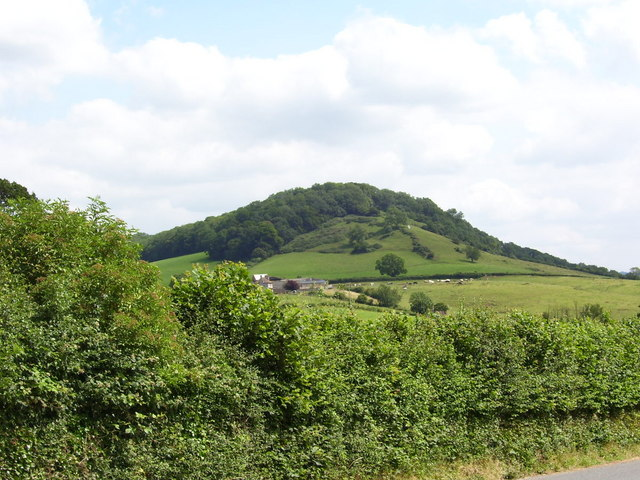

- Location within Somerset
- Location of Twinhills Woods and Meadows.
- Area of search: Somerset
- Grid reference: ST558432
- Coordinates: 51.18631°N 2.63380°W
- Interest: Biological
- Area: 21.2 hectares (0.212 km^{2}; 0.082 sq mi)
- Notification date: 1990

Twinhills Woods and Meadows (grid reference ST558432) is a 21.2 hectare (52.4 acre) biological Site of Special Scientific Interest on the Monarch's Way south of Dulcote in Somerset, notified in 1990.

Twinhills Woods and Meadows comprise a complex of ancient, semi-natural woodland, neutral and calcareous grassland with associated mature hedges and areas of shrub growth. Further interest is added by the presence of numerous butterfly species on the site. A total of 26 species have been recorded including grizzled skipper (Pyrgus malvae), white-letter hairstreak (Satyrium w-album), green-veined white (Pieris napi), brown argus (Aricia agestis), marbled white (Melangargia galthea), silver-washed fritillary (Argynnis paphia) and marsh fritillary (Eurodryas aurinia).

The site is crossed by the Monarch's Way long-distance footpath.
