= Two Rivers Way =

Long-distance footpath in Somerset, England

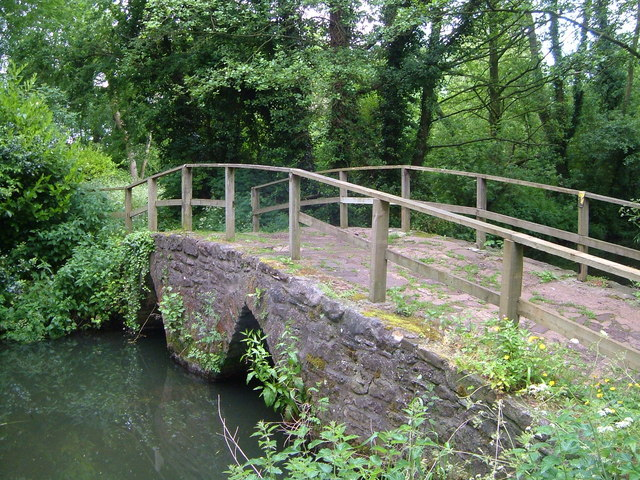
The Two Rivers Way crosses the River Chew at this bridge near Chew Magna

The Two Rivers Way is a 20-mile (32km) long-distance footpath through Somerset, England from Congresbury to Keynsham that follows the River Yeo and River Chew to the River Avon.

The footpath passes through the villages of Chew Stoke, Chew Magna and Compton Dando.
