= Compton Dando =

Village in Somerset, England

Coordinates: 51.3802°N 2.5065°W

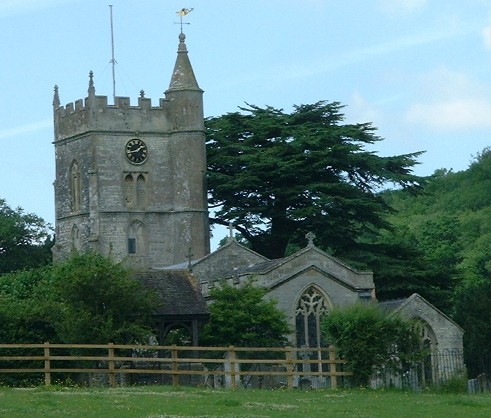
- Church of St Mary, Compton Dando

- Location within Somerset
- Population: 589 (2019)
- OS grid reference: ST647647
- Civil parish: Compton Dando
- Unitary authority: Bath and North East Somerset
- Ceremonial county: Somerset
- Region: South West
- Country: England
- Sovereign state: United Kingdom
- Post town: BRISTOL
- Postcode district: BS39
- Dialling code: 01761
- Police: Avon and Somerset
- Fire: Avon
- Ambulance: South Western
- UK Parliament: North East Somerset and Hanham

Compton Dando is a small village and civil parish on the River Chew in the affluent Chew Valley in England. It is in the Bath and North East Somerset council area and ceremonial county of Somerset, and lies 7 miles (11.3 km) from Bristol, 8 miles (12.9 km) from Bath, and 3 miles (4.8 km) from Keynsham.

The parish includes the villages of Burnett, Chewton Keynsham, Queen Charlton and Woollard, and has a population of 589.

== History ==
It is on the route of the ancient Wansdyke, and lies on the Monarch's Way long-distance footpath.

According to Robinson it is listed in the 1086 Domesday Book as Comtuna. A compton was originally a 'valley enclosure'. In 1297 the name Dando was added after Godfrey or Geofrey de Anno.

The parish of Compton Dando was part of the Keynsham Hundred, the village was held by Alexander de Alno in the 12th century.

== Governance ==
The parish council has responsibility for local issues, including setting an annual precept (local rate) to cover the council’s operating costs and producing annual accounts for public scrutiny. The parish council evaluates local planning applications and works with the local police, district council officers, and neighbourhood watch groups on matters of crime, security, and traffic. The parish council's role also includes initiating projects for the maintenance and repair of parish facilities, such as the village hall or community centre, playing fields and playgrounds, as well as consulting with the district council on the maintenance, repair, and improvement of highways, drainage, footpaths, public transport, and street cleaning. Conservation matters (including trees and listed buildings) and environmental issues are also of interest to the council.

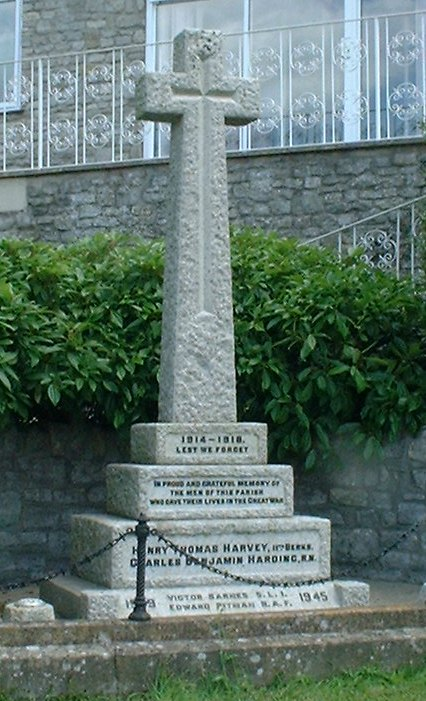
War Memorial in Compton Dando

Compton Dando is part of the Saltford Ward which is represented by two councillors on the unitary authority of Bath and North East Somerset which was created in 1996, as established by the Local Government Act 1992. It provides a single tier of local government with responsibility for almost all local government functions within its area including local planning and building control, local roads, council housing, environmental health, markets and fairs, refuse collection, recycling, cemeteries, crematoria, leisure services, parks, and tourism. They are also responsible for education, social services, libraries, main roads, public transport, trading standards, waste disposal and strategic planning, although fire, police and ambulance services are provided jointly with other authorities through the Avon Fire and Rescue Service, Avon and Somerset Constabulary and the Great Western Ambulance Service.

Bath and North East Somerset's area covers part of the ceremonial county of Somerset but it is administered independently of the non-metropolitan county. Its administrative headquarters is in Bath. Between 1 April 1974 and 1 April 1996, it was the Wansdyke district and the City of Bath of the county of Avon. Before 1974 that parts of the parish was part of the Bathavon Rural District and Keynsham Urban District.

The parish is represented in the House of Commons of the Parliament of the United Kingdom as part of North East Somerset and Hanham. It elects one Member of Parliament (MP) by the first past the post system of election. It was also part of the South West England constituency of the European Parliament, prior to Britain leaving the European Union in January 2020, which elected seven MEPs using the d'Hondt method of party-list proportional representation.

== Demographics ==
According to the 2001 Census the Farmborough Ward (which includes Woollard and Chewton Keynsham), had 1,111 residents, living in 428 households, with an average age of 44.5 years. Of these 71% of residents describing their health as 'good', 21% of 16- to 74-year-olds had no qualifications; and the area had an unemployment rate of 1.0% of all economically active people aged 16–74. In the Index of Multiple Deprivation 2004, it was ranked at 22,100 out of 32,482 wards in England, where 1 was the most deprived LSOA and 32,482 the least deprived.

== Church ==
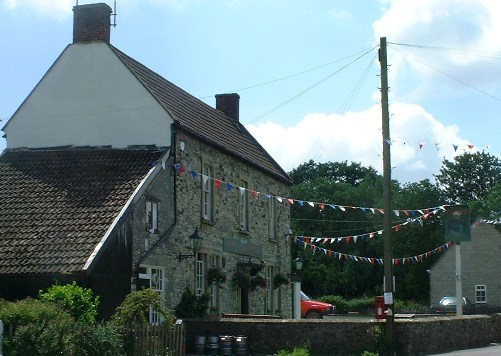
Compton Inn, Compton Dando

The Church of St Mary is a small edifice in the Gothic style, with a square tower. It has a date of 1735 on the chancel, but is mostly Victorian, although Wade and Wade in their 1929 book Somerset suggest “The church is of 14th-cent. workmanship, but the chancel and S. porch respectively bear the dates 1793 and 1735 (probably referring to repairs)”. It is a Grade II listed building. A church has existed on this site for over 800 years. The medieval tower at the Western end has a staircase, turret and six bells, the oldest of which dates to 1617. A strange weathervane tops the tower. It is a gilded dragon erected in 1757 and is known locally as The Dando Bird. A clock whose mechanism is dated in the early 1800s faces the village.

The church was substantially changed during the 1700s and 1800s. Inside the church is a Norman font, probably a replica, a memorial to the Branch Family dated 1732, and a large board dedicated to Jerome Harvey, a local benefactor, dated 1637. At the back of the Nave is a Norman ledger-stone found in the churchyard with an inscription ‘Roger the Norman lies here’. A board shows the list of Rectors beginning with Richard Cumin in 1198. The building comprises a Tower, a Nave, a Chancel which was enlarged in the early 1900s, a Vestry added in 1840, a North Aisle rebuilt in 1820, and the South Porch which has a date of 1793. The organ, from a chapel in Exeter Cathedral, was installed in the mid 1800s. There is a magnificent millennium cross carved by local craftsmen, and a great East Window based on a passage from the Book of Revelation which was installed in 1962. Until 1996, built into the buttress on the North East corner of the church was a pagan Roman Altar stone, which is now in the Roman Baths in the city of Bath. A display board in the church tells visitors all about it. Some mild reordering has taken place but the oak pews are still in place.

== Manor House ==
The 16th-century Manor House is a Grade II* listed building.

== Notable residents ==
The Hollywood actress Betta St John lived in Compton Dando from 1967 until 1975
