= River Chew =

River in Somerset, United Kingdom

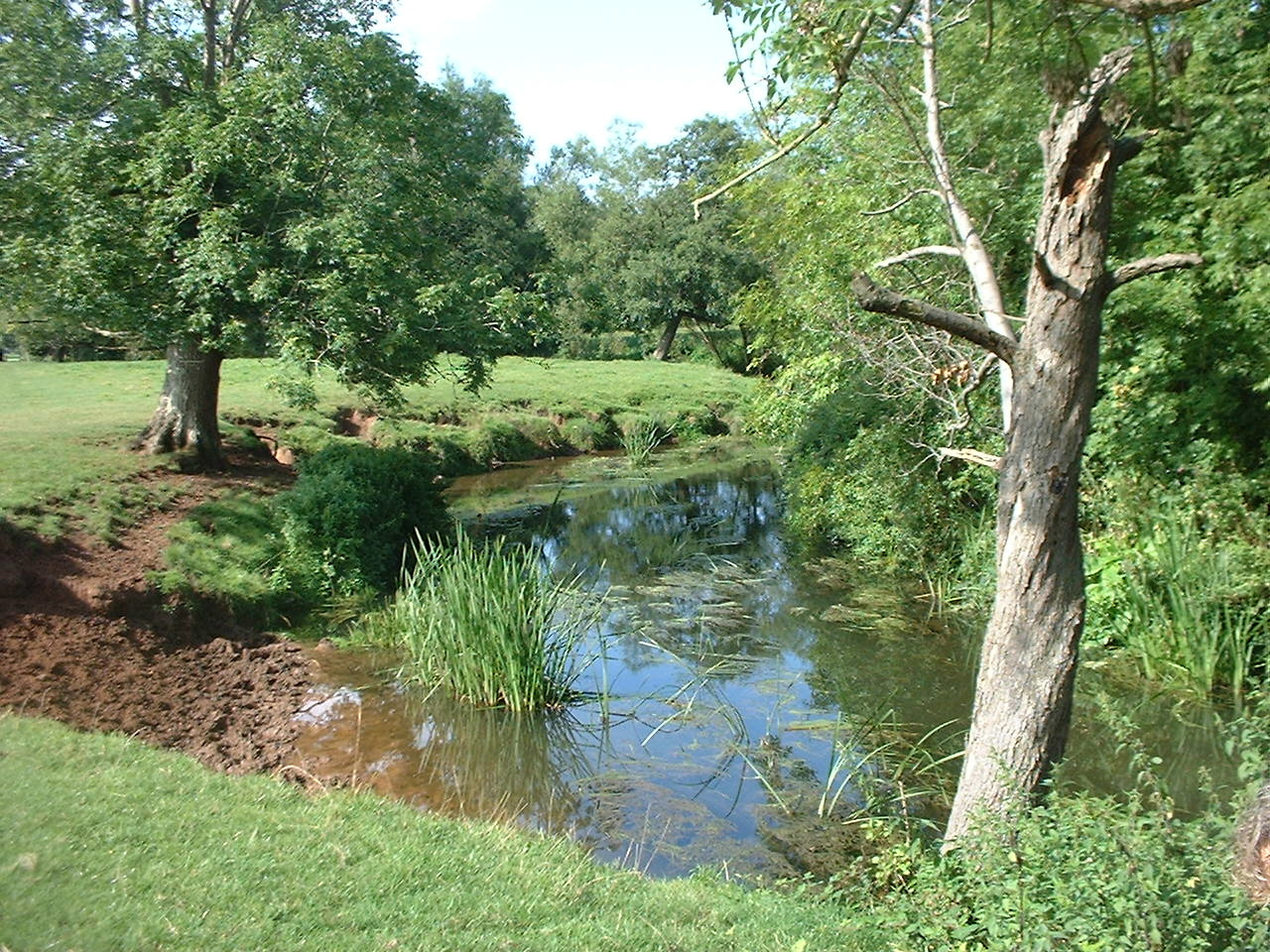
- River Chew between Stanton Drew and Pensford

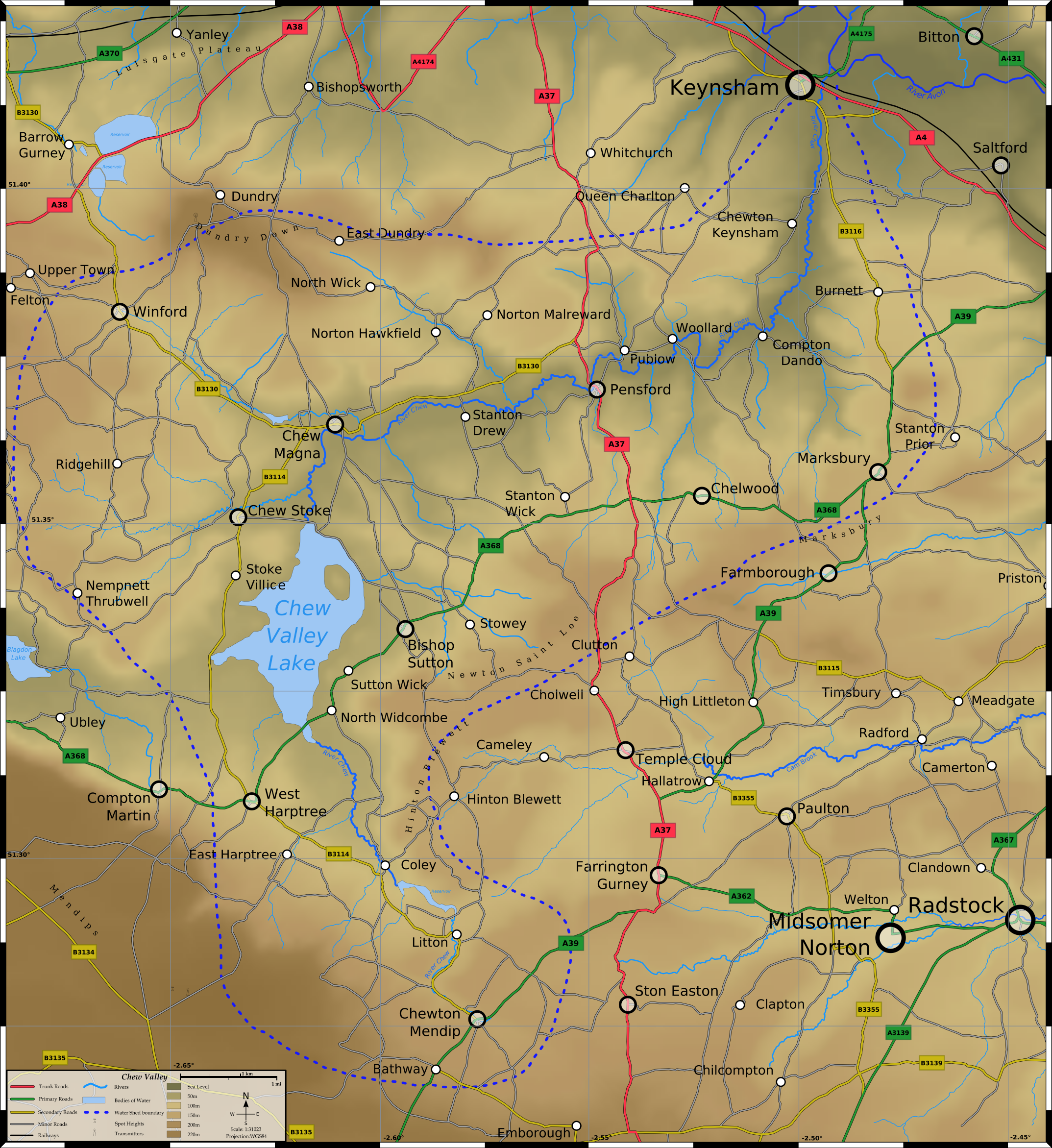
- Topographical map of the Chew Valley

Location
- Country: England
- County: Somerset
- District: Chew Valley

Physical characteristics
- Source: Chewton Mendip
  - location: Mendip Hills, Somerset, England
  - coordinates: 51°16′34″N 2°34′42″W
  - elevation: 305 m (1,001 ft)
- Mouth: River Avon, Bristol
  - location: Keynsham, Somerset, England
  - coordinates: 51°25′29″N 2°30′26″W
  - elevation: 10 m (33 ft)
- Length: 27 km (17 mi)
- Basin size: 145 km^{2} (56 sq mi)
- Discharge
  - location: Keynsham
  - average: 1.18 m^{3}/s (42 cu ft/s)
  - minimum: 0.5 m^{3}/s (18 cu ft/s)
  - maximum: 20 m^{3}/s (710 cu ft/s)

Basin features
- Tributaries
  - left: Strode Brook, Winford Brook

The River Chew is a small river in England that flows for some 17 miles (27 km) through the North Somerset countryside to form the Chew Valley before merging with the River Avon.

The spring from which the Chew rises is just upstream from Chewton Mendip. Strode Brook and Winford Brook are the main tributaries, both joining the Chew from the left. The river flows northwest from Chewton Mendip through Litton, Chew Valley Lake, Chew Stoke, Chew Magna, and Stanton Drew. The river passes under the A37 at Pensford; flows through the villages of Publow, Woollard, Compton Dando, and Chewton Keynsham; and joins the River Avon at Keynsham. The Two Rivers Way runs alongside the Chew for much of its distance, forming part of the Monarch's Way.

== The name "Chew" ==
The name "Chew" may have Celtic origins, cognate with the River Chwefru, cliwyf-ffrenwy, "the moving, gushing water"; ancient forms are Estoca (Chew Stoke), Chiu (Chew Magna), and Ciwetune (Chewton Mendip). Its exact meaning admits of several possible explanations, including "winding water", the ew being a variant of the French eau, "water". The word chewer is western dialect for "narrow passage" and chare is Old English for "turning."

Another theory is that the name derives from the Welsh cyw, "the young of an animal, or chicken", such that Afon Cyw would have meant "the river of the chickens".

Other possible explanations are it comes from the Old English word cēo ("fish gill"), used in the transferred sense of a ravine, in a similar way to Old Norse gil, or possibly a derogatory nickname from Middle English chowe, "chough", Old English cēo, a bird closely related to the crow and the jackdaw, notorious for its chattering and thieving. Still another suggestion is that the river is named after the Viking war god Tiw.

== Course ==
The current course of the river was likely established after the last ice age, before which the river had probably followed the course of the Congresbury Yeo to the Bristol Channel. Ice blocking the Bristol Channel would have diverted the Chew such that it flowed north rather than west through Compton Martin to join the Avon.

== Roman use ==
"Pigs" (ingots) of lead from the Charterhouse Roman Town on Mendip were brought to the river to be transported to Sea Mills on the Avon for shipment overseas.

== Flood of 1968 ==
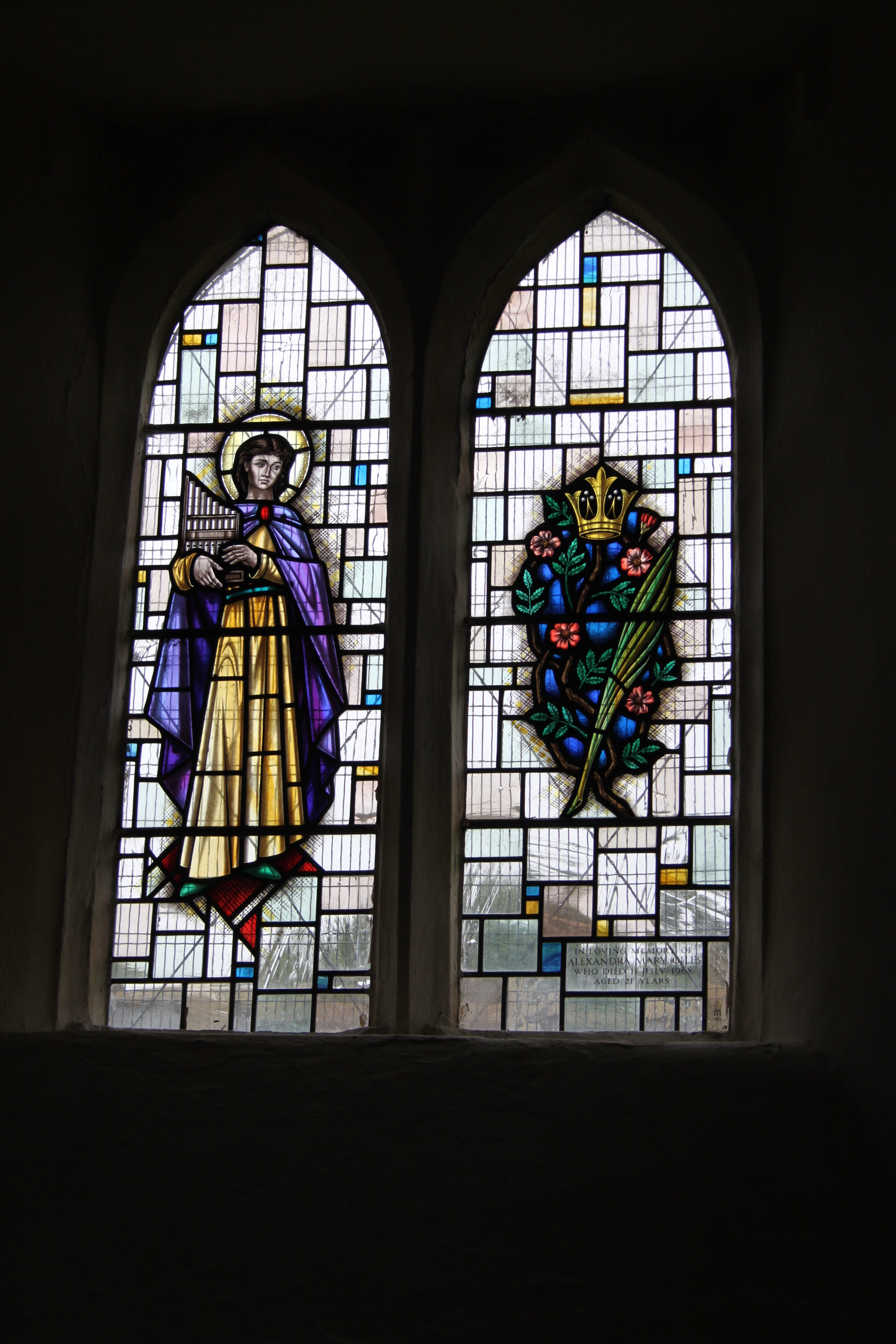
Memorial stained glass window in the Church of St Peter, Marksbury to a resident who died when the Pensford Bridge was swept away.

The Chew Stoke flood of 1968 caused serious damage to towns and villages along its path, sweeping away the bridge at Pensford.

== Fishing ==
Fish ladders have been installed at three weirs in Keynsham and Chewton Keynsham to allow fish to travel upstream. Fishing rights for the Millground and Chewton sections of the river are owned by Keynsham Angling Club. The Mill Ground stretch of the River Chew consists of the six left-bank fields (looking downstream) from Chewton Place at Chewton Keynsham to the Albert Mill, Keynsham. The water is home to numerous species of fish, including chub, roach, European perch, rudd, gudgeon, dace, grayling, trout, and eel.

== Gallery ==
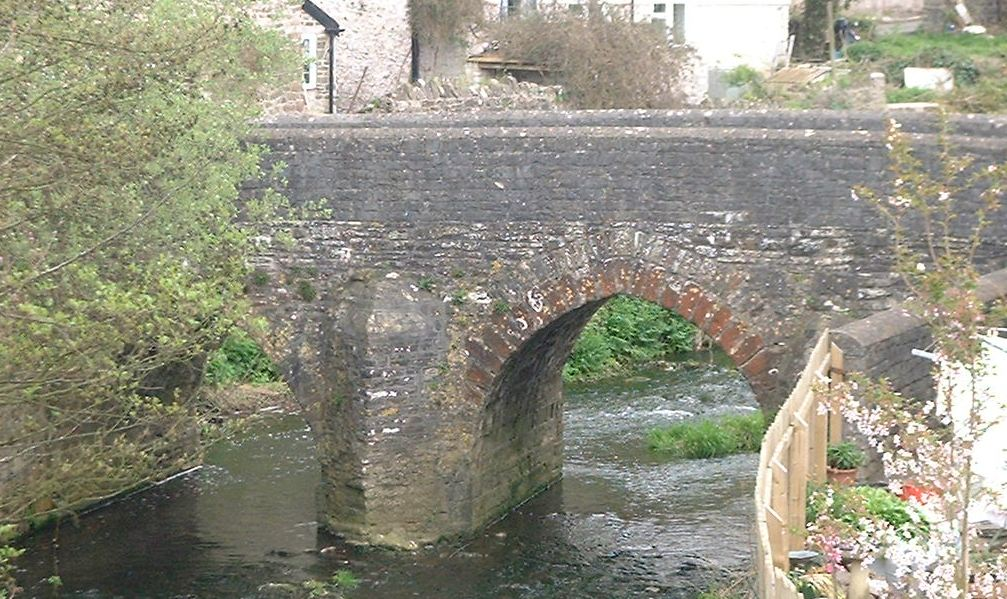
Bridge at Pensford.

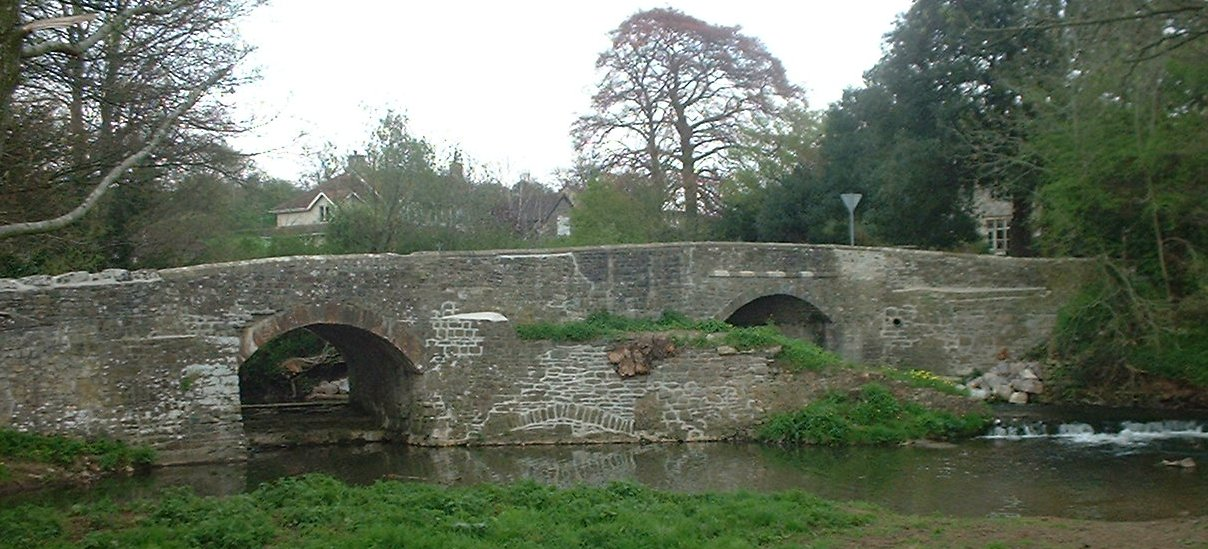
Bridge at Publow.

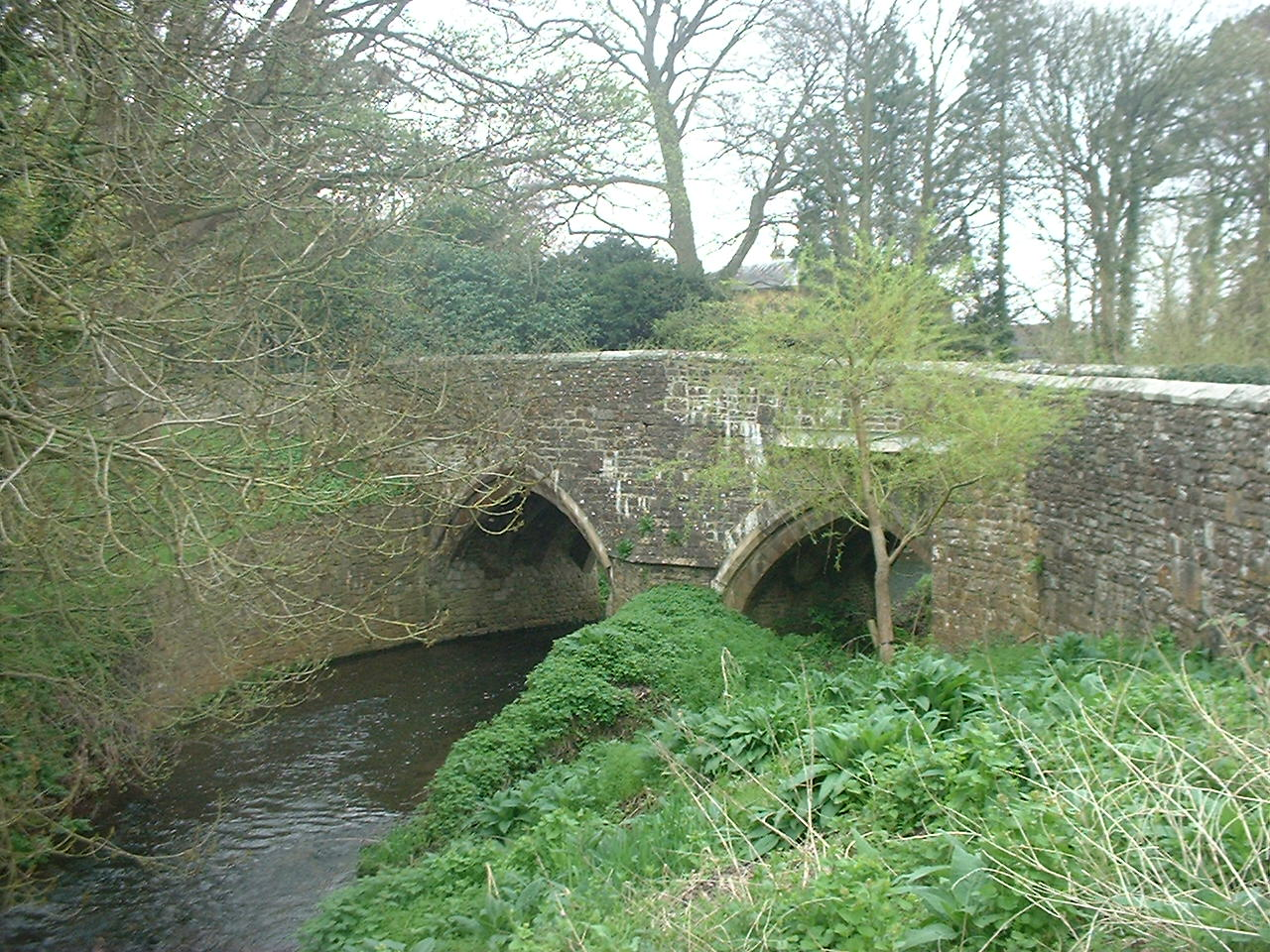
Bridge at Stanton Drew.
