= Chew Valley =

River valley in Somerset, England

Coordinates: 51.337421°N 2.615197°W

- Location within Somerset
- Area: 182 sq mi (470 km^{2})
- Population: 5,000
- OS grid reference: ST571600
- Unitary authority: Bath and North East Somerset; North Somerset; Somerset Council
- Ceremonial county: Somerset
- Region: South West
- Country: England
- Sovereign state: United Kingdom
- Post town: Bristol
- Postcode district: BS40
- Dialling code: 01275; 01761
- Police: Avon and Somerset
- Fire: Avon
- Ambulance: South Western
- UK Parliament: North East Somerset and Hanham

The Chew Valley is a river valley in north Somerset, England, named after the River Chew, which rises at Chewton Mendip, and joins the River Avon at Keynsham. Technically, the area of the valley is bounded by the water catchment area of the Chew and its tributaries; however, the name Chew Valley is often used less formally to cover other nearby areas, for example, Blagdon Lake and its environs, which by a stricter definition are part of the Yeo Valley. The valley is an area of rich arable and dairy farmland, interspersed with a number of villages.

The landscape consists of the valley of the River Chew and is generally low-lying and undulating. It is bounded by higher ground ranging from Dundry Down and the south western boundary of Keynsham town to the north, the Lulsgate Plateau to the west, the Mendip Hills to the south and the Hinton Blewett, Temple Cloud, Clutton and Marksbury plateau areas to the east. The valley's boundary generally follows the top of scarp slopes except at the southwestern and southeastern boundaries where flat upper areas of the Chew Valley grade gently into the Yeo Valley and eastern Mendip Hills respectively. The River Chew was dammed in the 1950s to create Chew Valley Lake, which provides drinking water for the nearby city of Bristol and surrounding areas. The lake is a prominent landscape feature of the valley, a focus for recreation, and is internationally recognised for its nature conservation interest, because of the bird species, plants and insects.

The area falls into the domains of councils including Bath and North East Somerset, North Somerset and Somerset Council. Part of the area falls within the Mendip Hills Area of Outstanding Natural Beauty. Most of the undeveloped area is within the Bristol/Bath Green Belt. Many of the villages date back to the time of the Domesday Book and there is evidence of human occupation since the Stone Age. There are hundreds of listed buildings with the churches being Grade I listed. The main commercial centre is Chew Magna.

== Etymology ==
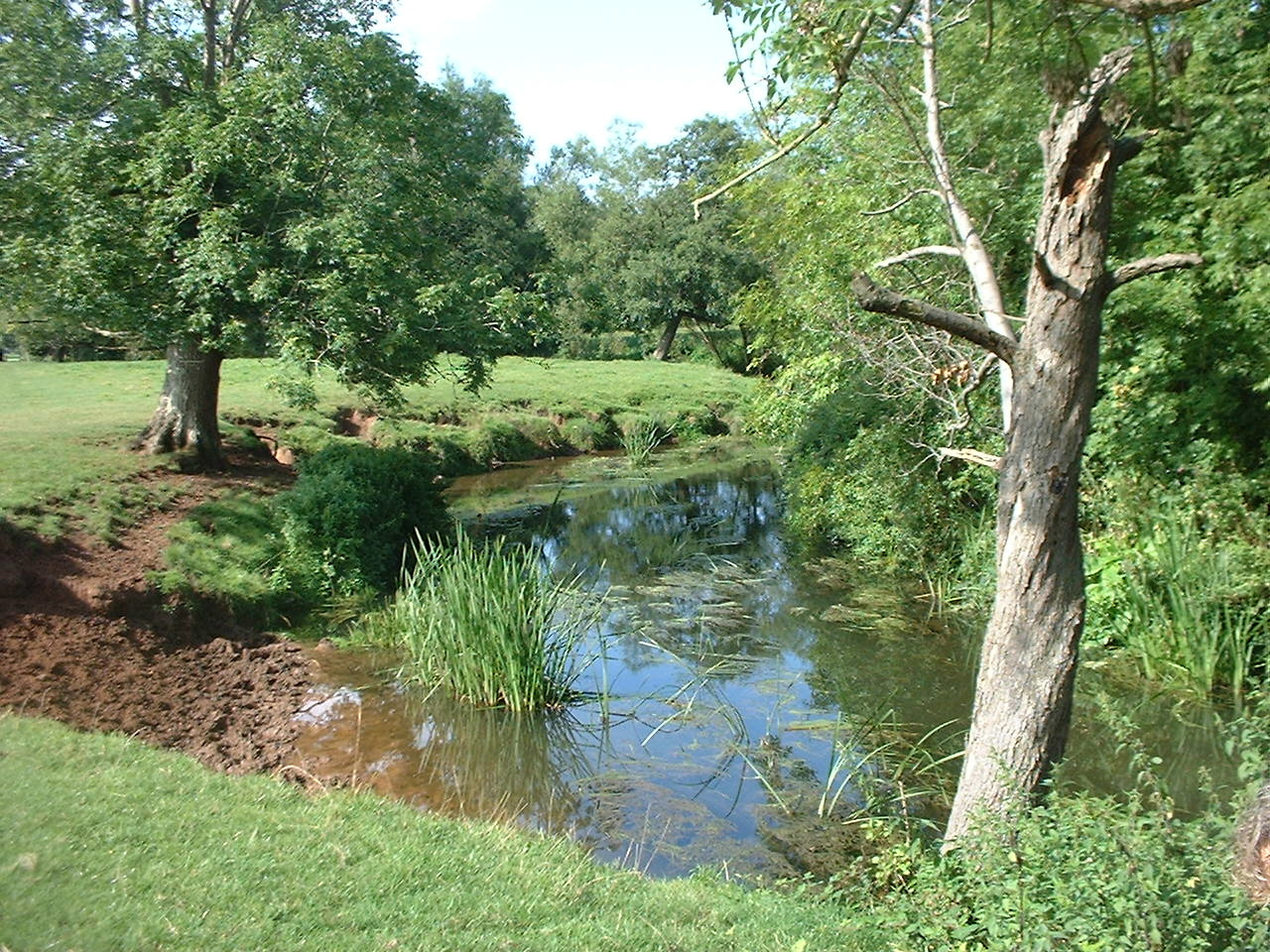
The River Chew between Stanton Drew and Pensford

There is no clear origin for the name "Chew", found scarcely anywhere else; however, there have been differing explanations of the etymology, including "winding water", the 'ew' being a variant of the French eau, meaning water. The word chewer is a western dialect for a narrow passage, and chare is Old English for turning. One explanation is that the name Chew began in Normandy as Cheux, and came to England with the Norman Conquest during the eleventh century. However, others agree with Ekwall's interpretation that it is derived from the Welsh cyw meaning "the young of an animal, or chicken", so that afon Cyw would have been "the river of the chickens". Other possible explanations suggest it comes from the Old English word ceo, 'fish gill'.

== Government and politics ==
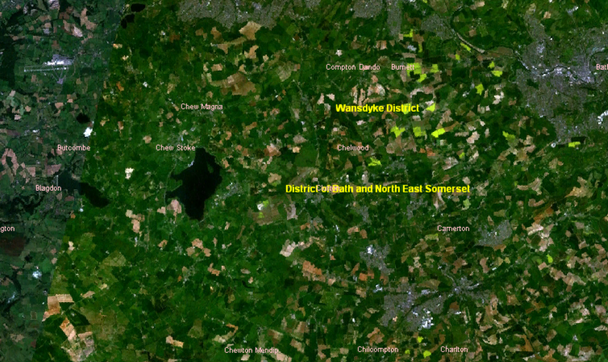
The Chew Valley area in a satellite image

The villages in the valley have their own parish councils which have responsibility for local issues. They also elect councillors to unitary authorities e.g. Bath & North East Somerset, North Somerset, and Somerset Councils, which have wider responsibilities for services such as education, refuse and tourism. The Bath & North East Somerset Council ward of Chew Valley is not contigious with the entire valley, but only the villages within the valley that fall under that authority.

Each of the villages is also part of a constituency, either North East Somerset and Hanham or North Somerset. Avon and Somerset Constabulary provides police services to the area.

== History ==
=== Geology ===
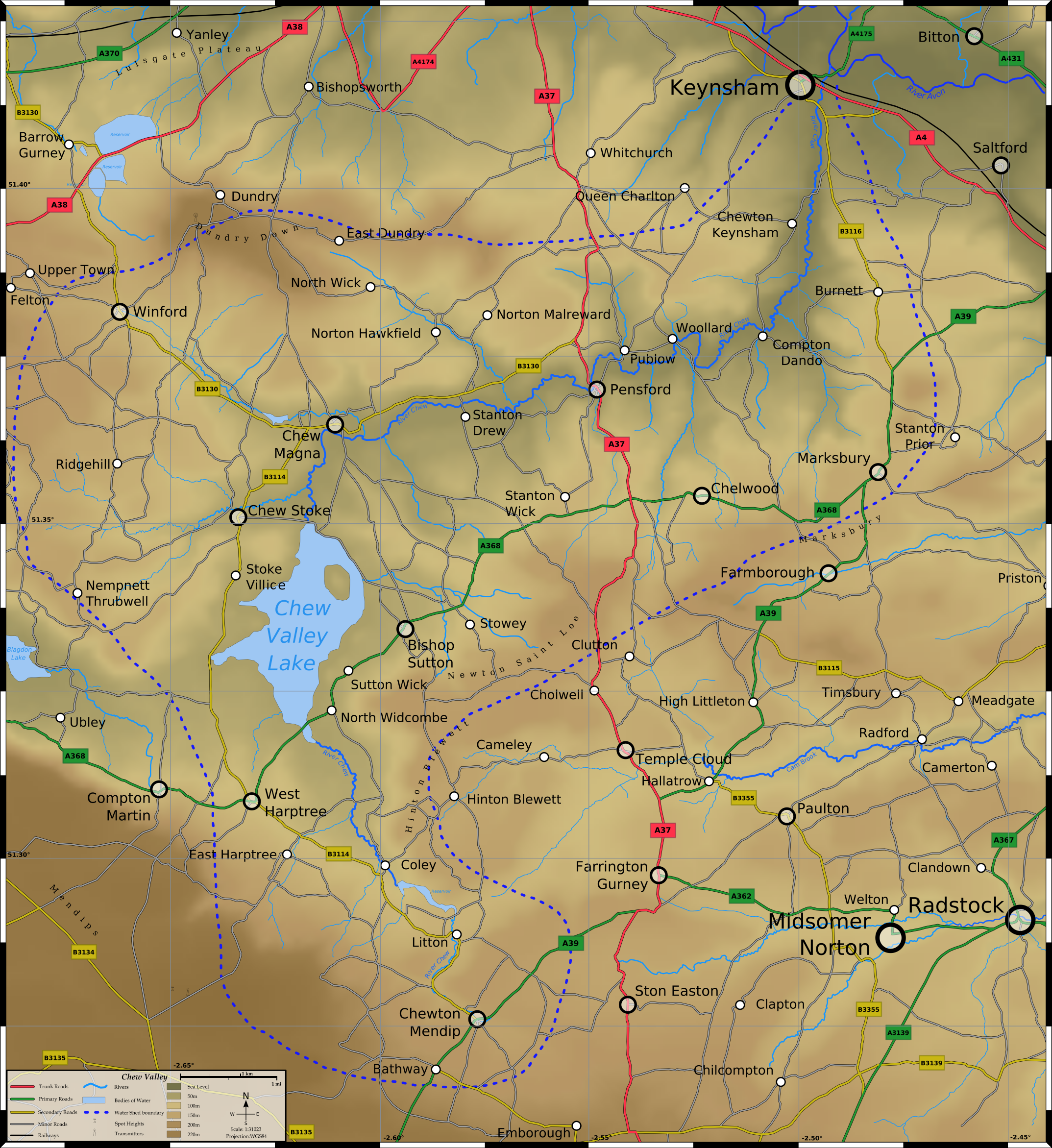
Topographical map of the Chew Valley

The western end of the area (around Nempnett Thrubwell) consists of the Harptree Beds which incorporate silicified clay, shale and Lias Limestone. Clifton Down Limestone, which includes calcite and dolomitic mudstones of the Carboniferous period, is found in the adjoining central band and dolomitic conglomerate of the Triassic period. There are two main soil types, both generally well-drained. The mudstones around the lakes give rise to fertile silty clay soils that are a dull dusky red colour because of their high iron content. The clay content means that where unimproved they easily become waterlogged when wet, and hard with cracks and fissures during dry periods. The main geological outcrops around the lake are mudstone, largely consisting of red Siltstone resulting in the underlying characteristic of the gently rolling valley landscape. Bands of Sandstone of the Triassic period contribute to the undulating character of the area. There are also more recent alluvial deposits beside the course of the River Chew. The transition between the gently sloping landscape of the Upper Chew and Yeo Valleys and the open landscape of the Mendip Hills plateau is a scarp slope of 75 to 235 metres (250–770 ft). The predominant formation is Dolomitic Conglomerate of the Triassic period. It formed as a result of desert erosion and weathering of the scarp slopes. It takes the form of rock fragments mainly derived from older Carboniferous Limestone cemented together by lime and sand which hardened to give the appearance of concrete. The northern boundary is formed by the sides of the Dundry Plateau where the most significant geological formation is the Inferior Oolite of the Jurassic period found on the higher ground around Maes Knoll. This overlays the Lower Lias Clay found on the adjoining slopes. The clays make a poor foundation and landslips are characteristic on the slopes. This area was once connected to the Cotswolds. The intervening land has subsequently been eroded leaving this outlier with the characteristics of the Cotswold Plateau. The unusual geological features have been recognised as Sites of Special Scientific Interest (SSSI) for their geological interest including Barns Batch Spinney, Hartcliff Rocks Quarry and Dundry Main Road South Quarry.

The oldest geological formation in the valley is the Supra-Pennant Measures of the Carboniferous period. It is a significant feature towards the north-eastern part of the area and is represented by the Pensford Syncline coal basin, which formed part of the Somerset coalfield. It is a complex formation containing coal seams and is made up of clay and shales. The landscape is typically undulating and includes outcrops of sandstone. Most of the area around Stanton Drew have neutral to acid red loamy soils with slowly permeable subsoils. Soils to the eastern part of the area are slowly permeable clayey and fine silty soils. They are found on Carboniferous clay and shales typical of the Supra-Pennant Measures. They are frequently waterlogged where the topography dictates. They tend towards being acid and are brown to grey brown in colour. In the south and south east of the area there are coal measures which are sufficiently near the surface for coal mining to have taken place around Clutton and High Littleton. In the eastern area of the valley as the River Chew flows through Publow, Woollard and Compton Dando before joining the River Avon at Keynsham there are alluvial deposits of clay soils.

=== Natural history ===
The valley has several areas designated as Site of Special Scientific Interest (SSSI) for biological interest, including Blagdon Lake, Burledge Hill, Chew Valley Lake, Compton Martin Ochre Mine, Harptree Combe and two sites at Folly Farm.

==== Flora ====
The small and medium-sized fields of the valley are generally bounded by hedges and occasionally by tree belts and woodland, some of which date back to the most evident period of enclosure of earlier open fields which took place in the late medieval period. Hedgerows support the nationally rare Bithynian vetch (Vicia bithynica). Mature oak (Quercus) and ash (Fraxinus excelsior) trees are characteristic of the area with occasional groups of scots pine (Pinus sylvestris) and chestnuts (Castanea sativa). Elm (Ulmus) trees have been lost in this area, and dead/dying elms are also evident in the surrounding landscape.

==== Fauna ====
Wildlife abounds in the valley, particularly the water birds around the rivers and lakes, with Chew Valley Lake considered the third most important site in Britain for wintering wildfowl. In addition to the water birds including ducks, northern shoveler, gadwall and great crested grebes, a wide variety of other bird species can be seen. These range from small birds such as great tits and wrens to mistle thrush. Larger birds include great spotted woodpeckers and common buzzard.

The valley also has a wide variety of small mammals with larger species including Eurasian badger and deer. The valley is home to fifteen of the sixteen bats found in England including a roost, at Compton Martin Ochre Mine, for greater horseshoe bats. A rare and endangered species, the greater horseshoe bat is protected under the Wildlife and Countryside Act 1981 and is listed in Annex II of the 1992 European Community Habitats Directive.

=== Human habitation ===
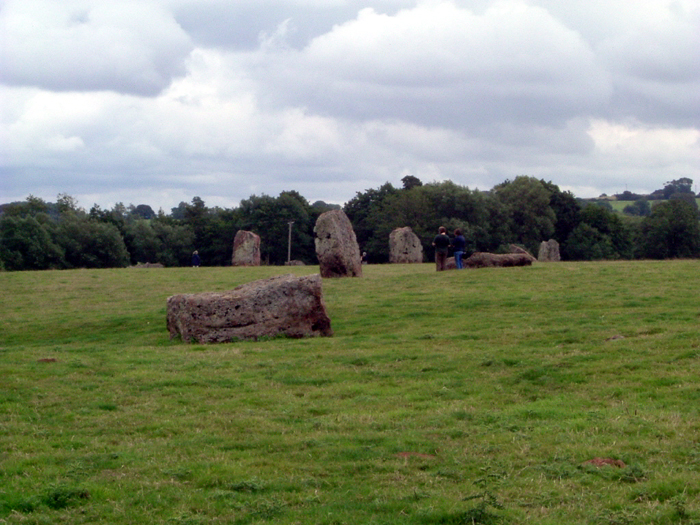
One of the prehistoric Stanton Drew stone circles

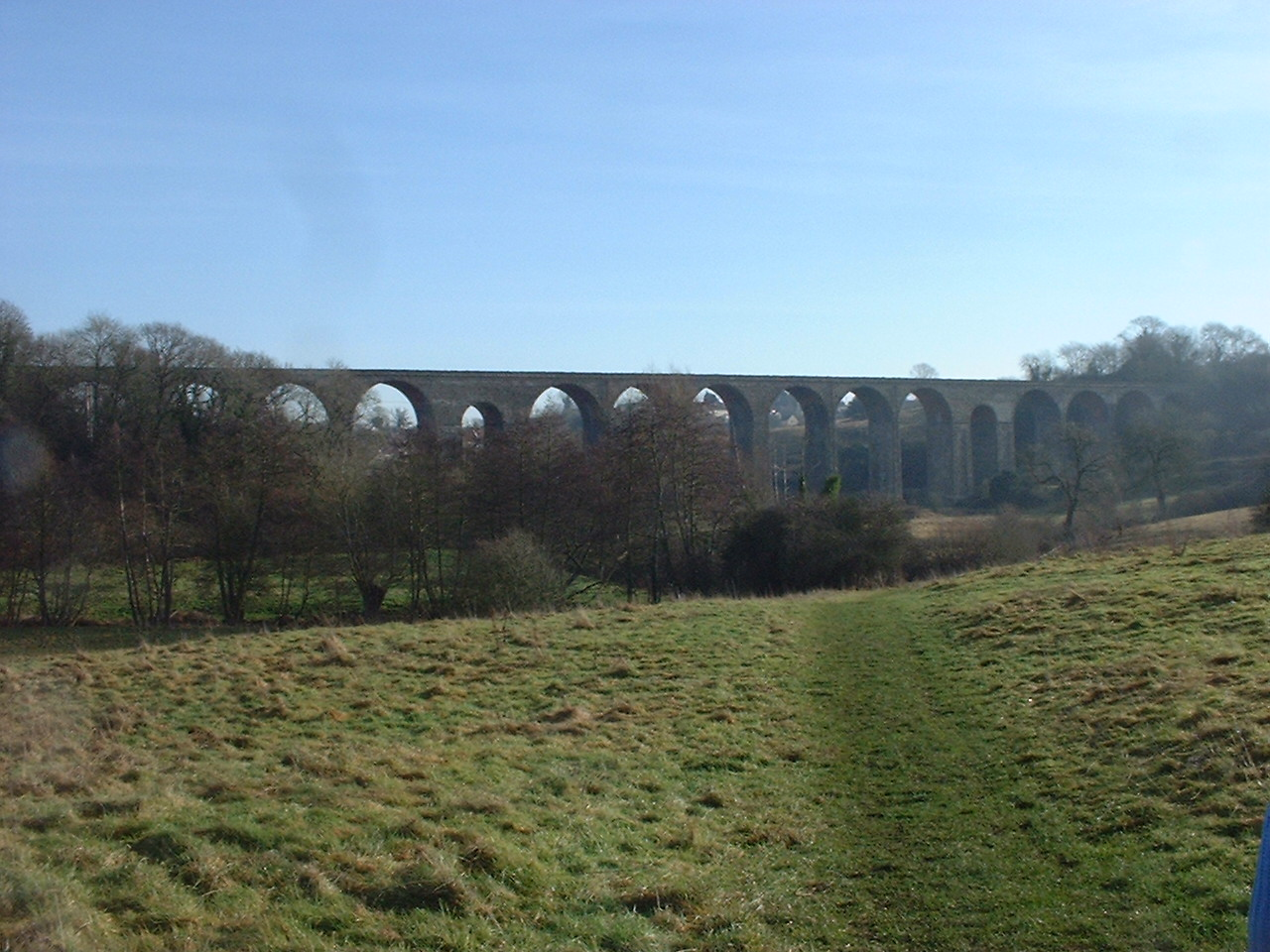
Railway viaduct at Pensford (disused)

Archaeological excavations carried out before the flooding of Chew Valley Lake found evidence of people belonging to the consecutive periods known as Upper Palaeolithic, Mesolithic and Neolithic (Old, Middle and New Stone Age), Bronze Age and Iron Age, comprising implements such as stone knives, flint blades and the head of a mace, along with buildings and graves. Other evidence of occupation from prehistoric times is provided by the henge monument at Stanton Drew, long barrow at Chewton Mendip, and Fairy Toot tumulus at Nempnett Thrubwell. Maes Knoll fort, on Dundry Down in the northern reaches of the valley, is a Scheduled Ancient Monument that dates from the Iron Age; it later served as a terminus for the early medieval Wansdyke earthworks.

There is evidence of Roman remains in particular a villa and burial pits. Artefacts from the valley were sent to the British Museum. Other Roman artefacts from the lake are on display at the Bristol Museum & Art Gallery. The Chew Valley Hoard consists of coins from the 11th century. There are historic parks and mansion houses, including The Court in Stanton Drew, Hunstrete House, Stowey House, Chew Court, Chew Magna Manor House and Sutton Court. Almost all of the villages have churches dating back to the fifteenth or sixteenth century.

The area around Pensford was an important coal mining area during the nineteenth and early twentieth centuries when it formed part of the Somerset Coalfield, although there are no working coal mines today. The line of the now disused Bristol and North Somerset Railway runs south from Bristol crossing over the River Chew on the surviving distinctive Pensford Viaduct and on to Midsomer Norton. The area suffered during the 1968 Chew Stoke flood, which prompted localised evacuation of populated valley areas in the lower parts of the valley around Pensford and Keynsham.

==== Field patterns ====
The small fields in the western part of the area are particularly characteristic of the Chew Valley and date back to the most evident period of enclosure of earlier open fields which took place in the late medieval period. Fields of this category are generally small in size, regular in outline and often the boundaries preserve the outlines of the earlier strip field system. Regional variations in field size and pattern do occur. For example, there is evidence of medieval clearance of woodland on the slopes around Nempnett Thrubwell, south of Bishop Sutton and west and south of Chelwood.

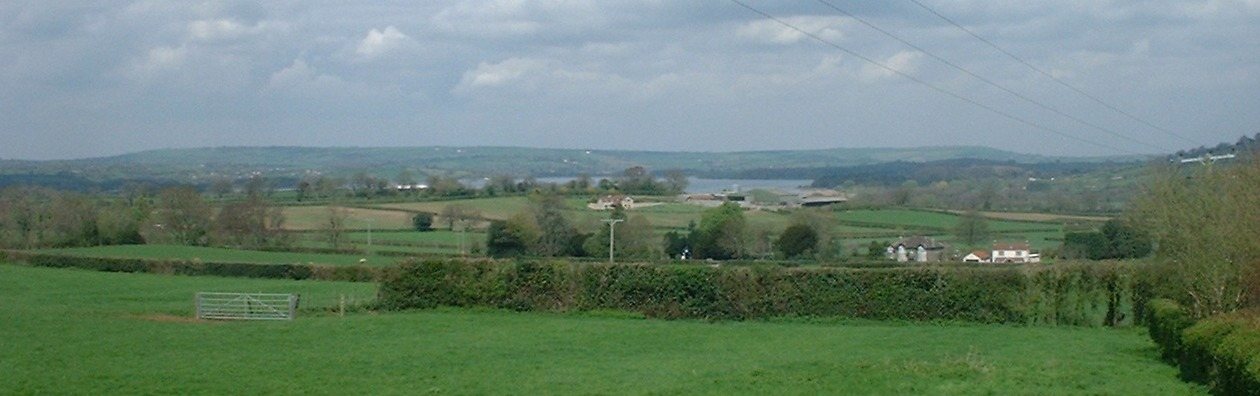
The Chew Valley as seen from East Harptree

== Climate ==
Along with the rest of South West England, the Chew Valley has a temperate climate which is generally wetter and milder than the rest of the country. The annual mean temperature is approximately 10 °C (50.0 °F). Seasonal temperature variation is less extreme than most of the United Kingdom because of the adjacent sea temperatures. The summer months of July and August are the warmest with mean daily maxima of approximately 21 °C (69.8 °F). In winter mean minimum temperatures of 1 °C (33.8 °F) or 2 °C (35.6 °F) are common. In the summer the Azores high pressure affects the south-west of England, however convective cloud sometimes forms inland, reducing the number of hours of sunshine. Annual sunshine rates are slightly less than the regional average of 1,600 hours. In December 1998 there were 20 days without sun recorded at Yeovilton. Most of the rainfall in the south-west is caused by Atlantic depressions or by convection. Most of the rainfall in autumn and winter is caused by the Atlantic depressions, which is when they are most active. In summer, a large proportion of the rainfall is caused by sun heating the ground leading to convection and to showers and thunderstorms. Average rainfall is around 700 mm (28 in). About 8–15 days of snowfall is typical. November to March have the highest mean wind speeds, and June to August have the lightest winds. The predominant wind direction is from the south-west.

== Population and demographics ==
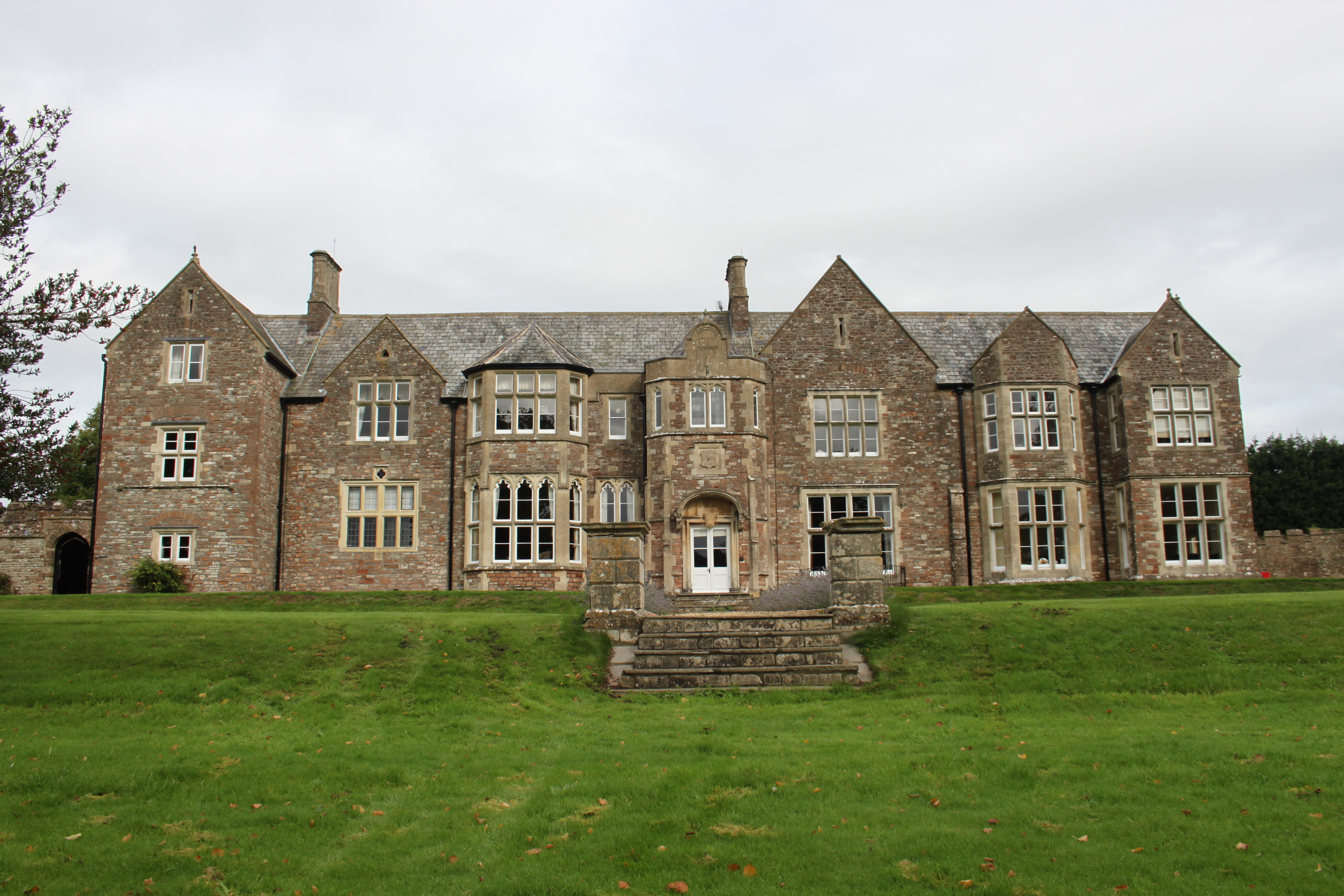
Sutton Court, a Grade II* listed building at Stowey

Many of the large houses in the valley were built or bought by wealthy merchants from Bristol and Bath who employed local people in their households. Bess of Hardwick (1527–1606) is known to have lived in Sutton Court, Stowey, for a few years in the sixteenth century when, after the death of her first husband Sir William Cavendish, she married Sir William St. Loe, who was Chief Butler of England and captain of the guard to Queen Elizabeth, and owned several manors within the valley and surrounding areas. Around this period a close neighbour was Sir John Popham (1533–1607) who was a judge and the Speaker of Parliament. In the seventeenth century the eminent philosopher John Locke (1632–1704) lived in Belluton; his house is still known as John Locke's cottage. In the eighteenth century the poet John Langhorne (1735–1779) became the curate at Blagdon around the time that Augustus Montague Toplady (1740–1778) was the priest. Geologist William Smith (1769–1839) moved to the valley in 1791 to make a valuation survey of the Sutton Court estate and later worked for the Somersetshire Coal Canal Company.

John Sanger, the circus proprietor, was born in Chew Magna in 1816. William Rees-Mogg, former editor of The Times, took the title Baron Rees-Mogg of Hinton Blewett in 1988. Jazz clarinettist Acker Bilk lived in Pensford. Dr Phil Hammond and wildlife television producer Richard Brock also live in the valley.

In the past part of the population worked in coal mining, although there are no working mines in the area now. There is still a fairly large agricultural workforce and in light industry or service industries, although many people commute to surrounding cities for work. According to the 2011 census the valley has a population of approximately 5,000, largely living in one of the dozen or so villages and in isolated farms and hamlets. The average age of the population is 42 years, with unemployment rates of 1–4% of all economically active people aged 16–74, however these figures are approximations because the ward areas covered and described in the census statistics do not relate exactly to the area of the valley. In the Indices of deprivation 2010 all of the areas within the valley were considered to be in the most affluent third in England.

== Buildings and settlements ==
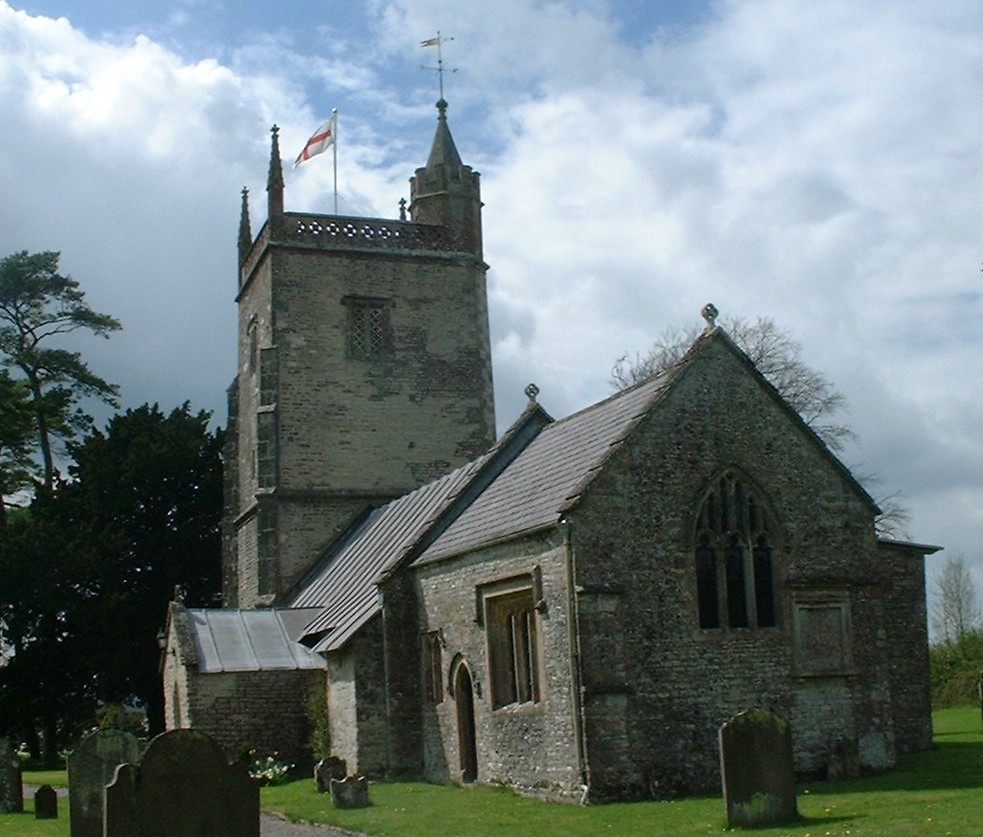
St Margaret's Church at Hinton Blewitt

The villages tend to have been built at the points where it was possible to cross the rivers and streams. Chew Magna is the business centre with a range of shops, banks etc. Other villages have local shops, often combined with post offices. Most villages have pubs and village halls which provide the majority of the social activity.

The traditional building material is white Lias Limestone, sometimes incorporating red sandstone or conglomerate, with red clay tiled roofs. Buildings, particularly the churches, date back hundreds of years, for example those at Marksbury and Compton Martin, the latter incorporating a columbarium.

=== Listed buildings ===
There are hundreds of listed buildings in the valley. Listing refers to a building or other structure officially designated as being of special architectural, historical or cultural significance. The authority for listing is granted by the Planning (Listed Buildings and Conservation Areas) Act 1990 and is administered by English Heritage, an agency of the Department for Digital, Culture, Media and Sport. Grade I covers buildings of exceptional interest, Grade II* particularly important buildings of special interest and Grade II buildings of special interest. Listed buildings in the valley include five churches dating back to the fourteenth century or even earlier, with grade I status: Church of St Andrew, Chew Magna, Church of St Bartholomew, Ubley, Church of St James, Cameley, Church of St Margaret, Hinton Blewett and the Church of St Michael the Archangel, Compton Martin.

== Railway connections ==
Trains serve Keynsham railway station on the Great Western Main Line and Wessex Main Line with services provided by Great Western Railway and South Western Railway. Buses also connect with Bristol Temple Meads.

== Transport ==
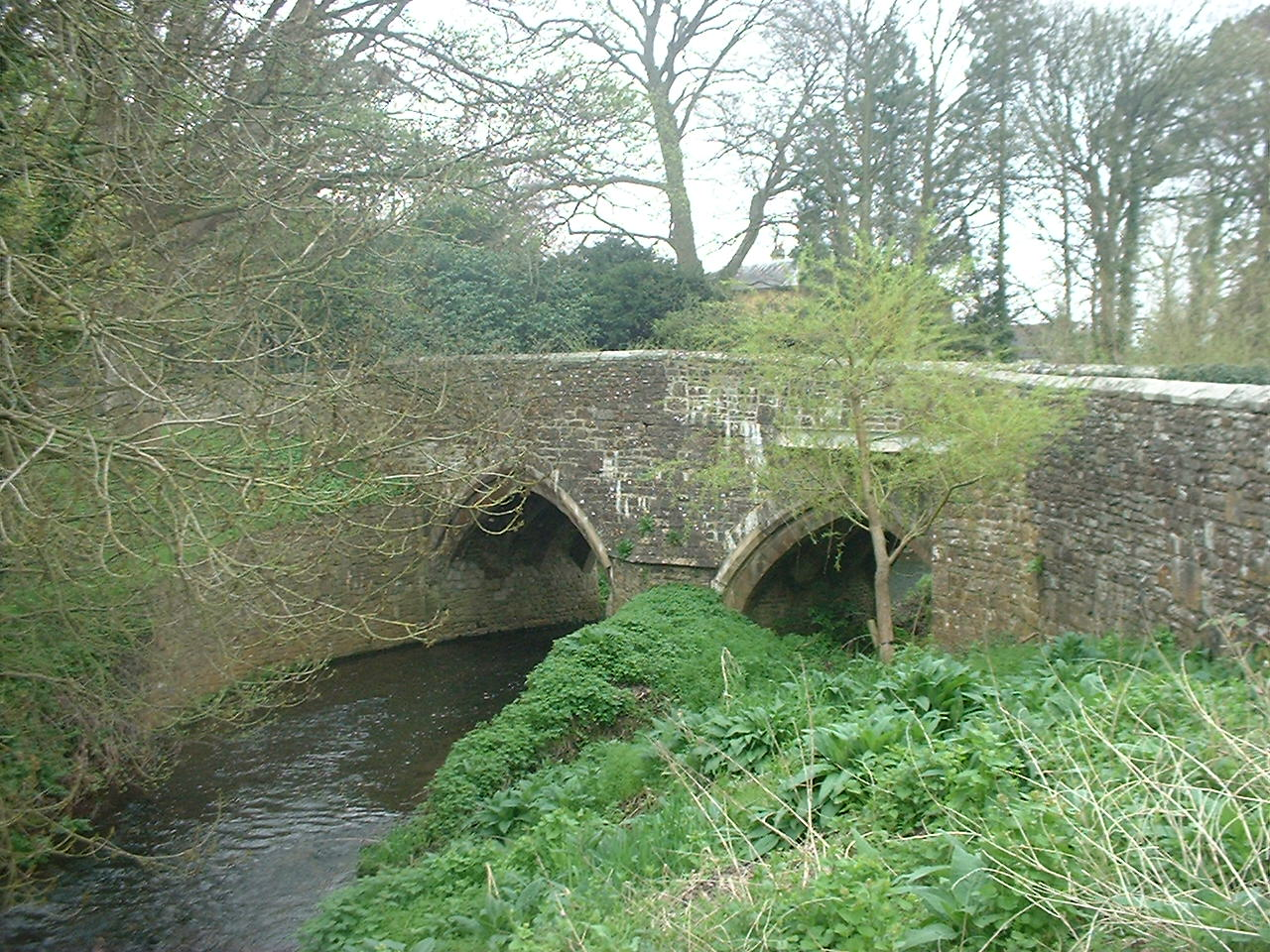
13th-century bridge at Stanton Drew

At the western end of the valley is the A38 and Bristol Airport, which means parts of the valley are on the flight path. The valley is also crossed by the A37 and they are joined by the A368. Most of the roads in the valley are small single track lanes with little traffic although a bottleneck often occurs within Chew Magna. The "Chew Valley Explorer" bus route 672/674 provided access to the villages in the valley. The nearest mainline railway station for most of the valley is Bristol Temple Meads. Cyclists can gain access via part of the Padstow to Bristol West Country Way, National Cycle Network Route 3.

The Monarch's Way long-distance footpath crosses the valley.

== Schools ==
Chew Valley School is the main secondary school (11–18 years) for the valley. It is situated between Chew Magna and Chew Stoke. The latest (2011) Ofsted Inspection Report describes this specialist Performing Arts College as a mixed comprehensive school with 1,201 pupils on roll. The school is popular and oversubscribed with 226 students in the sixth form. The school has been successful in gaining a number of national and regional awards. There are state primary schools (4–11 years) in most of the local villages.

== Sport and leisure facilities ==
The local villages have football pitches and children's play areas. Gymnasium facilities, squash courts, badminton etc., and outdoor all-weather pitches are available at the Chew Valley Leisure Centre between Chew Magna and Chew Stoke. There are a range of clubs and societies for young and old, including Scout groups, gardening society, and the Women's institute. There are areas in the valley which the Countryside Agency has designated as access land: Burledge Hill (south of Bishop Sutton)(grid reference ST589590), Castle Earthworks (between Stowey and Bishop Sutton)(grid reference ST597592), Knowle Hill (Newtown south of Chew Magna)(grid reference ST583613), Round Hill (Folly Farm)(grid reference ST605608) and Shortwood Common (Litton) (grid reference ST595553).

A Bowls club is in Chew Stoke, cricket pitches and teams in Chew Magna and Blagdon. There are football teams in the valley including Chew Valley Football Club and Bishop Sutton F.C. The rugby club is based next to the leisure centre. The Bishop Sutton Tennis club is the largest in the valley, and there are also tennis clubs at Pensford and East Harptree. Both Chew Valley Lake and Blagdon Lake provide extensive fishing under permit from Bristol Water. The River Chew and most of its tributaries also have fishing but this is generally under licences to local angling clubs. Chew Valley Sailing Club is situated on Chew Valley Lake and provides dinghy sailing at all levels and hosts national and international competitions. Swimming is not allowed in the lakes and there are no swimming pools in the valley; however these are available locally in Bristol, Bath, Cheddar and Midsomer Norton.

Each October the Chew Valley Arts trail takes place in venues around the valley during which over 50 local artists display their works in such media as painting, printmaking, sculpture, decorative glass, pottery, photography, jewellery and sugar craft. The valley and lakes have been an inspiration to artists and there is a small art gallery at Chew Valley Lake. Live music and comedy events take place in local pubs and village halls, with the village of Pensford holding a music festival every year.
