= Keynsham =

Town and civil parish in Somerset, England

Coordinates: 51.4135°N 2.4968°W

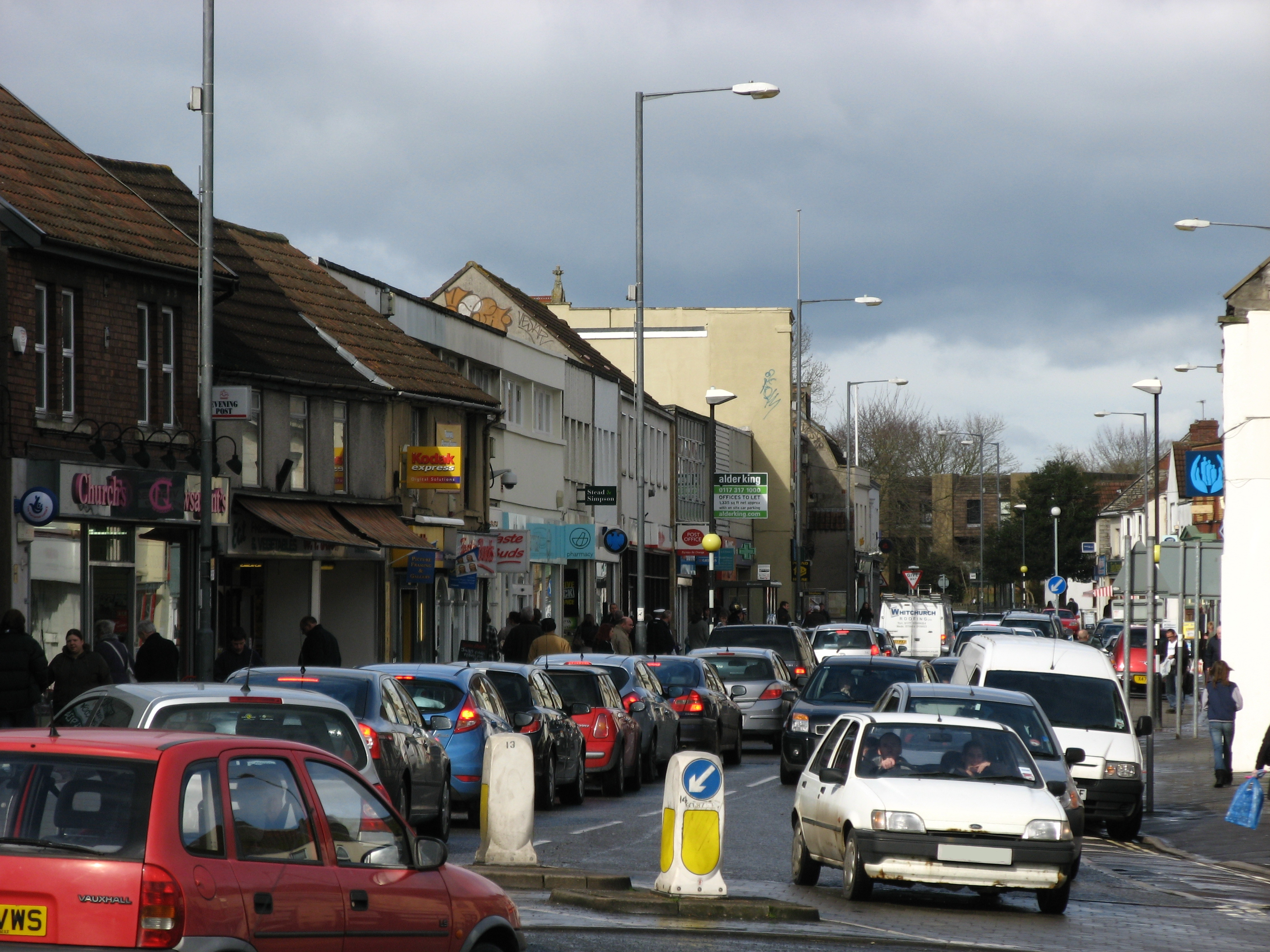
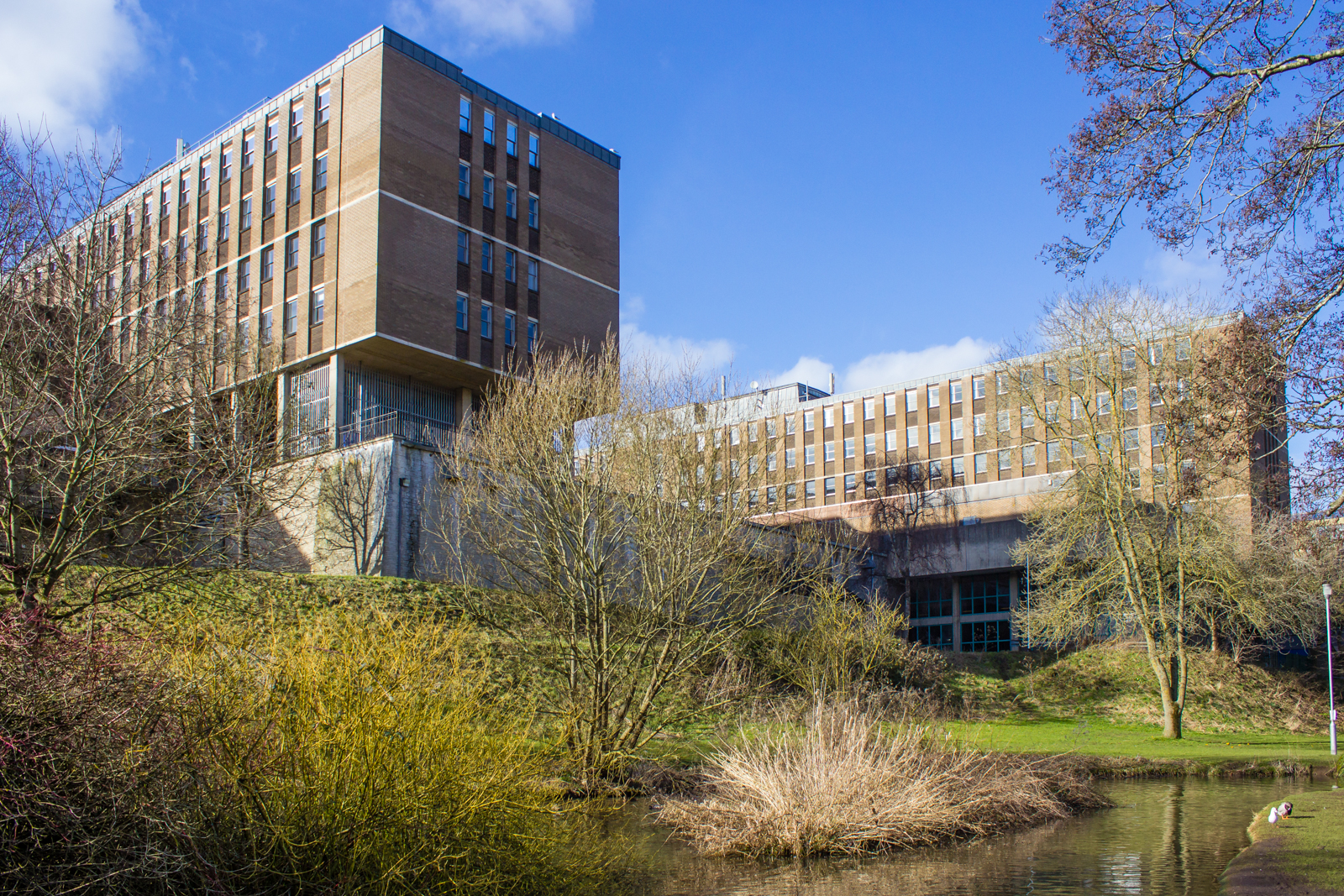
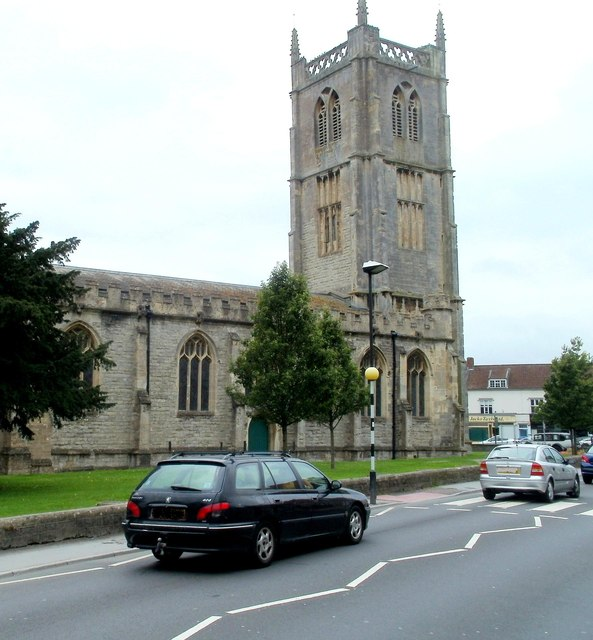
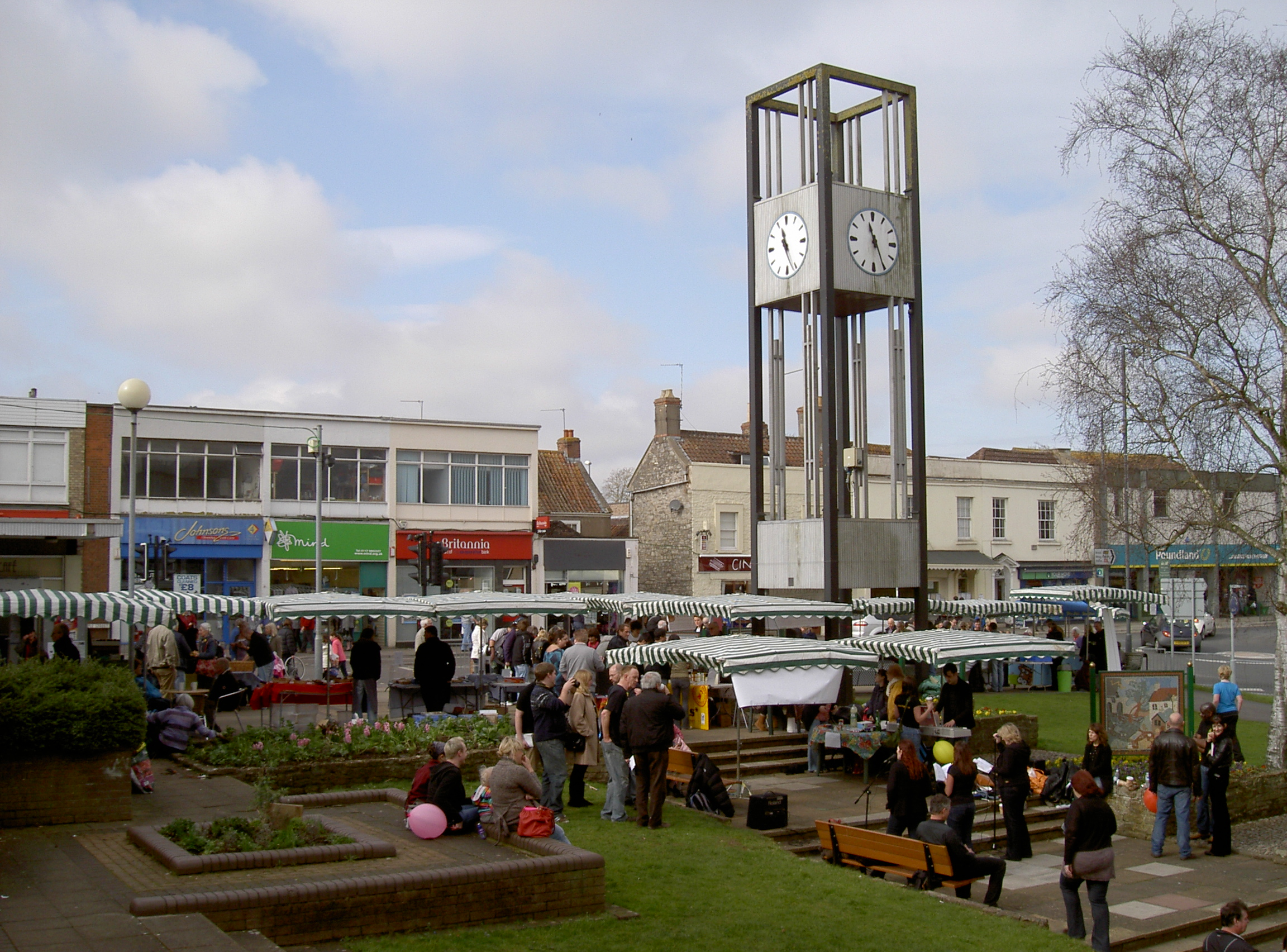
- From the top, High street, Riverside Centre, Church of St John the Baptist, Marketplace and the Clocktower

- Location within Somerset
- Population: 19,596 (Parish, 2021); 19,255 (Built-up area, 2021)
- OS grid reference: ST654684
- Civil parish: Keynsham
- Unitary authority: Bath and North East Somerset
- Ceremonial county: Somerset
- Region: South West
- Country: England
- Sovereign state: United Kingdom
- Post town: BRISTOL
- Postcode district: BS31
- Dialling code: 0117
- Police: Avon and Somerset
- Fire: Avon
- Ambulance: South Western
- UK Parliament: North East Somerset and Hanham

Keynsham (/ˈkeɪnʃəm/ KAYN-shəm) is a town and civil parish in the Bath and North East Somerset district of Somerset, England. It lies close to the south-eastern outskirts of the city of Bristol, on the A4 road that links Bristol and Bath. At the 2021 census the parish had a population of 19,596 and the built-up area had a population of 19,255. It was listed in the Domesday Book as Cainesham (as it is pronounced), which is believed to mean the home of Saint Keyne.

The site of the town has been occupied since prehistoric times, and may have been the site of the Roman settlement of Trajectus. The remains of at least two Roman villas have been excavated, and an additional 15 Roman buildings have been detected beneath the Keynsham Hams. Keynsham developed into a medieval market town after Keynsham Abbey was founded around 1170. It is situated at the confluence of the River Chew and River Avon and was subject to serious flooding before the creation of Chew Valley Lake and river level controls at Keynsham Lock in 1727. The Chew Stoke flood of 1968 inundated large parts of the town. It was home to the Cadbury's chocolate factory, Somerdale, which opened in 1935 as a major employer in the town.

It is home to Memorial Park, which is used for the annual town festival and several nature reserves. The park is also the centre of the annual chicken race, held every October. The town is served by Keynsham railway station on the London-Bristol and Bristol-Southampton trunk routes and is close to the A4 road which bypassed the town in 1964. There are schools, religious, sporting, and cultural clubs and venues.

== History ==
=== Roman Trajectus ===
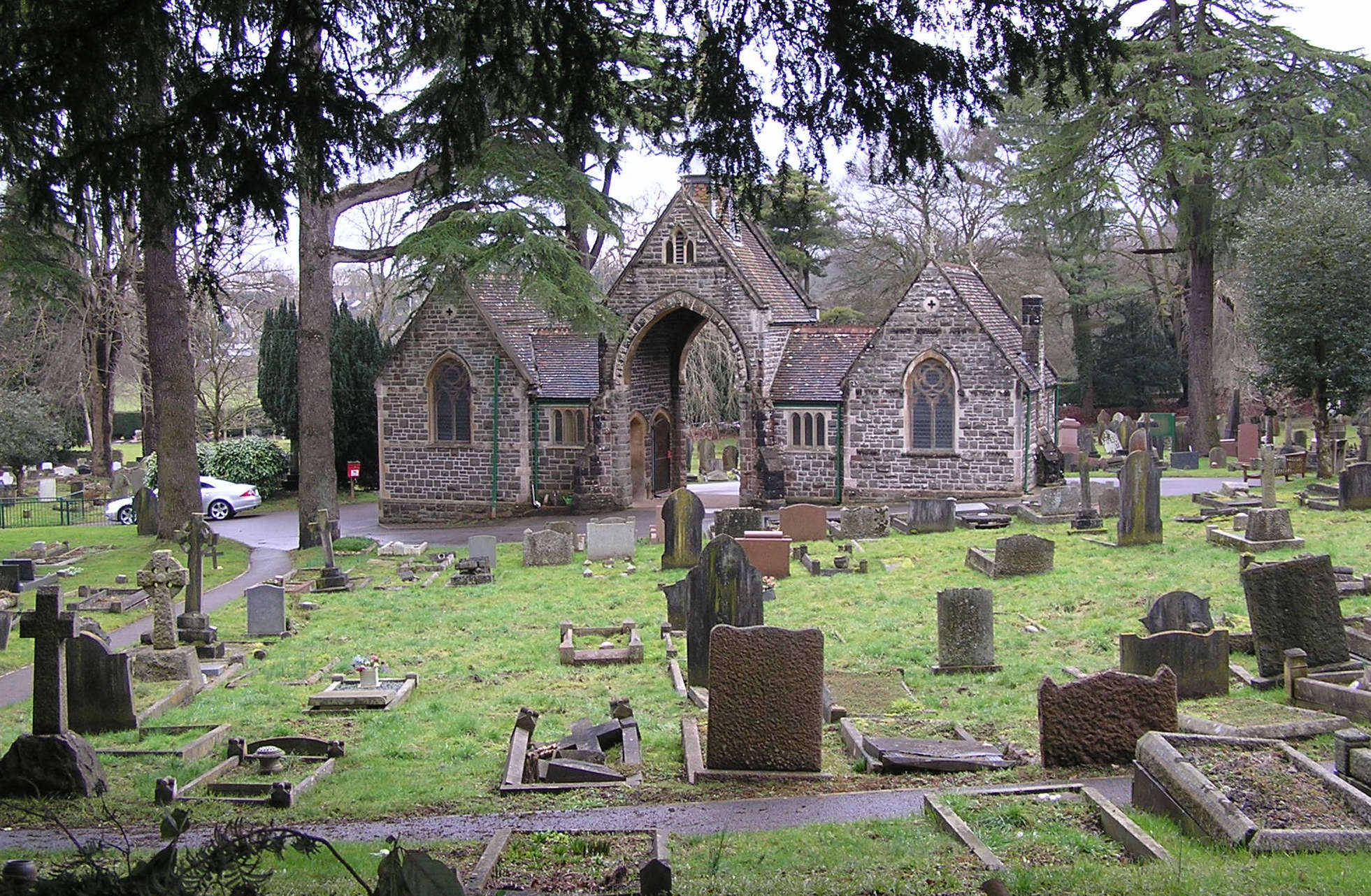
Keynsham Cemetery at Durley Hill, which is built over the remains of the grand Roman villa

Evidence of occupation dates back to prehistoric times, and during the Roman period, Keynsham may have been the site of the Roman settlement of Trajectus, which is the Latin word for "bridgehead." It is believed that a settlement around a Roman ford over the River Avon existed somewhere in the vicinity, and the numerous Roman ruins discovered in Keynsham make it a likely candidate for this lost settlement.

In 1877 during construction of the Durley Hill Cemetery, the remains of a grand Roman villa with over 30 rooms was discovered. However, construction of the cemetery went ahead, and the majority of the villa is now located beneath the Victorian cemetery and an adjacent road. The cemetery was expanded in 1922, and an archeological dig was carried out ahead of the interments, leading to the excavation of 17 rooms and the rescue of 10 elaborate mosaics.

At the same time as the grand Roman villa was being excavated at Durley Hill Cemetery, a second smaller villa was discovered during the construction of Fry's Somerdale Chocolate Factory. Two fine stone coffins were found, interred with the remains of a man and a woman. The villa and coffins were removed to a place near the gates of the factory grounds, and construction on the factory went ahead. Fry's built in the grounds of the factory a museum which for many years housed the Durley Hill mosaics, the coffins, and numerous other artefacts. In 2012, Taylor Wimpey, about to develop the factory site, made a detailed geophysical assessment of the area, and discovered an additional 15 Roman buildings centred around a Roman road beneath Keynsham Hams, with evidence of additional Roman buildings that had been disturbed by quarrying.

=== Medieval Keynsham ===
According to legend, Saint Keyne, daughter of King Brychan of Brycheiniog (Brecon), lived here on the banks of the River Avon during the 5th century. Before settling here, she had been warned by the local King that the marshy area was swarming with snakes, which prevented habitation. St Keyne prayed to the heavens and turned the snakes to stone. The fossil ammonites found in the area were believed to be the result. However, there is no evidence that her cult was ever celebrated in Keynsham.

Some scattered archeological evidence suggests that an Anglo-Saxon settlement existed in Keynsham in the High Street area, and that in the 9th century a Minster church existed in Keynsham as well. The earliest documentary reference to Keynsham is in the Anglo-Saxon Chronicle, (c. 980) which refers to it as Cægineshamme, Old English for 'Cæga's Hamm.' The town is also listed in the Domesday Book of 1086 as "Cainesham." It has therefore been suggested that the origin of Keynsham's name is not, in fact Saint Keyne, but from "Ceagin (Caega)."

Around 1170, Keynsham Abbey was founded by the Victorine congregation of canon regulars. Archeological evidence suggests that the abbey was built over the site of the previous Saxon Minster church. The settlement developed into a medieval market town, and the abbey of Keynsham was given ownership of the Keynsham Hundred. The abbey survived until the dissolution of the monasteries in 1539, and a house was subsequently built on the site. The remains have been designated as a Grade I listed building by English Heritage.

=== Stuart era ===
Keynsham played a part in the Civil War as the Roundheads occupied the town and also camped there for the night, using the pub now known as the Lock Keeper Inn as a guard post. During the Monmouth Rebellion of 1685 the town was the site of a battle between royalist forces and the rebel Duke of Monmouth. Bridges Almshouses were built around 1685 and may have been for the widows of those killed in the rebellion.

=== Post World War II ===
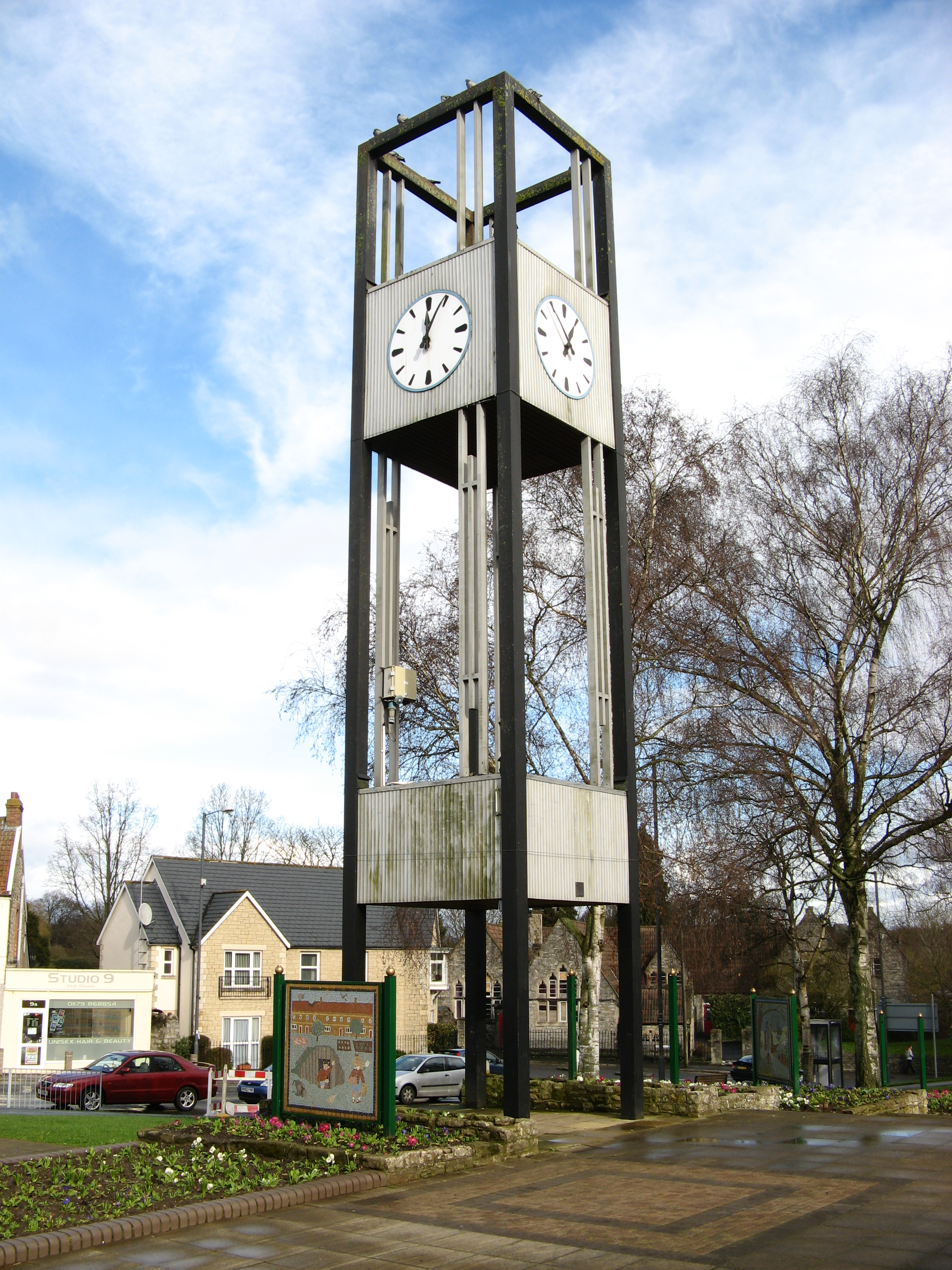
1960s Keynsham Clock Tower, removed in 2010s regeneration

Keynsham rose to fame during the late 1950s and early 1960s when it featured in a long-running series of advertisements on Radio Luxembourg for Horace Batchelor's Infra-draw betting system. To obtain the system, listeners had to write to Batchelor's Keynsham post office box, and Keynsham was always painstakingly spelled out on-air, with Batchelor famously intoning "Keynsham – spelt K-E-Y-N-S-H-A-M – Keynsham, Bristol". This was done because the proper pronunciation of Keynsham – "Cane-sham" – does not make the spelling of Keynsham immediately obvious to the radio listener.

Since the 1950s Keynsham has become a dormitory town for Bristol and Bath. The High Street shopping area has been remodelled, and a Town Hall, Library, and Clock Tower were built in the mid-1960s.

Before the creation of Chew Valley Lake and river level controls at Keynsham Lock and weir, Keynsham was prone to flooding. The Great Flood of 1968 inundated large parts of the town, destroying the town's bridges including the county bridge over the Avon which had stood since medieval times, and private premises on Dapps Hill; the devastation was viewed by the Duke of Edinburgh. After the flood the Memorial Park, which had been laid out after World War II was extended.

=== 2010s regeneration ===
Design work for regeneration of the town hall area was awarded by Bath and North East Somerset Council to Aedas in 2010, with the works cost stated in 2011 to be £33 million (£34 million in 2012). Realisation of the plans is hoped to "attract new business and jobs", in the aftermath of the announcement of the Cadbury Somerdale Factory closure.

In January 2012, it was announced that the Willmott Dixon Group had been appointed as contractor on the scheme. The council's planning committee in August 2012 deferred the approval decision, pending alterations to the external appearance of the building. These were approved in October 2012, with demolition commencing in the same month. The regenerated Keynsham Civic Centre came back into use in late 2014 and early 2015.

In the latter half of the 2010s, Keynsham underwent rapid expansion with hundreds of new homes built.

== Governance ==
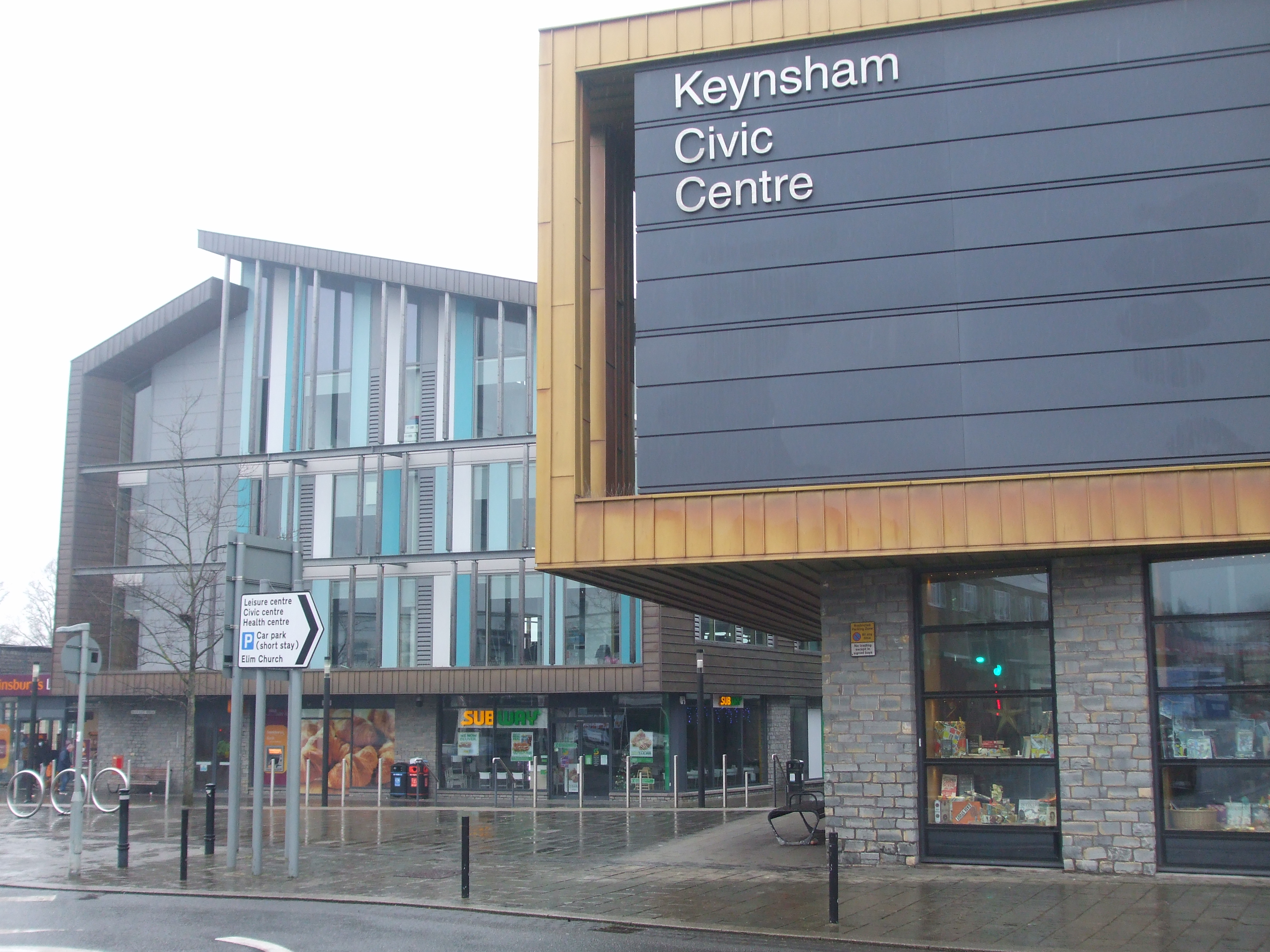
Keynsham Civic Centre

There are two main tiers of local government covering Keynsham, at parish (town) and unitary authority level: Keynsham Town Council and Bath and North East Somerset Council. The latter is a member of the West of England Combined Authority, led by the directly elected Mayor of the West of England. The town council is based at 15–17 Temple Street. Bath and North East Somerset Council also has offices in the town at Keynsham Civic Centre on Market Walk.

Playing fields and playgrounds are provided in Memorial Park, Downfield, Kelston Road, Teviot Road, Holmoak Road and Manor Road with basketball facilities at Teviot Road and Holmoak Road and a BMX track at Keynsham Road. The Keynsham town council is also responsible for the football pitches and pavilion at Manor Road and the floodlit Multi Sport Site in Memorial Park. It also provides support for community groups organising music and cultural events.

For national elections, the town forms part of the North East Somerset and Hanham constituency.

Keynsham is twinned with Libourne in France.

=== Administrative history ===
Keynsham was an ancient parish in the Keynsham hundred of Somerset. As well as Keynsham itself, the parish historically also included Queen Charlton, which became a separate parish in 1741, and Brislington, which had become a separate parish by 1786.

When elected parish and district councils were established in 1894, Keynsham was given a parish council and included in the Keynsham Rural District, which also covered several nearby parishes. The Keynsham Rural District was merged with the neighbouring Bath Rural District in 1933 to form the Bathavon Rural District.

In 1938, the parish of Keynsham was enlarged to take in the neighbouring parish of Saltford, and there were also boundary adjustments with the neighbouring parishes of Compton Dando and Whitchurch. At the same time, the parish was removed from the rural district and converted into an urban district.

Keynsham Urban District was abolished in 1974 under the Local Government Act 1972. The area became part of the new Wansdyke district in the new county of Avon. No successor parish was created for the former Keynsham Urban District as part of the 1974 reforms, and so it became unparished. The area of the pre-1974 urban district was made into two new civil parishes called Keynsham and Saltford in 1991. The parish council for Keynsham adopted the name Keynsham Town Council.

Wandsyke and Avon were abolished in 1996, when Keynsham became part of Bath and North East Somerset. For ceremonial purposes, the area was restored to Somerset at the same time.

== Geography ==
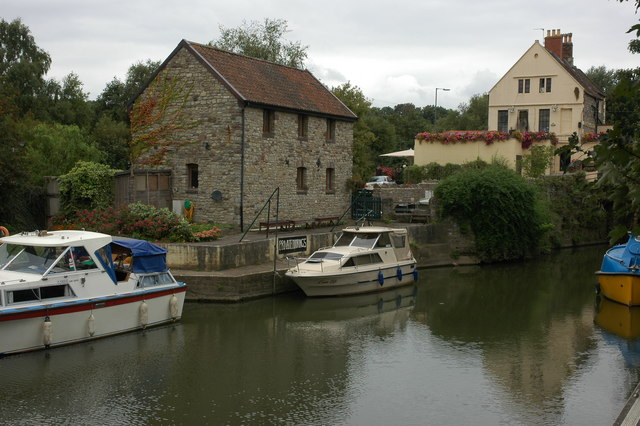
The Lock Keeper pub on the River Avon

Keynsham is located where the River Chew meets the River Avon. Fishing rights for the Millground and Chewton sections of the Chew are owned by Keynsham Angling Club. The Mill Ground stretch of the River Chew consists of the six fields on the western bank from Chewton Place at Chewton Keynsham to the Albert Mill. The water is home to chub, roach, European perch and rudd, along with good numbers of gudgeon, dace and trout. Keynsham Lock on the Avon opened in 1727. Just above the lock are some visitor moorings and a pub, on an island between the lock and the weir. The weir side of the island is also the mouth of the River Chew.

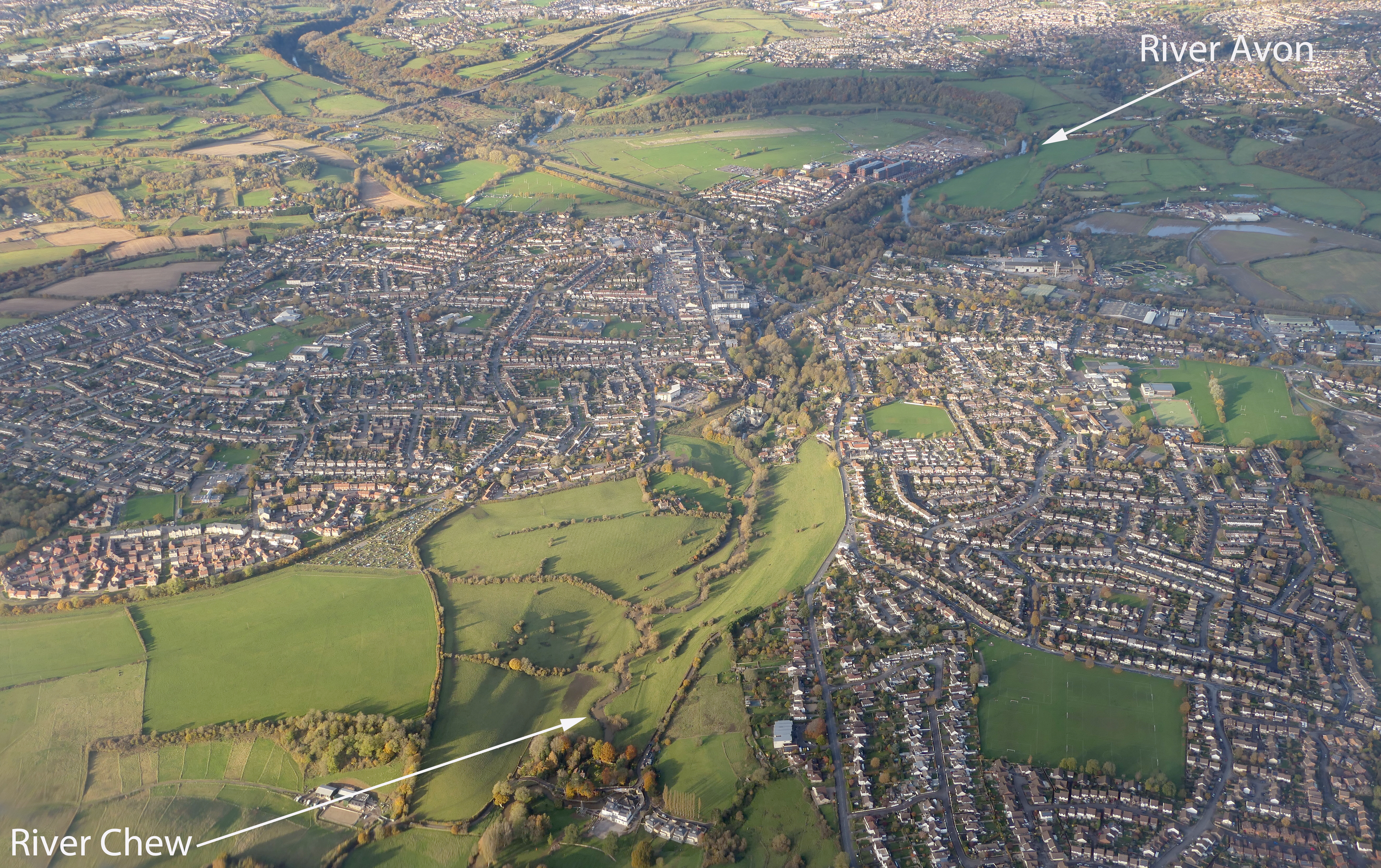
An aerial view of Keynsham.

Memorial Park, the northern part of which has existed as parkland since the 19th century, as shown by the ordnance Survey maps of 1864 and 1867, was formally laid out after World War II was extended after the floods of 1968. It covers 10.7 hectares (26 acres) of woodland and grass alongside the River Chew. It commemorates the war dead of Keynsham and includes facilities including two children's play areas, a skateboard park, multi-sport area, bowling green, public toilets, a bandstand and refreshment kiosk. The formal gardens within the park are adjacent to the River Chew with the Dapps Hill Woods at its western end. Part of the park is known locally as Chew Park because of its proximity to the river and another area, close to Keynsham Abbey as Abbey Park. The park received the Green Flag Award in 2008/09, and again for 2009/10.

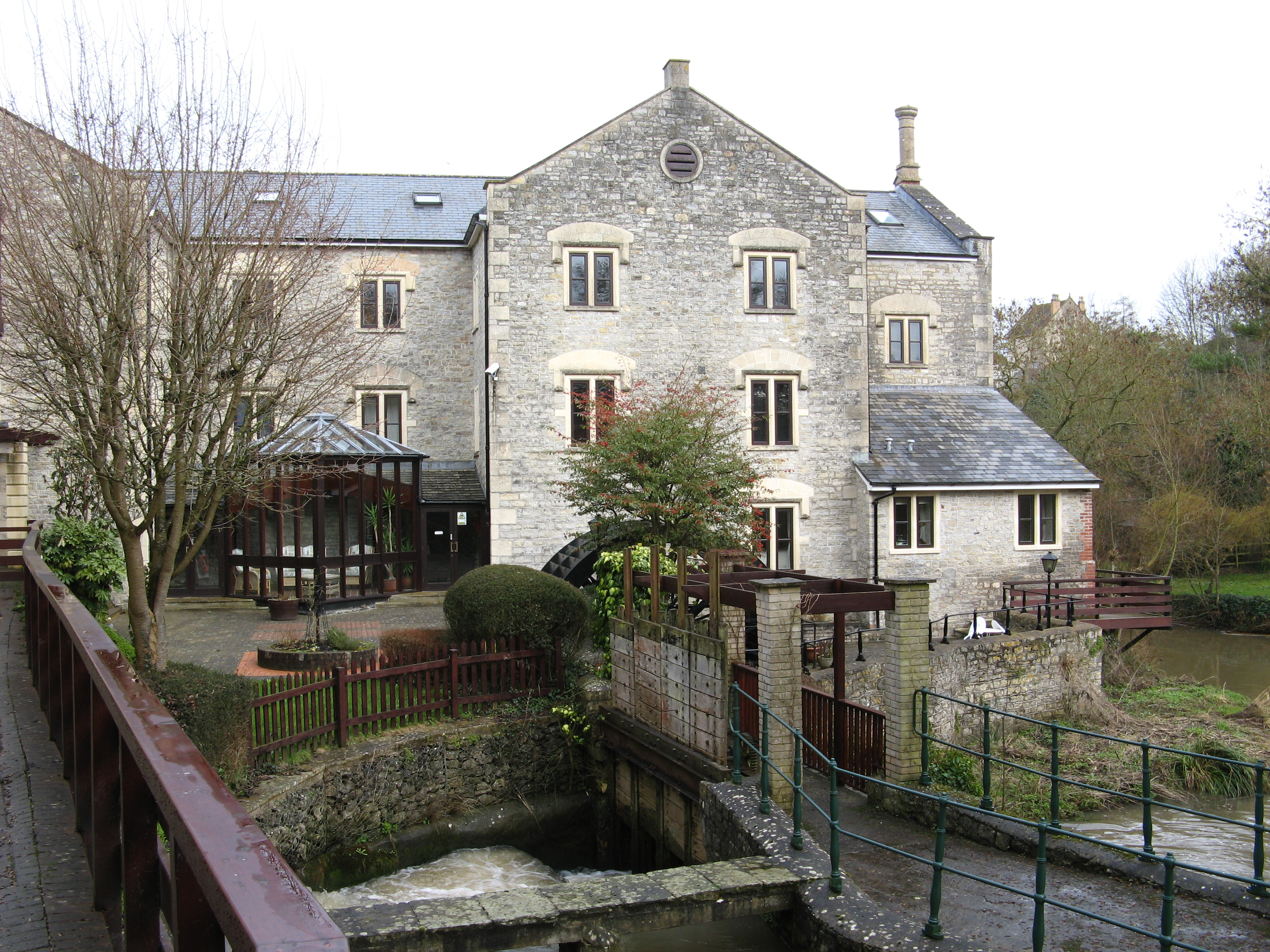
Albert Mill on the River Chew

On the outskirts of Keynsham lies Keynsham Humpy Tumps, one of the most floristically rich acidic grassland sites within the Avon area. The site is on a south-facing slope running alongside the Bristol to Bath railway line. It consists of open patches of grassland and bare rock, interspersed with blocks of scrub. It is the only site in Avon at which upright chickweed Moenchia erecta, occurs. Other locally notable plant species found here include annual knawel Scleranthus annuus, sand spurrey Spergularia rubra, subterranean clover Trifolium subterraneus and prickly sedge Carex muricata ssp. lamprocarpa. The site does not have any statutory conservation status, and is not managed for its biodiversity interest. Threats to its ecological value include the encroachment of scrub onto the grassland areas, and damage from motorcycle scrambling. Between Keynsham and Saltford, a 15 hectares (37 acres) area of green belt has been planted, with over 19,000 trees, as the Manor Road Community Woodland, which has been designated as a Nature Reserve. Nearby is the Avon Valley Country Park tourist attraction.

Along with the rest of South West England, Keynsham has a temperate climate which is generally wetter and milder than the rest of England. The annual mean temperature is about 10 °C (50 °F) with seasonal and diurnal variations, but due to the modifying effect of the sea, the range is less than in most other parts of the United Kingdom. January is the coldest month with mean minimum temperatures between 1 °C (34 °F) and 2 °C (36 °F). July and August are the warmest months in the region with mean daily maxima around 21 °C (70 °F). In general, December is the dullest month and June the sunniest. The south west of England enjoys a favoured location, particularly in summer, when the Azores High extends its influence north-eastwards towards the UK.

Cloud often forms inland, especially near hills, and reduces exposure to sunshine. The average annual sunshine totals around 1600 hours. Rainfall tends to be associated with Atlantic depressions or with convection. In summer, convection caused by solar surface heating sometimes forms shower clouds and a large proportion of the annual precipitation falls from showers and thunderstorms at this time of year. Average rainfall is around 800–900 mm (31–35 in). About 8–15 days of snowfall is typical. November to March have the highest mean wind speeds, with June to August having the lightest. The predominant wind direction is from the south west.

== Demography ==
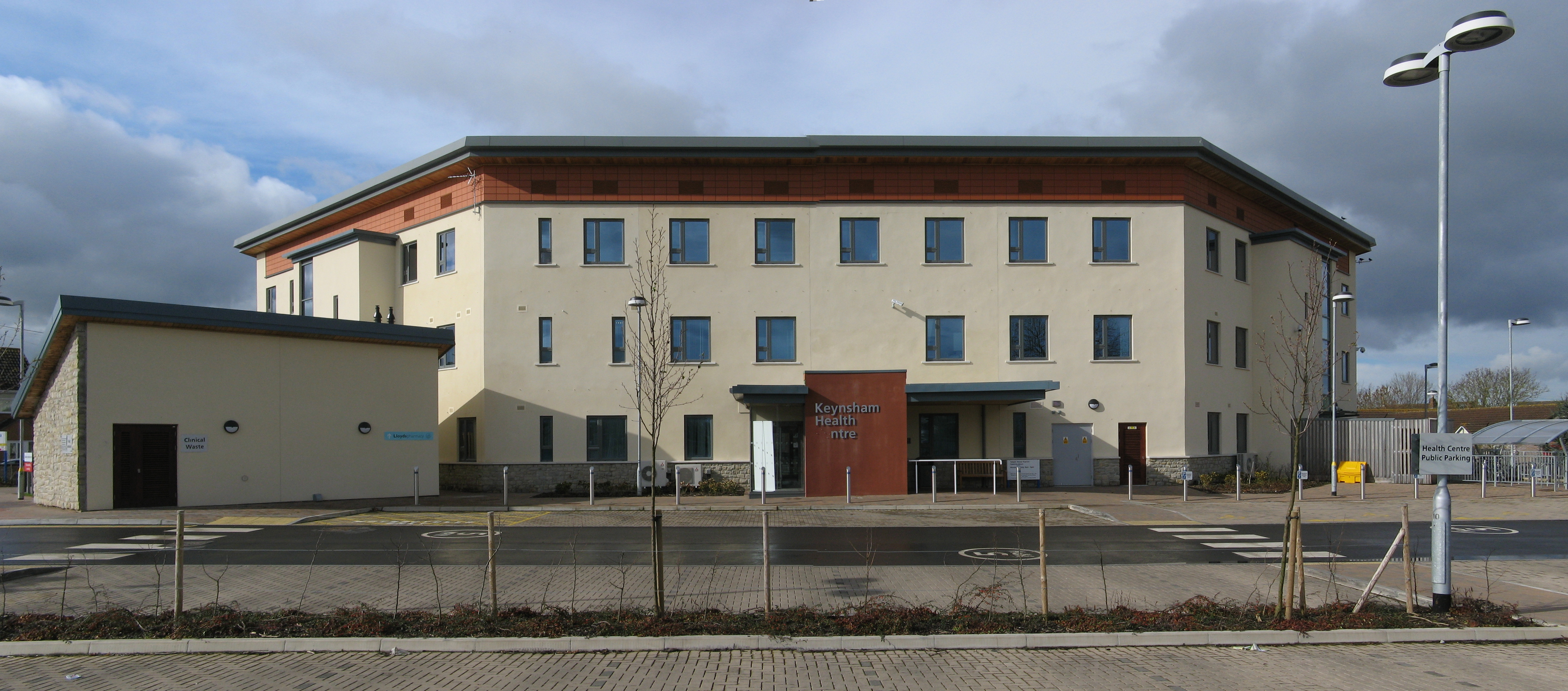
Keynsham Health Centre

In the 2001 census Keynsham had a population of 15,533, in 6,545 households, of which 6,480 described themselves as White. Keynsham East Ward had a population of 5,479, Keynsham North 5,035 and Keynsham South 5,019. In each of the wards between 75 and 80% of the population described themselves as Christians, and around 15% said that they had no religion.

In 1881 the population of the civil parish was 2,482. This grew gradually until 1931 when there were 4,521, before there was a steeper rise to 1951 when there were 8,277. Over the next ten years this nearly doubled to 15,152 in 1961.

== Economy ==
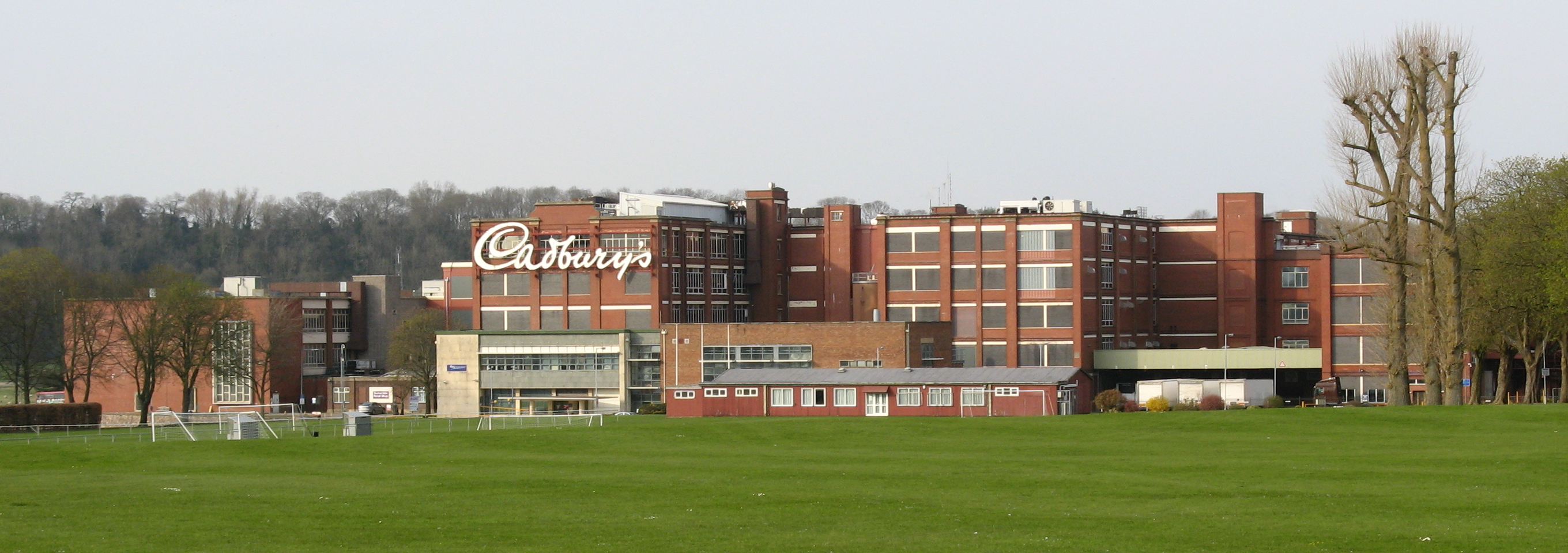
The Somerdale Factory from front lawns in 2010

An important industry in the town was Cadbury's chocolate factory, the Somerdale Factory. The J. S. Fry & Sons business merged with Cadbury in 1919, and moved their factory in the centre of Bristol to Keynsham in 1935. As Quakers, Cadbury's built the factory on a 228-acre (0.92 km^{2}) greenfield site with social facilities, including playing fields and recreational sports grounds. Called Somerdale after a national competition in 1923, Keynsham Cadbury was the home of Fry's Chocolate Cream, the Double Decker, Dairy Milk and Mini Eggs, Cadbury's Fudge, Chomp and Crunchie.

On 3 October 2007, Cadbury announced plans to close the Somerdale plant by 2010 with the loss of some 500 jobs. Production was to be moved to factories in Birmingham and Poland, and in the longer term it was expected that the site would be redeveloped for housing. Labour MP for Wansdyke, Dan Norris, said "news of the factory's closure is a hard and heavy blow, not just to the workforce, but to the Keynsham community as a whole". By late 2007 campaigns to save the Cadbury's factory in Somerdale were in full swing, and one local resident started a campaign to urge English Heritage to protect the site and preserve the history of the factory.

In 2009 the US corporation Kraft made a takeover bid for Cadbury. Cadbury's were seen as iconic of British manufacturing industry, and the bid became a cause célèbre of national interest. To sweeten their case before the Monopolies Commission, Kraft made a pledge to keep the Cadbury factory at Somerdale open if they were successful in their bid for the company; and their bid was duly successful. However, within a week of completing their purchase of Cadbury, Kraft CEO Irene Rosenfeld released a statement announcing that Kraft were to close the factory by 2011, as originally planned by Cadbury. The stated reason for this was that it was only after the purchase had been made that Kraft realised how advanced Cadbury's plans were, but industry experts questioned this, arguing that Kraft invested so much in researching their bid for Cadbury that they should have been aware of the extent to which plans had been advanced.

== Culture ==
In 1969 the town was featured as the title of the fourth album Keynsham by the Bonzo Dog Band. The title was chosen in honour of Horace Batchelor, who had been referenced in previous Bonzo Dog Band recordings. In the early 1960s, Batchelor became known through his regular advertisements on Radio Luxembourg for his football pools prediction service. When giving his contact address, he would slowly spell out 'Keynsham' letter by letter, and this became an amusing feature for many young listeners.

Keynsham Festival, which started in the late 1990s, takes place in the Memorial Park each July, and attracts around 16,000 people. There is also a Victorian evening held in the town each November. This has since been renamed Keynsham Winter Festival. Keynsham and Saltford local history society was formed in 1965 and is concerned with researching and recording the history of the area.

Keynsham was chosen as the outdoor location for a dramatic story-line in the BBC One TV serial EastEnders in September 2012 with filming taking place in a cordoned-off section of the High Street.

In Northanger Abbey by Jane Austen, Catherine and her friends ride to ″within view of the town of Keynsham″.

== Media ==
Local television news programmes are covered by BBC Points West and ITV News West Country which both broadcast from Bristol.

Local radio stations are BBC Radio Bristol on 94.9 FM, Heart West on 96.3 FM, Greatest Hits Radio Bristol & The South West on 107.2 FM, Hits Radio Bristol on 106.5 FM, Kiss on 97.2 FM and KTCRfm, which is an Ofcom licensed community station which broadcast from the town on 105.8 FM, DAB and also online.

The town is served by the local newspaper, Bristol Post (formerly Bristol Observer). Historically it was also served by the Keynsham Weekly Chronicle whose stories were derived from the Bath Chronicle.

== Transport ==
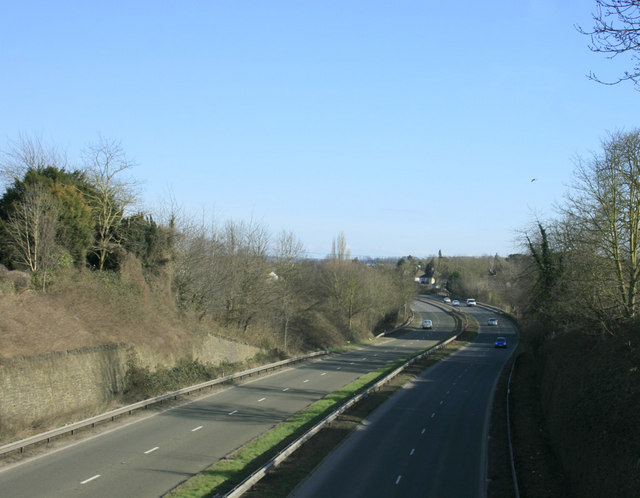
Keynsham A4 Bypass

The town is served by Keynsham railway station on the London-Bristol and Bristol-Southampton trunk routes. It opened in 1840 and was renamed Keynsham and Somerdale in 1925. The chocolate factory had its own rail system which was connected to the main line, but the connection was taken out of use 26–27 July 1980. The station's name reverted to Keynsham on 6 May 1974. The station was rebuilt in 1985 as a joint project between British Rail and Avon County Council.

The A4 trunk road used to run through the town, but much of this traffic is now carried on the bypass, which was constructed in 1964. The bypass runs from Saltford, a village which adjoins Keynsham, to Brislington in Bristol. Keynsham is about 10 miles (16 km) from junction 1 of the M32 via the Avon Ring Road A4174 and provides a fast route to the M4 and M5.

Keynsham is on the Monarch's Way long-distance footpath which approximates the escape route taken by King Charles II in 1651 after being defeated in the Battle of Worcester.

In May 2017, the High Street was made one-way for traffic heading towards Saltford and Bath with all Bristol-bound diverted along Ashton Way. There is now no access to Temple Street from High Street with the exception of buses and taxis, all traffic for Temple Street is diverted along Ashton Way.

The town is served by 6 bus routes across 3 operators, 1 of which connects Bath with Bristol International Airport and another bus service runs from Ashton Way at the back of the shops to Southmead Hospital. In order of route number and sorted by operator:

First Bristol, Bath and the West:

- A4 Bath to Bristol Airport
- 17 Keynsham to Southmead Hospital
- 39 Bristol to Bath
- 42 Keynsham to Bristol
- 43 Keynsham to North Common
- 522 Bristol to Bath via Radstock

The Big Lemon:

- K1 North Keynsham to South-West Keynsham

All buses towards Bristol and Southmead use the bus stop on Ashton Way at the back of the shops, whilst all buses towards Bath use the stop on the High Street opposite the Post Office.

== Education ==
State-funded schools are organised within the unitary authority of Bath and North East Somerset. A review of Secondary Education in Bath was started in 2007, primarily to reduce surplus provision and reduce the number of single-sex secondary schools in Bath, and to access capital funds available through the government's Building Schools for the Future programme. There are five primary schools in Keynsham, St John's Primary School, Castle Primary School, Chandag Primary School (formerly separate Infant and Junior schools until 2023), St Keyna Primary School (formed when Keynsham Primary School and 150 year old Temple Primary School merged in 2007) and Two Rivers CofE Primary School which opened in 2019. There are also three secondary schools: Wellsway; Broadlands; and IKB Academy.

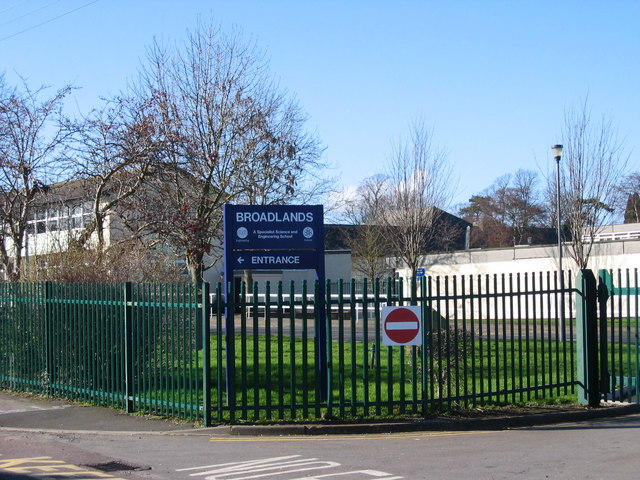
Broadlands School

Wellsway School is an 11–18, mixed comprehensive school which was established in 1971, by amalgamating Keynsham Grammar School and Wellsway County Secondary School both of which opened on a shared site in the mid-1950s. Most students that attend the school live in Keynsham and Saltford or the nearby villages. As of 2014, approximately 1335 students attend the school, ranging in age of 11–18, with 64% achieving 5 or more A-C grades at GCSE. Wellsway's bid for specialist school status was accepted in September 2007. In 2013 it became an academy and was the founder school of Wellsway Multi Academy Trust which later rebranded itself as Futura Learning Partner in September 2021.

Broadlands Academy became an academy in 2012. It has 430 students between the ages of 11 and 16 years.

IKB Academy opened in September 2015, and has a focus on Science, Technology, Engineering, and Maths (STEM) subjects. It is a studio school for pupils aged 14–19, and offers GCSEs, A Levels, and BTECs, in conjunction with weekly or fortnightly work placements.

Nearby Bath has two universities. The University of Bath was established in 1966. It is known, academically, for the physical sciences, mathematics, architecture, management and technology. Bath Spa University was first granted degree-awarding powers in 1992 as a university college (Bath Spa University College), before being granted university status in August 2005. It has schools in Art and Design, Education, English and Creative Studies, Historical and Cultural Studies, Music and the Performing Arts, and Social Sciences. The city contains one further education college, City of Bath College, and several sixth forms as part of both state, private, and public schools. In England, on average in 2006, 45.8% of pupils gained 5 grades A-C including English and Maths; for Bath and North East Somerset pupils taking GCSE at 16 it is 52.0%. Special needs education is provided by Three Ways School.

== Religious sites ==
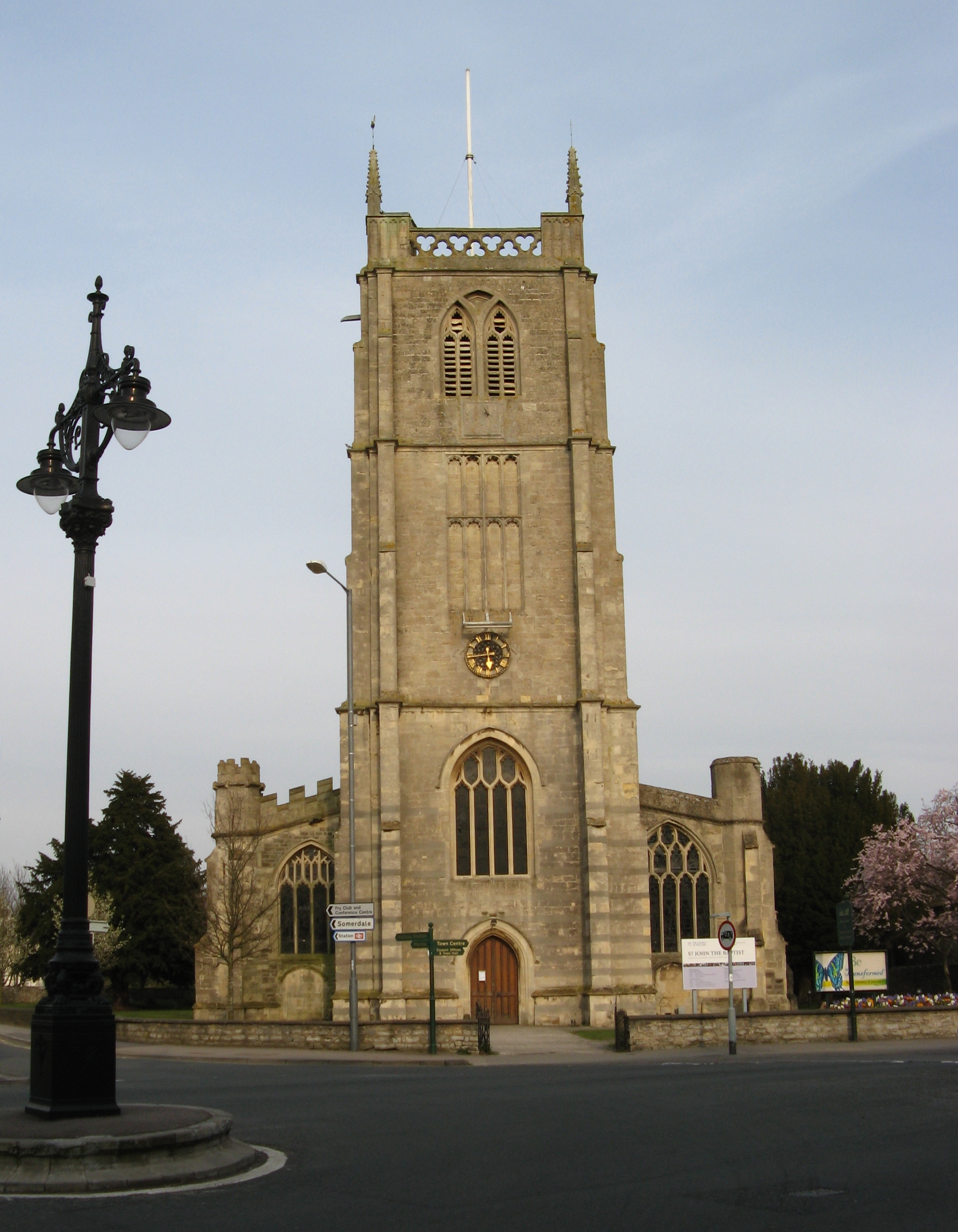
Church of St John the Baptist, Keynsham

Begun in 1292, the Church of England parish church of St John the Baptist, Keynsham gradually evolved until taking its present general form during the reign of Charles I, after the tower collapsed into the building during a storm in 1632. The tower, built over the north-east corner of the nave, now rises in three stages over the Western entrance and is surmounted by a pierced parapet and short crocketted pinnacles and is said to have been built from the ruins of the abbey church. The south aisle and south porch date from 1390. The chancel, then the responsibility of the abbey, was rebuilt in 1470 and further restoration was carried out in 1634–1655, following the collapse of the tower. There is a pulpit dating from 1634 and is also a screen of the same age which shuts off the choir vestry. It has been designated as a Grade II* listed building.

A former organ is said to have stood in the church, but "had tones so mellow" that Handel bargained for it, offering a peal of bells in exchange. The offer was accepted. The musician went off with the organ and the bells were delivered. There are eight bells in total, some made by the Bilbie family of Chew Stoke, the smallest bears these lines:

"I value not who doth me see
For Thomas Bilbie casted me;
Althow my sound it is but small
I can be heard amongst you all."

St John the Baptist church is one of five churches in the Church of England Parish of Keynsham, the others being the village churches of St Michael's in Burnett and St Margaret's in Queen Charlton, the "Mission Church" in Chewton Keynsham (formerly the school building), and St Francis' Church on the Park Estate which in 2013 - 2015 underwent extensive modernisation and offers two halls for use by community groups.

There are also the Victoria and Queens Road Methodist churches, St Dunstan's Roman Catholic Church and an Elim Church. The churches work together, also with churches in Saltford, under the banner of "Churches Together in Keynsham and Saltford" and often with the strapline "More to Life". Keynsham Baptist Church, built 1834, is set back from the High Street with a paved courtyard in front.

== Sport ==
Keynsham Cricket Club play at the Frank Taylor Memorial Ground, their 1st XI compete in the West of England Premier League Division 2. Marcus Trescothick is the most noticeable player to have played for the club. His family remain members of the club, which incorporates over 100 senior members and 100 junior members.

Keynsham Rugby Football Club play at Crown Field. The club's most notable and tragic event occurred on 24 December 1992, when there was a fatal road accident outside the club's ground. A Ford Fiesta car ploughed into 11 people leaving the annual festive disco. One woman, 21-year-old Sarah Monnelle, died at the scene. A second person, 24-year-old rugby player Richard Barnett, died in hospital two days later from his injuries. Clive Sutton was later found guilty on a double charge of causing death by dangerous driving and sentenced to four years in prison at Bristol Crown Court.

Keynsham Hockey Club play at Wellsway School. The club currently runs 3 ladies’, 2 men's and 1 mixed team, plus 5 youth teams at various age groups for children aged 7 and upwards. The club was formerly known as Fry's Hockey Club and had existed for nearly 100 years. Fry's Hockey Club was based at Fry Club on the Somervale site for Fry's, then Cadbury's before it closed in 2012. Hockey was played at the site from the 1920s when the Fry's chocolate factory reputedly had more than 15 ladies teams. By the 1970s the club had shrunk to only two ladies' teams whose games were played only as friendlies on a Saturday using a grass pitch. Since then, the club has grown to its present structure.

Keynsham Town F.C. were founded in 1895. They have played continuously apart from a break during World War II and moved to their current ground, the Crown Field, in 1945. They first played in the Bristol & District League and progressed through the Bristol Combination, Bristol Premier and Somerset Senior League and won the Somerset Senior Cup in 1951–52 and 1957–58. They were elected to the Western League in 1973 but were relegated three years later in 1976. Since then they have been promoted to the Premier Division three times and relegated three times. They won the Somerset Senior Cup for the third time in 2002–03 and reached the 5th round of the FA Vase in 2003–04. They currently play in the Western Football League Division 1.

There is a bowls club situated at the Memorial Park. The Fry Tennis Club has courts located within the town's Somerdale estate. Keynsham leisure centre was built in 1965 by British Gas as a gift to the town. It includes a swimming pool, gymnasium and sauna.

== Notable residents ==
Several notable people have been born or lived in Keynsham. The comedian Bill Bailey was raised in the town. Another entertainer, Neil Forrester, who was a research assistant and became known as a cast member on The Real World: London, was also a local. Children's author Mimi Thebo has been resident since 2002. Sports players from Keynsham include Mark Regan a professional rugby player and a former player at Keynsham Rugby Football Club, Luke Sutton of Lancashire County Cricket Club who played as both a wicket-keeper and batsman, Marcus Trescothick, the Somerset and England cricketer. and Judd Trump, a professional snooker player. Horace Batchelor, who sold a system for the football pools, lived in Keynsham, making the town famous by spelling its name in his regular advertisements on Radio Luxembourg. Lewis Brindley, founder of The Yogscast, has been a resident since 2026.
