= Keynsham Civic Centre =

Municipal building in Keynsham, Somerset, England

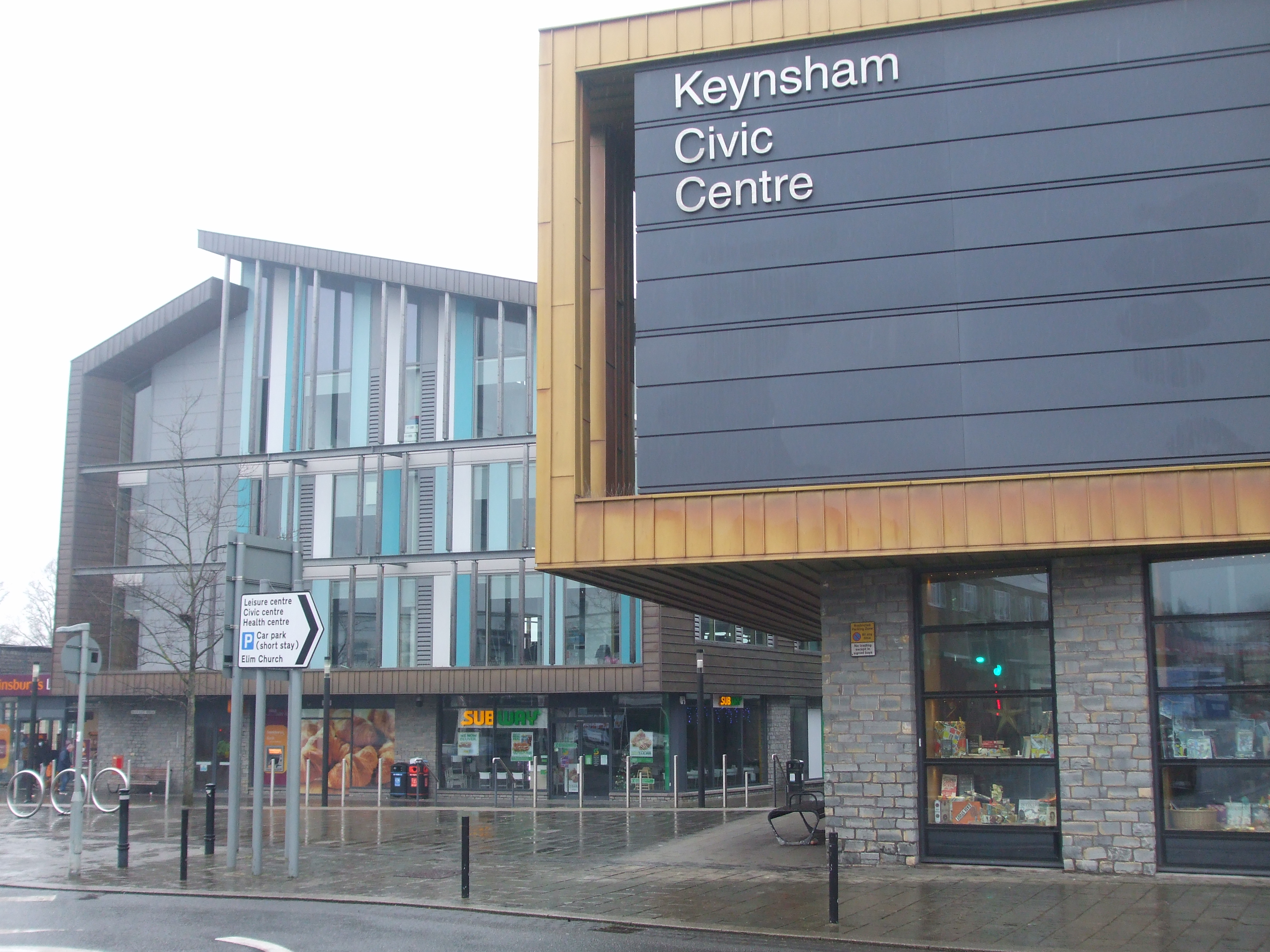
- The larger retail and office building (on the left) and the library and community centre building (on the right) in 2021

- Shown in Somerset
- 51.4139°N 2.4976°W
- Location: Temple Street, Keynsham

History
- Built: 2015

Site notes
- Architect: AHR
- Architectural style: Modern style

Keynsham Civic Centre is a municipal building in Keynsham, a town in Somerset, in England. The complex includes a library and community centre building known as Keynsham Town Hall.

== History ==
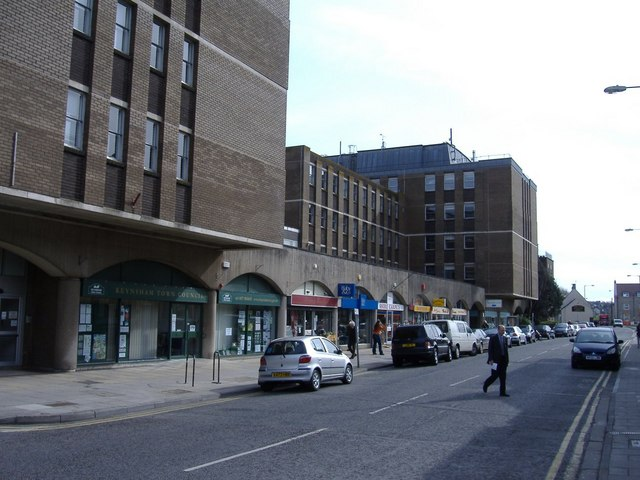
The old 1960s structures in 2007

Following significant population growth, largely associated with the chocolate manufacturing industry, an urban district council was formed in Keynsham in 1938. The new council initially met in the Church Rooms at the Church of St John the Baptist, although they moved to the old library (formerly the Liberal Club) on Bath Street West after the Second World War.

In the early 1960s, with the increasing responsibilities of local authorities, the council decided to commission dedicated offices. The site that they selected was a large area on the east side of Temple Street. The area was occupied by some old terraced houses, which were cleared away, and a time capsule, containing documents and memorabilia, was buried. The new complex, which involved a town hall, council offices, a library, and a clock tower, was designed in the brutalist style, built in concrete and was completed in the mid-1960s. It continued to serve as the offices of Keynsham Urban District Council for the next decade, and was used as the meeting place of Wansdyke District Council when it was formed in 1974. However it ceased to be the local seat of government when the new unitary authority, Bath and North East Somerset Council, was formed in Bath in 1996. However, the unitary authority continued to use the complex at Keynsham for the provision of local services.

In 2012, Bath and North East Somerset Council decided to demolish the 1960s structures, and replace them with a new civic centre, including a library and community centre, and a larger retail and office building. The site for the new complex was about 100 yards (91 m) further north along Temple Street. During demolition works on the old structures the old time capsule was found and reburied with more up to date artifacts. The new buildings were designed by AHR in the modern style, built by Willmott Dixon and were completed in 2015. They won a British Council for Offices Award for their design.

In 2021, the offices were refurbished at a cost of £1.6 million, to allow council employees from outlying buildings to relocate to them.

== Architecture ==
The buildings are constructed of reinforced concrete and cross-laminated timber. The library and community centre building is known as Keynsham Town Hall and is a two-storey building, while the larger retail and office building has a single-storey plinth, with three interlinked three-storey office blocks above. The design of the library and community centre building involves an asymmetrical main frontage facing onto Temple Street. It features, on the first floor at the north end, a rectangular gold-coloured box, manufactured from cross-laminated timber, which is jettied out over the pavement. Meanwhile, the larger building features a pitched roof broken by a system of clerestory windows to assist ventilation. The buildings were designed to be highly energy efficient, making use of natural ventilation, thermal mass and daylight. Within the town hall are mosaics from the Keynsham Roman Villa.
