= Keynsham Humpy Tumps =

Coordinates: 51.42653°N 2.51214°W

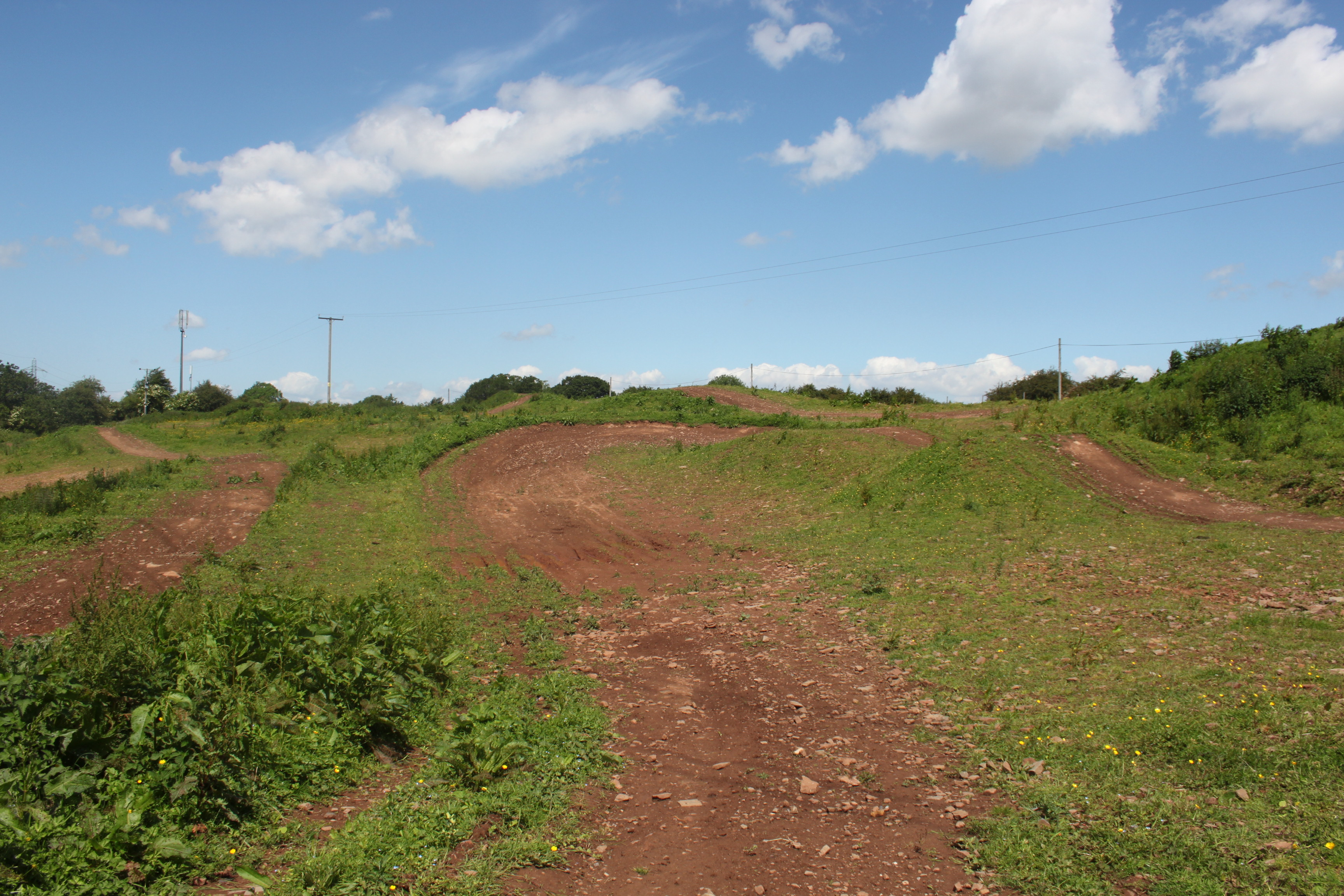
Keynsham Humpy Tumps showing the erosion by motorcycle scrambling

Keynsham Humpy Tumps is a floristically rich acidic grassland site situated between the town of Keynsham, and the River Avon, southeast of Bristol, England.

The site is on a south-facing slope running alongside the Bristol to Bath railway line. It consists of open patches of grassland and bare rock, interspersed with blocks of scrub.

It is the only site in Avon at which Upright Chickweed Moenchia erecta, occurs. Other locally notable plant species found here include Annual Knawel, Sand Spurrey, Subterranean Clover Trifolium subterraneus and Prickly Sedge Carex muricata ssp. lamprocarpa.

The site does not have any statutory conservation status, and is not managed for its biodiversity interest. Threats to its ecological value include the encroachment of scrub onto the grassland areas, and damage from motorcycle scrambling.

Some parts are privately owned, though a public path crosses from north to south. Most of the land is regularly landscaped, in connection with the motorcycle activities; the rare plants survive only in a narrow band along the north edge of the site.

== Bibliography ==
- Myles, Sarah (2000) The Flora of the Bristol Region ISBN 1-874357-18-8
