= Lift Broadlands =

Location
- St Francis Road; Keynsham, Bath and North East Somerset, BS31 2DY; England; 51.4170°N 2.5093°W

Information
- Type: Academy
- Established: Broadlands School 1935; Broadlands Academy 2012; Lift Broadlands 2025
- Trust: Lift Schools
- Department for Education URN: 138985 Tables
- Ofsted: Reports
- Principal: Laura Stone
- Gender: Mixed
- Age: 11 to 16
- Enrolment: 603
- Capacity: 1085
- Houses: Draco; Orion; Ursa; Pegasus
- Colours: Navy Blue, Red.
- Website: http://broadlandsacademy.org/

Lift Broadlands is a secondary school in Keynsham, Bath and North East Somerset, England. Formerly known as Broadlands School founded in 1935, the academy opened in December 2012. The school, which had specialist Science College and Engineering College status, has 603 students between the ages of 11 and 16 years, as of 2019.

The academy is located near the north-west edge of the Bath and North East Somerset local authority area, and attracts many of its pupils from outside the local authority area. In 2006, 69% of pupils came from Bristol and South Gloucestershire. This led the local authority to consider amalgamating the school with the nearby Wellsway School, though in 2010 a decision was made not to proceed with this proposal.

In July 2012, Justine Hocking (who worked alongside students and staff to ensure that the school would remain open in 2010) stepped down as head after working at the school for 10 years.

Broadlands converted to an academy with the Academies Enterprise Trust in December 2012. Dean Anderson took over from Richard Williams (interim head Sep – Dec 2012) as headteacher in January 2013. James Hall was the head of the school since 2017. In July 2020, the principal was Louise Hamilton. As of 2026, the principal is Laura Stone.

The school changed its name to Lift Broadlands following a rebrand in 2025.
