= Bridges Almshouses =

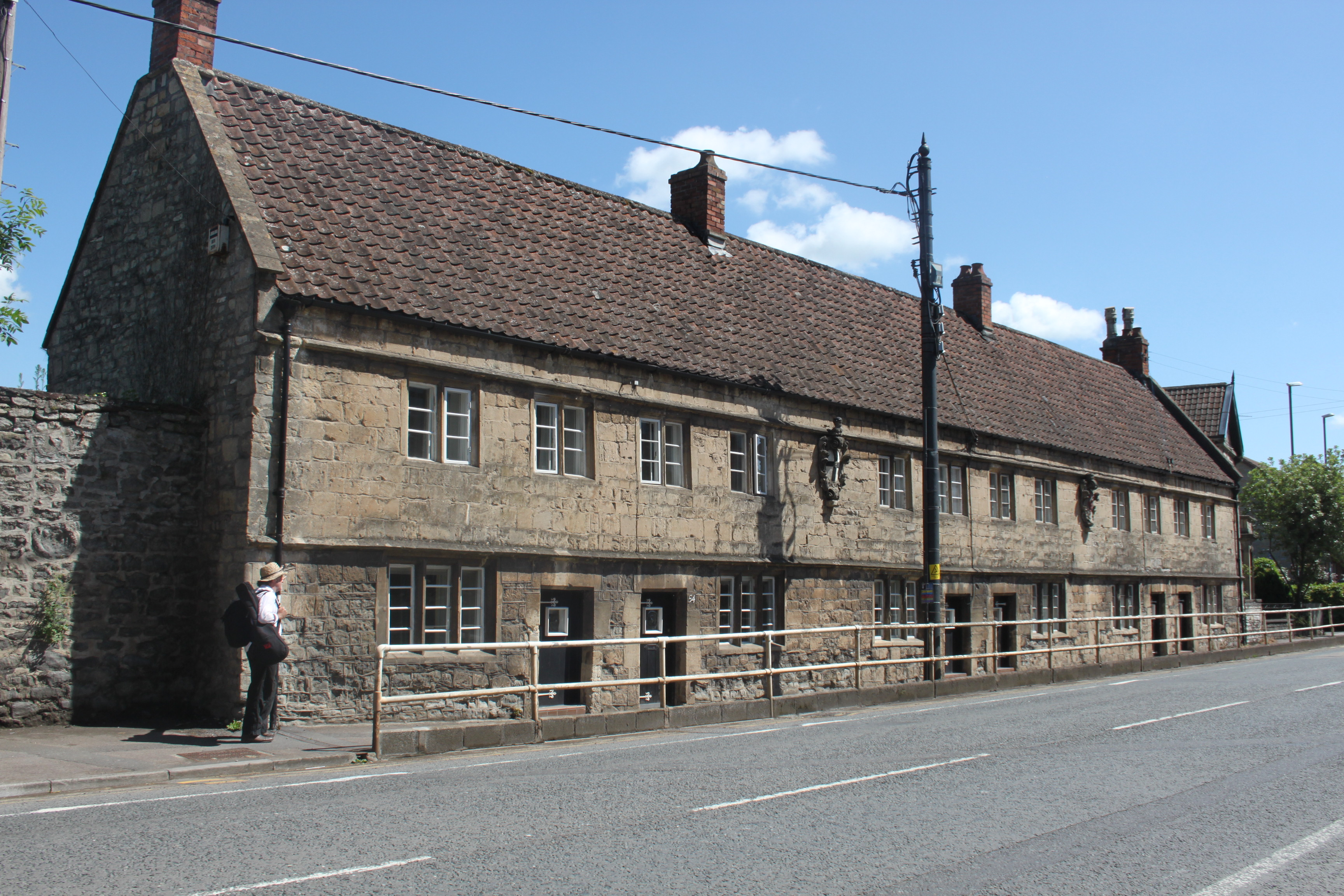

- Location within Somerset
- 51°25′06″N 2°30′18″W
- Location: Keynsham, Somerset, England

History
- Built: c. 1685

Listed Building – Grade II
- Official name: Bridges Almshouses
- Designated: 27 February 1950
- Reference no.: 1384596

The Bridges Almshouses in Keynsham within the English county of Somerset were built around 1685. They have been designated as a Grade II listed building.

The Almshouses were built by Sir Thomas Bridges and his wife Lady Anna Bridges (née Rodney) to provide accommodation for six widows and endowed a school for the town. This may have initially been for the widows of men killed in the Monmouth Rebellion.

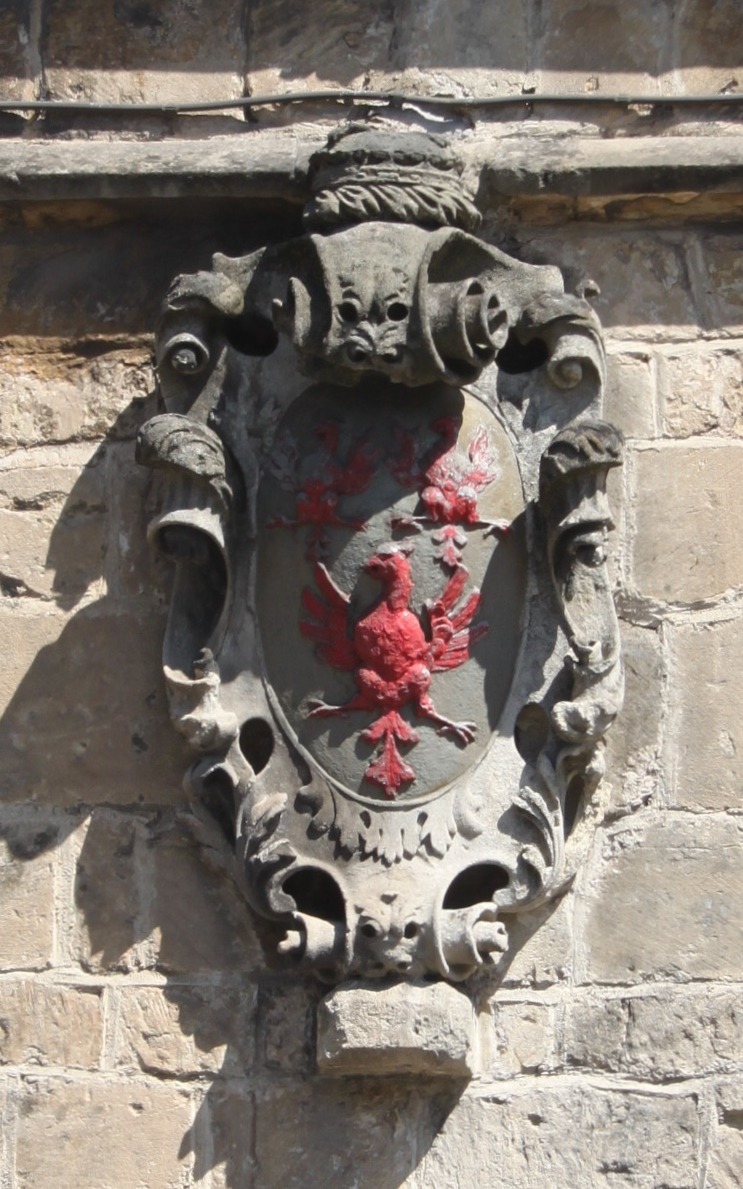
The arms of Lady Anna Bridges (née Rodney)

The terrace is made of three pairs of two-storey houses. They are constructed of limestone with moulded stone mullions over the two and three light windows, surmounted by pantile roof. On the front of the building are cartouches with the arms of Bridges and his wife.

The Bristol Road in front of the almshouse has been built over the original gardens and the level of the road has been raised so that the doors and footpath are below the level of the carriageway.
