= Horace Batchelor =

English gambling advertiser

- Born: 22 January 1898; Bedminster, Bristol, England
- Died: 8 January 1977 (aged 78)

Horace Cyril Batchelor (22 January 1898 – 8 January 1977) was an English gambling advertiser. He was best known during the 1950s and 1960s as an advertiser on Radio Luxembourg. He advertised a way to win money by predicting the results of football matches, sponsoring programmes on the station. His spelling out of Keynsham, a town in western England where he operated, made it famous.

== The "Famous Infra-Draw Method" ==
Batchelor sponsored programmes on Radio Luxembourg to promote his "Famous Infra-Draw Method", a system that he claimed increased the chances of winning large sums on the football pools. Before the National Lottery started in 1994, the "Pools" was the only way to win large sums for a small stake. Listeners were asked to submit their stakes to Batchelor, who then determined how the stake was placed. He was paid only if the bet won. Infra-draw was thus not dependent on his predictive talent for its financial success.

== Advertising on Radio Luxembourg ==
Radio Luxembourg was a music station broadcasting to Britain from Luxembourg as a way to circumvent the BBC's national monopoly and the policy in the United Kingdom of no broadcast advertising. The station played pop music promoted by record companies. The advertisers were allowed to buy air time in units of 15 minutes. Batchelor's programme usually featured the Deep River Boys, a gospel/barbershop group seemingly performing live. He voiced his own advertisements, inviting listeners to write for details of his "Famous Infra-Draw Method for the Treble Chance" that he promised was able to predict the drawn games on which winnings depended.

The address was always read as "Horace Batchelor, Department One, Keynsham, spelt K-E-Y-N-S-H-A-M, Keynsham, Bristol". Batchelor needed to carefully spell Keynsham out loud for his listeners (and prospective clients), as the town's name is pronounced CANE-sham, and its spelling is not obvious from the way that it is pronounced. Batchelor's slow, very deliberate spelling and repeated mentions of Keynsham on his programme led to the town's name becoming something of a meme.

== Personal life ==
Batchelor was a watercolour painter of many subjects. His studio was the entertainment room at the side of a detached house, a sparsely furnished, bow-windowed room with cocktail bar and steel shutters. He spent his last years mainly in one small room equipped with a chaise longue and two televisions, one colour, the other monochrome, rented from Granada TV Rental at Knowle, Bristol. His housekeeper communicated with visitors and tradesmen. His son Richard took over the business of results prediction. Following his death in 1977, The Times published his will on 3 March of that year, showing he left just under £150,000.

== In culture ==
=== Bonzo Dog Doo-Dah Band ===
The Bonzo Dog Doo-Dah Band named an album Keynsham. The Bonzos referenced Batchelor on other occasions as well: Batchelor's voice is imitated at the start of the Bonzos' song "You Done My Brain In", (the opening track on the Keynsham album) saying "I have personally won over..."; and his is one of the names listed as a spoof band member in The Intro and the Outro, the opening track on the second side of the album Gorilla.

=== Play ===
An Audience with Horace Batchelor by playwright Kevin Cattell and starring Roland Oliver played at Tobacco Factory Theatres in July/August 2013, and was revived for the Salisbury Playhouse in April 2014.
