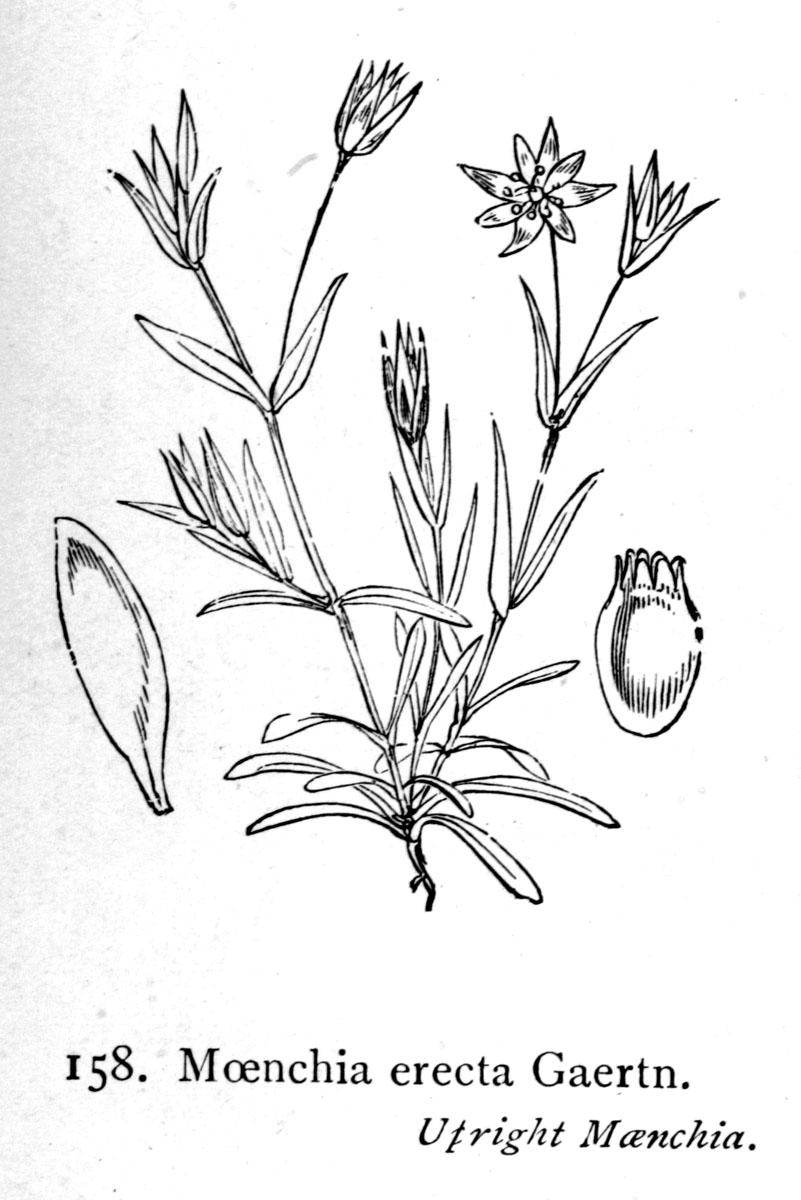

Scientific classification
- Kingdom: Plantae
- Clade: Tracheophytes
- Clade: Angiosperms
- Clade: Eudicots
- Order: Caryophyllales
- Family: Caryophyllaceae
- Genus: Moenchia
- Species: M. erecta

Binomial name
- Moenchia erecta (L.) P.Gaertn., B.Mey. & Scherb.

Synonyms
- Alsine erecta (L.) Crantz; Alsine quaternella (Ehrh.) E.H.L.Krause; Alsinella erecta (L.) Moench; Cerastium erectum (L.) Coss. & Germ.; Cerastium erectum Cosson & Germ.; Cerastium octandrum (Ziz ex Mert. & W.D.J.Koch) E.G.Camus [nom. illeg.]; Cerastium quaternellum Fenzl; Doerriena erecta (L.) Borkh.; Malachium erectum (L.) Gren.; Malachium octandrum (Ziz ex Mert. & W.D.J.Koch) Gren.; Moenchia octandra (Ziz ex Mert. & W.D.J.Koch) J.Gay; Sagina erecta L.; Sagina octandra Ziz ex Mert. & W.D.J.Koch

= Moenchia erecta =

Species of flowering plant

Moenchia erecta, the erect chickweed or upright chickweed (though the latter name may refer to any species of Moenchia), is a small annual plant in the family Caryophyllaceae. It can grow to over 10 cm in height, but it is usually smaller. It has blue-green glaucous leaves, and small, delicate white flowers. The sepals are longer than the petals, green and bordered in white. The plant is a common pasture weed native to Europe. It has been introduced elsewhere, including Australia and western North America, but it is not particularly invasive or competitive.

In areas where it has been introduced, it springs up opportunistically in gardens, mowed fields, and other disturbed areas. It prefers moist places, such as grassy floodplains near marshes and coastal hills. The plant grows well in bare, sandy, gravelly soils, such as those at shorelines or on overgrazed fields.
