= North Common =

North Common may refer to several places in England:

- North Common, East Sussex
- North Common, Gloucestershire
- North Common, Suffolk, a United Kingdom location
