= Church of St John the Baptist, Keynsham =

Church in Somerset, England

Church of St John the Baptist
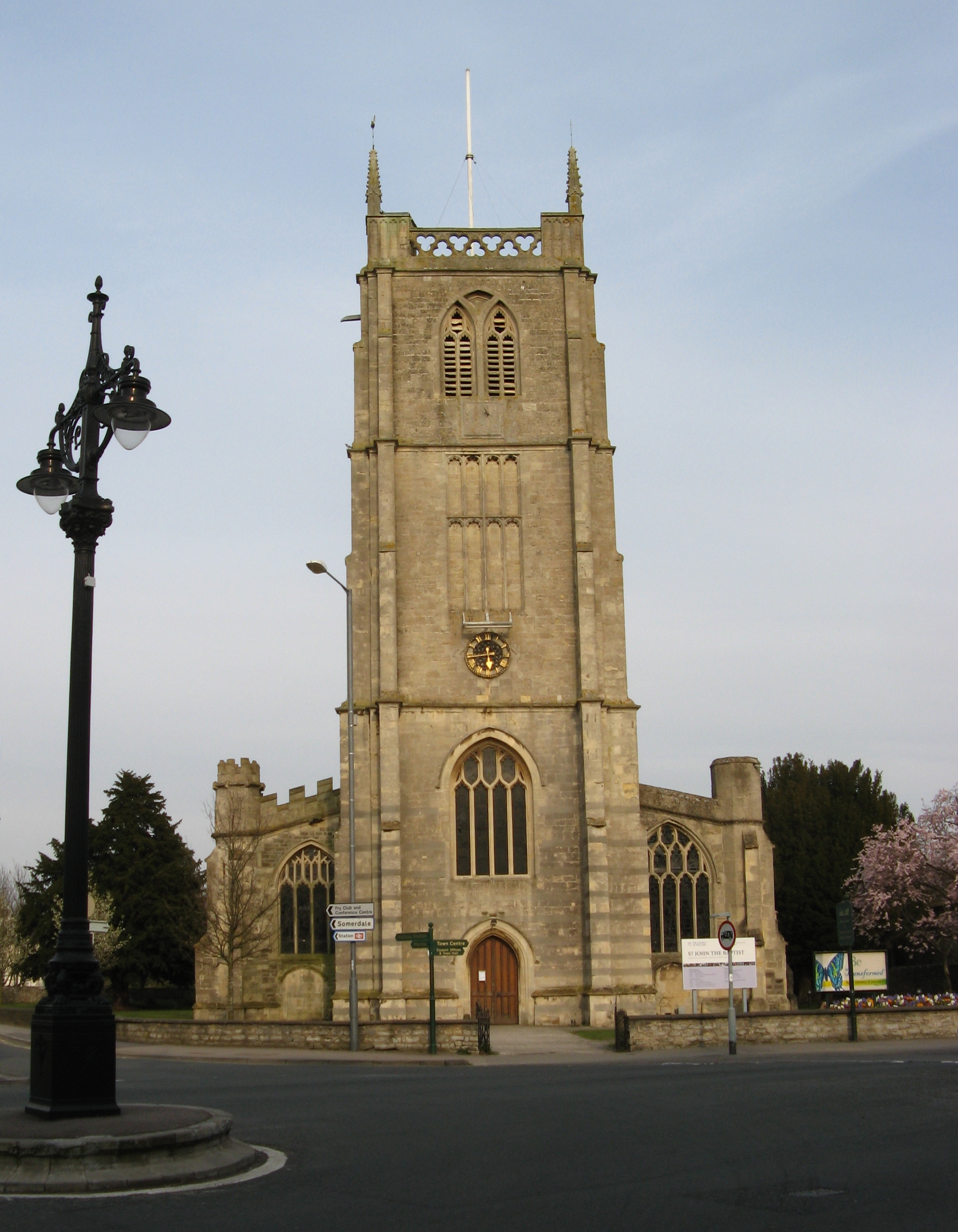

- Location within Somerset
- 51°25′03″N 2°29′55″W
- Location: Keynsham Somerset, England

History
- Built: c. 1270

Listed Building – Grade II*
- Designated: 27 February 1950
- Reference no.: 1384628

The Church of St John the Baptist, is an Anglican parish church in Keynsham, Somerset, England. It was built around 1270 and has been designated as a Grade II* listed building.

The church was originally closely associated with Keynsham Abbey until its dissolution in 1539. In 1632 the spire collapsed and a new bell tower was built at the western end of the church. Restoration and renovation work, under several vicars, has been ongoing since then as the parish and congregation rose and fell. The church has been involved in local and international charity work and in the 1970s a team ministry approach was adopted.

The stone church includes historic fixtures such as the pulpit, font and brass chandeliers. The organ has grown and been moved since its installation in 1847. There is a story that Handel acquired a previous organ in exchange for two bells, however this is unsubstantiated. The bells in the tower date from the 16th, 17th and 18th centuries.

== History ==
There was a minster church at Keynsham by the ninth century. In the 12th century Keynsham Abbey was founded and served as the place of worship for the town. Around 1270 a church was built for the people of the town with the Abbey being responsible for the chancel and the town for the rest of the church, although the relationship between the abbey and townsfolk was strained at various times until the Dissolution of the Monasteries in 1539. The south aisle and south porch date from 1390. The chancel, then the responsibility of Keynsham Abbey, was rebuilt in 1470. The site of the abbey was bought by Sir Henry Bridges in 1552 and, along with his descendants, held the advowson of the church until the 18th century.

The Anglican parish church of St John the Baptist gradually evolved until taking its present general form during the reign of Charles II, after the spire over the north aisle collapsed into the building during a storm in 1632. The current tower, built over the north-east corner of the nave, now rises in three stages over the Western entrance and is surmounted by a pierced parapet and short crocketted pinnacles and is said to have been built from the ruins of the abbey church. Along with the new tower further restoration was carried out in 1634–1655, this included a new pulpit. Following the English Civil War in the 1640s the vicar Thomas Codrington received an increased stipend as part of the settlement imposed on the lord of the manor, another Thomas Bridges, for his support of the royalist cause. After the restoration of the monarchy Codrington appears to have revert to supporting the monarchy and persecuted the local quakers who had supported the parliamentary cause.

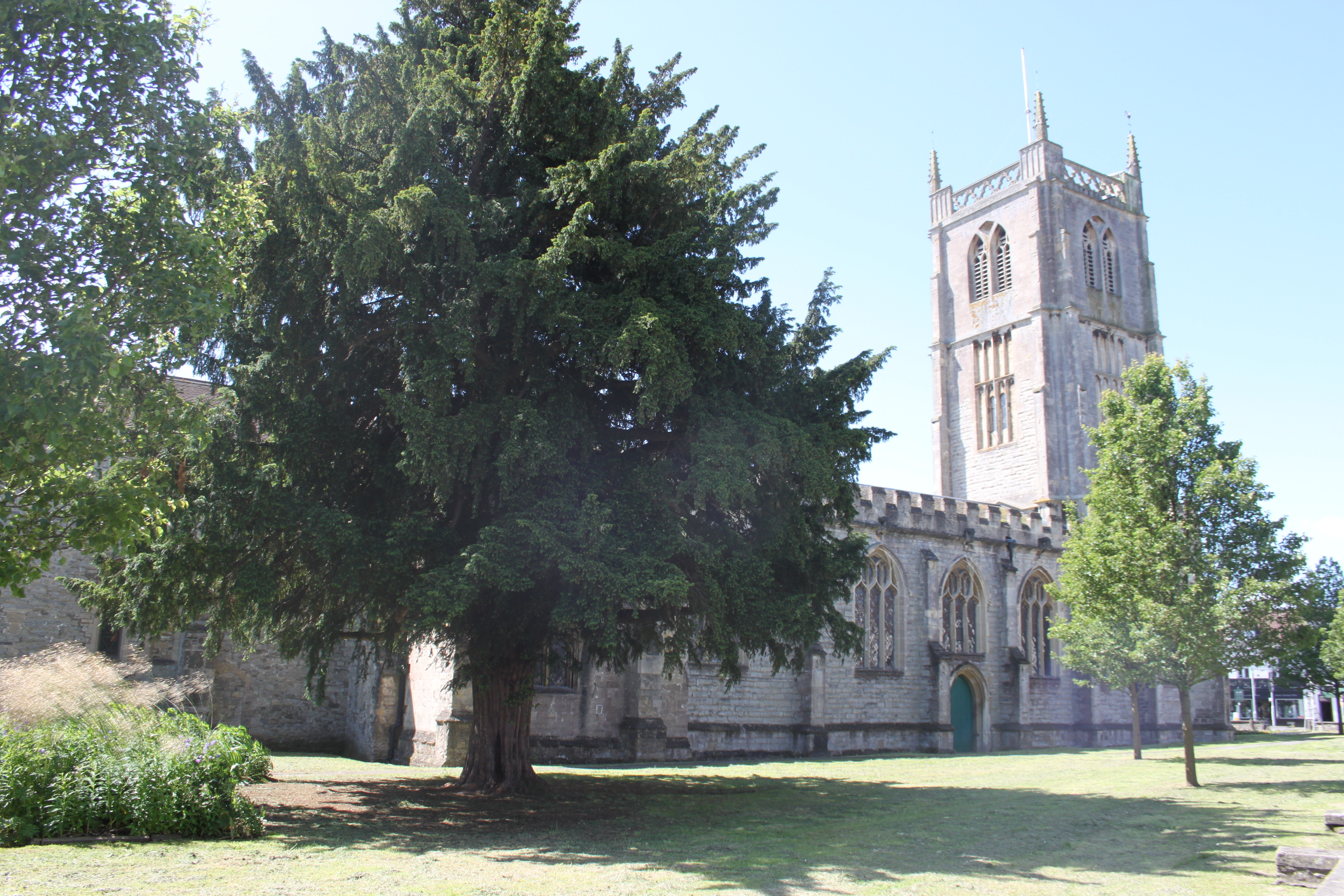
Exterior from the north

The congregation dwindled and the fabric of the church fell into disrepair during the 18th and early 19th century. In 1843 the south porch was being used as a coal store and the roof was leaking. In the 1850s George Robinson was appointed as vicar and revitalised the church. He rebuilt the vicarage for his 13 children, established a church school, and raised money for the restoration of the church itself. This included the removal of box pews, restoration of the windows and rebuilding of the arches in the nave. Gas lighting was installed, the roof rebuilt and walls re-plastered. The total cost was about £4,000 and much of the restoration work was undertaken by Benjamin Ferrey 1861–1863. In parallel with the restoration of the building the number of services increased and the congregation grew despite some conflicts with parishioners about his style of preaching. Robinson left in 1870 and was replaced by Joseph Gray who continued to develop the church and its charitable works both locally and in support of missionaries around the world. During his incumbency the churchyard became full and a new cemetery was developed.

In the 20th century the population of Keynsham grew, partly due to the construction of the Somerdale Factory. Douglas Percival Hatchard, who had taken over as the vicar in 1901, continued work on the church school and raised money for the restoration of the church. Heating was provided by the Keynsham Electric Light Company from their plant next to the church. The mission church at Chewton Keynsham continued as a dependent chapel and was often served by lay readers. After World War I a memorial was built. The vicar during World War II was Vernon Graham Havergal Shaw. He was pacifist which brought him into conflict with members of the church council and churchwardens as they thought prayers should be said for the troops, however the vicar disagreed. He left the parish in 1945 and was replaced by Trevor Wright, who was in charge when further problems were uncovered in the church during the 1950s. The woodwork was affected by deathwatch beetle and wet rot and repair work costing over £15,000 was needed. Mervyn Wedgewood took over as the vicar in 1956 as the town expanded further. He led the establishment of new classes and groups for the population and the construction of a new church dedicated to St Francis. The old church rooms were demolished to make way for a bypass, in the 1960s and the compensation money used for the construction of a new church hall and vicarage. During the 1970s a team ministry was established.

== Architecture ==
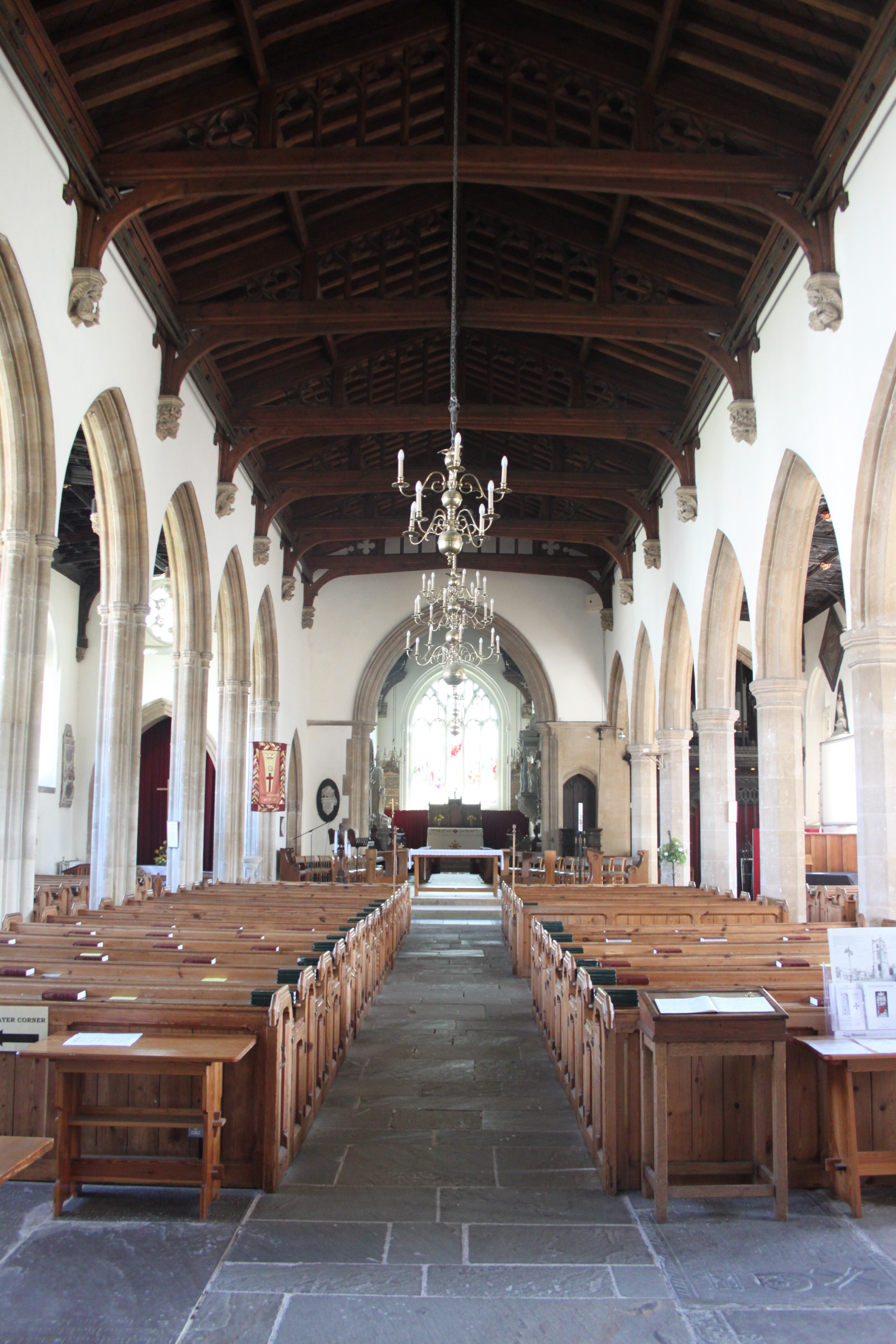
The interior and alter

The church consists of a nave of eight bays with north and south aisles, a south porch and south east vestry along with the three-stage west tower which is supported by set back buttresses. There are Hammerbeam roofs and stained glass from the 19th century restorations.

=== Fixtures ===
There is a pulpit dating from 1634 and is also a screen of the same age which shuts off the choir vestry. The small font at the front of the church was given by Harry Bridges in 1725 and the three brass chandelier, which hang in the nave, by Mrs Ann Tilly in 1717.

=== Organ ===
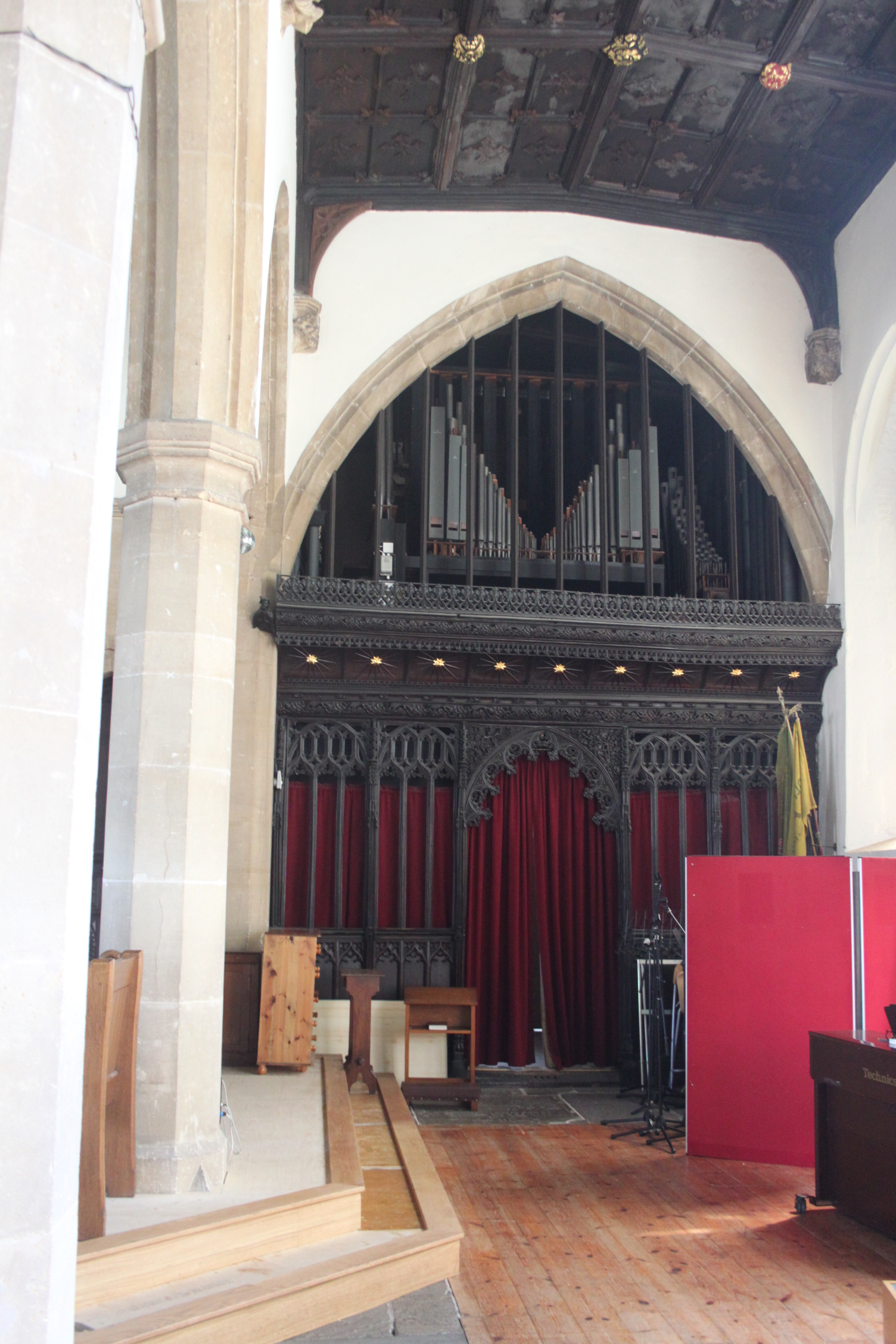
The organ

The first documentary evidence of a pipe organ in the church is from 1847 when a new instrument a 2-manual with 14 stops, by George Sherborne, was installed on the west gallery. In the 1860s it was moved to the east end of the south aisle and then, in 1880s enlarged and the console moved to the chancel with the pipes being positioned behind the screen. A clarinet was added in the 1920s and in 1939 an electric blower was added. In the 1960s a major restoration was undertaken with further work on the organ in 1986, 1991 and 2000.

A former organ is said to have stood in the church, but "had tones so mellow" that George Frideric Handel bargained for it, around 1730, offering a peal of bells in exchange. The offer was accepted. The musician went off with the organ and the bells were delivered.

=== Bells ===
Five of the eight church bells in the bell tower survive from the collapse of the spire in 1632. The oldest for which there is clear evidence is the Great Bell which was paid for by Nicholas St Loe in 1508. The Sanctus Bell of 1531 hangs in the belfry but does not form part of the peal. The present seventh bell is from 1602, the sixth from 1607 and the fourth from 1613. The third bell was added around 1654 when the tower was completed following the earlier collapse of the spire. In 1731 the Bilbie family of Chew Stoke, cast two further bells the smallest bears these lines:

"I value not who doth me see
For Thomas Bilbie casted me;
Althow my sound it is but small
I can be heard amongst you all."

In 1987 all the bells were lowered from the tower and recast by White's of Appleton and then electronically tuned by the Whitechapel Bell Foundry.

== Parish ==
St. John the Baptist church is one of four churches in the Church of England Parish of Keynsham, the others being the village churches of St. Michael's in Burnett and St. Margaret's in Queen Charlton, and St. Francis' Church on the Park Estate which in 2013–2015 underwent extensive modernisation and offers two halls for use by community groups.

The Parish of Keynsham falls within the archdeaconry of Bath.

== List of Vicars and Rectors of Keynsham ==
- c.1630s – Thomas Codrington: Vicar during the 1632 spire collapse; later noted for persecution of Quakers.
- 1850s–1870 – George Robinson: Led major church restoration (1861–63) and rebuilt vicarage.
- 1870–1893 – Joseph Henry Gray: Expanded mission and school work; died in office.
- 1901–19?? – Douglas Percival Hatchard: Oversaw electric heating installation and school work.
- 1939–1945 – Vernon Graham Havergal Shaw: Wartime vicar; pacifist, resigned in 1945.
- 1945–1956 – Trevor Wright: Managed extensive building repairs.
- 1956–1970s – Mervyn Wedgewood: Established St Francis Church and new parish facilities.
- 1975-1983 - Gordon George Bradshaw: Rector
- 1983–1992 – Richard Frith: Later Archdeacon of Taunton, Bishop of Hull, and Bishop of Hereford. The Bridges Society (now Friends of St John’s) founded during his tenure.
- 2012–2023 – Stephen M’Caw: Team Rector; retired in September 2023.
- 2025–present – Aidan Watson: Appointed Team Rector of Keynsham in 2025.

== See also ==
- List of ecclesiastical parishes in the Diocese of Bath and Wells

== Bibliography ==
- Dunning, Robert (1996). Fifty Somerset Churches. Somerset Books. ISBN 978-0861833092.
- Moore, J.; Rice, R.; Hucker, E. (1995). Bilbie and the Chew Valley clockmakers : the story of the renowned family of Somerset bellfounder-clockmakers. The authors. ISBN 9780952670209.
- White, Elizabeth (2005). St. John the Baptist, Keynsham: A History of the Church. Bridges Society, The Friends of St John the Baptist, Keynsham. ISBN 978-0953440214.
