= Keynsham Roman Villa =

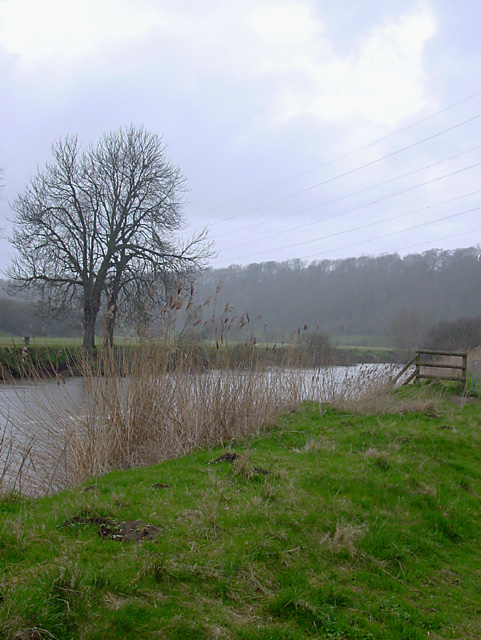
The River Avon at Keynsham Hams

Keynsham Roman Villa refers to a cluster of villas built during the Roman occupation of Britain near Keynsham in Somerset, England. Two villas have been found, the larger of which is thought to be one of the grandest villas constructed in all of Britain. The sites have never been fully excavated, in part because portions of each are located underneath a cemetery, a major road, and the now shuttered Somerdale Chocolate Factory.

== Geography of the Site ==
The remains of the villas are located in what is now known as the Keynsham Hams, an alluvial flood plain located in the River Avon Valley just south of the River Avon near the town of Keynsham in Somerset. The Hams are an open area consisting of fields, pastures, and meadows, divided by hedgerows and drainage ditches. To the north of the Hams lies the Avon River and Cleeve Wood. To the south the Hams is bordered by a railway line and the town of Keynsham. This landscape has recently been classified as a "Floodplain Grazing Marsh," and a UK BAP priority habitat, or a natural area that provides a unique range of habitats for flora and fauna. The landscape is dominated by the now shuttered Somerdale Chocolate Factory at the far east of the Hams, which was built between 1923 and 1935. The factory site was closed in 2011 and sold in 2012, and is currently being redeveloped into a housing community.

== Archaeological Excavation ==
=== The Bristol to Bath Road ===
In the 18th century, the "Great Bath Road" leading from London to the fashionable city of Bath (and eventually to Bristol) passed through this area, and the road covered over the western and southern corridors of the house with a high embankment.

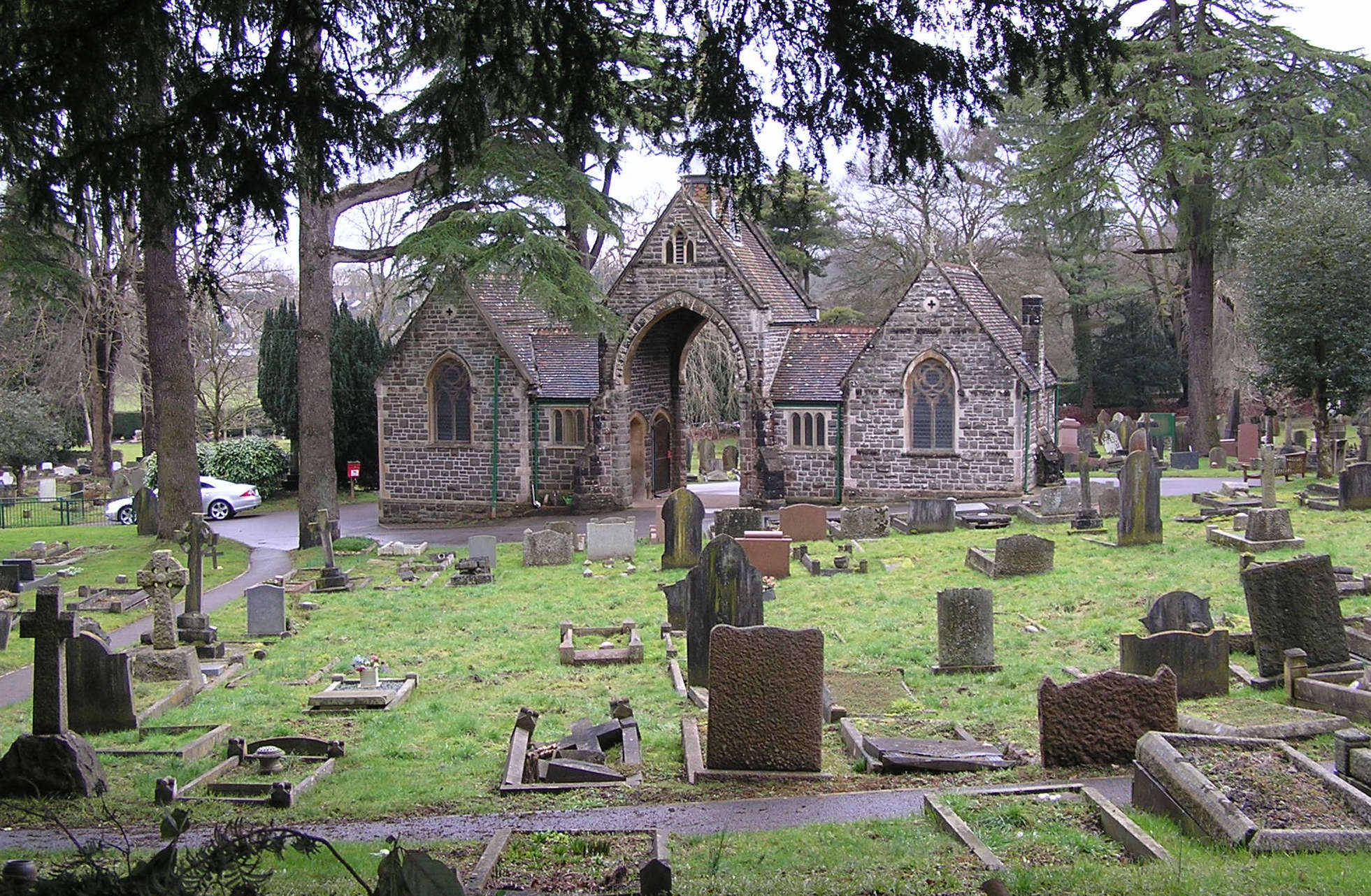
Keynsham Cemetery, which is built over the Roman Villa

=== The Victorian Cemetery ===
The first excavation of Keynsham's Roman villas was carried out in 1877, when the parish church of Saint John's ran out of burial space in the graveyard, and there was no means of enlarging it. The Vicar and the churchwardens purchased two and a half acres of land to create the new Durley Hill Cemetery in the Hams. However, when trenches were dug at the site for two mortuary buildings, workers discovered a flat pavement of white tesserae, or small stones used to form a mosaic, beneath the surface. As it turned out, these tesserae belonged to the courtyard of a high status villa, with at least 30 rooms and 10 complete mosaics. Unfortunately, despite the indications that this was a large Roman archeological site, burials began almost immediately, and continued for 40 years. From 1922 to 1924, a team carried out excavations at the cemetery site, uncovering 17 rooms. The archeological teams were able to salvage 10 elaborate 4th century mosaics before the site was destroyed to make room for more interments.

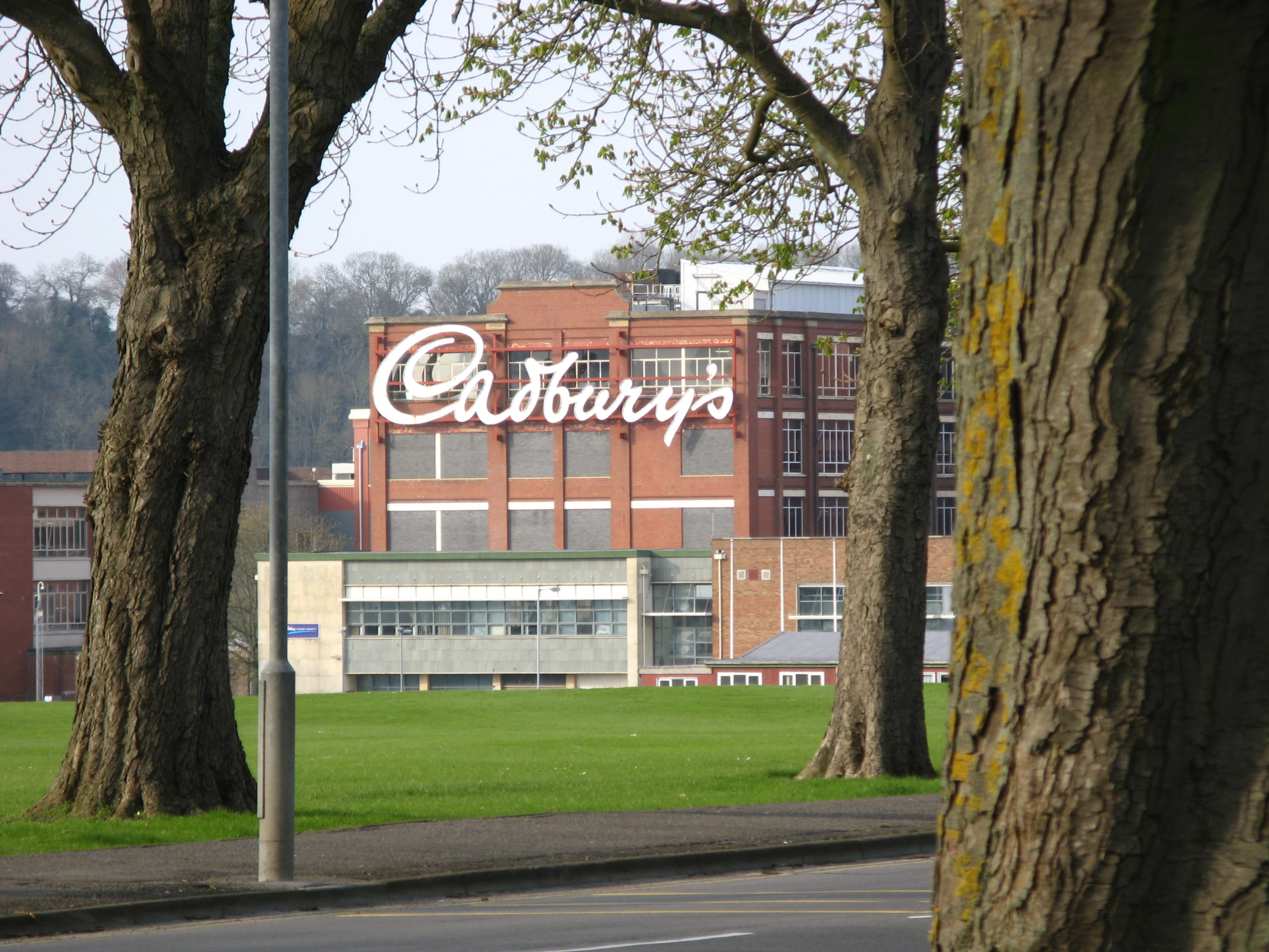
Cadbury's Somerdale Factory

=== Somerdale Chocolate Factory ===
In 1922, Keynsham was selected as the new location for Fry's chocolate factory. While digging the foundations for the factory, a second, smaller square Roman Villa was found, along with two stone coffins containing male and female skeletons. It was this discovery that captured popular interest, and led to the excavation of the cemetery site from 1922 to 1924. Unfortunately, the factory builders did not desire to resit the factory foundations. Instead, the Roman villa was dug up and reassembled near the entrance to the factory site. The factory construction went on as planned, and the remainder of the second Roman villa is now buried under the foundations of the factory. However, the factory did construct a factory museum located in a lodge near the entrance of the factory grounds, which used to house Roman artifacts and the mosaics excavated from the cemetery site.

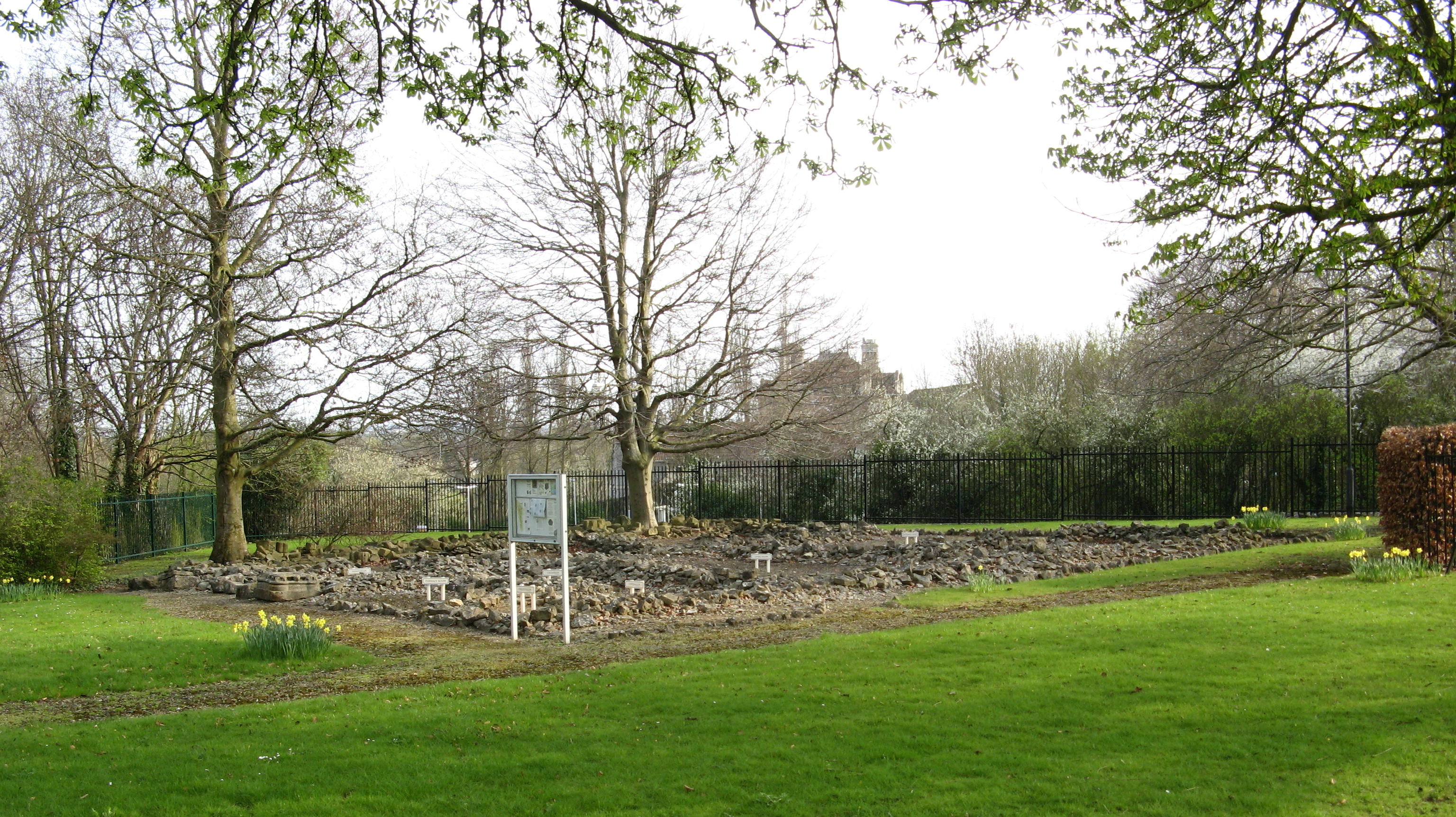
The relocated foundations of the Somerdale Villa

=== Taylor Wimpey Factory Redevelopment ===
In 2011, the Somerdale factory was permanently closed, and its operations and machinery relocated to Poland. In 2012, the sale of the property to Taylor Wimpey was finalized, and the site is currently in the process of being redeveloped as a residential community. A detailed geophysical assessment of the area was carried out ahead of redevelopment, and the remains of at least 15 additional Roman buildings were discovered, with evidence of others that have been disturbed by quarrying. However, despite the fact that the site has archeological potential, there are currently no plans to excavate the site.

== Architecture ==
=== The Grand Villa ===
The villa located under the Durley Hill Cemetery and the A4 may be one of grandest villas ever built in Britain, and has even been compared to a small palace. Archeologists believe that this villa may have been the home a high ranking retired-army officer or civil servant, and it had over 30 rooms, hypocaust heated floors, and numerous elaborate and expensive mosaics. The rooms were connected by a veranda supported by a colonnade which ran around three sides of the courtyard. An altar base dating to 155AD was discovered at the site and is inscribed:

NVM DIVOR AVG G INDVTIVS FELIX SILVANO VSLM CON VIC GA

(translation: For the divine spirit of the emperor, Gaius Indutius Felix willingly and deservedly fulfils his vow to Silvanus, in celebration of the victories against the Carvetii.)

It is thought that this inscription refers to the campaigns of governor Gnaeus Julius Verus who dealt with insurrection among the Carvetii tribe of Cumbria c.AD155. It is thought that this altar indicates emperor worship and devotion to the God Silvanus.

=== The Somerdale Villa ===
The Somerdale Villa is a square shaped villa built on a much smaller scale than the grand villa. About 50 feet square, it had 8 rooms and included a bathing suite.

=== Additional Buildings in Keynsham Hams ===
During the 2012 archeological survey by Taylor Wimpey, an additional 15 Roman buildings were detected under the fields of Keynsham Hams, with a central road running through the middle. This has led archeologists to suggest that Keynsham may be the location of lost Roman settlement of Trajectus, which is the Roman word for "bridgehead." Trajectus is thought to have been a crossing point of the River Avon, and the discovery of further Roman buildings in addition to the two Roman villas has strengthened the theory.
