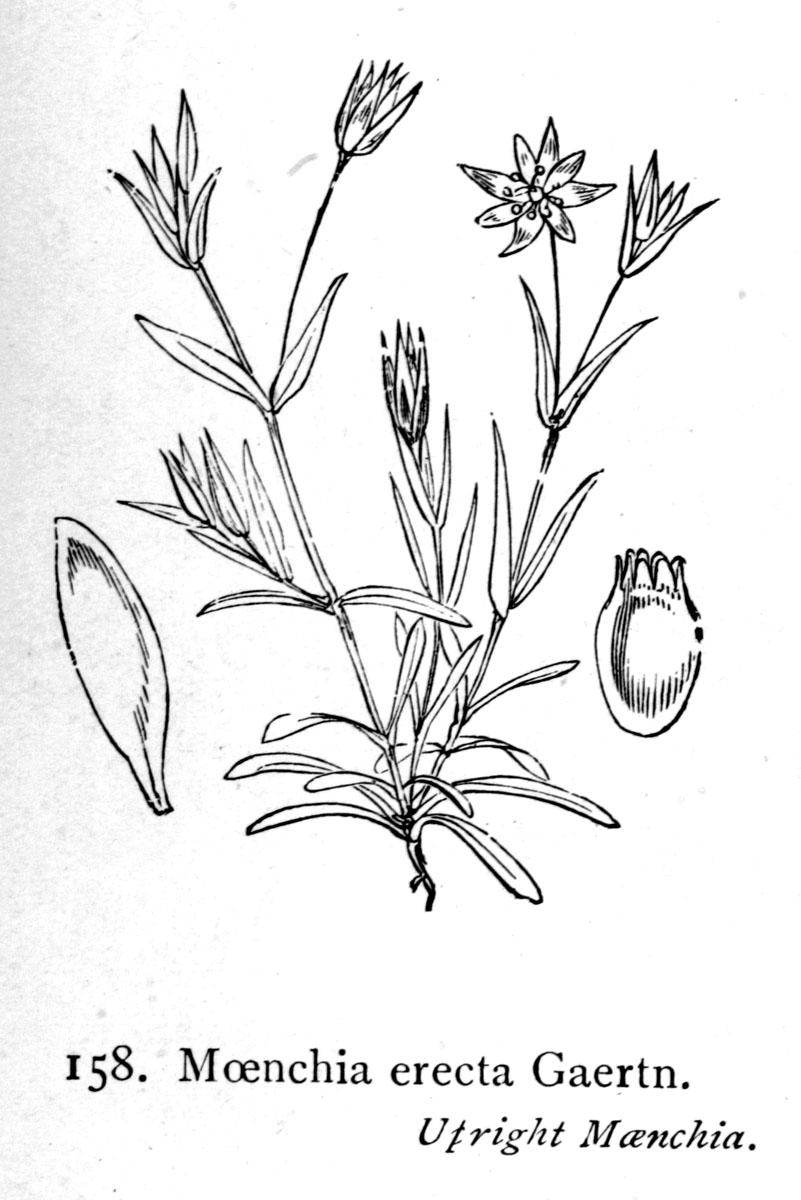
- Moenchia erecta

Scientific classification
- Kingdom: Plantae
- Clade: Embryophytes
- Clade: Tracheophytes
- Clade: Spermatophytes
- Clade: Angiosperms
- Clade: Eudicots
- Order: Caryophyllales
- Family: Caryophyllaceae
- Genus: Moenchia; Ehrh.

Species
- Moenchia erecta (L.) P. Gaertner; Moenchia graeca (Boiss) Heldr. Moenchia mantica (L.) Bartl.

= Moenchia =

Genus of flowering plants

Moenchia is a genus of plants in the family Caryophyllaceae with three species native to the Mediterranean region of southern Europe and naturalised in southern Africa and parts of North America and Australia. They are herbs, with an annual life span. They have slender roots and thin stems that are upright or ascending. Inflorescences are one- to three-flowered and terminally end the stems. The flowers are in spreading cymes or solitary, with bracts paired that are leaf like. Named after the 18th century German botanist Conrad Moench. A common name for the plants in this genus is upright chickweeds.

The species was first published by Jakob Friedrich Ehrhart in 'Neues Mag. Aerzte' Vol.5 Issue 3, on page 203 on 11 June 1783.

== Species ==
Known species are,

- Moenchia erecta (L.) P.Gaertn., B.Mey. & Scherb.
- Moenchia graeca Boiss. & Heldr.
- Moenchia mantica (L.) Bartl.
  - Moenchia mantica subsp. caerulea (Boiss.) Clapham
