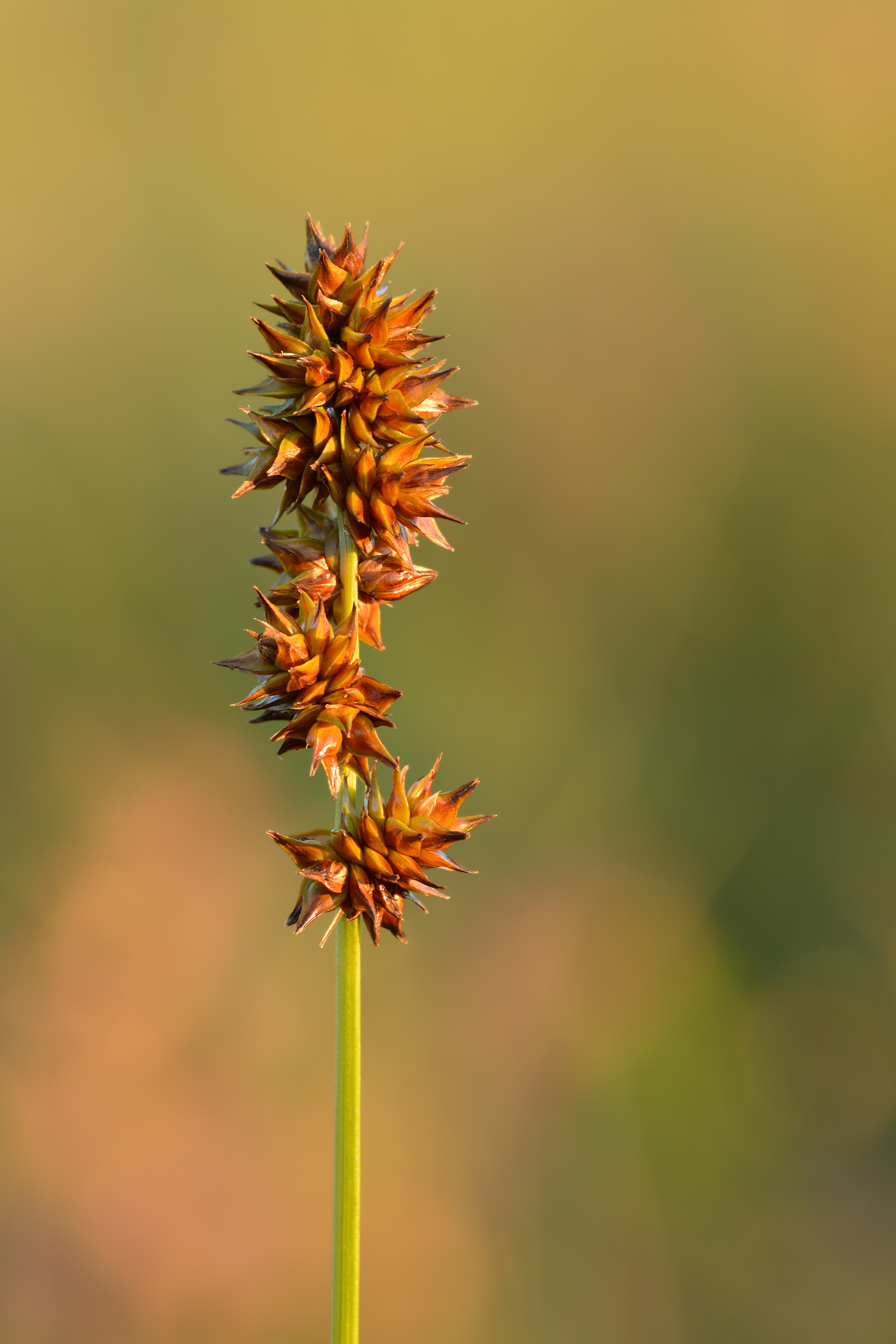

Scientific classification
- Kingdom: Plantae
- Clade: Tracheophytes
- Clade: Angiosperms
- Clade: Monocots
- Clade: Commelinids
- Order: Poales
- Family: Cyperaceae
- Genus: Carex
- Species: C. muricata

Binomial name
- Carex muricata L.

Synonyms
- List: Carex astracanica Willd. ex Kunth; Carex divulsa Gaudin [Illegitimate]; Carex divulsa subsp. orsiniana (Ten.) K.Richt.; Carex intermedia Retz.; Carex muricata var. alpina Gaudin; Carex muricata subsp. lamprocarpa (Wallr.) Celak.; Carex muricata var. lamprocarpa Wallr.; Carex muricata subsp. muricata; Carex muricata var. muricata; Carex muricata subsp. orsiniana (Ten.) Nyman; Carex orsiniana Ten.; Carex pairae subsp. borealis Hyl.; Carex pairae var. javanica Nelmes; Carex serotina Ten. [Illegitimate]; Carex stellulata M.Bieb. [Illegitimate]; Carex tenuissima Schur [Illegitimate]; Carex tergestina Hoppe ex Boott; Carex viridis Spenn. [Illegitimate]; Carex vulpina Hohen. [Illegitimate]; Caricina muricata (L.) St.-Lag.; Vignea altissima Schur; Vignea muricata (L.) Rchb.; Vignea muricata subsp. lamprocarpa (Wallr.) Soják; Vignea tenuissima Schur

= Carex muricata =

Species of grass-like plant

Carex muricata, the rough sedge or prickly sedge (a name it shares with other species), is a species of Carex found in Europe and western Asia as far as the Himalayas. It has been introduced elsewhere. Poorly studied, Carex muricata is considered a species aggregate. The aggregate has been subject to a great deal of taxonomic confusion over the years and has yet to be fully resolved.

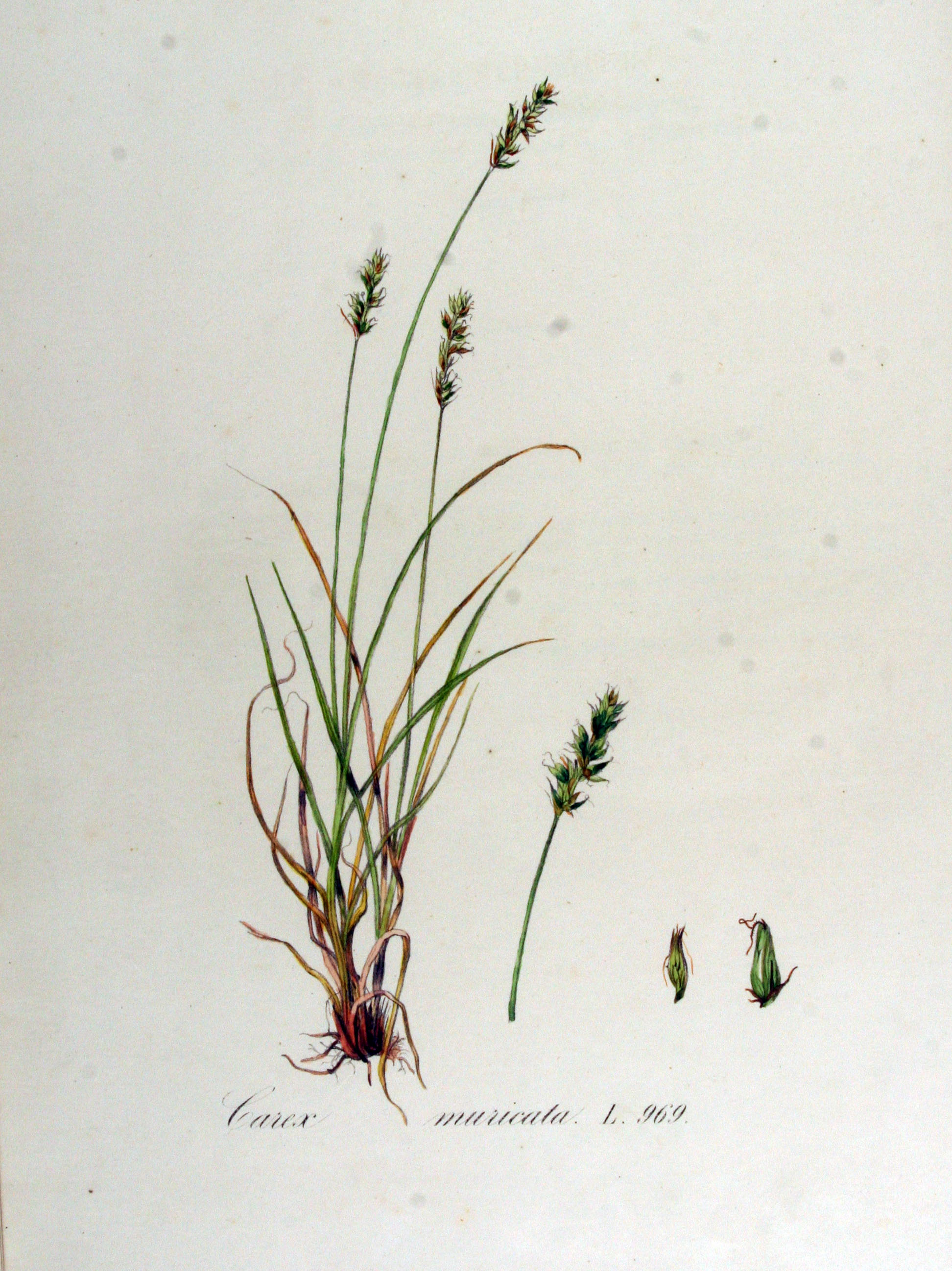
Botanical illustration
