= List of works by Arnold Wathen Robinson =

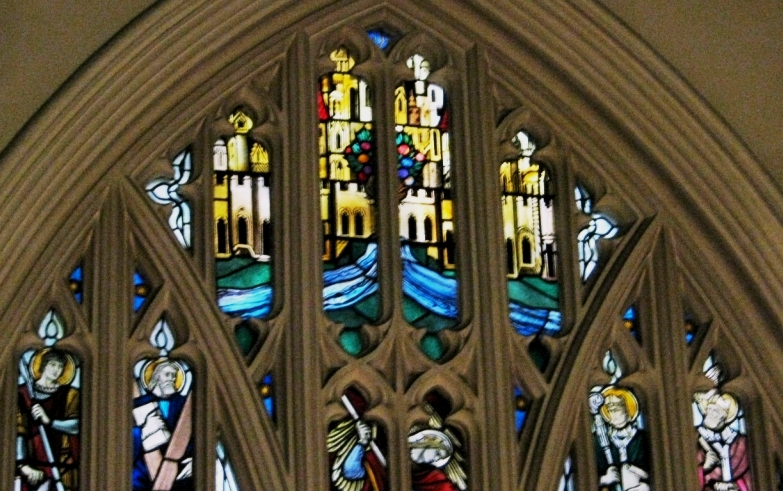
Top All Saints' Bristol East Window

List of works by Arnold Wathen Robinson includes information about some of the works of British stained glass artist Arnold Wathen Robinson. His works were, with just a few exceptions, conducted for churches.

== List of works ==
Church	Location	Date(s)	Subject, notes and references	Image
St Bartholomew Church	Burwash, Sussex	1955	There is a two-light window in the South Aisle area made by Joseph Bell and Son of Bristol and designed by Robinson. It consists of figures set in plain glass, giving a view of the Wealden landscape outside.	
Church of St Stephen and St Tathan	Caerwent, Monmouthshire	1948	Robinson executed a window for this church through Joseph Bell & Son depicting St Michael with St Nicholas and St George. It is in the West wall of the Tower.	
All Hallows Church	Easton	1948	Robinson completed the East window of six lights that depicts St Augustine of Canterbury, St Anselm of Canterbury, St Edward the Confessor, St Edmund the Martyr, St Hugh of Lincoln and St David of Wales.	
All Saints’ Church	Bristol	1949	Robinson was responsible for the East window. The church is now a Diocesan Education Centre. Image shown here courtesy Samuel Ford, Resourcing Administrator, Department for Children & Young People. Diocese of Bristol.	
All Saints Church	Publow, Bath & North East Somerset	1939	Robinson was responsible for the three-light traceried window in the North Aisle East of this church in 1939.	
Bristol Baptist College/Bristol University, Department of Archaeology and Anthropology.	Bristol		A large Arts and Crafts stained glass staircase window for Bristol Baptist College was specially commissioned from Robinson in 1916. This window shows scenes from the life of William Tyndale, who produced the first printed English translation of the New Testament in 1525. The window was presented to the college by one of Robinson's aunts in memory of her father, the Reverend Frederick W Gotch LLD, who was principal of the college from 1868 to 1883. The Tyndale Window comprises four lights and in the top section and from left to right are a vine, a city set on a hill and an open copy of the New Testament and interwoven between the city and the Book is the following inscription, based on a quotation by Tyndale: "As a city set on a hill cannot be hid so the light of Christ's gospel may not be hid as though it pertained to certain holy persons only." In the fourth light is a spray of palm fronds representing a crown. In the four middle sections Tyndale is depicted in the first explaining his intention to translate the New Testament, in the next preaching on College Green in Bristol, next to the cathedral, in the next scene he is shown about to board a boat for Germany and clutching the manuscripts of his translations, and then printing his translation in Worms, Germany. In the four bottom sections we see copies of Tyndale's translation being burnt at (Old) St Paul's while the Bishop of London rails against them, Tyndale's arrest, Tyndale continuing to work on in his prison cell and finally Tyndale's body being publicly burnt at the stake. In 2002, the college found it necessary to sell their building to the university and the building now houses the university's Archaeology and Anthropology departments. Robinson's Tyndale window is still in place there, and the university has committed itself to preserving it	
Bristol Cathedral	Bristol		In the Berkeley Chapel of the Cathedral in Bristol are a series of works in glass depicting the "Childhood of Christ". According to Pevsner these date to 1925 and were a joint design by the painter Ernest Board and Robinson. Robinson also executed four windows on the North Nave Aisle commemorating the efforts of the local wartime civilian services. Each of these four windows has two pairs of figures in the central lights. The first window, that nearer to the entrance to the cathedral, is dedicated to the St John Ambulance Service and "Nursing Services". The window depicts a St John Ambulance Stretcher Bearer and a nurse, and the "Nursing Services" are represented by a Matron at her medicine cabinet and a nurse with a sick child in his dressing gown and holding a toy train. In the transom are the dates of six of the German bombing raids on Bristol. The next window is dedicated to the British Red Cross Society and the "Fire Service" and Robinson includes a Red Cross stretcher bearer and a nurse with trolley, whilst for the "Fire Service" we see a fireman with hose and a fire woman, and, in the background, a city in flames this including St Mary Redcliffe. In the transom are roundels of stretcher bearers and of rescuers up a ladder. The next window includes the "Wardens Service" which depicts a male air raid warden with axe, stirrup pump and bell and a female warden with rattle and the "Bristol Police" window which has a police-man and a police-woman. The background is a street map of the College Green and adjoining areas. Also depicted are the Civil Defence (CD) and Air Raid Precautions (ARP) badges and Police badges. The fourth window depicts two Home Guardsmen one with a shell and the other with a sten gun and the "Womens Voluntary Service" in which Robinson features a Women's Voluntary Service (WVS) telephonist and a nurse depicted with a small girl clutching her teddy bear. In this window there are badges of the Home Guard and Women's Voluntary Service, and roundels featuring an Anti-Aircraft Gun and a scene from the Blitz. All four windows are in memory of the services given in the 1939-1945 war. Bristol suffered from heavy German bombing. In the church precinct cloister are various fragments of medieval glass arranged by Robinson. Several images of the Bristol Cathedral windows are shown below. The book "The Stained Glass of Bristol Cathedral" by M.Q. Smith, published by The Redcliffe Press in 1983, ISBN 0 905459 71 7 gives much information on Robinsons' work in the cathedral.	The Ambulance Service
Chalmers Presbyterian Church	Timaru, New Zealand		Robinson designed a three-light window for this church depicting "Christ and the children".	
Chipchase Castle Chapel	Chipchase, Northumberland		Robinson designed a single-light window in memory of Captain Hugh Taylor. The window depicts the Angel of the Lord appearing to Mary Magdalene outside the sepulchre after the resurrection. The central diamond of the window contains the badge of the Scots Guards. The window is inscribed "In Memoriam / Captain Hugh Taylor / Scots Guards / Born Christmas Eve 1880 / Killed in action Dec. 18th 1914".	
Christ Church	Nailsea	1925	Robinson was responsible for several stained glass windows in this church and they have been collectively dedicated to those who died in the Great War. Across the base of the windows is the inscription "These windows are humbly offered 1925 / Tell ye children of it and let your children tell their children, and their children another generation".	
Royal Air Force Museum	Hendon, Greater London		In the Bomber Hall of the museum is a two-light window removed from David Thomas United Reformed Church in Belmont Road, Bishopston, Bristol in 1983. The church had been declared redundant in 1981 and was demolished in 1987. The window called the "Bools Memorial Window" commemorated the deaths of four brothers on operations and test flights during the Second World War. The window was presented to the RAF Museum by Mrs Elizabeth Woods, the sister of the brothers. The left hand light has the Royal Air Force (RAF) badge at the head and depicts an airman in flying clothes with an aircraft behind him and the right light depicts a winged saint in red and gold robes, carrying a lance and wearing a winged helmet. Inscriptions are in upright capital lettering in panels at the foot of each light. (Note: The museum accession numbers are X002-07583 (left panel) and X002-7854 (right panel))	
Royal Infirmary Hospital Chapel	Bristol	1911	A three-light East window of 1911 has St Elisabeth of Hungary in the centre light, the other two lights being of plain glazing.	
St Alban the Martyr Church	Bristol	1920–1925	There are several Robinson windows in this church in the area of Westbury Park, Bristol. These date from 1920 to 1925. One small window at the East end of the church depicts Christ in the Garden of Gethsemane and includes the colours purple and red both liturgically associated with the Passion. The East "Te Deum" window is a war memorial window and involves five-lights with additional tracery lights above. There are two tiers of imagery representing heaven in the upper tier and earth in the tiers below. In the lower tier Robinson includes sailors, soldiers, airmen and nurses as well as a Royal Flying Corps aviator. In the upper lights Robinson depicts Christ, his right hand raised in blessing and in his left hand he holds the key to the Kingdom of Heaven. He is surrounded by angels, including St Michael. The inscription reads "In memory of the men and women of this church and parish/who gave their lives in the Great War 1914-1918." In the notes written by Geoffrey Robinson for "The Friends of Bristol Cathedral", he describes the "Te Deum" window as "Arnold’s greatest and most glorious window so far."	
St Ambrose Church	Bristol		For this church in the east of Bristol, Robinson designed a window in the North Aisle West in 1922. Foyle and Pevsner seem unsure as to who executed the window and say "in style of Arnold Robinson"	
St Andrew Church	Loxton		Robinson's two-light war memorial window in the North Chapel depicts St George in the right hand light slaying the dragon and the St Michael in the light on the right with the scales of justice. A second two-light window depicts Andrew and his brother Simon with the words "FIRST FINDETH HIS OWN BROTHER FOR" with a reference to St John Chapter 1, Verse 41.	
St Anne's Church	Oldland	1931	Robinson executed a circular West window for this church in Oldland near Bristol. The window depicts angels appearing to the Shepherds outside Bethlehem, and is one of the few examples of Arts and Crafts stained glass being made for a circular window.	
St Edyth Church	Bristol	1929 to 1930	This Church in the Sea Mills with Coombe Dingle area of Bristol has two windows by Robinson.	
St Luke's Church	Brislington	1948	Foyle and Pevsner have some doubt, but a window in the church thought to be by Arnold Robinson. The window in question is the main Altar window and replaces an 1874 window destroyed during wartime air raids. The replacement window, designed by Robinson and installed in 1948, depicts the Crucifixion. The Temple (Gore-Langton) Coat of Arms is depicted in the bottom centre panel, this a detail taken from the original window, the Coat of Arms of the Diocese of Bristol and the province of Canterbury. Photograph courtesy Graham Burchell, a Sacristan of St Luke's.	
St Martin Church	Knowle	1930, 1947-8	Robinson executed some small lights in the South Aisle in 1930. In 1947–1948, he worked on the East window and the East window in the Lady Chapel. His son Geoffrey carried out some traceries and a rose West window.	
St Mary Church	Aldershot, Hampshire		The Robinson window in this church was a joint cooperation with Lilian Josephine Pocock.	
St Mary Church	Bristol	1914-15 (ca)	Robinson executed a four-light window for the West wall of the North Aisle of the church.	
St Mary's Church	Christon		The 1950 window in the North Nave is by Robinson and depicts an airman and a nurse with search lights lighting up the night sky in the background. There is a map of the Kiel Canal area at their feet. Known as the "Bomber Command Window", it commemorates Sergeant Kenneth Michael Garton Durrant, a navigator with 582 Squadron based at Little Staughton who at the age of 21 was lost on a raid against Kiel on the night 15/16 September 1944. He is buried in Kiel War Cemetery. It seems there is an error in the painting as Sgt Durrant is shown with an albatross shoulder flash on his battle-dress. This particular flash was not worn during the war, although it was re-instated after the war. At the base of the window is the inscription "In ever loving memory of Catherine Hermione Garton and Michael beloved wife and son of Kenneth Garton Durrant and daughter and grandson of Charles Rawlinson Wainwright". There is also a South window in the church by Robinson with the inscription "To the Glory of God and in loving memory of Catherine Letitia Wainwright who died 11th July 1926. This window was given by her husband." In this window Robinson depicts the Virgin Mary reading to the Infant Christ.	
St Mary's Church	Shirehampton	1930	A three-light window of 1930 remembers those of the parish who laid down their lives in the First and Second World Wars. The central panel of the window depicts the crucified Christ, with Roman soldiers at the foot of the Cross. The left and right hand lights have a names of all those lost, these running from the top down. There are 58 names listed for the First World War and 41 for the Second World War. In the North Aisle Chapel area are remnants of a complete scheme planned by Robinson in 1930 but not completed and there is also some Robinson work in the organ chamber. The War Memorial Window was unveiled by the Archdeacon of Bristol on 9 February 1930.	
St Mary and St Peter's Church	Winford	1945-7	Various windows in the aisles depict Armorials.	
St Matthew's Church	Bristol		For this church in area of Kingsdown, Bristol, Robinson designed and installed four three-light windows after the church's 1927 restoration. Photograph shown here courtesy Simon Pugh-Jones. Architect.	
St Michael and All Angels Church	Bedminster, Bristol		In left hand light of Robinson's window for this church, Jesus is shown blessing a child and below is the inscription "He went throughout every city and village preaching and showing the glad tidings of the Kingdom of God". The central panel shows the Blessed Virgin Mary with Jesus on her lap.	
St Michael the Archangel Church	Bristol		For this church in the Two Mile Hill area of Bristol, Robinson was responsible for the stained glass East window in 1950.	
St Paul's Church	Bristol	1949	Robinson executed a window for the North Tower area in 1949. This is now a redundant church run by the Churches Conservation Trust.	
St Stephen's Church	Bristol		Robinson completed the six-light main West window, described as "clearly drawn figures set in clear glass", for this church in 1951.	
St Stephen's Church	Lympne, Kent	1918	Robinson designed a single light window depicting St Elizabeth of Hungary. The window was installed in memory of Henry Brydges who died in 1915.	
Tyntesfield House	Wraxall, Somerset		Tyntesfield House, a Victorian Gothic Revival house with gardens and parkland, is now managed by the National Trust. It has its own chapel and crypt attached to the house and the chapel has a stained glass window by Robinson.	
Tyndale Baptist Church	Clifton, Bristol		Tyndale Baptist Church was badly damaged by fire in the Blitz and a new church had to be built as only the walls were left, standing as an empty shell. The church reopened in 1955 and shortly after this Robinson executed the Tyndale and Bunyan windows. These face each other at each end of the transept. In the centre of the Bunyan window is the standing figure of John Bunyan, carrying a volume of "Pilgrims Progress". Underneath are the words "John Bunyan 1628-1688". He is surrounded by eight smaller lights. At the bottom left, we see Christian leaving the City of Destruction at the beginning of his pilgrimage. As he walks, he is immersed in reading a book. Around the upper half of the panel are the words: "Graceless goes the way of destruction". In the background can be seen a distant city, with the word "Destruction" on a building. In a scroll over and around Christian are the words "What shall I do to be saved?" To the right of the above, we see Christian being pulled out of the Slough of Despond. Ahead is a winding road leading to a wall with a portal whose gates are closed. Underneath are the words: "The name of the slough was Despond". In the next panel, Christian kneels before the symbol of the cross and as he does so the burden on his back falls away. Over his head are words "He hath given me life by his death". Next we are told, "He espied two lions in the way", and we see the lions lying threateningly in wait. The inscription reads "Difficulty is behind. Fear is before". Christian, his sword in his hand, next encounters the fearsome Apollyon. Underneath are the words "Apollyon straddled the whole way". The final three lights are interrelated. Across the base of all three run the words "Blessed are they that do his commandments that they may enter in through the gates of the city". The first and third lights each feature three seraphs with trumpets. Those on the left have scrolls proclaiming "Holy Holy Holy", and on the far right "is the Lord". A long beam of light leads up into the apex of the window, symbolising presumably the Celestial City and between the above two another light depicts two angelic figures, lifting two pilgrims from a river, each of whom carries in his hand a rolled scroll. The church's Tyndale window is of three lights and has eight scenes relating to Tyndale's life grouped around a central figure of Tyndale himself. Each scene has an explanatory caption. In the first light on the left hand side of the window there is a fortress or castle, on a hill at the top of the light and underneath are the words- "I will cause a boy that driveth the plough shall know more of the Scriptures than thou". Beneath this we have a picture of Tyndale and a priest with the caption "Tyndale at Little Sodbury". In the next and middle light of the window there is at the top a jewel-shaped decoration and under this is a scene featuring Bristol Cathedral. We see a mixed crowd from which a shepherd's crook is shown protruding. In the front of the crowd a boy and girl can be seen on the green. They are all listening to Tyndale preaching. The caption below reads "On College Green”. At their rear we see the Cathedral itself. In the next light on the right and at the top a printer is shown at work under the symbol of an open book and he is being watched in his work by Tyndale who has a Bible in his hands. Behind these are the words Peter Quentel, and on a table in front a pile of papers waits for printing. The caption reads “Printing the New Testament.” In the next scene, the second down on the left, we see Tyndale about to board a boat moored at the quayside with sheets of paper in hand. A sailor in the boat is pulling the rigging. Beneath are the words "Saving half-printed sheets". In the middle panel of the centre light and over the words "WILLIAM TYNDALE 1490-1536" we see Tyndale himself. He stands erect and clutching the Scriptures. In the next light to the right and in the middle of the right hand light we see Bishop Tunstall at St Paul's. He stands in a pulpit preaching and before him on the ground is a pile of New Testaments burning. A naked flame rises skywards. and a mixed crowd watch and listen. The caption reads "Bishop Tunstall at St Paul's". Next in the bottom row of the left hand light and with the caption "Phillips betrays him", a man reaches out toward Tyndale. Two men are brandishing weapons, one an axe and the other a lance or spear. They are arresting him. In the lower scene of the middle light and in a darkened cell with the night sky visible through the barred window and with a single light for illumination, we see Tyndale sitting at a table, a book propped up in front of him, writing in another book. The caption reads "Tyndale works in prison". Finally, in the lower part of the right hand light, we see a fiercely burning fire being stoked by executioners with a rake and one flame rises skyward. In the centre of this the lifeless body of William Tyndale can be seen. Underneath are the words "Tyndale’s body is burned". Across the lower panes are the words "As a city set on a hill cannot be hid even so the light of Christ’s gospel may not be hid as though it pertained to some certain holy persons only". Apart from the Tyndale and Bunyan windows, Robinson completed three double windows for the church. These are in the chancel behind the communion table and the baptistery and on each of them Robinson depicts biblical images in order to focus attention on the Life, Ministry, Death and Resurrection of Our Lord, with opening images depicting the creation and the giving of the Law. In the first double window, one light shows Adam and Eve with Cain and Abel. They stand in front of a tree in whose branches we see a coiled snake. Adam is busy digging and Eve holds in her hands what appears to be some sort of utensil. Some plants grow at their feet. In the right hand light of this first window Moses holds a scroll of the Law. A halo surrounds his head from which rays of light are emitted. In the next double window the light on the left shows Mary, the mother of Jesus. She kneels before the Baby Jesus who lies in a crib. Joseph stands behind her holding a lamp and behind him we see the head of a cow. Above them Robinson paints a cross-shaped structure and a little higher is an Angel who gazes down and over the word "Emmanuel." In the right hand light Jesus stands in a boat preaching to some disciples, two of whom kneel and gaze up at him in adoration. Another man appears to be running away. In the third and final window Robinson depicts the crucifixion in the right hand light with Roman soldiers playing dice at Our Lord's Feet and in the left hand light the Resurrection is depicted. We see a large figure of Christ, dressed in a white robe with a golden outer garment. He dwarfes the empty tomb which He has left and besides Him we see a tree starting to grow. Three Roman soldiers sleep at the bottom of the picture. The church also has a War Memorial window by Arnold Wathen Robinson dating to 1955 which features St John the Divine and David. It was St John the Divine who wrote the Book of Revelation, whose visionary passages contain several references to wars and fighting (e.g. the Battle of Armageddon). At one point, war breaks out in heaven between the Archangel Michael and the "great dragon", the devil. In Robinson's window, Michael is depicted as having slain the dragon, and over the head of the picture are the words "And there shall be no more death" (Rev. 12:7-8). In the other picture, we see the boy David, just after his encounter with Goliath, sling still in his hand, and his pouch, which had contained stones, slung over his shoulder. At his feet is the head of the giant upside down on the ground! The words of Psalm 37:15 are quoted " Their sword shall enter their own heart" and a smaller circular window beneath this depicts David slaying a lion. (1 Samuel 17:34-37). A picture of Noah's ark is shown in the apex of the window. Robinson intended the theme of this window as "Triumph through Adversity." In addition to the names of the three Robinson brothers who died in the fighting, two other men of the church are also recorded: Arnold St John Leger Kerry and Alfred Rutherford Whitewright. There is another window, adjacent to the war memorial window and painted in 1960, which is a memorial to Arnold Robinson himself. It was executed by Arnold Robinson's two children, Geoffrey and Daphne, and given to the church by them and Arnold's wife Constance. The window features St John the Baptist, chosen as the last of the prophets and St Stephen, chosen as the first of the martyrs. In a plain panel are the words "ARNOLD WATHEN ROBINSON MASTER GLASS PAINTER 1888-1955" Its theme is the ministry and mission of Jesus. This is signified by two figures representing the beginning and the ‘end’ of this. The figure of John the Baptist dominates this window. His right hand is raised in blessing and in his left, he holds a staff. His clothing of camel's hair, with the leather belt over his shoulder, complemented by the bushy beard, convey the fierceness of his character. But the lamb which lingers around his legs, reflects his words when Jesus came to meet him, "Behold the Lamb of God, who takes away the sins of the world" (John 1:29). Over John's head are the words "He shall baptize you with the Holy Ghost". At his feet are the words "St John Baptist". Beneath this, is a circular light, depicting a kneeling Jesus, immediately before John baptizes him. A light from heaven shines down on him. The figure of Stephen stands alongside John, the first follower of Jesus to give his life for his faith, thus expressing the fulfilment of what Jesus came to achieve. In a small circlet, Stephen is shown appearing before the high priest (Acts 7:1ff). In the larger picture, Stephen preaches a sermon, tracing the history of the Hebrew people repeatedly opposing God and rejecting the prophets whom God sent to them. On the ground are the stones or rocks which his hearers threw at him. In the background is the city of Jerusalem, its towers red with anger, the colour of blood. Above are Stephen's words "Behold I see the heavens opened, and the Son of Man standing at the right hand of God." In the apex of the window is a symbolic representation of this. The words beneath are a quotation from the (Apocrypha "Ecclesiasticus 41.13") "A good life hath a few days, but a good name endureth for ever". Geoffrey Robinson has a second window in the church which he executed in 1970. It is entitled "Sickness and Suffering". It features the suffering of Job and of the woman suffering from haemorrhages who touched the hem of Jesus's garment. At the base of the window are the words "Through pain and suffering give glory to him." It was given by an anonymous donor, who paid for it herself and chose the theme. It is a two-light window and on the left is Job, the Old Testament character who suffered a long series of misfortunes and tragedies. These culminated in a dreadful illness which brought out "sore boils" covering him "from the soles of his feet to his crown". These are graphically depicted on all the exposed parts of his body. Yet his faith remains serene. Above him are his words as he kneels in prayer "Blessed be the name of the Lord". (Job 1:21). In the other light is the woman suffering from haemorrhages who touched Jesus's robe. The view we see of him is his back, but as she touches him, startled, he turns and looks behind him, asking "Who touched me?"(Mark 5:30). His disciples are astonished at his question. Above the picture are the words "If I may but touch his garment, I shall be made whole". Beneath is his response "Thy faith hath made thee whole." Under this picture are two smaller ones depicting the work of the modern healing profession. They are now of course dated as the equipment, technology and dress reflect the times when the picture was executed., Nevertheless, the principle remains valid. In one circle, a blood transfusion is shown in progress, and in the other, an operation. In the apex of each light is a symbol of healing: on the left a pestle and mortar, and on the right a caduceus. The latter is an ancient symbol traditionally worn as a kind of charm, signifying healing. Tyndale Baptist Church does indeed contain some superb Robinson stained glass and images of the "Tyndale" and "Bunyan" windows are shown below and some further images appear in the "Gallery".[1] “There is a memorial window to him in Tyndale Baptist Church but really, all his windows are a memorial to this most talented of men" Words written by Arnold Robinson's son, Geoffrey.	
Wills Memorial Building	Bristol		Robinson had made the original "Founder’s window" in the university's main building's entrance hall, this to a design by D. Milner, but this was very badly damaged by a bomb during the Second World War. A replacement window was installed in 1953 again to D. Milner's design and made by Robinson but the design was changed from that originally used. The present design shows the armorials of Wills, the university, the city, Merchant Venturers, Wiltshire, Gloucester, Somerset, Balliol College, New College, Percival, Fry, Hobhouse, Haldane, Leverhulme, Worsley and Abbot – all those who had contributed to the founding of the university. The window includes two dates, 1876 when University College was founded and 1909 the date of the university's charter. Also included is the university's motto," Vim Promovet Insitam.".	

== Gallery ==
=== Bristol Cathedral ===
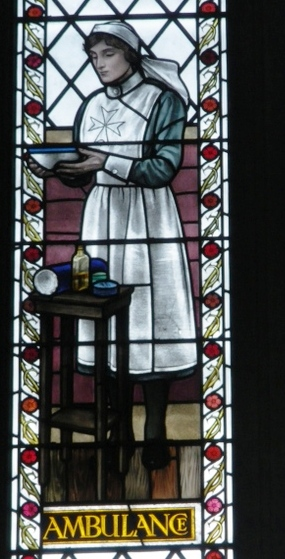
The Ambulance Service

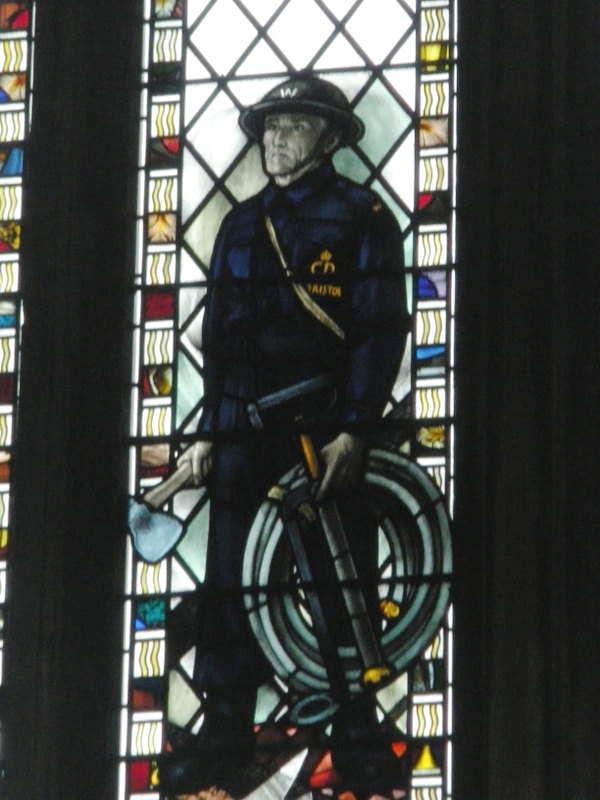
Warden in Bristol Cathedral window

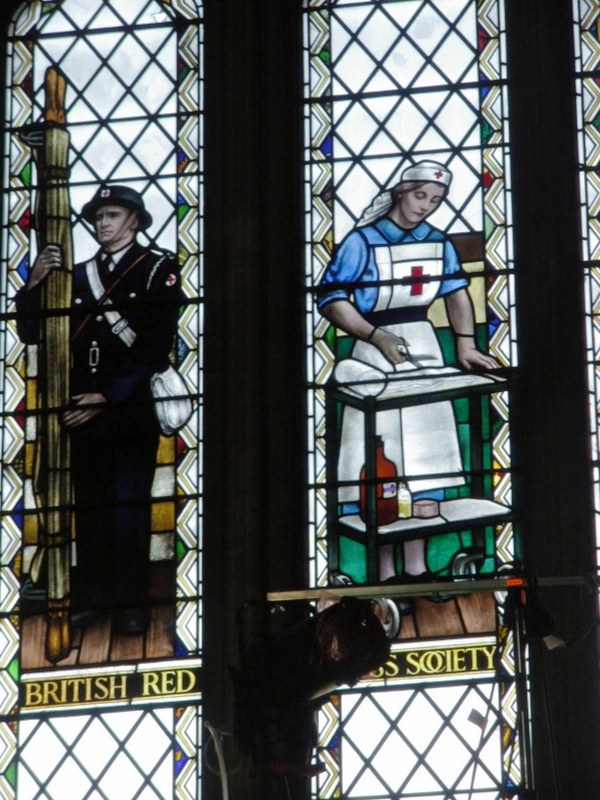
Red Cross window

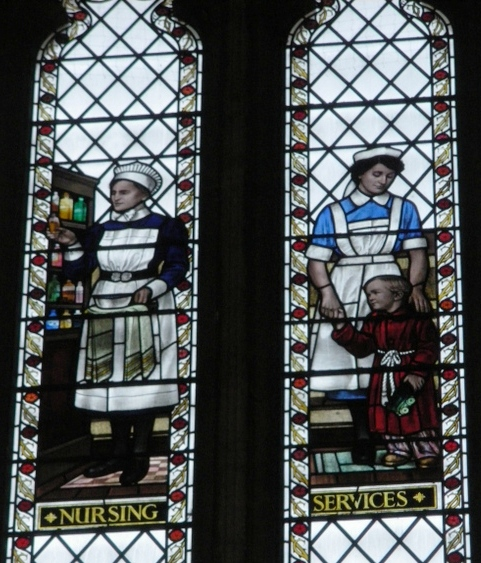
Window depicting Nursing Services

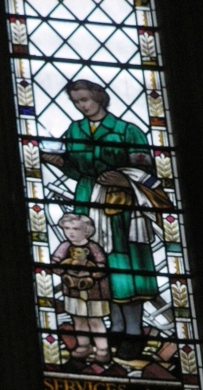
Small girl with teddy bear.

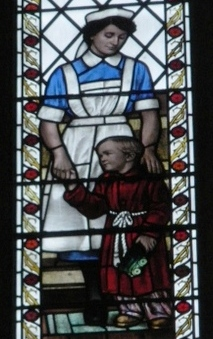
Small boy with train

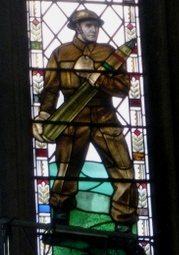
Home Guard

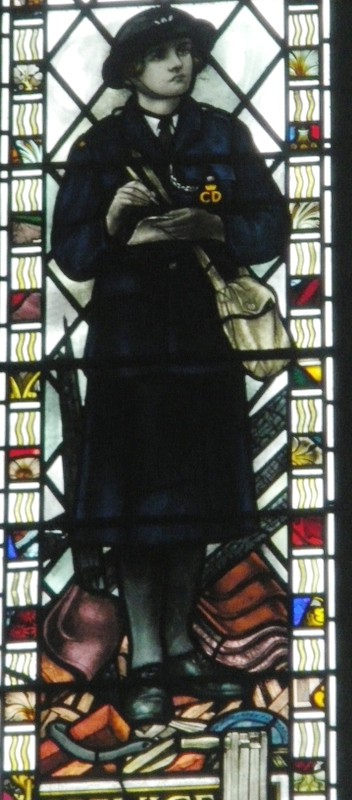
Civil Defence window

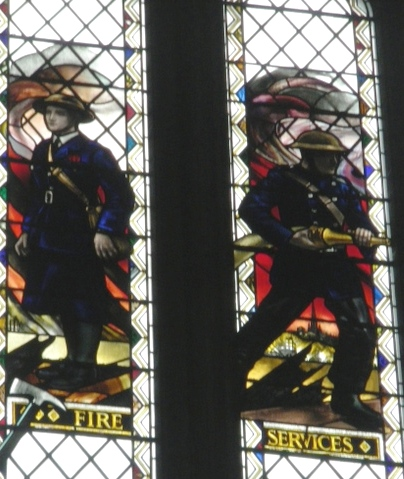
Fire Services window

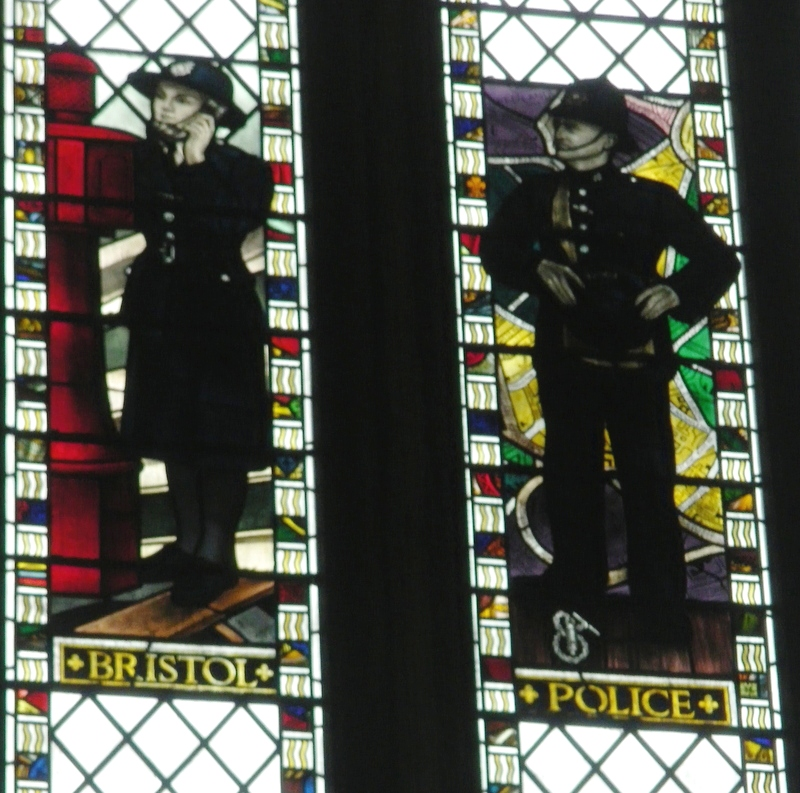
Bristol Police window

=== All Saint's, Bristol ===
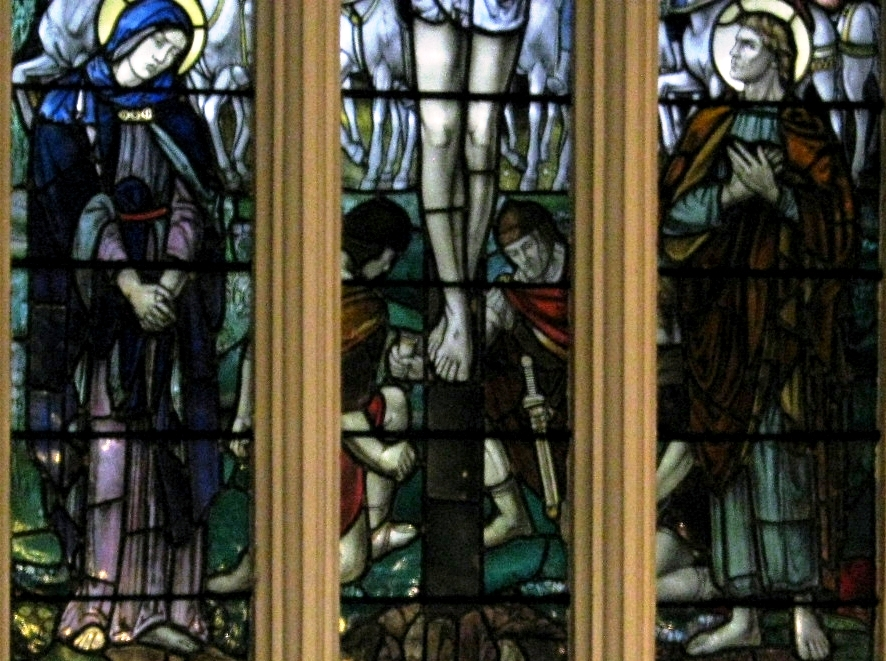
All Saints' Bristol

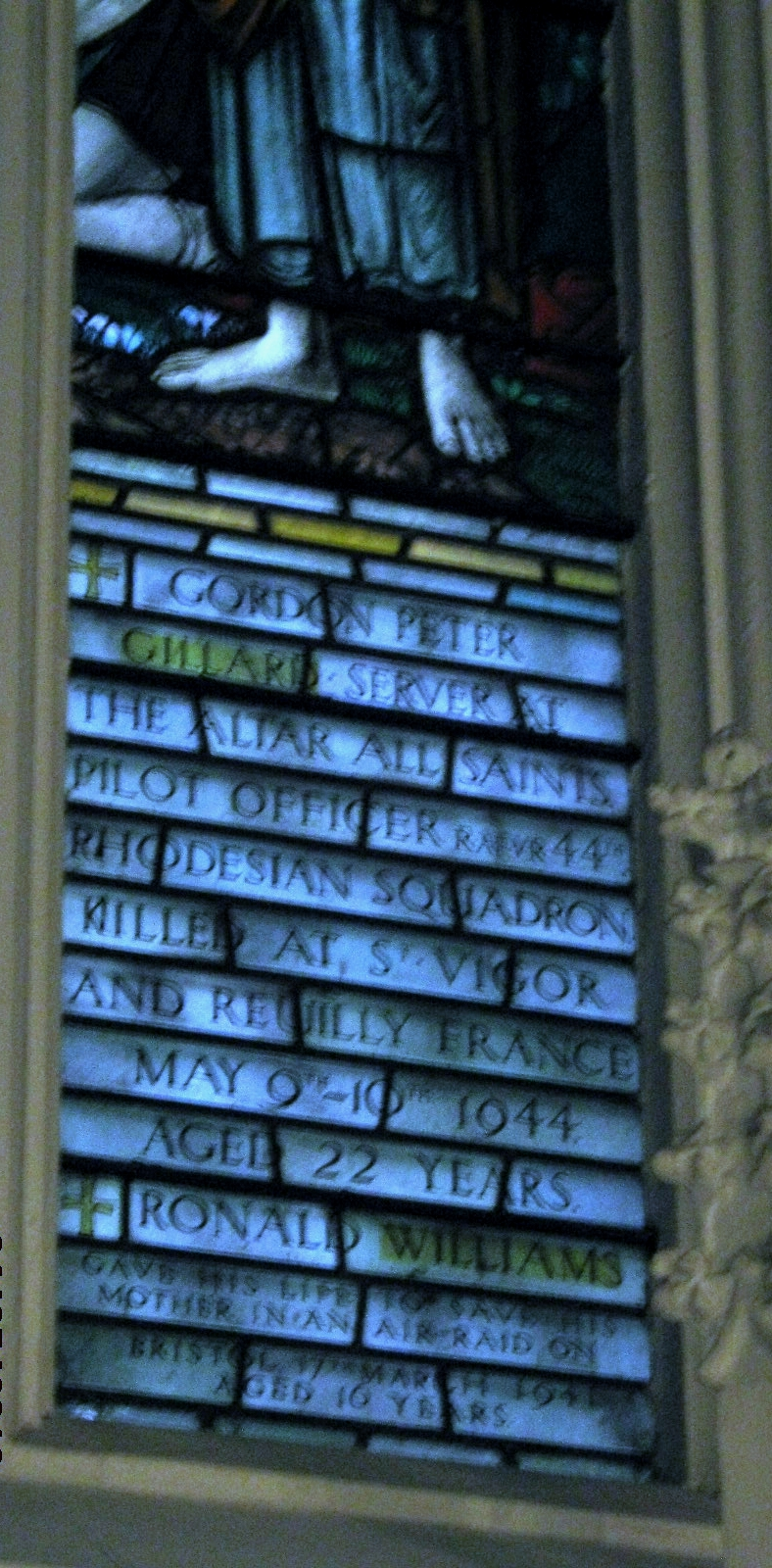
All Saints' Bristol

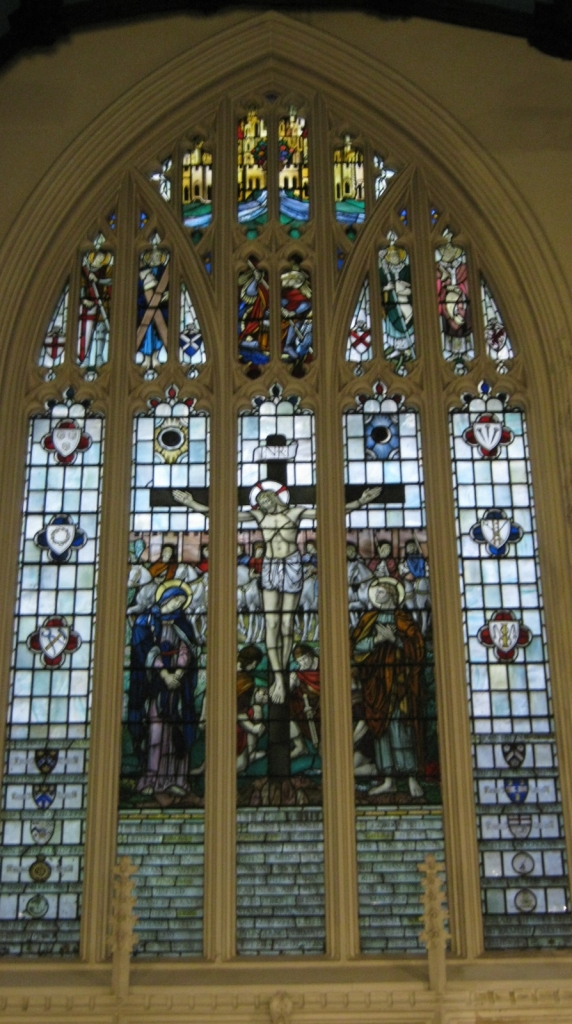
East window All Saints’ Church. Bristol

=== St. Michael the Archangel ===
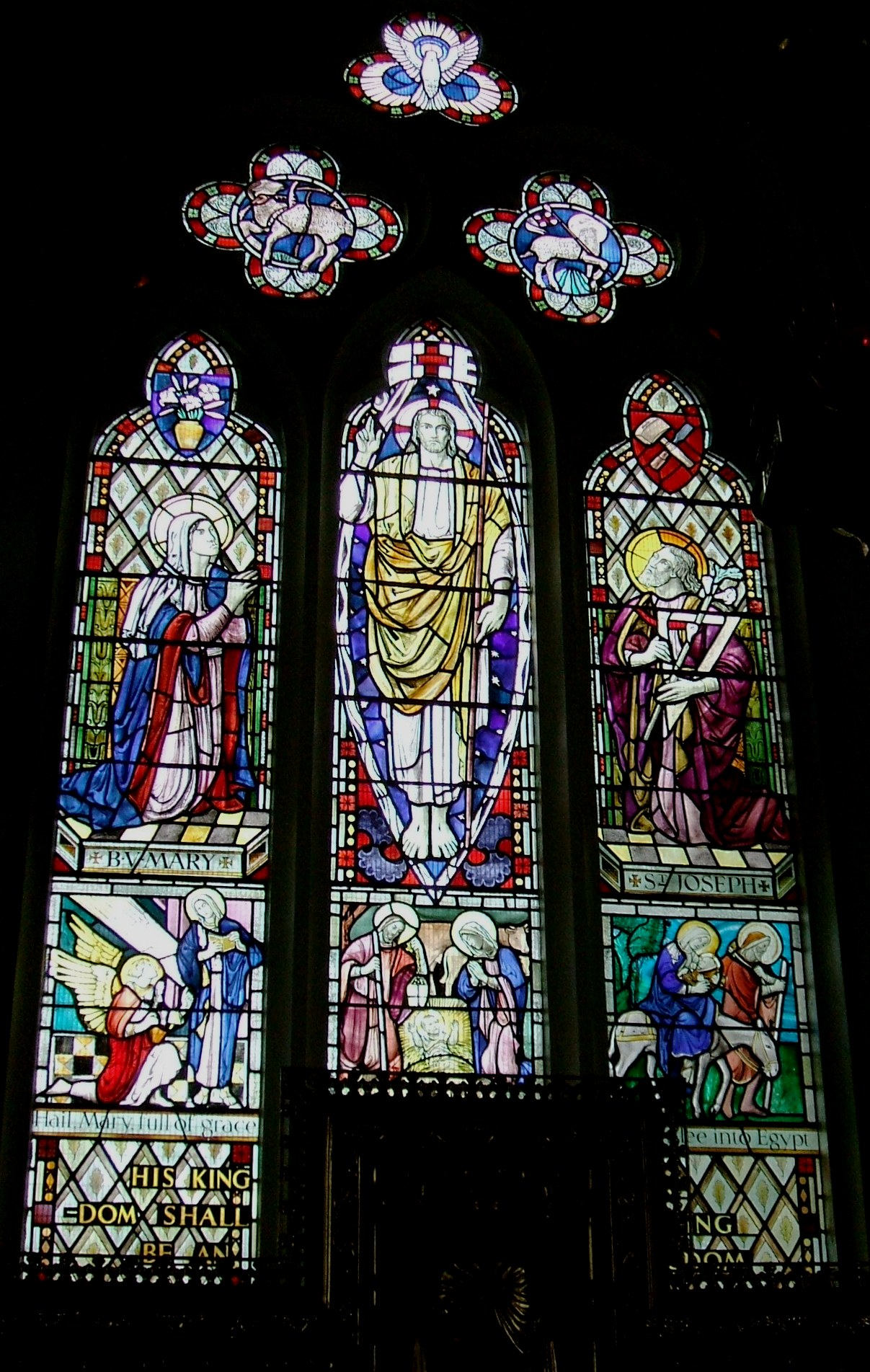
Window in St Michael the Archangel Bristol

=== St. Matthew's Church, Bristol ===
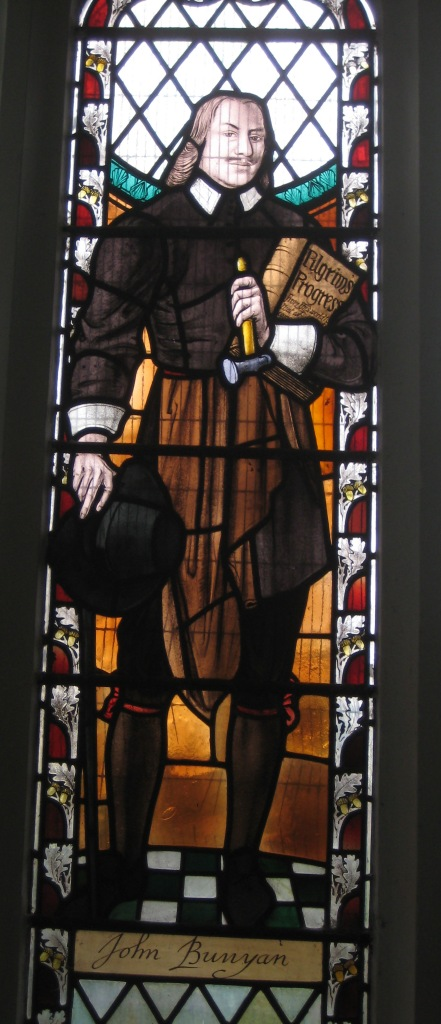
St Matthew's Church Bristol- John Bunyan

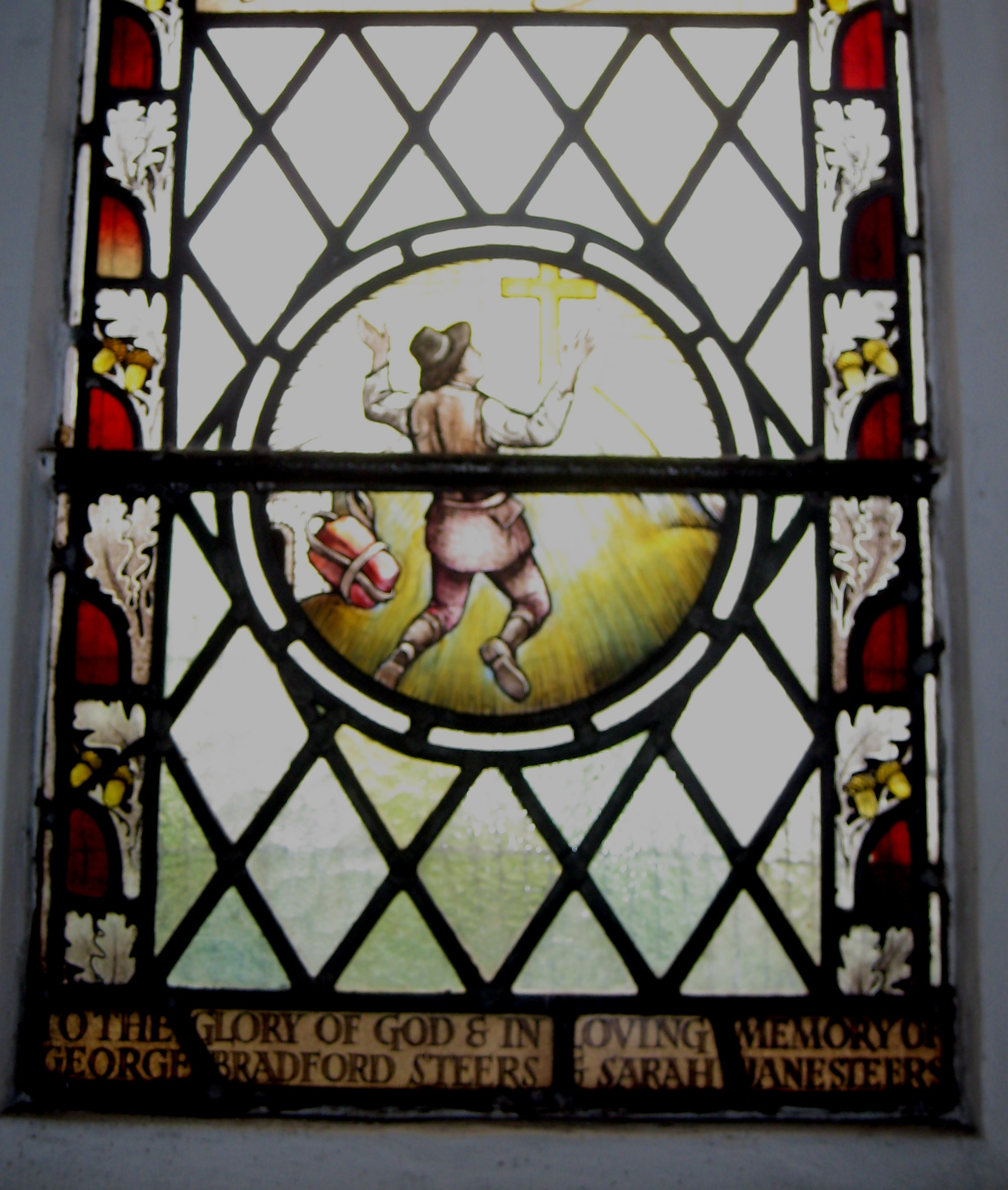
St Matthew's Church Bristol. Bunyan Roundel. Christian casts off his burden

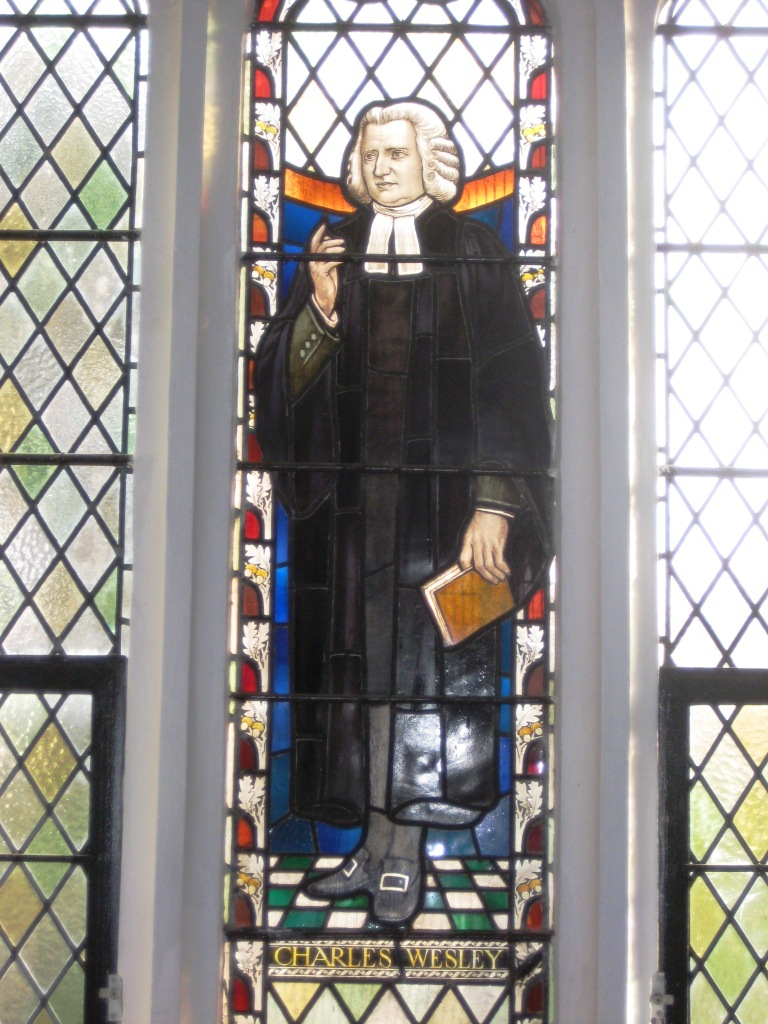
St Matthew's Church Bristol- Wesley

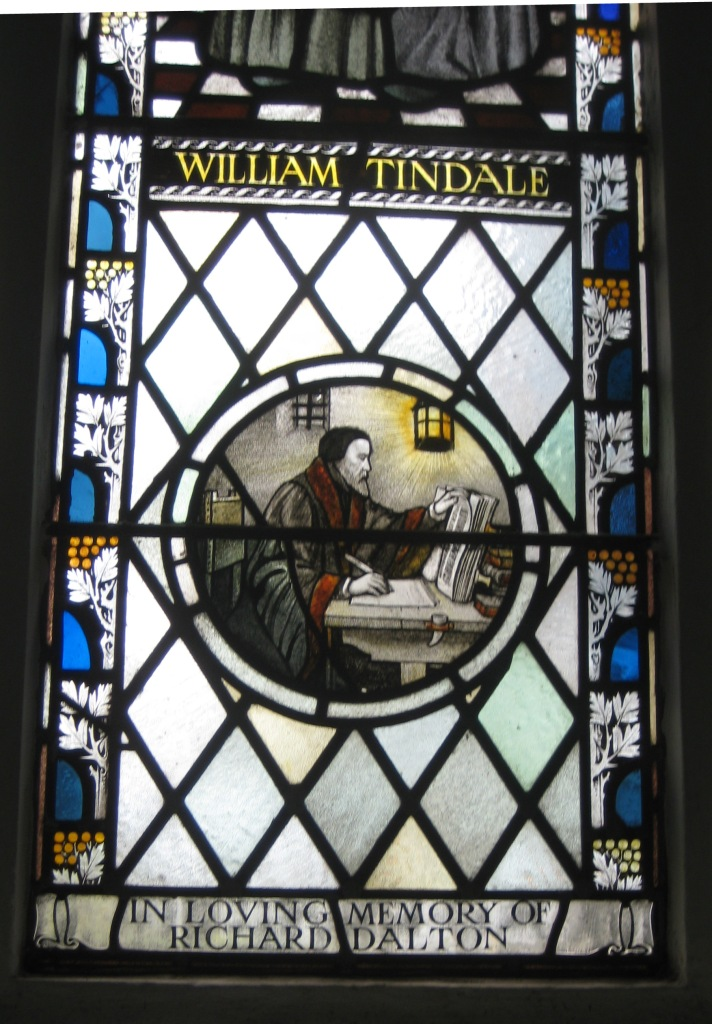
St Matthew's Church Bristol-Tyndale Roundel

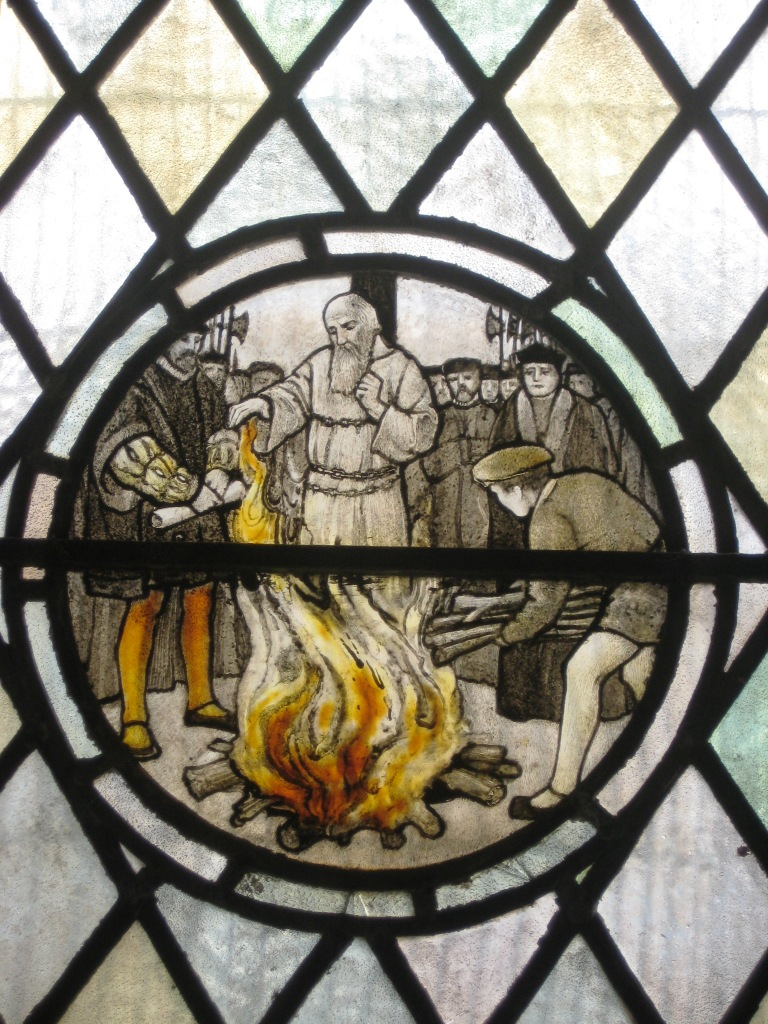
St Matthew's Church Bristol-Cranmer before the stake

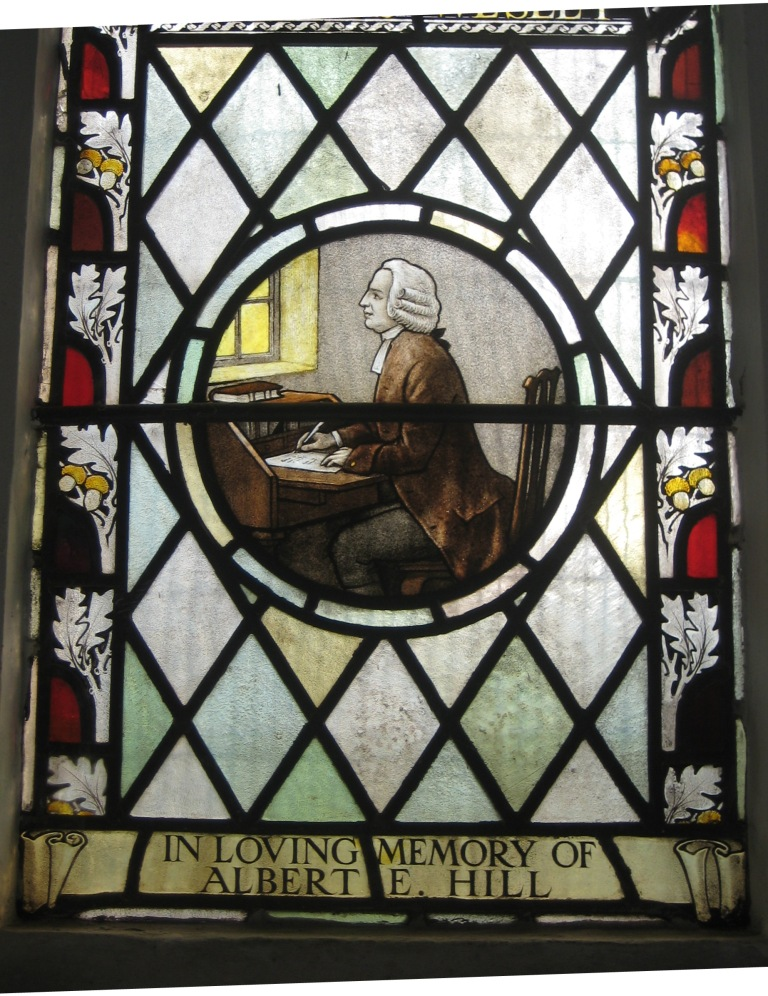
St Matthew's Church Bristol. Wesley Roundel

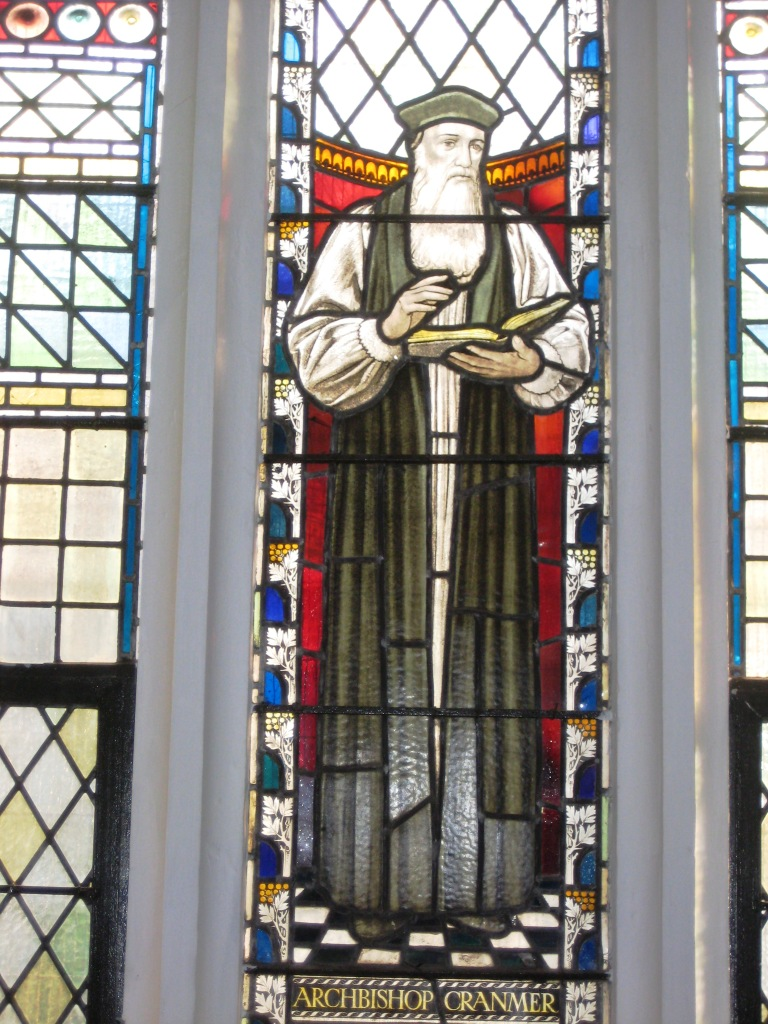
St Matthew's Church Bristol-Cranmer

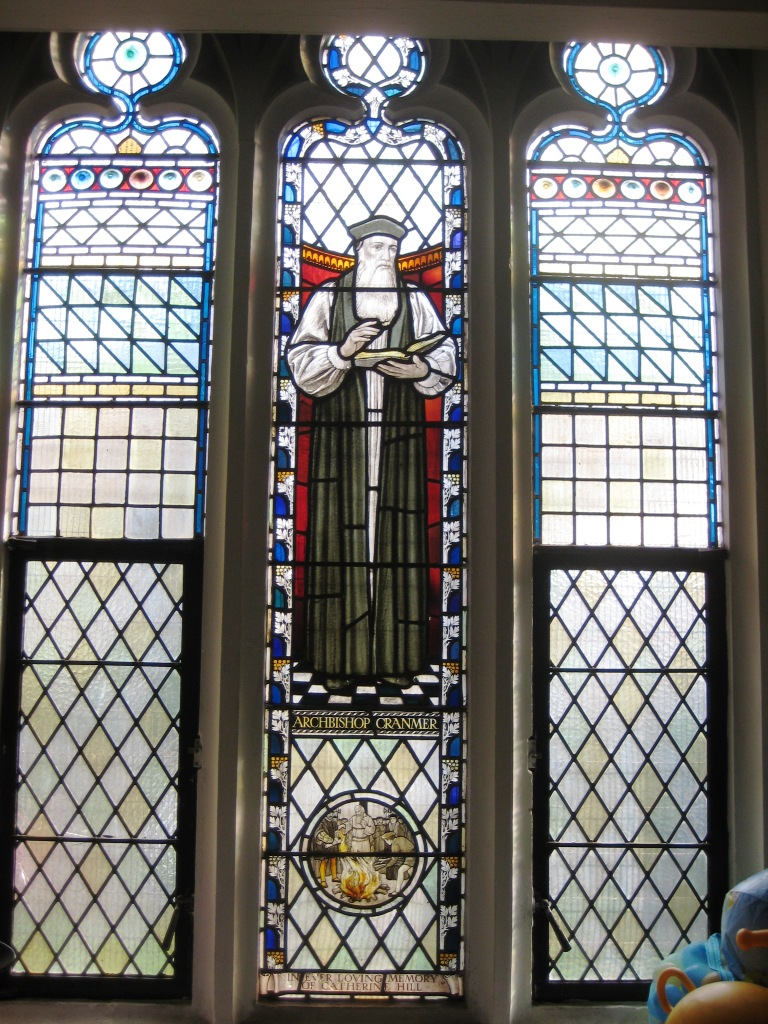
St Matthew's Church Bristol

=== Tyndale Baptist Church ===
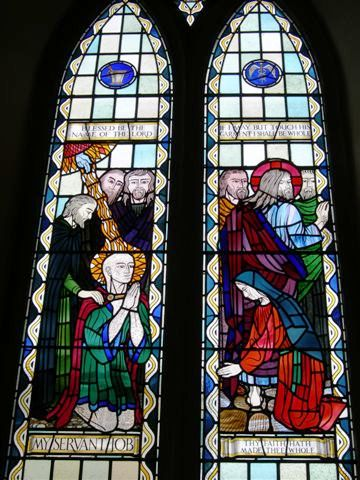
"Suffering and Healing" Tyndale Baptist Church. A Geoffrey Robinson window

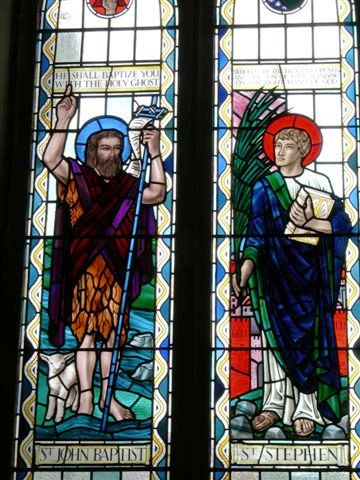
A Geoffrey Robinson/Daphne Robinson window dedicated to Arnold Robinson in Tyndale Baptist Church

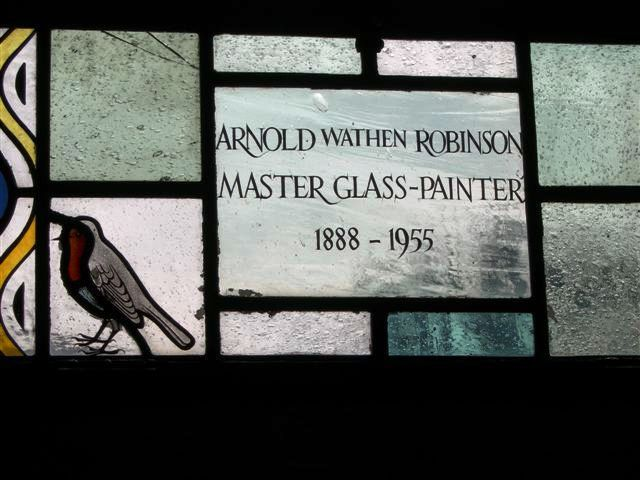
Dedication on the St John the Baptist/St Stephen window executed by Geoffrey and Daphne Robinson.

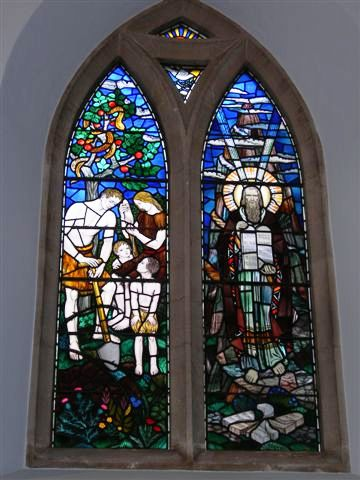
Window in Tyndale Baptist Church by Arnold Wathen Robinson

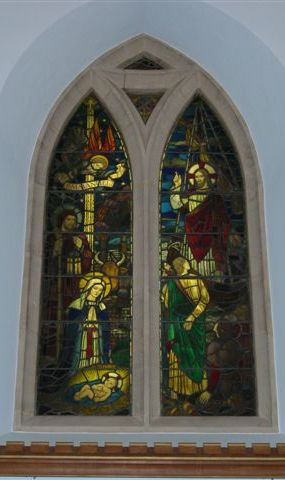
Window in Tyndale Baptist Church by Arnold Wathen Robinson.

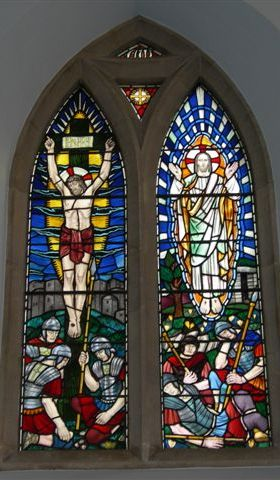
Window in Tyndale Baptist Church by Arnold Wathen Robinson.

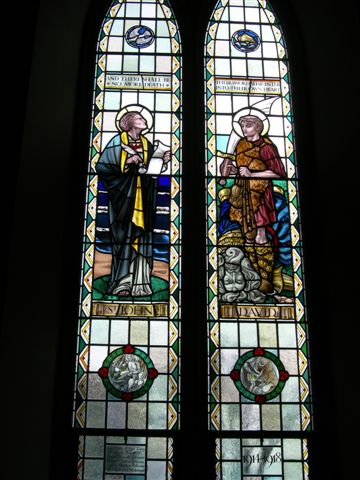
War Memorial Window Tyndale Baptist Church by Arnold Wathen Robinson.

== Bibliography ==
- Beaty, David. (1995). "Light Perpetual-Aviators’ Memorial Windows". Airlife. ISBN 1853105880.
- Foyle, Andrew and Nikolaus Pevsner. (2011). "The Buildings of England. Somerset: North and Bristol." Yale University Press. ISBN 9780300126587.
- Whittingham, Sarah. (2003). "Wills Memorial Building". University of Bristol, Centre for Curriculum & Assessment Studies. Number 1. ISBN 0-86292-541-X.
