= Lord's Wood, Pensford =

Woodland in Bristol, United Kingdom

Coordinates: 51°21′55″N 2°31′37″W

Lord's Wood
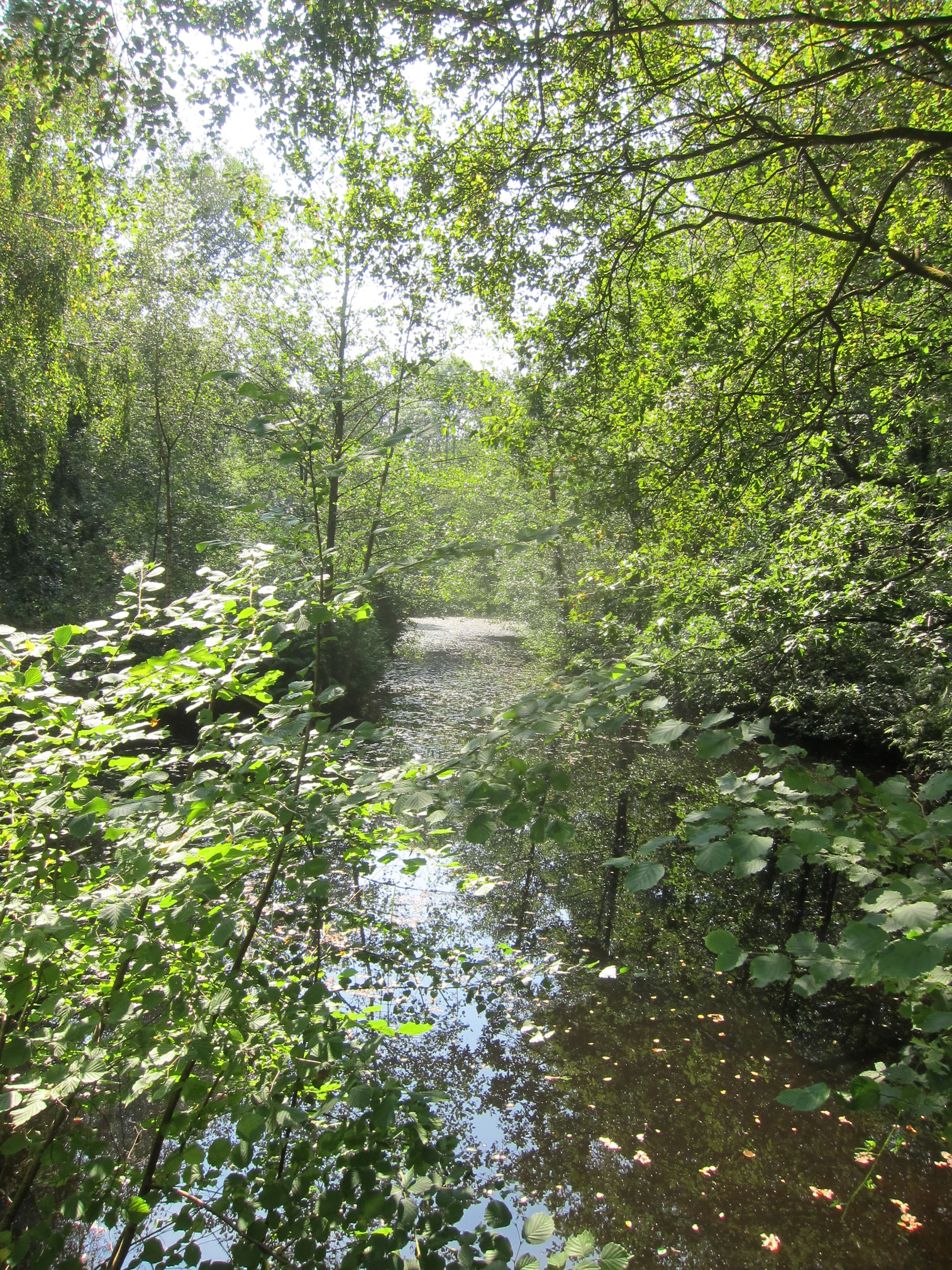
- A shady woodland pool in Lords Wood
- Interactive map of Lord's Wood

Geography
- Location: Somerset, England

Ecology
- Indicator plants: Narrow buckler fern, wild daffodil
- Fauna: Chalcosyrphus eunotus, silver-washed fritillary, white admiral, common pipistrelle

Lord's Wood is a woodland southeast of the village of Pensford in the Chew Valley, south of Bristol, England.

The wood largely consists of planted conifers, however some broad-leaved areas remain.

A number of small streams flow northward through the wood, converging and then eventually meeting the River Chew to the north.

There is a well-vegetated pond near the centre of the wood.

Hunstrete Lake lies just to the southeast of the wood.

== Biodiversity ==
The wood contains a variety of wildlife. Roe deer, badger, grey squirrel and fallow deer have been seen in the wood, along with woodland birds such as the great spotted woodpecker, nuthatch and treecreeper.

It is one of a very small number of sites in Britain at which the Red Data Book hoverfly Chalcosyrphus eunotus has been found. A wide range of butterflies occurs here, including silver-washed fritillary and white admiral. A number of bat species have also been recorded at the site including the common pipistrelle, soprano pipistrelle, noctule, Daubenton's bat and lesser horseshoe bat.

Locally scarce plants include narrow buckler fern (Dryopteris carthusiana) and wild daffodil (Narcissus pseudonarcissus ssp. pseudonarcissus).
