= Hunstrete Lake =

Lake in Somerset, England

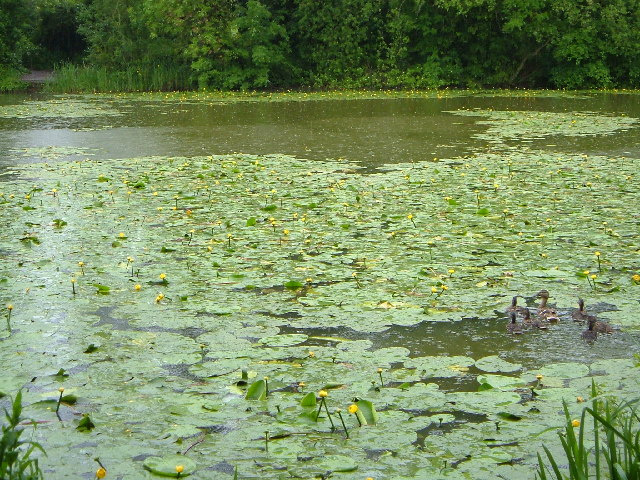

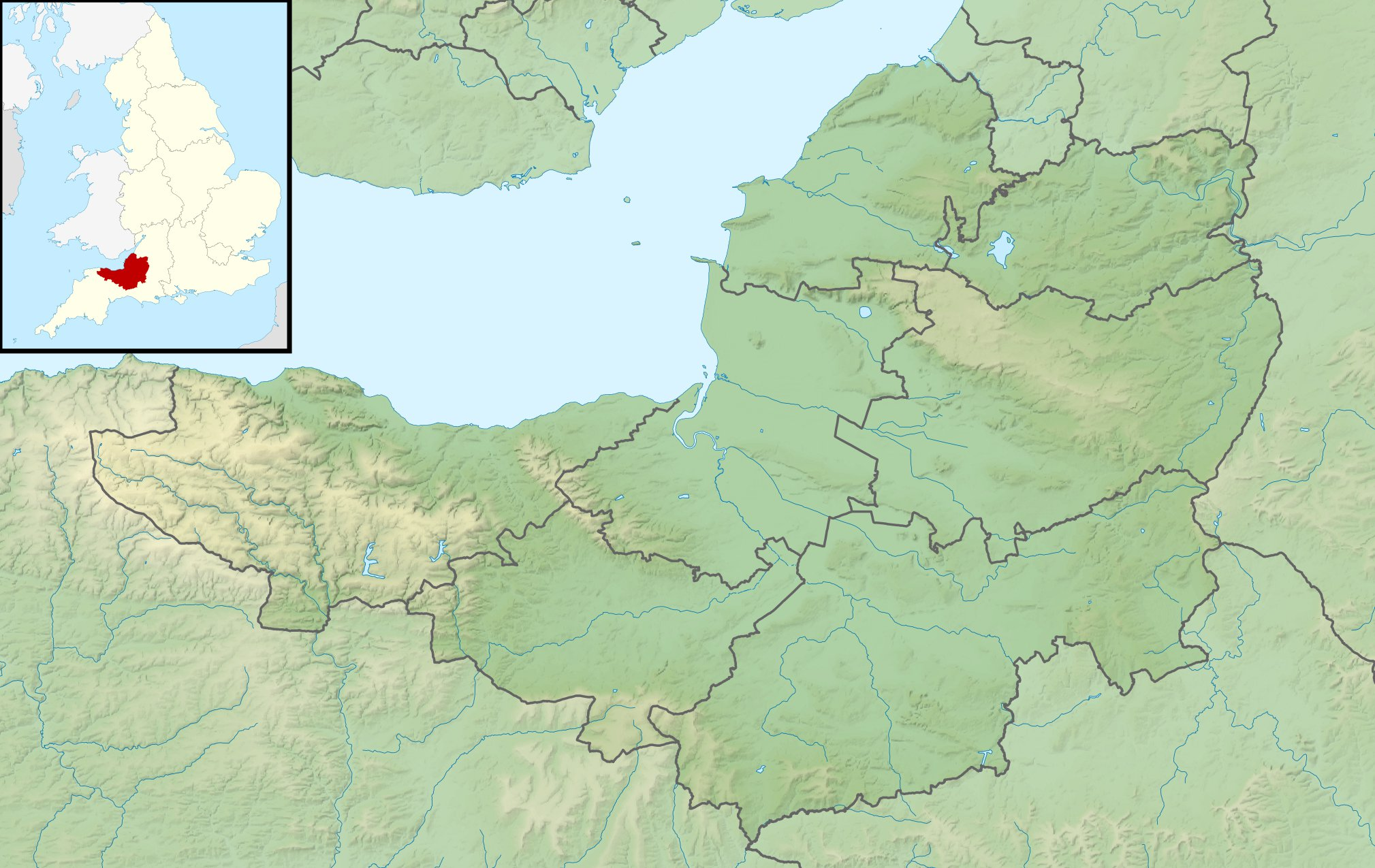
- Location within Somerset
- Location: Somerset, England
- Coordinates: 51.35776°N 2.50979°W

Hunstrete Lake (grid reference ST646622) is a mature lake of 5 acres (20,000 m^{2}). Two new lakes of 3.5 acres (14,000 m^{2}) were constructed alongside in the 1990s. They are situated just to the south of the village of Hunstrete, Somerset; south of Bristol, and 7 miles (11 km) west of Bath. It is surrounded by a belt of trees, and at the north-west end this merges into Lord's Wood, Pensford.

The lakes are used for angling, and are noted for their carp and tench.

== Biodiversity ==
The lake is a breeding site for great crested grebe; there is also a large breeding population of common toad. A number of bat species have also been recorded at the site including the common pipistrelle Pipistrellus pipistrellus, soprano pipistrelle Pipistrellus pygmaeus, noctule Nyctalus noctula, Daubenton's bat Myotis daubentonii and lesser horseshoe bat Rhinolophus hipposideros.

The scarce violet helleborine orchid is found in small quantities in the woodland along the north edge of the first pond to the west of the main lake.

== Bibliography ==
- Susan Elizabeth Caola. 2003 Hunstrete, Truth and Legend – the story of a country estate ISBN 0-9546239-0-8
