= Pensford Viaduct =

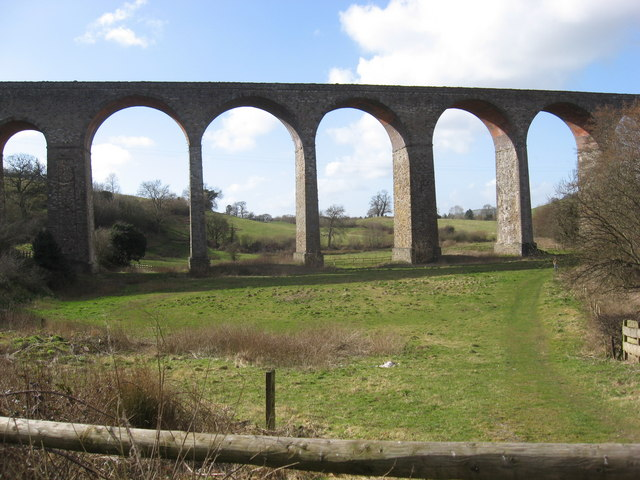
- Coordinates: 51.3708°N 2.5515°W
- Carries: Bristol and North Somerset Railway
- Crosses: River Chew
- Locale: Pensford, Somerset, England
- Owner: Highways Agency Historical Railways Estate
- Heritage status: Grade II listed building
- BRB (Residuary) Ltd: FNS3/17m 4ch

Characteristics
- Material: Stone and brick
- Total length: 995 feet (303 m)
- Height: 95 feet (29 m)
- No. of spans: 16

History
- Construction start: 1874
- Closed: 1968

Location
- Interactive map of Pensford Viaduct

Pensford Viaduct is a disused railway bridge in the village of Pensford, within the historic English county of Somerset, now unitary authority Bath and North East Somerset. It is a Grade II listed building. The viaduct was 330 yards long; the track has since been lifted but the arches still remain today.

== History ==
The viaduct was built in 1874 to carry the Bristol and North Somerset Railway over the valley of the River Chew. The contractor was J. Perry, of Tredegar Works, Bow. During construction the bridge failed and had to be rebuilt.

The last scheduled passenger train to cross the viaduct was the 9:25 a.m. from Frome to Bristol on 31 October 1959; after that there were only goods trains (mainly bringing coal from Radstock), which ceased in 1964, and very occasional excursion trains. It officially closed after the Chew Stoke flood of 1968 which damaged the viaduct and other buildings in Pensford and the wider Chew Valley.

The viaduct was offered for sale for £1, in 1984; however, the likely maintenance costs were prohibitive and no one bought it. It became the property of BRB (Residuary) Ltd which took over some of the assets of the British Railways Board when it was privatised. In September 2013, BRB (Residuary) Ltd was abolished, with assets being transferred to the Highways Agency as part of the Historical Railways Estate.

In 2014 a new microbrewery in Pensford known as the Chew Valley Brewery used a depiction of the viaduct as its logo.

== Architecture ==
Construction is of stone piers and spandrels with red brick soffits. The viaduct is 995 feet (303 m) long, reaches a maximum height of 95 feet (29 m) to rail level and consists of sixteen arches. The arches are of different widths and heights and supported by tall, tapering piers in the centre and thicker shorter ones towards the sides. Arches 5 and 13 are lower than the others dividing the bridge into sections with four higher arches at each end.

Subsequent repairs were made with concrete rather than stone, though it was dressed to look similar to the surrounding stone.

== Pensford railway station ==
Pensford
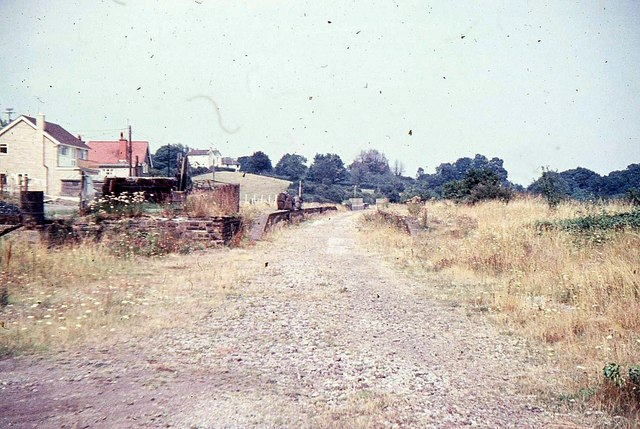
- The site of the station in 1972

General information
- Location: Pensford, Somerset; England
- Coordinates: 51.3733°N 2.5517°W
- Grid reference: ST616639
- Platforms: 2

Other information
- Status: Disused

History
- Original company: Great Western Railway
- Pre-grouping: Great Western Railway
- Post-grouping: Great Western Railway; Western Region of British Railways

Key dates
- 3 September 1873: Opened
- 2 November 1959: Closed to passengers
- 15 June 1964: Closed completely
Location

Pensford railway station served the village of Pensford, Somerset, England from 1873 to 1964 on the Bristol and North Somerset Railway, ceasing operations at the same time as the nearby viaduct. The station opened on 3 September 1873 by the Great Western Railway. It was situated on the Station Approach road. In 1898, the platforms were extended and a new signal box opened on the south end of the up platform. The principal traffic was coal and passengers. The track ran through the viaduct. The station closed to passengers on 2 November 1959 and to goods traffic on 15 June 1964.

Preceding station	Disused railways	Following station
Whitchurch Halt; Line and station closed	Great Western Railway; Bristol and North Somerset Railway	Clutton; Line and station closed
