= Belluton =

Coordinates: 51.3773°N 2.5525°W

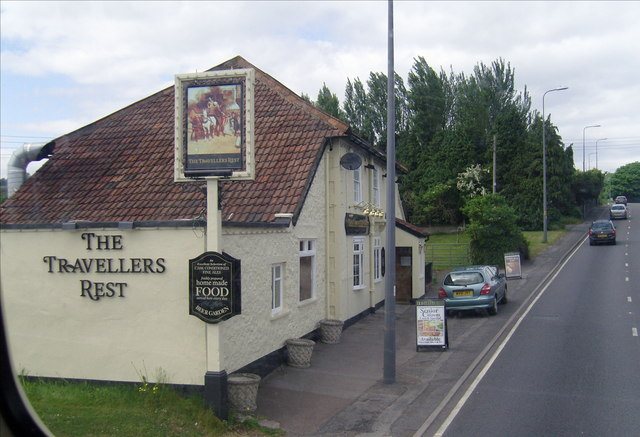
- The Traveller's Rest, Belluton

- Location within Somerset
- Population: approx. 100
- OS grid reference: ST615644
- Civil parish: Publow
- Unitary authority: Bath and North East Somerset
- Ceremonial county: Somerset
- Region: South West
- Country: England
- Sovereign state: United Kingdom
- Post town: BRISTOL
- Postcode district: BS39
- Dialling code: 01275
- Police: Avon and Somerset
- Fire: Avon
- Ambulance: South Western
- UK Parliament: North East Somerset and Hanham

Norton Malreward	Belluton
Stanton Drew	Belluton	Publow
	Pensford

Belluton is a village in Somerset, England. It is in the district of Bath and North East Somerset and is located due south of the city of Bristol and due west of the city of Bath. The eastern end of the village is defined by the A37 road.

In some documents it is alternatively called "Belton", which signifies, according to some antiquaries, "Baal town," or "the Town of the Sun". According to Robinson it was called Belgetona in the 1086 Domesday Book, and the name comes from the Old English belgae and tun, the Belgae being a violent race who settled in what is now Wiltshire.

It is close to the route of the ancient Wansdyke.

== Government and politics ==
Belluton is part of the civil parish of Publow, which has a parish council with some responsibility for local issues. Belluton is part of the Publow and Whitchurch Ward which is represented by one councillor on the Bath and North East Somerset Unitary Authority which has wider responsibilities for services such as education, refuse, tourism etc.

The village is a part of the North East Somerset and Hanham constituency. Prior to Brexit in 2020, it was part of the South West England constituency of the European Parliament.

== Demographics ==
According to the 2001 Census, the Publow and Whitchurch Ward (which includes Pensford and Publow), had 1,087 residents, living in 429 households, with an average age of 40.8 years. Of these 73% of residents describing their health as 'good', 24% of 16- to 74-year-olds had no qualifications; and the area had an unemployment rate of 2.3% of all economically active people aged 16–74. In the Index of Multiple Deprivation 2004, it was ranked at 26,408 out of 32,482 wards in England, where 1 was the most deprived LSOA and 32,482 the least deprived.

== Buildings ==
=== John Locke's Cottage ===
John Locke lived in Belluton during his childhood. His father was a small landowner and attorney at the local village of Pensford. John Locke's Cottage is now a Grade II listed building.

=== Other Grade II listed buildings ===
Other Grade II listed buildings include Belluton House, from the early 19th century, and The Grange from the 18th century.

== Bibliography ==
- Durham, I. & M. (1991). Chew Magna and the Chew Valley in old photographs. Redcliffe Press. ISBN 1-872971-61-X.
- Janes, Rowland, ed. (1987). The Natural History of the Chew Valley. ISBN 0-9545125-2-9.
