= Pensford =

Village in Somerset, England

Coordinates: 51.3710°N 2.5466°W

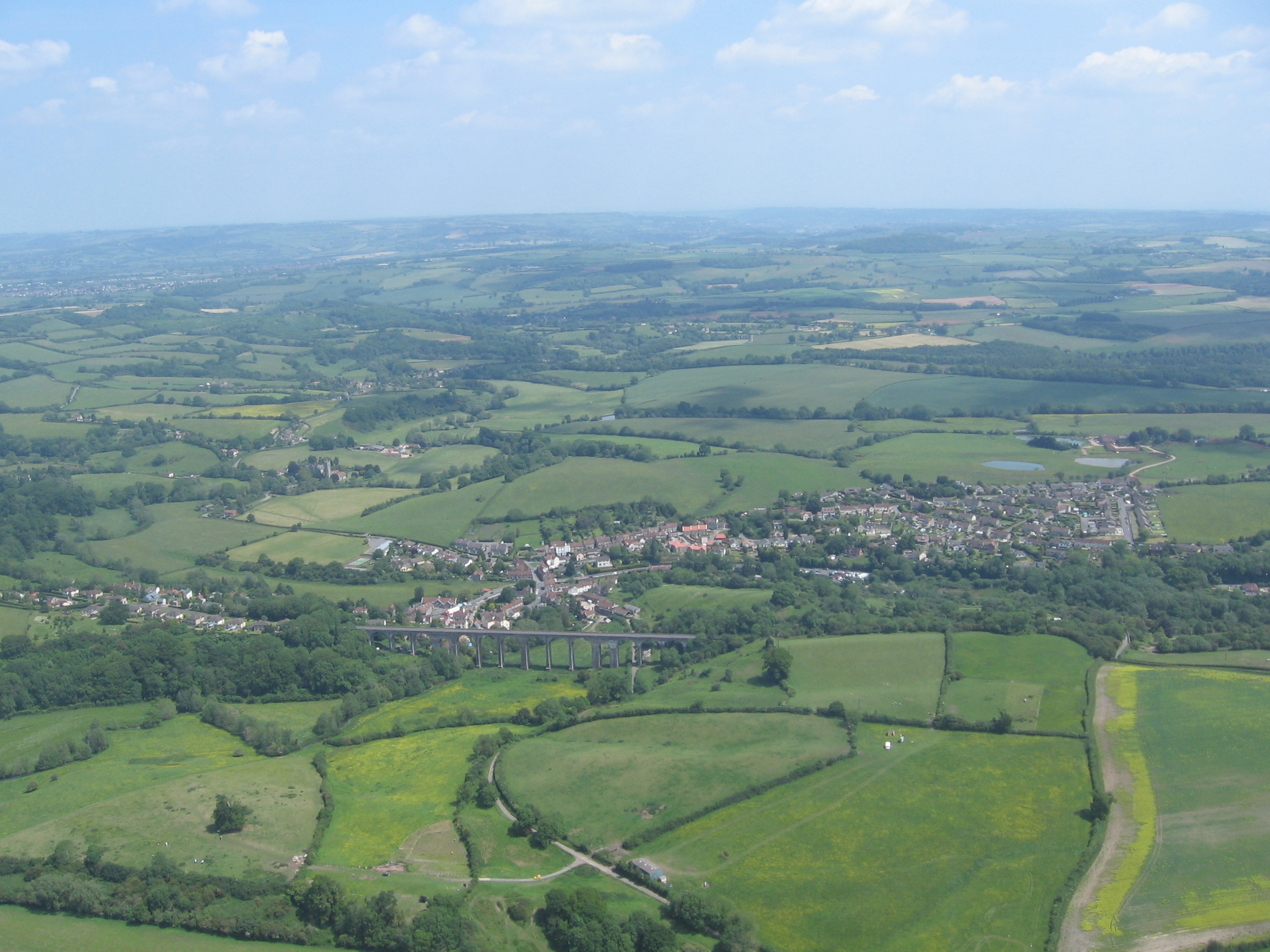
- Aerial photo of Pensford with the Pensford Viaduct in the foreground

- Location within Somerset
- Population: approx. 1,000
- OS grid reference: ST619637
- Civil parish: Publow
- Unitary authority: Bath and North East Somerset
- Ceremonial county: Somerset
- Region: South West
- Country: England
- Sovereign state: United Kingdom
- Post town: Bristol
- Postcode district: BS39
- Dialling code: 01761
- Police: Avon and Somerset
- Fire: Avon
- Ambulance: South Western
- UK Parliament: North East Somerset and Hanham

	Belluton	Publow
Stanton Drew	Pensford
Stanton Wick	Chelwood

Pensford is the largest village in the civil parish of Publow in Somerset, England. It lies in the Chew Valley, approximately 7 miles (11 km) south of Bristol, 8 miles (13 km) west of Bath, and 14 miles (23 km) north of Wells. It is on the A37 road from Bristol to Shepton Mallet.

Pensford was identified as being of special architectural and historic interest and was designated as a Conservation Area in May 1988.

== History ==
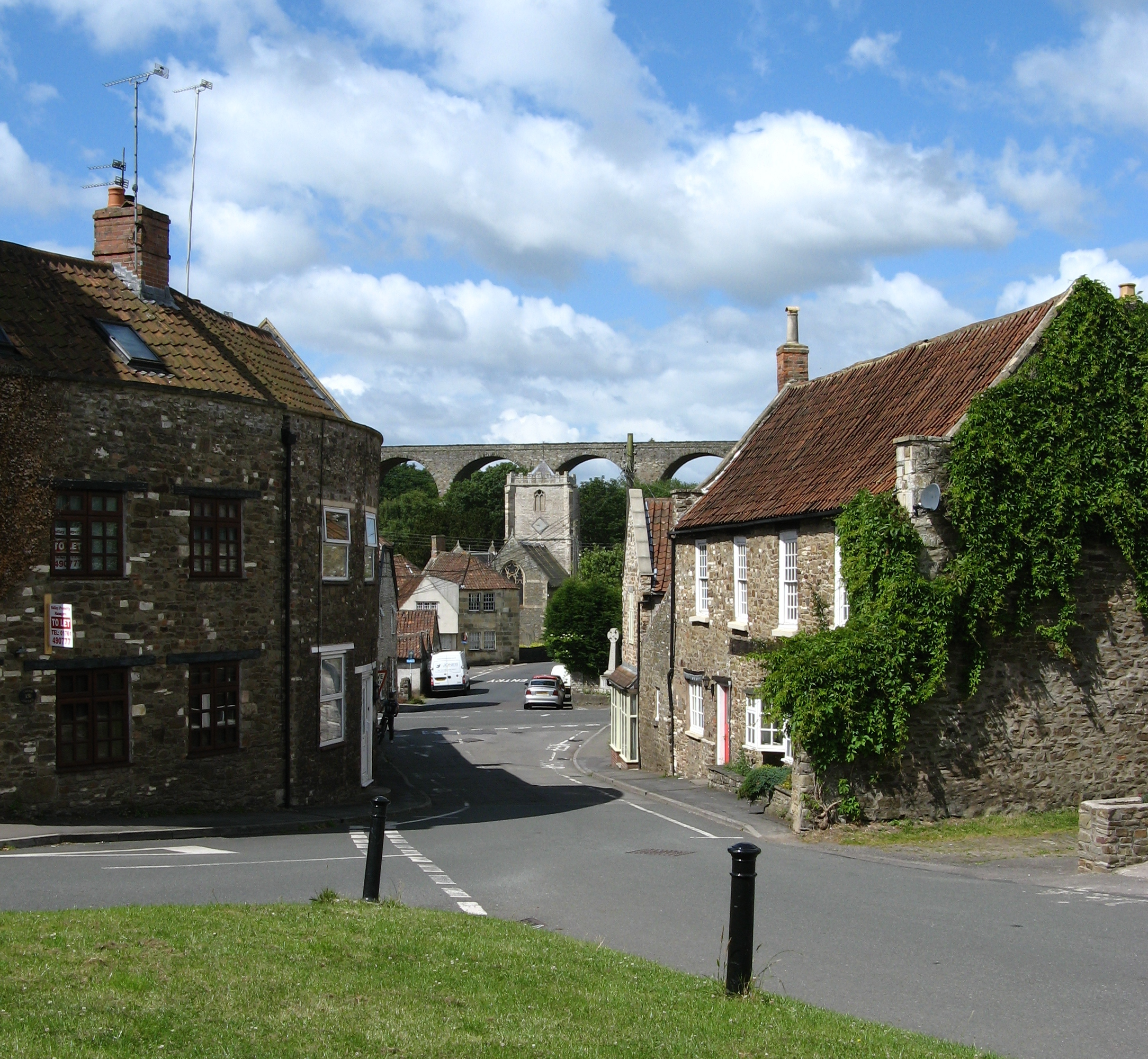
High Street

The name Pensford is in all likelihood derived from Brythonic Penffordd, meaning roughly 'top of the road' or 'the highest or furthest point of the road'. Alternatively, it may mean 'The animal pens by the ford' from the Old English pens and ford.

The parish of Pensford was part of the Keynsham Hundred,

During the 14th to 16th centuries Pensford was a cloth centre based on local wool.

On 24 June 1685 rebel forces camped at Pensford during the Monmouth Rebellion.

=== Coal mining ===
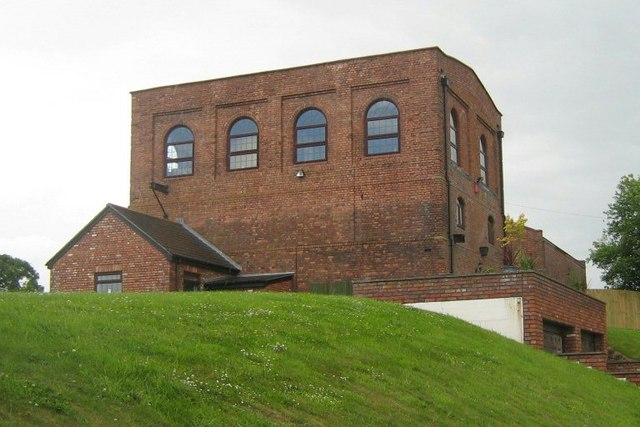
The winding engine house at Pensford Colliery

During the 19th and 20th centuries, the main industry was coal mining, with Pensford and the surrounding area forming a major part of the Somerset coalfield. Pensford and Bromley Collieries Ltd opened Pensford colliery to mine the Pensford syncline in 1909. By 1947, the mines output was 70,000 tons per annum. The colliery was connected by a spur of the North Somerset Railway.

The mine was prone to flooding and coal dust explosions. In 1931, Parliament discussed the safety record of the Somerset coalfield showing that between 1927 and 1930, 206 miners were injured in accidents, and 2 miners died at the colliery. In the early 1920s, the Minors Welfare Institute was founded and paid for by the miners. The Institute helped widows and held benevolent events.

The mine was deemed uneconomical and closed in 1955. Its site was used as the depot for Filer's Coaches and was later converted to residential property.

=== 1968 Floods ===
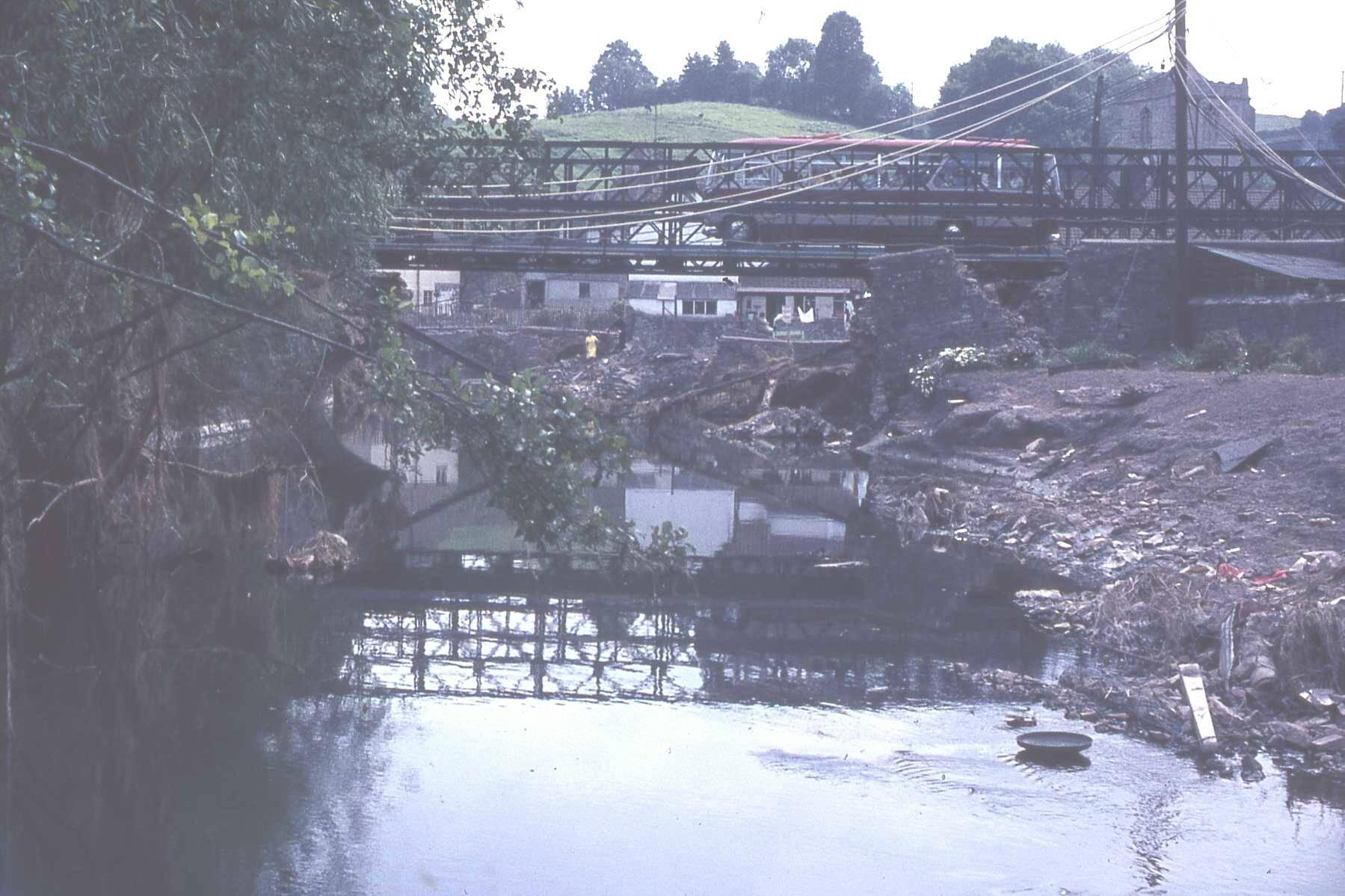
Bailey Bridge temporarily replacing the A37 Bridge washed away in the 1968 floods in Pensford

The River Chew suffered a major flood in 1968 with serious damage to towns and villages along its route. The flood swept away the bridge over the A37 and damaged the railway viaduct so badly that it never reopened. On 10–11 July, a storm brought heavy rainfall to the valley, with 175 millimetres (7 in) falling in 18 hours on Chew Stoke, double the area's average rainfall for the whole of July.

== Government and politics ==
Pensford and Publow has its own parish council which has some responsibility for local issues, including setting an annual precept (local rate) to cover the council's operating costs and producing annual accounts for public scrutiny. The parish council evaluates local planning applications and works with the local police, district council officers, and neighbourhood watch groups on matters of crime, security, and traffic. The parish council's role also includes initiating projects for the maintenance and repair of parish facilities, such as the village hall or community centre, playing fields and playgrounds, as well as consulting with the district council on the maintenance, repair, and improvement of highways, drainage, footpaths, public transport, and street cleaning. Conservation matters (including trees and listed buildings) and environmental issues are also of interest to the council.

It is part of the Publow and Whitchurch Ward which is represented by one councillor on the Bath and North East Somerset Unitary Authority which was created in 1996, as established by the Local Government Act 1992. It provides a single tier of local government with responsibility for almost all local government functions within its area including local planning and building control, local roads, council housing, environmental health, markets and fairs, refuse collection, recycling, cemeteries, crematoria, leisure services, parks, and tourism. It is also responsible for education, social services, libraries, main roads, public transport, trading standards, waste disposal and strategic planning, although fire, police and ambulance services are provided jointly with other authorities through the Avon Fire and Rescue Service, Avon and Somerset Constabulary, and the Great Western Ambulance Service.

Bath and North East Somerset's area covers part of the ceremonial county of Somerset but it is administered independently of the non-metropolitan county. Its administrative headquarters is in Bath. Between 1 April 1974 and 1 April 1996, it was the Wansdyke district and the City of Bath of the county of Avon. Before 1974 that the parish was part of the Clutton Rural District.

The village falls within the Publow and Whitchurch electoral ward. From Pensford the ward strikes north to end at Whitchurch on the Bristol border. The total population of this ward taken from the 2011 census was 2,473.

The parish is represented in the House of Commons of the Parliament of the United Kingdom as part of North East Somerset and Hanham. It elects one Member of Parliament (MP) by the first past the post system of election.

== Demographics ==
According to the 2001 Census, the Publow and Whitchurch Ward (which includes Belluton and Publow), had 1,087 residents, living in 429 households, with an average age of 40.8 years. Of these 73% of residents describing their health as 'good', 24% of 16- to 74-year-olds had no qualifications; and the area had an unemployment rate of 2.3% of all economically active people aged 16–74. In the Index of Multiple Deprivation 2004, it was ranked at 26,408 out of 32,482 wards in England, where 1 was the most deprived LSOA and 32,482 the least deprived.

== Buildings ==
=== St Thomas à Becket Church ===
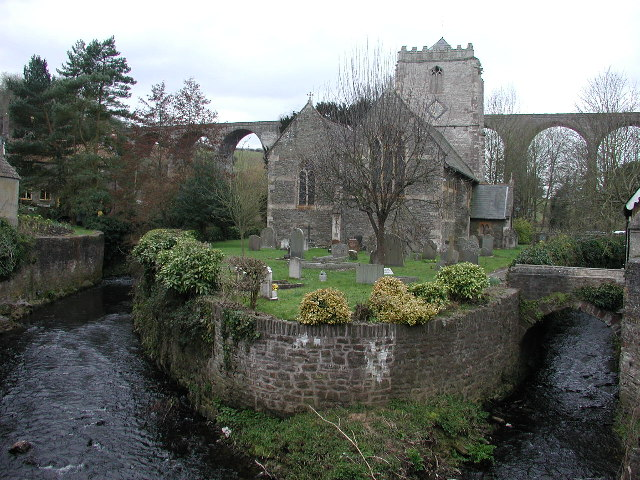
St Thomas à Becket Church

First built in the 14th century, the St Thomas à Becket Church is a Grade II* listed building

Following damage in the 1968 floods the church was deconsecrated. During the 1980s an attempt was made to turn it into an arts centre but this was abandoned when the extent of the repairs required to make the building safe became clear. In 2007 the church was put on the market for redevelopment, and in 2008 purchased for repair and use as a private dwelling. The redevelopment of the church into a private dwelling was featured in the first episode of television series Restoration Home.

=== The lock-up ===
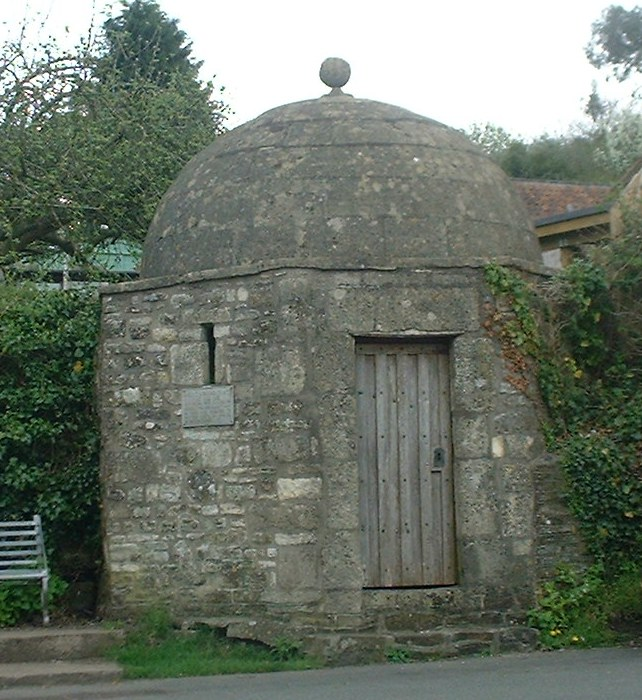
The lock-up

Pensford has an octagonal eighteenth-century village lock-up. This is a Grade II listed building and is a Scheduled Ancient Monument.

=== Pubs ===
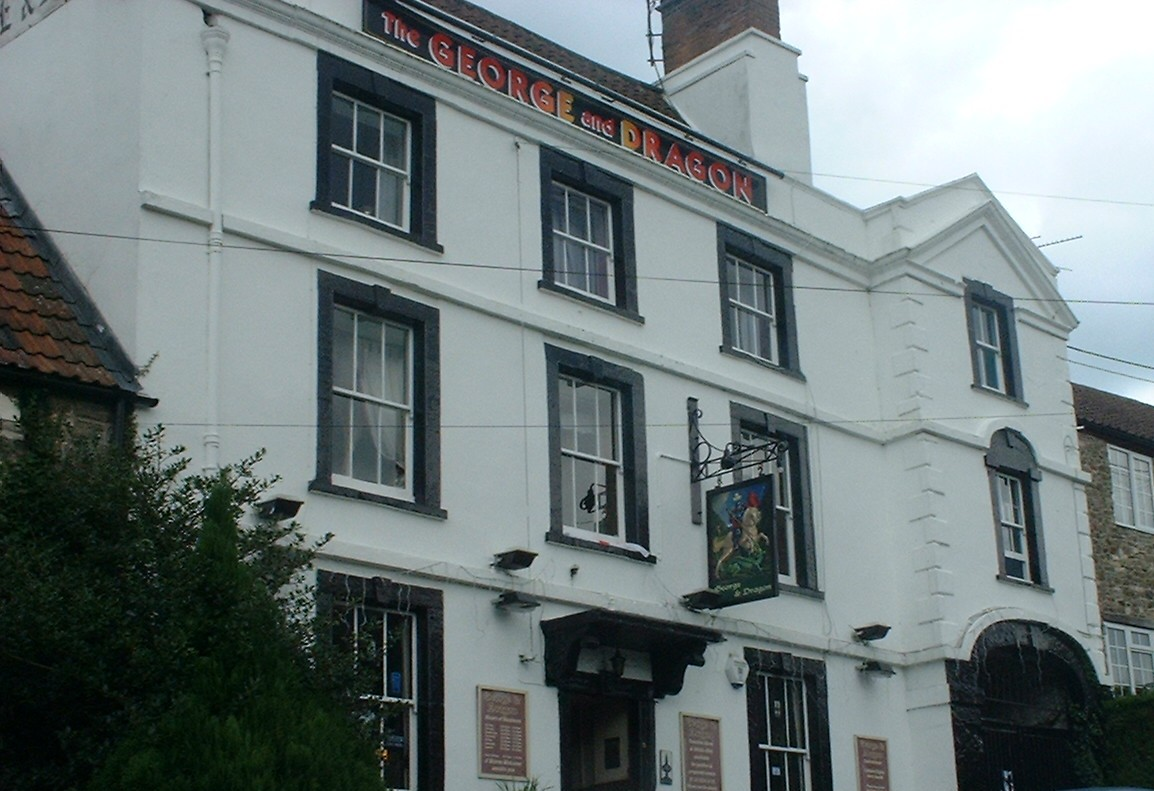
George and Dragon

Pensford has three pubs: the Travellers Rest, the Rising Sun, and the George and Dragon. During the 17th and 18th centuries Pensford was an important staging post for stage coaches which stopped at the George and Dragon and the Rising Sun. The George and Dragon dates from 1752 and is a Grade II listed building.

=== Other Grade II listed buildings ===
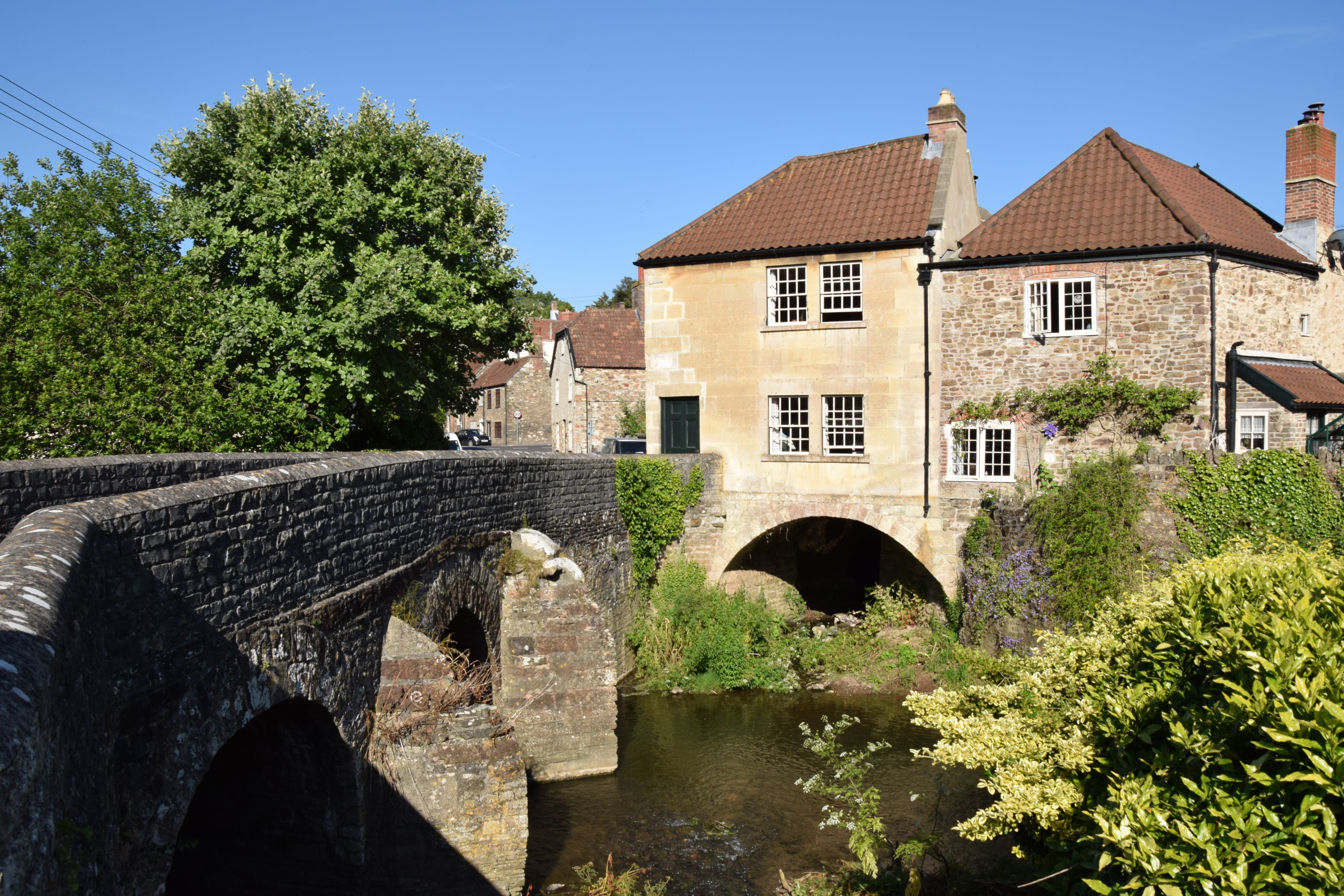
Bridge over the River Chew and Bridge House, both Grade II listed buildings

- 149 High Street
- Bridge House
- Bridge over the River Chew
- Gill's G.V. Shoe Shop
- 129-131 High Street
- Old Bakery
- Guy's Farm
- Viaduct View

The village's war memorial is also grade II listed and commemorates the seven people from the village who died in each of World War I and World War II. It is a wheel cross, with a Celtic-style carving.

For centuries Pensford has been an important crossing point on the River Chew. The modern road bridge was rebuilt in 1968 after flood damage, but the much older (1839–85) bridge, by the church, survived the flood.

On the western side of the village is Pensford Viaduct on the disused Bristol and North Somerset Railway, built in 1873 but closed to trains in 1968 after the great flood of Pensford, after which it was deemed unsafe. The last passenger train had been earlier: the 9:25 a.m. from Frome to Bristol on 31 October 1959; after that there were only goods trains (mainly bringing coal from Radstock), which ceased in 1964, and very occasional excursion trains. Pensford viaduct is 995 feet (303 m) long, reaches a maximum height of 95 feet (29 m) to rail level and consists of sixteen arches. The viaduct is now a Grade II listed building.

== Surrounding area ==
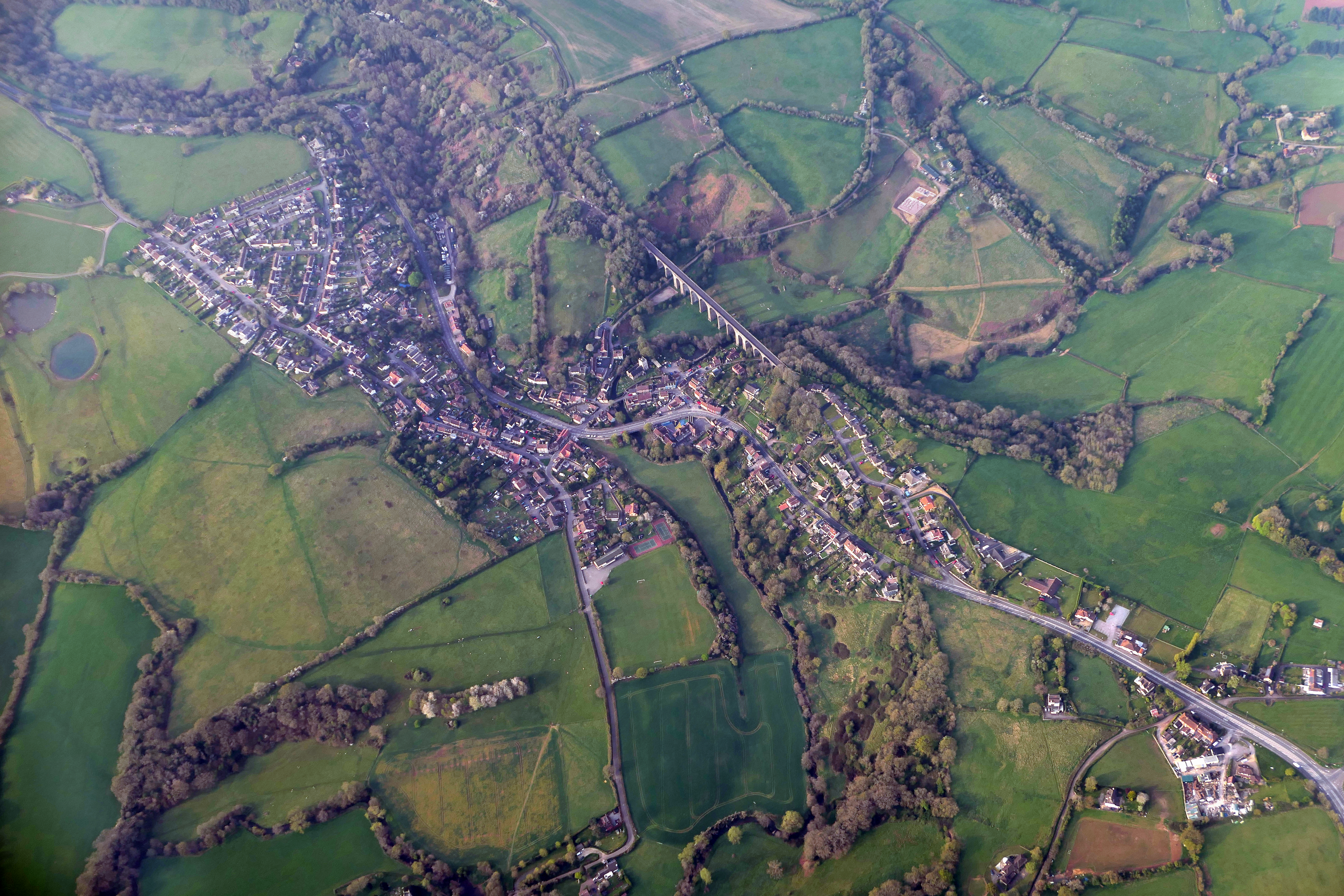
Aerial view of the village

Nearby is Lord's Wood, Pensford, and the village is on the route of the Monarch's Way long-distance footpath.

== Notable people ==
- Neil Hudson is notable for winning the 1981 F.I.M. 250cc Motocross World Championship
- Acker Bilk Jazz clarinetist
- Chris Biscoe Jazz musician
- John Locke FRS, Philosopher and physician 1632-1704, known as the 'Father of Liberalism', lived in John Locke's Cottage in Belluton, in the parish of Publow with Pensford, from shortly after his birth until 1647.
- Robert Hunter of the Grateful Dead lived in the village from 1979 to 1981.
- John Perry, guitarist of The Only Ones, lived here between 1972 and 1975.
- Lily Newton botanist and phycologist (1893-1981)

== Bibliography ==
- Durham, I. & M. (1991). Chew Magna and the Chew Valley in old photographs. Redcliffe Press. ISBN 1-872971-61-X.
- Janes, Rowland, ed. (1987). The Natural History of the Chew Valley. ISBN 0-9545125-2-9.
- Baber, Julie (2018). We Remember It Well : Stories of the Great Flood of 1968 from Pensford, Publow and Woollard. PPW Publishing. ISBN 9781527231818. OCLC 1111294246.
