= Publow =

Village in Somerset, England

Coordinates: 51.3787°N 2.5425°W

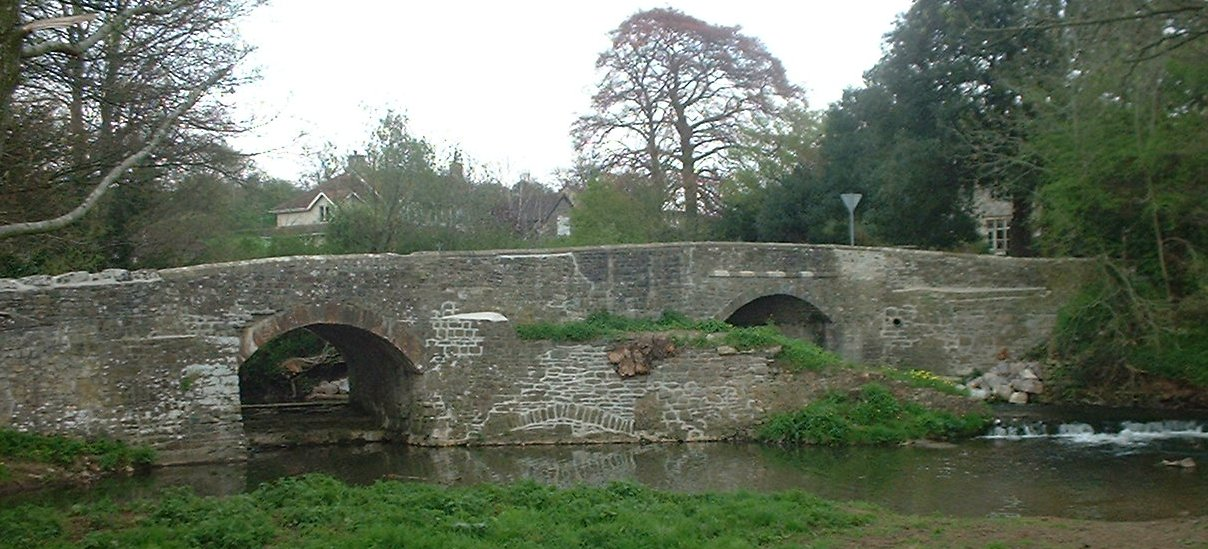
- Bridge over the River Chew

- Location within Somerset
- Population: 1,119 (2011)
- OS grid reference: ST625643
- Civil parish: Publow
- Unitary authority: Bath and North East Somerset
- Ceremonial county: Somerset
- Region: South West
- Country: England
- Sovereign state: United Kingdom
- Post town: BRISTOL
- Postcode district: BS39
- Dialling code: 01761
- Police: Avon and Somerset
- Fire: Avon
- Ambulance: South Western
- UK Parliament: North East Somerset and Hanham

Publow is a small village and civil parish in Bath and North East Somerset, England. It lies beside the River Chew in the Chew Valley. It is 7 miles from Bristol, 9 miles from Bath, and 4 miles from Keynsham. The principal settlement in the parish is Pensford. The parish also includes the village of Belluton and part of the village of Woollard. At the 2011 census it had a population of 1,119.

== History ==
Publow anciently belonged to the St Loes of Newton, and later came into the hands of the Hungerfords along with Compton Dando. The manor having many owners Henry Hastings (Third Earl Becher (c1517-1570)), Sir John Popham, Sir Francis Popham.

It is close to the route of the ancient Wansdyke. The name Publow is believed to mean 'The public meadow' or 'The people's meadow', from the Latin publicus and the Old English leah. An alternative explanation is that the name is directly from West Country Brythonic corresponding to "pobel" (people), corresponding to Modern Cornish "poble n.f, poblow n.pl (people)", giving rise to the local surname of Pople or, was that it was originally Publo or Publoe meaning Priests Hill, the nearest hill still bearing that name.

The parish of Publow was part of the Keynsham Hundred, All Saints' Parish Church in Publow is the resting place of the world famous clarinet player Acker Bilk (1929-2014) and his wife.

== Governance ==
The parish council has responsibility for local issues and falls within the unitary authority of Bath and North East Somerset which was created in 1996, as established by the Local Government Act 1992. It provides a single tier of local government with responsibility for almost all local government functions within their area including local planning and building control, local roads, council housing, environmental health, markets and fairs, refuse collection, recycling, cemeteries, crematoria, leisure services, parks, and tourism. They are also responsible for education, social services, libraries, main roads, public transport, trading standards, waste disposal and strategic planning, although fire, police and ambulance services are provided jointly with other authorities through the Avon Fire and Rescue Service, Avon and Somerset Constabulary and the Great Western Ambulance Service.

Bath and North East Somerset's area covers part of the ceremonial county of Somerset but it is administered independently of the non-metropolitan county. Its administrative headquarters are in Bath. Between 1 April 1974 and 1 April 1996, it was the Wansdyke district and the City of Bath of the county of Avon. Before 1974 the parish was part of the Clutton Rural District.

The parish is represented in the House of Commons of the Parliament of the United Kingdom as part of North East Somerset and Hanham. It elects one Member of Parliament (MP) by the first past the post system of election. It was also part of the South West England constituency of the European Parliament prior to Britain leaving the European Union in January 2020, which elected seven MEPs using the d'Hondt method of party-list proportional representation. Publow has its own parish council, which has some responsibility for local issues and is part of the Publow and Whitchurch Ward, which is represented by one councillor on the Bath and North East Somerset Unitary Authority, which has wider responsibilities for services such as education, refuse, tourism etc. The village is a part of the North East Somerset and Hanham constituency. Prior to Brexit in 2020, it was part of the South West England constituency of the European Parliament.

== Demographics ==
According to the 2001 Census, the Publow and Whitchurch Ward (which includes Belluton and Pensford), had 1,087 residents, living in 429 households, with an average age of 40.8 years. Of these 73% of residents describing their health as 'good', 24% of 16- to 74-year-olds had no qualifications; and the area had an unemployment rate of 2.3% of all economically active people aged 16–74. In the Index of Multiple Deprivation 2004, it was ranked at 26,408 out of 32,482 wards in England, where 1 was the most deprived LSOA and 32,482 the least deprived.

== Buildings ==
=== Church ===
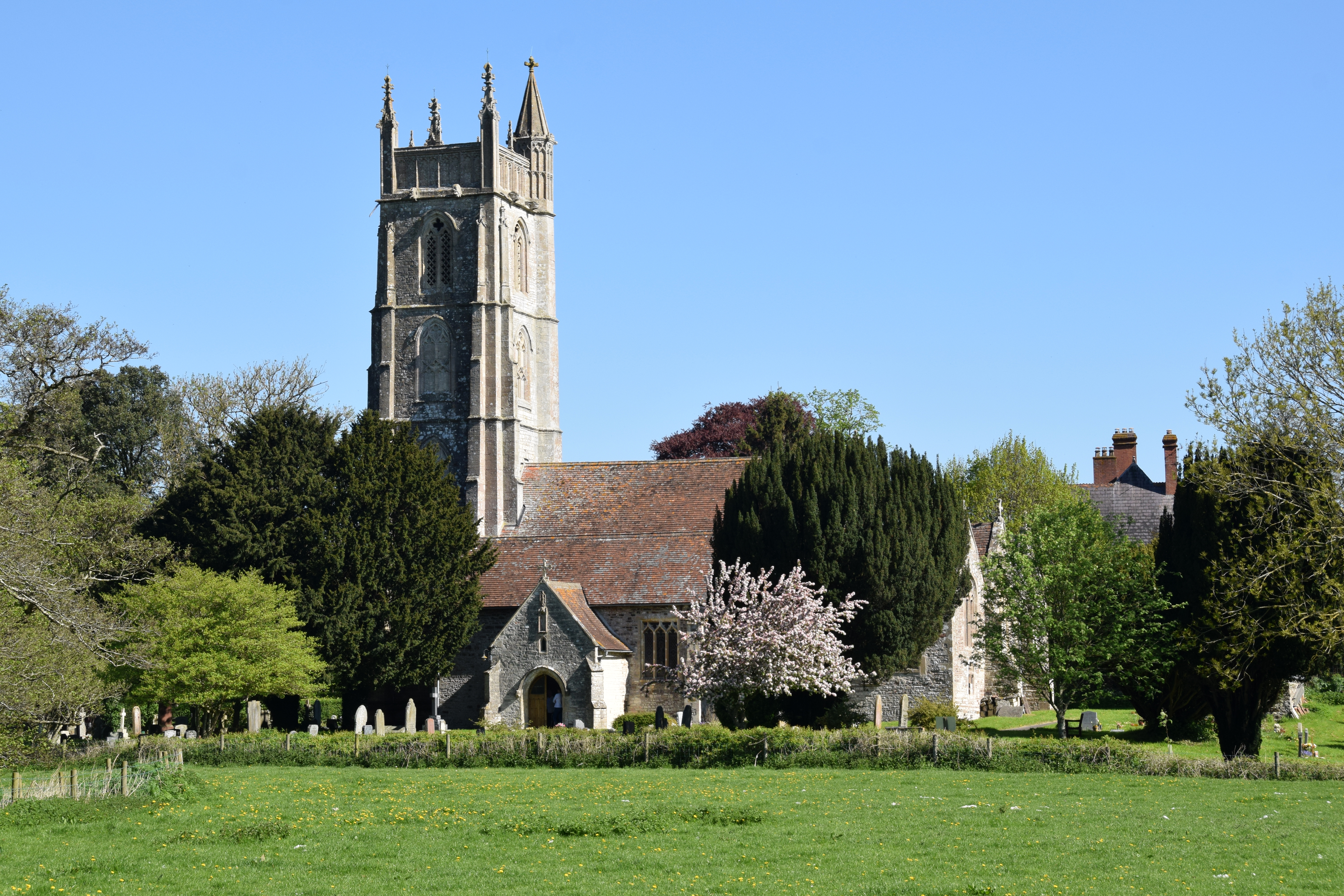
Church of All Saints at Publow

The Church of All Saints dates from the 14th century has a 15th-century tower with gargoyles. The pulpit is Jacobean. It is a Grade I listed building. The church consists of a west tower, nave, north aisle and porch, south aisle and porch, and chancel. The west tower has four stages with set back buttresses terminating in diagonally set pinnacles at the bell chamber stage. The nave has a clerestorey of four 2-light trefoil headed windows. The east end of the chancel has an early Perpendicular (restored) 3-light window with reticulated tracery. The pulpit dates from the early 17th century, and is made of oak with carved, arcaded panels to the upper part and rosettes on the lower part.

== Bridge ==
The bridge over the River Chew dates from the medieval period and was rebuilt and dated 1788 and 1810, and is Grade II listed. The bridge developed a crack and showed other signs of potential weakness, which required extensive renovation work involving an unusual combination of cutting-edge engineering techniques and the use of traditional materials, complicated by the presence of two protected species: Daubenton's bats, which were roosting in cavities under the bridge, and white clawed crayfish in the river below. The renovation by Bath & North East Somerset Council's transportation team, and partner Mott MacDonald, working with experts from English Heritage and the Environment Agency, received a commendation at the Historic Bridge and Infrastructure Awards in London in November 2006, which were sponsored by the Institution of Civil Engineers.

=== Grade II listed buildings ===
- Historic England. "169 AND 170 Blackrock Lane (1129489)". National Heritage List for England.
- Historic England. "Cottle's Farmhouse (1136380)". National Heritage List for England.
- Historic England. "Publow Farmhouse (1136390)". National Heritage List for England.
- Historic England. "Amercombe (1129491)". National Heritage List for England.
- Historic England. "Milestone at NGR ST 6169 6506 (1129490)". National Heritage List for England.
- Historic England. "Old School House (1285549)". National Heritage List for England.
- Historic England. "Parsonage Farmhouse (1129495)". National Heritage List for England.
- Historic England. "Bellevue (1129486)". National Heritage List for England.

== Bibliography ==
- "The great flood of 1968". Memories of Bristol. Archived from the original on 2 May 2006.
- Map of Publow circa 1900
