= Church of All Saints, Publow =

Church in Somerset, England

Church of All Saints
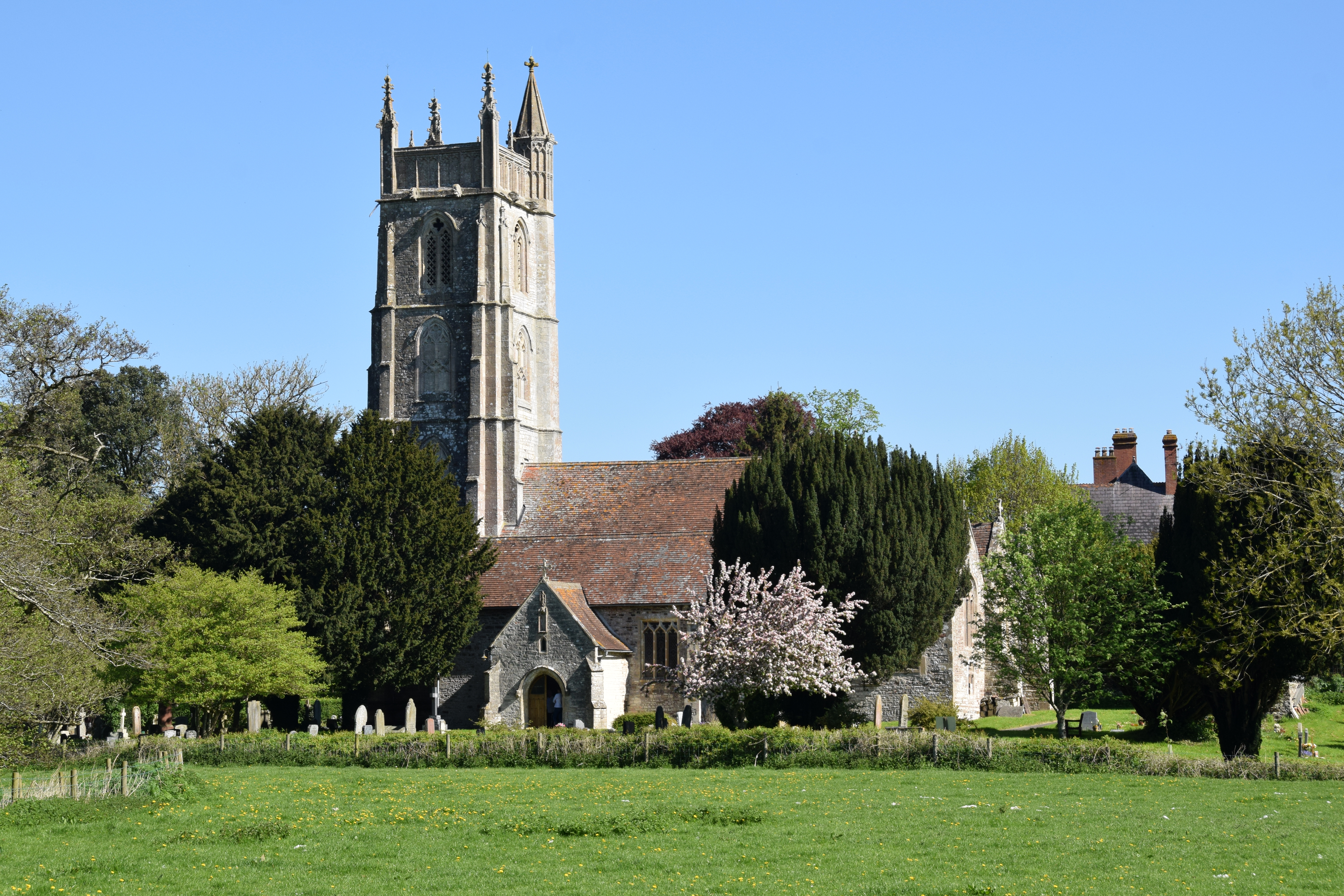

- Location within Somerset
- 51°22′34″N 2°32′32″W
- Location: Publow, Somerset, England

History
- Built: 14th century

Listed Building – Grade I
- Official name: Church of All Saints
- Designated: 21 September 1960
- Reference no.: 1129484

The Church of All Saints in Publow, Somerset, England, dates from the 14th century, and has a 15th-century tower with gargoyles. The pulpit is Jacobean. It has been designated a Grade I listed building.

The church consists of a west tower, nave, north aisle and porch, south aisle and porch, and chancel. The west tower, which was built around 1467, has four stages with set-back buttresses terminating in diagonally set pinnacles at the bell chamber stage. One of the bells is engraved with the arms of Sir Francis Popham.

The nave has a clerestory of four 2-light trefoil-headed windows. The east end of the chancel has an early Perpendicular (restored) 3-light window with reticulated tracery. The pulpit dates from the early 17th century and is made of oak with carved, arcaded panels to the upper part and rosettes on the lower part.

Major reconstruction was undertaken around the 1890s to plans developed by Arthur Blomfield at a cost of £1,400.

The register dates from 1569.

== See also ==
- List of Grade I listed buildings in Bath and North East Somerset
- List of towers in Somerset
- List of ecclesiastical parishes in the Diocese of Bath and Wells
