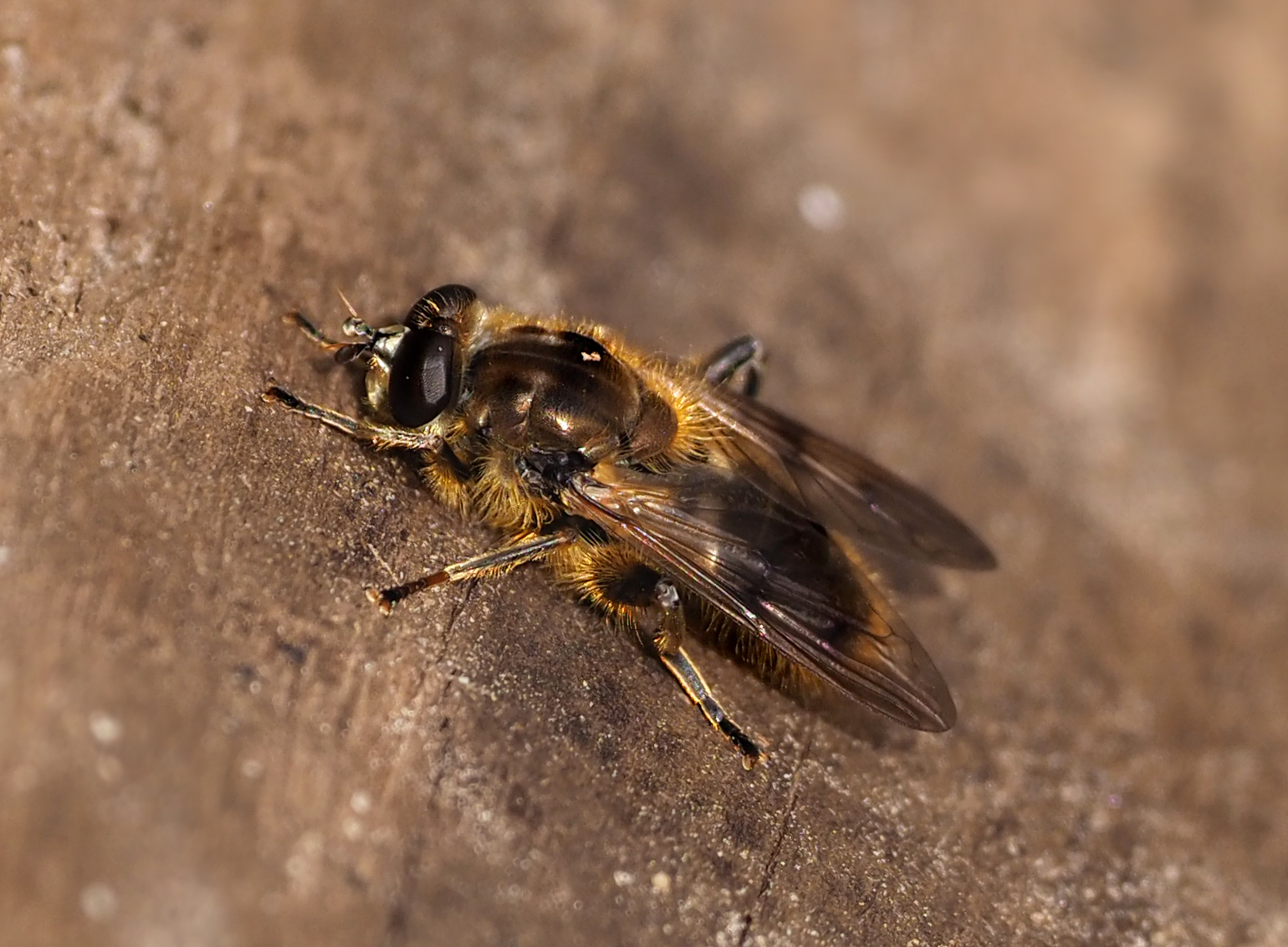
- Male specimen of Chalcosyrphus eunotus

Conservation status
- Vulnerable (IUCN 3.1)

Scientific classification
- Kingdom: Animalia
- Phylum: Arthropoda
- Clade: Pancrustacea
- Class: Insecta
- Order: Diptera
- Family: Syrphidae
- Subfamily: Eristalinae
- Tribe: Milesiini
- Subtribe: Xylotina
- Genus: Chalcosyrphus
- Subgenus: Xylotodes
- Species: C. eunotus

Binomial name
- Chalcosyrphus eunotus (Loew, 1873)

Synonyms
- Brachypalpus eunotus Loew, 1873

= Chalcosyrphus eunotus =

Species of fly

Chalcosyrphus eunotus, the logjammer hoverfly, is a species of hoverfly in the family Syrphidae. This hoverfly is found in deciduous and mixed forests close to running water in Europe and Western Asia.

== Taxonomy ==
Chalcosyrphus eunotus was first formally described as Brachypalpus eunotus in 1873 by the German entomologist Hermann Loew. In 1978 the Finnish dipterist Heiki Hippa moved this taxon from the genus Brachypalpus to the genus Chalcosyrphus. The genus Chalcosyrphus is classified within the subtribe Xylotina in the tribe Milesiini of the subfamily Eristalinae of the family Syrphidae.

== Distribution ==
Chalcosyrphus eunotus is found in Europe and Western Asia and has a scattered distribution from Great Britain through western and central Europe south to northern Spain and east to Turkey and the Caucasus.

== Habitat ==
Chalcosyrphus eunotus is a saproxylic species which is able to tolerate a very restricted range of ecological conditions. It is only found in areas of streams which have not been artificially altered. The larvae are found in decaying wood that has fallen into the water. The adults have been found along stream edges in mixed forest of oak, elm and ash, often settling on semi-submerged logs.

== Biology ==
Chalcosyrphus eunotus is a rather secretive species with the adults being very infrequently observed during their April to July flight period. They are closely associated with flowing water, typically small streams or brooks. In these habitats they are typically seen resting on fallen branches, or branches that are partially submerged or on stones partially in the water or on the leaves of large leafed emergent vegetation. The males patrol the stream, settling at resting places, repeatedly stopping at them. The male pursues passing females, after seeing them from a lookout position. They copulate on the wing. The female then ovipositions on or in the cracks and crannies in the bark of small alder and birch logs which are partially shaded as well as being partially submerged, on the edge of a small stream within riverine woodland. The eggs take between 2 and 4 weeks to hatch. After they emerge the larvae go into the wood of the log, instead of staying just below the bark. Here the larvae tunnel through the wood, with two or three larvae sharing the same tunnel.
