= Godfrey Louis =

Indian physicist

Godfrey Louis is a solid-state physicist from India. His hypotheses about the "red rain" phenomenon in Kerala have attracted controversy. In April 2008, he published a paper in which he hypothesised that samples of particles from the "blood-coloured" rain that fell in Kerala, India in the summer of 2001 were the result of a comet disintegrating in the upper atmosphere which comprised mainly microbes from outer space. The paper drew much media interest. Other scientists disagreed early on with Louis' hypothesis regarding the red rain's origin. An earlier (2001) study by the Centre for Earth Science Studies, Kerala, India, reported that the red rain was the result of spores from local algae.

Since October 2006 Louis has been at Department of Physics, Cochin University of Science and Technology (CUSAT) in Kochi, Kerala.

In August 2010 Louis and his collaborators presented a paper at the SPIE astrobiology conference held in San Diego, California, claiming that the red rain cells develop internal daughter cells and multiply when exposed to extreme temperature of 121 °C in an autoclave for two hours, and that the fluorescent behavior of the red cells is similar to the extended red emission observed in the Red Rectangle Nebula.

== See also ==
- Red rain in Kerala
- Panspermia
- Milton Wainwright
- Chandra Wickramasinghe
