= July 1968 United Kingdom thunderstorms =

Weather event in the British Isles

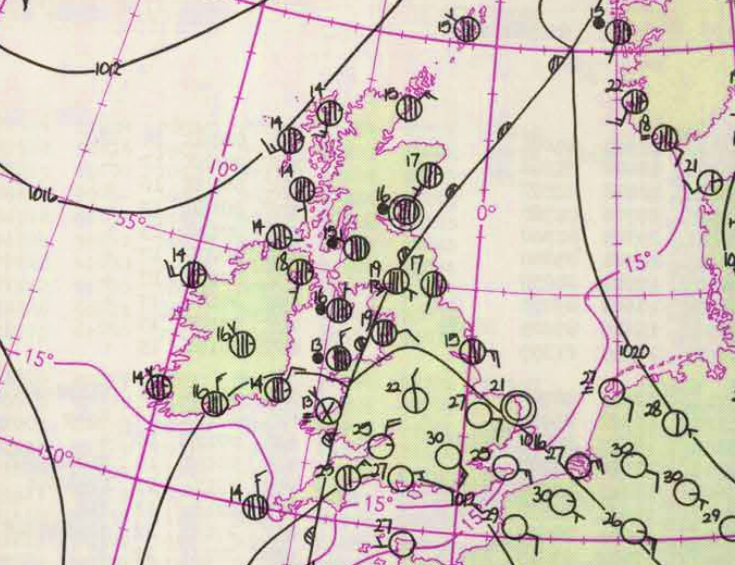
- Weather map at 18:00 on 1 July 1968

Meteorological history
- Formed: 1 July 1968
- Dissipated: 2 July 1968

Dust fall
- Largest hail: 75 millimetres (3.0 in); Cardiff
- Maximum rainfall: 184 millimetres (7.2 in); Isle of Man
- Maximum snowfall or ice accretion: 450 millimetres (18 in); Yeadon, West Yorkshire

Overall effects
- Fatalities: 4
- Damage: Widespread
- Areas affected: South West England, Welsh Marches, Northern England

The July 1968 United Kingdom thunderstorms were the most severe dust fall thunderstorms in the British Isles for over 200 years. A layer of mineral dust blowing north from the Sahara met cold, wet air over the British Isles, resulting in thick, dense clouds and severe thunderstorms across most of England and Wales. These clouds completely blotted out the light in some areas and the rain and hail resulted in property damage and flooding, and at least four people were killed. During the storm, Leeming Bar in North Yorkshire saw 35.7 millimetres (1.41 in) of rain in under 10 minutes – a UK record until 2003.

== Meteorology ==
The Hoggar Mountains in Algeria saw a number of severe thunderstorms on 26–27 June. These appear to have blown a large quantity of Sahara dust into the atmosphere, where it was caught in a southerly wind in an atmospheric layer between 10,000 feet (3,000 m) and 17,000 feet (5,200 m) in altitude, forming a classic Spanish plume. Unusually, no clouds formed as this dust blew over continental Europe, and the layer reached England on 30 June largely unrained out.

The warm desert air brought a heatwave over Southern England, with temperatures in London on 1 July measured at 32 °C (90 °F), until it met the much cooler, moister Atlantic airstream. The boundary between the two formed a squall line stretching from Devon, along the England–Wales border and up across Northern England to the River Tees. Thick clouds, darkened by the Sahara dust, rose to 44,000 feet (13,000 m), plunging areas along the squall line into total darkness. In some areas, the lightning continued for 24 hours, and ball lightning was seen at RAF Chivenor in Devon.

The dust particles served as seeds for nucleation, causing water to rapidly precipitate out and form especially large raindrops and hailstones. The thunderstorms resulted in one of the most widespread intense hail falls ever recorded in the UK, with hail events in 9 separate places reported as "severe" (H3) or greater on the TORRO hail scale, and the strongest rated "destructive" (H6). Hailstones 75 millimetres (3.0 in) across – the size of a tennis ball – were measured at Cardiff Airport, and the local newspaper for Hartland, Devon, reported the finding of "a piece of ice 4 inches (100 mm) long".

Along with the hail came heavy rain, with the 9 minute 35.7 millimetres (1.41 in) fall at Leeming Bar setting a record for a sub-10-minute total. The Isle of Man measured 184 millimetres (7.2 in) of rain over the 48 hour time period associated with the storms. Areas south and east of the squall line saw less severe storms, but the rain that fell in the night of 1–2 July 1968 was rich in Saharan dust, turning it blood red and leaving dusty deposits on the surfaces it fell on – only the south coast and uplands of Wales avoided the red rain. The last comparable storm associated with Saharan dust was seen in October 1755.

== Aftermath ==
The storms resulted in at least four fatalities. Three people were struck by lightning – a 72-year-old woman in Northallerton, a 14-year-old girl in Oldham, and an unnamed woman in Hampsthwaite – while an 80-year-old man drowned in flooding in Welshpool. Hail broke windows and dented cars across a wide swathe of the country, and damage was reported at both Cardiff Airport and RAF Chivenor. At Yeadon, West Yorkshire, the accumulated hail piled 450 millimetres (18 in) deep, and in parts of Yorkshire the ice was so severe that roads had to be cleared with bulldozers.

Bradford saw severe flooding on 2 July, with many streets in the centre left underwater, as did the Isle of Man. The Met Office noted that many rivers across the West Country and the Midlands burst their banks, and said that every town and village in Devon was flooded, with damage to property and crops assessed as "a major disaster". The summer of 1968 would prove to be one of the worst ever recorded for flooding in the UK, with further storms causing the Chew Stoke flood of 1968 just a week later and the Great Flood of 1968 that September, and would not be equalled until the 2007 floods.

In the wake of the storm, a number of normally rare African and Southern European insects were reported across England, having been blown across with the Sahara dust.

== See also ==
- New England's Dark Day
- Red rain in Kerala
