= Spanish plume =

Weather pattern

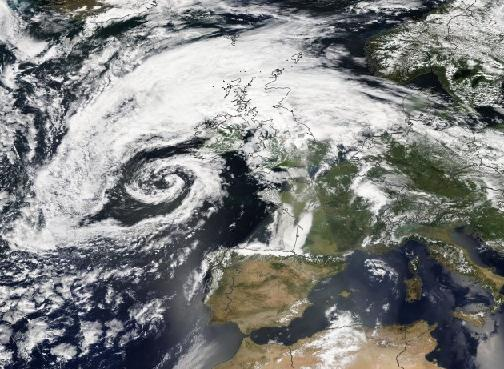
Satellite view 28 June 2012 showing low to west of Europe

The Spanish Plume (Penacho Ibérico in Spanish and Spaanse Pluim in Dutch) is a weather pattern in which a plume of warm air moves from the Iberian plateau or the Sahara to northwestern Europe, causing thunderstorms. This meteorological pattern can lead to extreme high temperatures and intense rainfall during the summer months, with potential for flash flooding, damaging hail, and tornado formation. Some of these intense thunderstorms are formed from thermal lows, which are also known as heat lows. Thermal lows can be semipermanent features around some parts of Europe, particularly in the summer season. These thermal lows can be developed or created around Spain, Portugal, France, etc., during the summer season because of the intense heat. Thermal low pressure can be located around the world, particularly in the summer or in tropical regions.

== Notable occurrences ==
- 1788, 13 July, a hailstorm sweeps across France and the Dutch Republic with hailstones 'as big as quart bottles' that take 'three days to melt'; immense damage is done.
- 1896, 10 September Paris Tornado.
- 1897, 24 July saw thunderstorms disrupt the celebrations of Queen Victoria's Diamond Jubilee.
- 1955, 18 July a Spanish Plume brought a record amount of rain on one day to Martinstown Dorset, with slow-moving thunderstorms bringing 279mm of rainfall. A record which stood for over 50 years until the 2009 Cumbria floods.
- 1958, 5 September Horsham storm, heaviest hailstone recorded in the UK (190g).
- 1959, 9 July Wokingham storm. the first in the world to be identified as a supercell.
- 1961, 12 August synoptic set-up of a Spanish Plume, however dry ground conditions in France led to little evaporation which led to lack of moisture in the air to fuel cloud and storm formation.
- 1968, 2 July July 1968 England and Wales dust fall storms – the plume had the highest mineral dust content recorded for over 200 years and caused major thunderstorms and rain dust across England.
- 1968, 10 July Chew Stoke flood of 1968 Chew Stoke floods and Pforzheim tornado in Germany.
- 1975, 14 July. Hailstorm in the Midlands.
- 1983, 25–26 July. Three Mesoscale Convective Systems over West France with Severe thunderstorm, heavy rain and Hailstorm
- 1985, 26 May East Anglia.

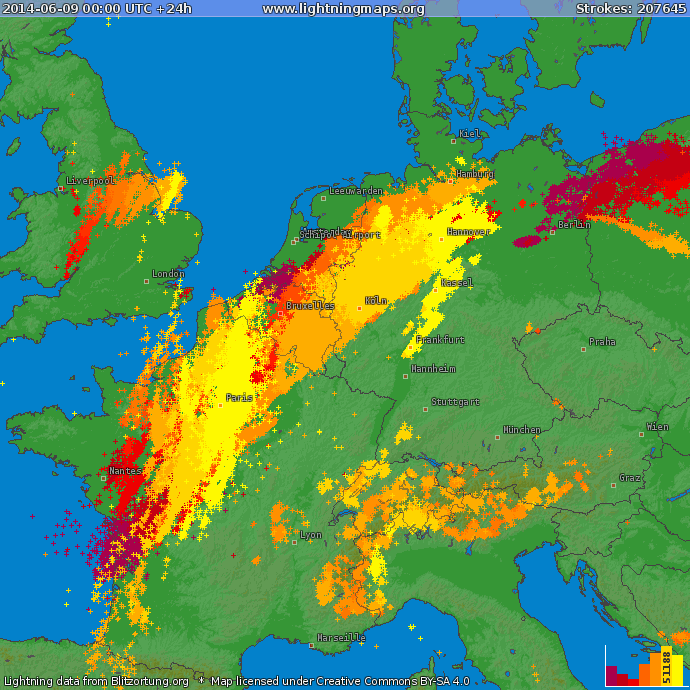
Lightning over western Europe 9 June 2014

- 1992, 20–21 July Severe thunderstorms over south-east England.
- 1994, 24 June, Severe storms move from northern France and across south-eastern England.
- 1995, 9 September A tornado was generated in the Rhine Valley, Germany.
- 1996, 7 June damaging hail storms across England from Lyme Bay to the Wash.
- 1997, 7 June A Bow echo formed over France before passing over Belgium and the Netherlands.
- 2003, 5–6 August
- 2004, 3–5 August severe thunderstorms affected London and South East England and caused a lightning strike on the track on the South West Main Line at Earlsfield which blew the signals out causing severe delays and later caused flooding near Wimbledon on the District Line on 4 August.
- 2011, 18 August a severe storm battered the Pukkelpop festival in Belgium. This situation shows some similarities with the Spanish Plume.
- 2012, 10 May high temperatures reported in south of England with a tornado in Belgium reaching 100 mph gusts in Ghent.
- 2012, 28 June supercells in UK and Belgium, disrupted the 2012 Summer Olympics torch relay and brought chaos to North East England.
- 2013, 26–27 July A Mesoscale convective system developed in France and moved across the Netherlands and northern Germany, a gust of 102 mph was recorded at Pauillac, France from the storm. Smaller scale thunderstorms developed in the UK.
- 2014, 7–11 June Pentecost weekend storms in Europe brought disruptive conditions across France, Belgium and Germany where 6 fatalities were recorded as a Bow Echo swept through North Rhine-Westphalia with winds up to 144 km/h.
- 2014, 17–21 July severe storms left at least two fatalities in France, with power cut to thousands of homes and localised flooding occurring in France and the United Kingdom.
- 2015, 30 June–4 July A plume brought high temperatures from Spain across France and the UK. In France some July temperature records were set, and in the UK some all time maxima were set in some locations. Severe thunderstorms also moved northwards across the UK on 1 July and again overnight 3–4 July.
- 2016, 6–7 June A Spanish plume event brought extensive thunderstorm activity across the UK and Ireland, resulting in the hospitalisation of a man and his children after being struck by lightning in Lisburn, Northern Ireland.

== Similar regional set-ups ==
=== Mexican Plume ===
A similar pattern, though on a larger scale, is the Mexican plume in the south west USA, where hot dry air from the Mexican highlands acts as a cap to convection until lifted over Texas, Arkansas and Oklahoma.

=== Eastern Baltic ===
In Finland and the Baltic states meteorologists have observed a situation conducive to severe summer storm development which occurs when a warm moist air mass flows into the region from the south or south east under the influence of an upper-level trough. These conditions have some similarities to the Spanish plume. The synoptic conditions see a low over southern Norway, bringing warm south and southwesterly flows of air up from the inner continental areas of Russia and Belarus.

== Animated descriptions of Spanish plume ==
- "What is a Spanish plume? - Met Office". www.metoffice.gov.uk.
- BBC Weather: Spanish Plume, what is it and how does it form with Darren Bett
- BBC Weather Player 'Spanish Plume' brings rain to the UK
