= 1968 Chew Stoke flood =

Severe weather event in England

Chew Stoke flood
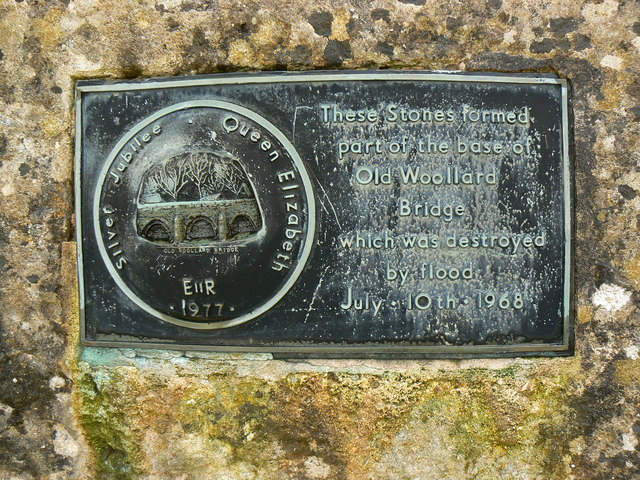
- Memorial to Old Woollard Bridge, destroyed by the flood.
- Date: 10 July 1968
- Location: Somerset, Bristol
- Deaths: 7–8

Chew Stoke Flood was a heavy rain event and severe flash flood which occurred on 10 July 1968, affecting Somerset and Southwest England in particular the Chew Valley and some areas of Bristol, notably Bedminster. The River Chew suffered a major flood in 1968 with serious damage to towns and villages along its route, including sweeping away the bridge at Pensford.

On 10 July 1968, torrential rainfall, with 175 millimetres (6.9 in) falling in 18 hours on Chew Stoke, double the area's average rainfall for the whole of July, led to widespread flooding in the Chew Valley, and water reached the first floor of many buildings. The damage in Chew Stoke was not as severe as in some of the surrounding villages, such as Pensford where it swept away the bridge over the A37 and damaged the railway viaduct so badly that it never reopened. It also flooded 88 properties in Chew Magna with many being inundated with 8 feet (2.4 m) of water. Fears that the Chew Valley Lake dam would be breached caused considerable anxiety.

On the southern side of the Mendip Hills at Cheddar the flow of water swept large boulders down the gorge and damaged the cafe and entrance to Gough's Cave, washing away cars. In the cave itself the flooding lasted for three days.

A Spanish plume weather pattern saw a low over the northwest of Spain track across the Bay of Biscay, hot and humid air advected to the eastern side of the low leading to severe storms. The wake of the storm left 7 fatalities in the United Kingdom.

== See also ==
- July 1968 England and Wales dust fall storms, severe storms just one week prior
- Great Flood of 1968, widespread and severe flooding in the Home counties of southern England during September 1968.
