= 2014 Pentecost weekend storms in Europe =

Weather event in Europe

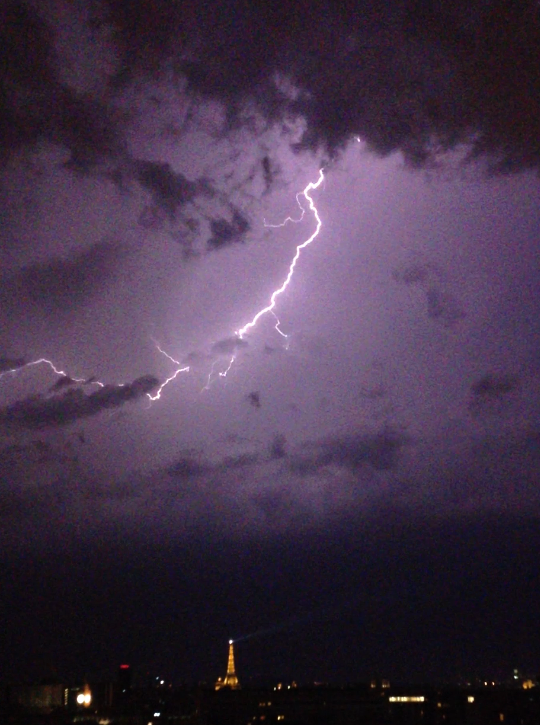
- Lightning above Paris on 9 June 2014 at 00h30

Meteorological history
- Formed: 6 June 2014
- Dissipated: 11 June 2014

Tornado outbreak
- Tornadoes: 4
- Max. rating: F2 tornado
- Highest gusts: 144 km/h (89 mph) in Düsseldorf, Germany.
- Largest hail: 11 cm (4.3 in)

Overall effects
- Fatalities: 6 (in Germany)
- Areas affected: Western and Central Europe

The 2014 Pentecost weekend storms in Europe were a series of intense supercells and MCSs affecting western and central Europe, which followed a heatwave in early June 2014, resulting from a Spanish plume synoptic weather pattern. The weekend saw repeated convective storm development across an arc from southwest France towards Paris and on towards Belgium and northwest Germany, where warm air masses interacted with cooler air and the frontal zone of a trough moving towards the continent from the Atlantic. Outbreaks of severe weather associated with this system spanned over 5 days from June 6 to June 11, with the worst damage occurring in the German state of North Rhine-Westphalia on 9 June, where the storm was described as one of the most violent in decades by the German Weather Service (Deutscher Wetterdienst). The responsible low pressure system is also referred to as storm "Ela" in some German media.

== Synoptic situation ==
On June 4, a small low pressure system formed just south of Greenland and raced southeast the following day. It deepened and expanded into a large trough and became almost stationary just off the coast of western Europe, roughly at the same latitude as France. Between the trough and a high pressure system over central Europe, a hot and moist airmass originating from northern Africa and the Mediterranean Sea made its way into western Europe. These synoptic conditions are also referred to as a Spanish plume or as described in German as an "antizyklonale Südlage" (by the Free University of Berlin). This airmass from the Mediterranean as well as Morocco and Sahara, saw temperatures reach up to 38 °C and cause very high instability with Mixed Layer CAPE values exceeding 3000 J/kg. A strong jet over western Europe had also developed along the southeastern flank of the trough, creating strong windshear necessary for organization of thunderstorms into supercells and squall-lines. The broad nature of the trough with multiple centres and a wave pattern along the edges, as well as thermic surface lows caused areas of convergence which penetrated the already unstable atmosphere and enabled the formation of multiple rounds of severe thunderstorms.

Only on June 10 and 11, the area of low pressure began moving again in a northeastward direction, before completely dissipating early on June 12.

=== Heatwave ===
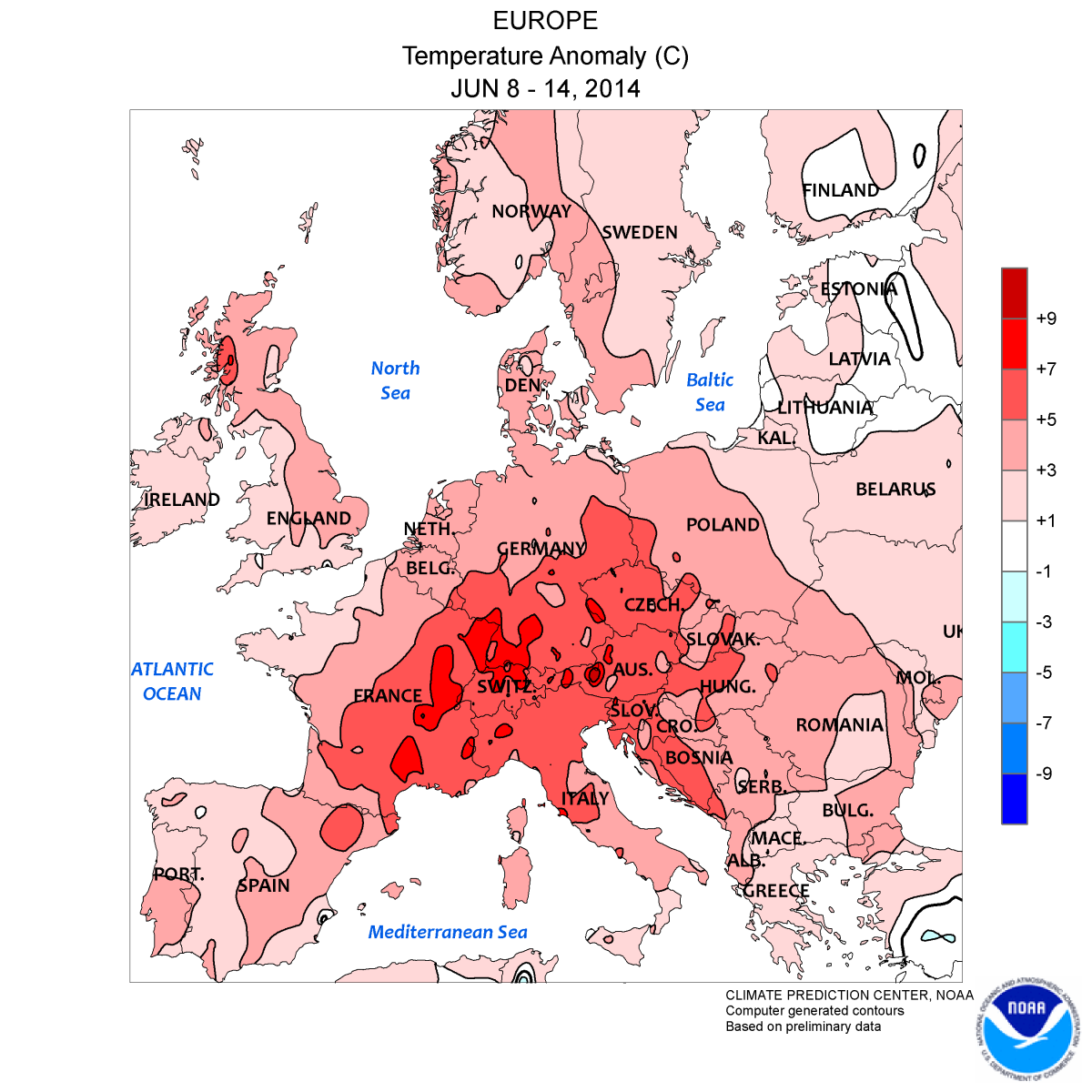
Europe temperature anomaly June 8–14, 2014

Over the weekend before Pentecost temperatures reached a new level for the first ten days of June and monthly records were broken in some areas of eastern France and southwestern Germany.

==== France ====
Across France the temperature widely exceeded 30 °C, reaching over 35 °C in the areas of the Massif Central and the south and east of the country. The warmest regions were predicted to occur in the area from Lyon to Alsace. With the French regions from the Pyrenees to the Paris Basin and on to Belgium seeing high temperatures, while warm air moved into the east of France and into Germany from the south. Marisol Touraine, the French Minister of Social Affairs and Health activated the public information system in response to the heatwave.

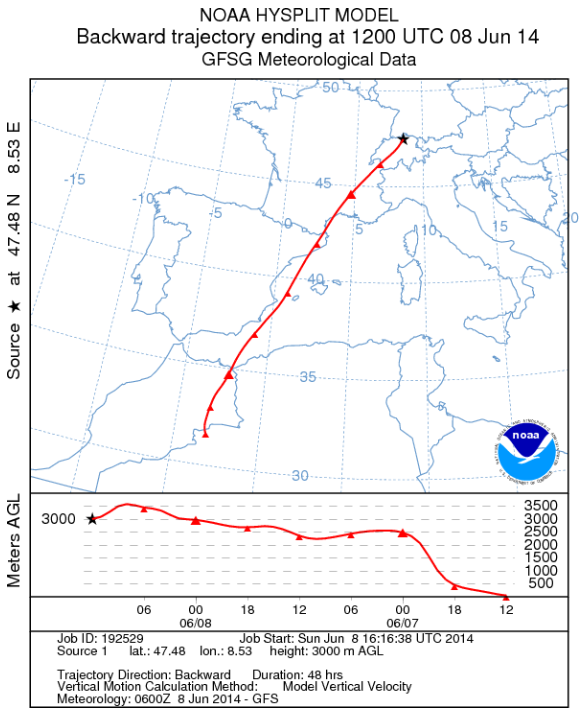
NOAA 48-hour airmass trajectory for Zurich 8 June 12.00 UTC at 3000 meters.

==== Switzerland ====
Switzerland saw high temperatures though not extreme or record breaking, temperatures were 30-34 °C in the Rhine valley and Valais. Pilatus mountain above Lucerne witnessed a concentration in Saharan dust carried over in the air mass. 9 June equalled the maximum recorded temperature in Sion at 36.2 °C, the Swiss lowlands saw a high temperature of 35.5 °C recorded in Basel.

==== Germany ====
The warm airmass approached Germany from south-east along the Rhône valley and through the Belfort Gap, first in to the Upper Rhine Graben which saw especially warm temperatures. Another area of heat was focused in the Lower Franconian "heat island", where also temperatures of more than 37 degrees Celsius were measured.

== Severe weather ==
Confirmed tornadoes by Fujita rating
FU	F0	F1	F2	F3	F4	F5	Total
0	0	3	1	0	0	0	4

June 6

First severe activity started in southwestern France on June 6, where some straight-line wind damage occurred in association with thunderstorms.

June 7

June 7 also remained relatively quiet except for a few storms in Belgium and in France which produced hail and once again damaging winds. A weak thunderstorm also produced a damaging F1 tornado in Ribeira, Spain.

June 8

Storm activity ramped up significantly on June 8, when multiple strong supercells developed over northern France, Belgium and Germany. Severe winds and damaging hail occurred in these storms; hailstones up to 7.5 cm fell in Lokeren, Belgium, and another supercell produced 9 cm hail north of Paris. A wind gust of 105 km/h (65 mph) was measured in Magnanville.

June 9

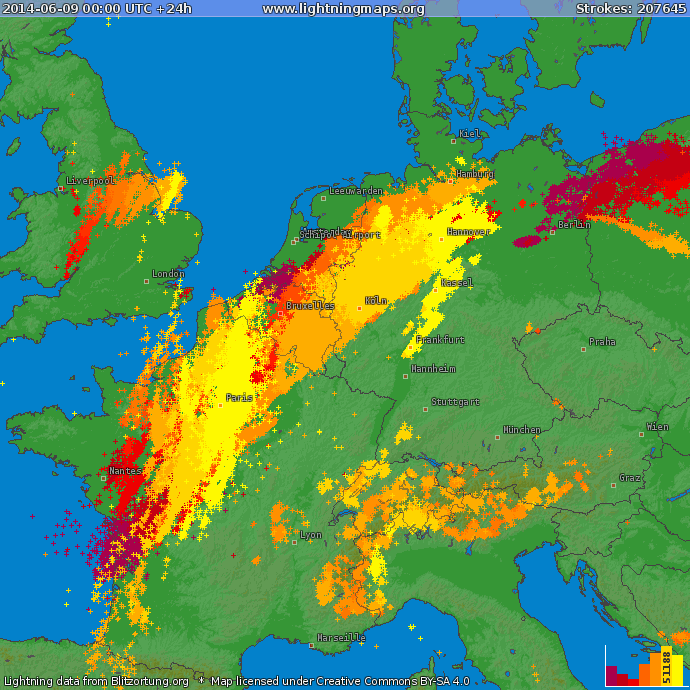
Lightning over western Europe 9 June 2014

June 9 saw the highest activity of the entire outbreak. The supercells over northern France from the previous day moved into the BeNeLux states during the overnight hours, continuing to produce large hail and strong winds. In Zeeland, Netherlands a 83 km/h (51 mph) gust was measured at the Tholen measuring station. They would eventually reach northwestern Germany in the early morning, and merge into an MCS.

Meanwhile, new storms had fired over northern France and quickly grew upscale into a second MCS. By 8 am, two large clusters were active, one in northern France and one in northern Germany, however, these systems would begin to weaken from that point in time, while moving northeast. New thunderstorms were already in progress directly behind the northern France MCS, some of which developed into discrete, intense supercells. One supercell in particular would pass directly over Paris while producing very large hail up to 10 cm in diameter, causing significant damage in the city. By 1 pm, the northern France MCS had already reached the Netherlands, and its outflow boundary caused new hail-producing supercells to form in Northrhine-Westfalia. The MCS restrengthened again as well, causing severe winds, mainly in the Netherlands.

As time approached evening, the former discrete supercells over France had reached Belgium, where they grew upscale into a strong line of severe thunderstorms roughly 170 km (105 mi) long. This MCS crossed the border into western Germany at around 8 pm and began to develop a large bowing segment. By 9 pm, the MCS had developed into a violent bow echo and moved across the Rhine-Ruhr metropolitan region with hurricane-force winds affecting roughly 10 million people. Large scale chaos and damage was the result, and the storm was later determined to be the most damaging weather event in this area in decades. All 6 fatalities from this outbreak were a result of the intense bow echo, and the cost of damage was estimated at 650 million euros, just from this single event. Peak winds of 144 km/h (89 mph) were measured in Düsseldorf at the airport, however based on the extent of damage, it is believed that windspeeds may have reached around 150 km/h (93 mph). The city of Neuss saw a top windspeed of 133 km/h (83 mph) and in the Ruhr city of Castrop-Rauxel a wind of 124 km/h (77 mph) was reported during the passage of the storm. In the area around 40 liters of rainfall per square meter fell.

Meanwhile, new severe thunderstorms, some of them supercells, had developed again in the western half of France, producing intense winds and very large hail. The town of Ardon was hit by a supercell at around 9:30 pm, which produced hail up to 11 cm in diameter. A 130 km/h (81 mph) windgust was recorded in Cognac, Charente. This was the fourth highest gust since 1981 and the highest since the passage of Cyclone Lothar and Martin in December 1999, when a 158 km/h (98 mph) gust was measured. At Melle, Deux-Sèvres in western France, winds up to 120 km/h (75 mph) were recorded, which is the second highest gust recorded since the opening of the station, after that observed during the passage of Cyclone Lothar and Martin in December 1999.

In Germany, the bow echo began to weaken drastically after 11 pm as it moved east into central Germany. However it would continue to produce strong and partly severe winds until crossing the border into Poland the following morning, where it finally dissipated.

June 10

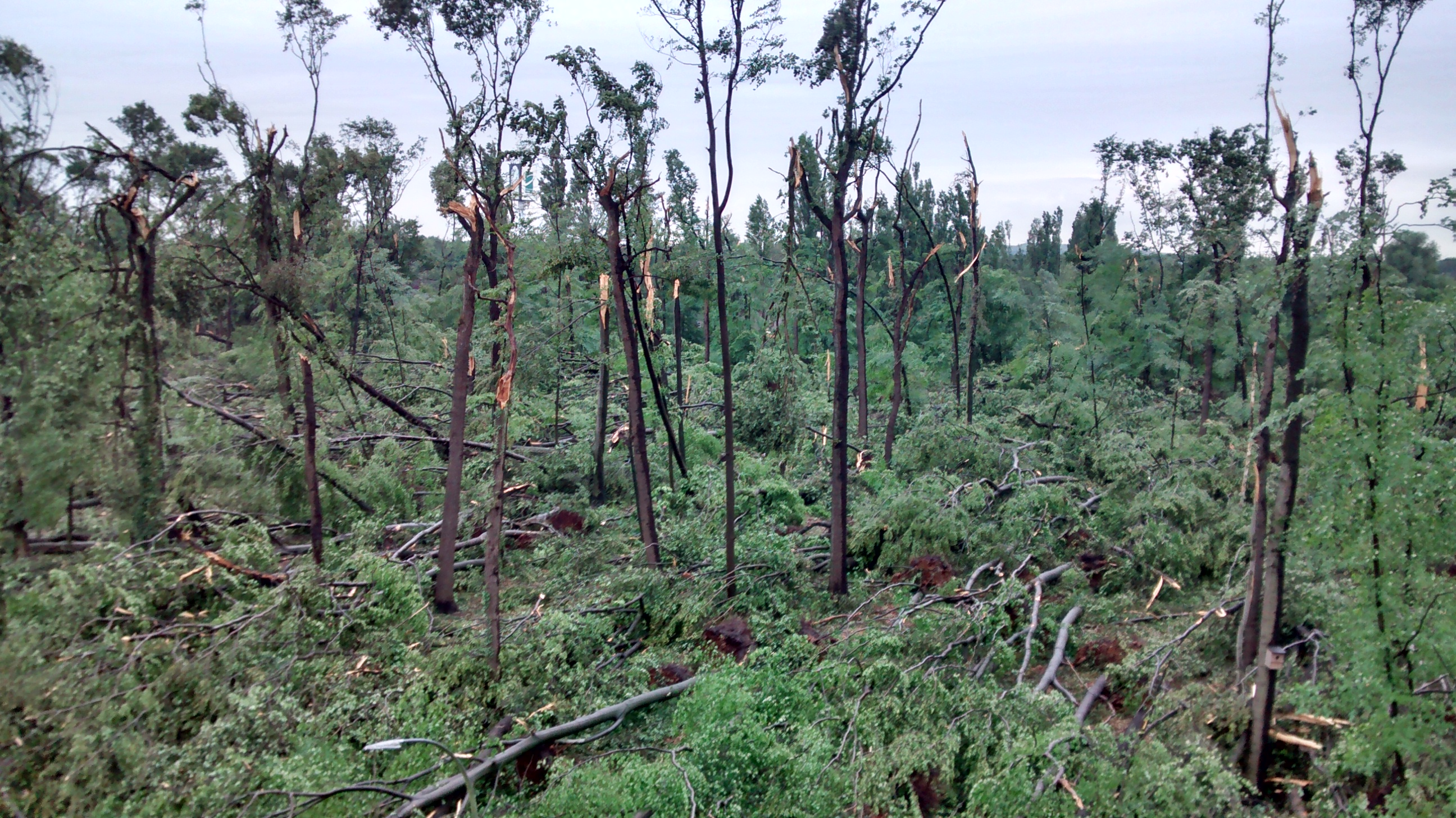
Damage to a forest in Recklinghausen, Germany, after the intense bow echo

Upon reaching the Paris area around midnight, the supercells from the previous evening merged into an MCS once again. While being significantly weaker, this system would produce some more damage as it moved over the previous bow echo's path, before dissipating in northern Germany at around 9 am.

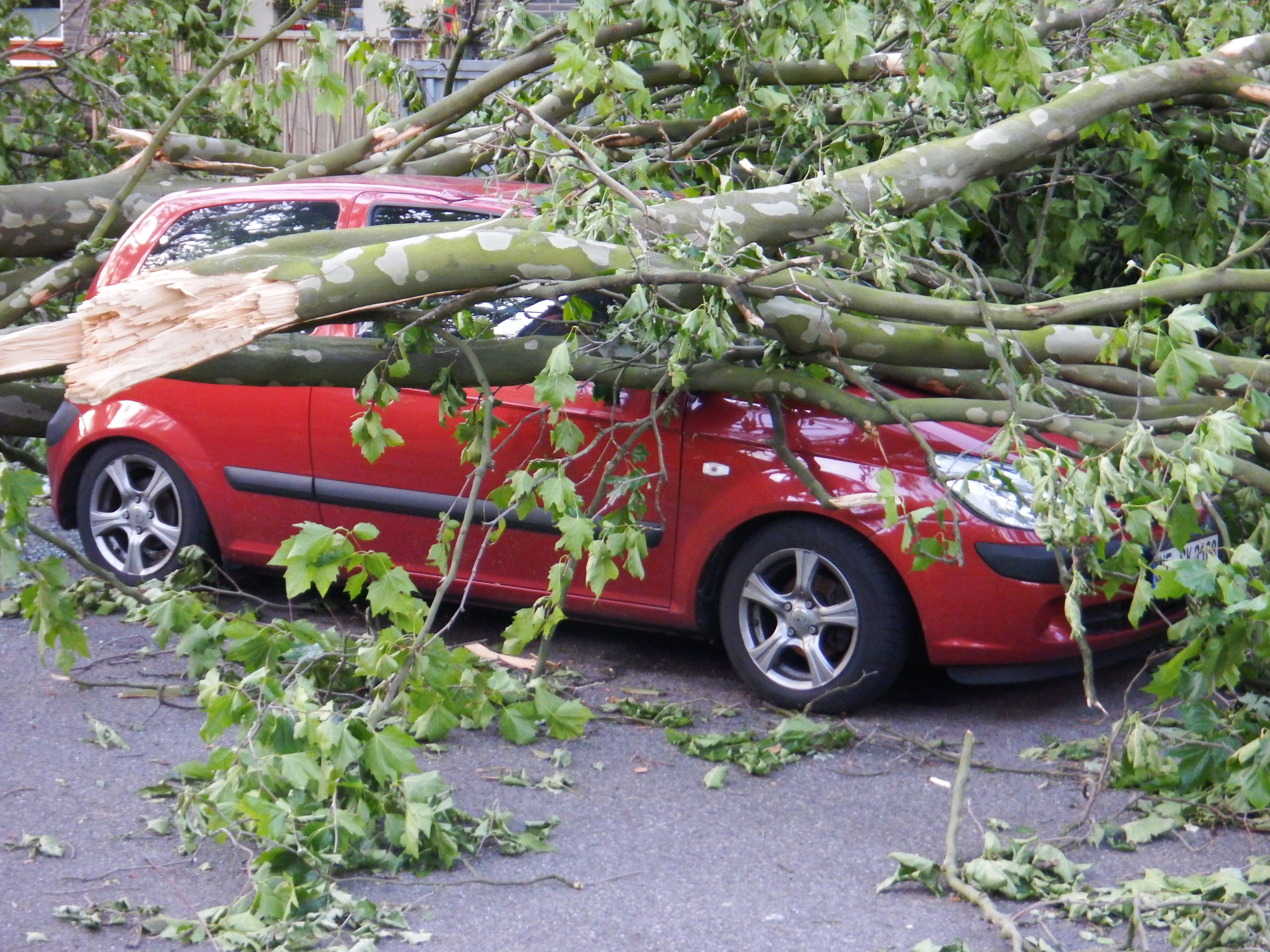
A large branch fell onto a car in Neuss, Germany

The trough responsible for the outbreak was forced to move northward on June 10 due to a new low pressure system pushing in from the Atlantic. By 5 pm, the centre was located over the northern British Isles, while its frontal zone had advanced eastward. As a result, the jet with the strongest windshear was no longer overlapping with the highest instability, and the environment was overall less favourable for severe weather compared to the previous two days. The risk area had also shifted eastward and now stretched from eastern France into southern and central Germany. Still, severe thunderstorms and supercells developed. 5 cm hail was recorded near Kassel, and a 90 km/h (56 mph) wind gust was measured in Chargey-lès-Gray.

June 11

On June 11, Iberia and the western half of France came under the influence of a new high pressure system. Meanwhile, the frontal zone of the trough had almost reached the Alps, effectively cutting off the flow of hot and moist air into western and central Europe. Still, a large pocket of instability remained over eastern Germany, western Poland and parts of Czechia, where thunderstorm activity would focus on the last day of the outbreak. Thunderstorms from the previous day in France had moved into central Germany after weakening overnight, but were able to gradually restrengthen again after sunrise. They grew upscale into an MCS around noon and reached northeastern Germany. A strong vortex embedded in this MCS spawned at least three tornadoes in southern Mecklenburg-Vorpommern, with the first one touching down at 1:37 pm. This tornado received an F1 rating after causing significant vegetation damage in a forest along a 2.2 km long path. At 1:40 pm, a second tornado touched down just to the north of the first tornado, and devastated a forest along a 3.7 km long track. This tornado was given an F2 rating. It is believed that both tornadoes coexisted for some time while being less than 2 km away from each other. The third tornado occurred at 1:58 pm and hit the village of Blumenhagen, damaging roofs and snapping trees. A pavilion was reportedly lifted 150 m into the air and thrown. The maximum damage along the 2.1 km long path was determined to be F1. The storm cluster also produced large hail and severe winds, before moving off into Poland and dissipating later that evening. A windspeed of 113 km/h (70 mph) was recorded in Kyritz, Brandenburg, and 6 cm large hail was observed in Kodersdorf, Saxony.

Between Saturday 7 and Tuesday 10 June morning, there fell in total 55mm of rain Saint-Sauveur-Marville Marville (Eure-et-Loir), which corresponds to 5–6 weeks worth of rainfall during an average June in Paris.

The total number of lightning discharges on 9 June was more than 64,000 in the Netherlands, such a number is on average only seen once per summer season. The bow echo produced an estimated 113,708 lightning strikes across Germany between 2pm 9 June and 8am 10 June.

== See also ==
- Birlikte - Zusammenstehen
