= Red rain in Kerala =

Episodes of rain containing vast amounts of red algal spores in India

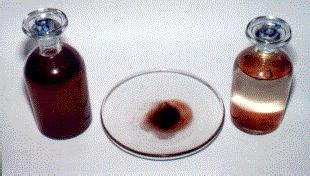
Rain water sample (left) and after the particles settled (right). Dried sediment (centre)

The Kerala red rain phenomenon was a blood rain event that occurred in Wayanad district of the southern Indian state Kerala on Monday, 15 July 1957, and also from 25 July to 23 September 2001, when heavy downpours of red-coloured rain fell sporadically in Kerala, staining clothes pink. Yellow, green and black rain was also reported. Coloured rain was also reported in Kerala in 1896 and several times since, most recently in June 2012, and from 15 November 2012 to 27 December 2012 in eastern and north-central provinces of Sri Lanka.

Following a light-microscopy examination in 2001, it was initially thought that the rains were coloured by fallout from a hypothetical meteor burst, but a study commissioned by the Government of India concluded that the rains had been coloured by airborne spores from a locally prolific terrestrial green algae from the genus Trentepohlia.

== Occurrence ==
Kottayam district in Kerala, which experienced the most red rainfall

The coloured rain of Kerala began falling on 25 July 2001, in the districts of Kottayam and Idukki in the southern part of the state. Yellow, green, and black rain was also reported. Many more occurrences of the red rain were reported over the following ten days, and then with diminishing frequency until late September. According to locals, the first coloured rain was preceded by a loud thunderclap and flash of light, and followed by groves of trees shedding shrivelled grey "burnt" leaves. Shriveled leaves and the disappearance and sudden formation of wells were also reported around the same time in the area. It typically fell over small areas, no more than a few square kilometres in size, and was sometimes so localised that normal rain could be falling just a few meters away from the red rain. Red rainfalls typically lasted less than 20 minutes. Each millilitre of rain water contained about 9 million red particles. Extrapolating these figures to the total amount of red rain estimated to have fallen, it was estimated that 50,000 kilograms (110,000 lb) of red particles had fallen on Kerala.

== Description of the particles ==
The brownish-red solid separated from the red rain consisted of about 90% round red particles and the balance consisted of debris. The particles in suspension in the rain water were responsible for the colour of the rain, which at times was strongly coloured red. A small percentage of particles were white or had light yellow, bluish grey and green tints. The particles were typically 4 to 10 μm across and spherical or oval. Electron microscope images showed the particles as having a depressed centre. At still higher magnification some particles showed internal structures.

== Chemical composition ==
Elemental analysis
	Analysis by the CESS (%)	Analysis by Louis & Kumar (%)
Al	1.0	0.41
Ca	2.52	
C	51.00	49.53
Cl		0.12
H		4.43
Fe	0.61	0.97
Mg	1.48	
N		1.84
O		45.42
K	0.26	
P	0.08	
Si	7.50	2.85
Na	0.49	0.69

Photomicrograph of particles from red rain sample

Some water samples were taken to the Centre for Earth Science Studies (CESS) in India, where they separated the suspended particles by filtration. The pH of the water was found to be around 7 (neutral). The electrical conductivity of the rainwater showed the absence of any dissolved salts. Sediment (red particles plus debris) was collected and analysed by the CESS using a combination of ion-coupled plasma mass spectrometry, atomic absorption spectrometry and wet chemical methods. The major elements found are listed below. The CESS analysis also showed significant amounts of heavy metals, including nickel (43 ppm), manganese (59 ppm), titanium (321 ppm), chromium (67ppm) and copper (55 ppm).

Physicists Godfrey Louis and Santhosh Kumar of the Mahatma Gandhi University, Kerala, used energy dispersive X-ray spectroscopy analysis of the red solid and showed that the particles were composed of mostly carbon and oxygen, with trace amounts of silicon and iron. A CHN analyser showed content of 43.03% carbon, 4.43% hydrogen, and 1.84% nitrogen.

Tom Brenna in the Division of Nutritional Sciences at Cornell University conducted carbon and nitrogen isotope analyses using a scanning electron microscope with X-ray micro-analysis, an elemental analyser, and an isotope ratio (IR) mass spectrometer. The red particles collapsed when dried, which suggested that they were filled with fluid. The amino acids in the particles were analysed and seven were identified (in order of concentration): phenylalanine, glutamic acid/glutamine, serine, aspartic acid, threonine, and arginine. The results were consistent with a marine origin or a terrestrial plant that uses a C4 photosynthetic pathway.

== Government report ==
A single spore viewed with a transmission electron microscope, purportedly showing a detached inner capsule.

Initially, the Centre for Earth Science Studies (CESS) stated that the likely cause of the red rain was an exploding meteor, which had dispersed about 1,000 kg (one ton) of material. A few days later, following a basic light microscopy evaluation, the CESS retracted this as they noticed the particles resembled spores, and because debris from a meteor would not have continued to fall from the stratosphere onto the same area while unaffected by wind. A sample was, therefore, handed over to the Tropical Botanical Garden and Research Institute (TBGRI) for microbiological studies, where the spores were allowed to grow in a medium suitable for growth of algae and fungi. The inoculated petri dishes and conical flasks were incubated for three to seven days and the cultures were observed under a microscope.

In November 2001, commissioned by the Government of India's Department of Science & Technology, the Centre for Earth Science Studies (CESS) and the Tropical Botanical Garden and Research Institute (TBGRI) issued a joint report, which concluded:

The colour was found to be due to the presence of a large amount of spores of a lichen-forming alga belonging to the genus Trentepohlia. Field verification showed that the region had plenty of such lichens. Samples of lichen taken from Changanacherry area, when cultured in an algal growth medium, also showed the presence of the same species of algae. Both samples (from rainwater and from trees) produced the same kind of algae, indicating that the spores seen in the rainwater most probably came from local sources

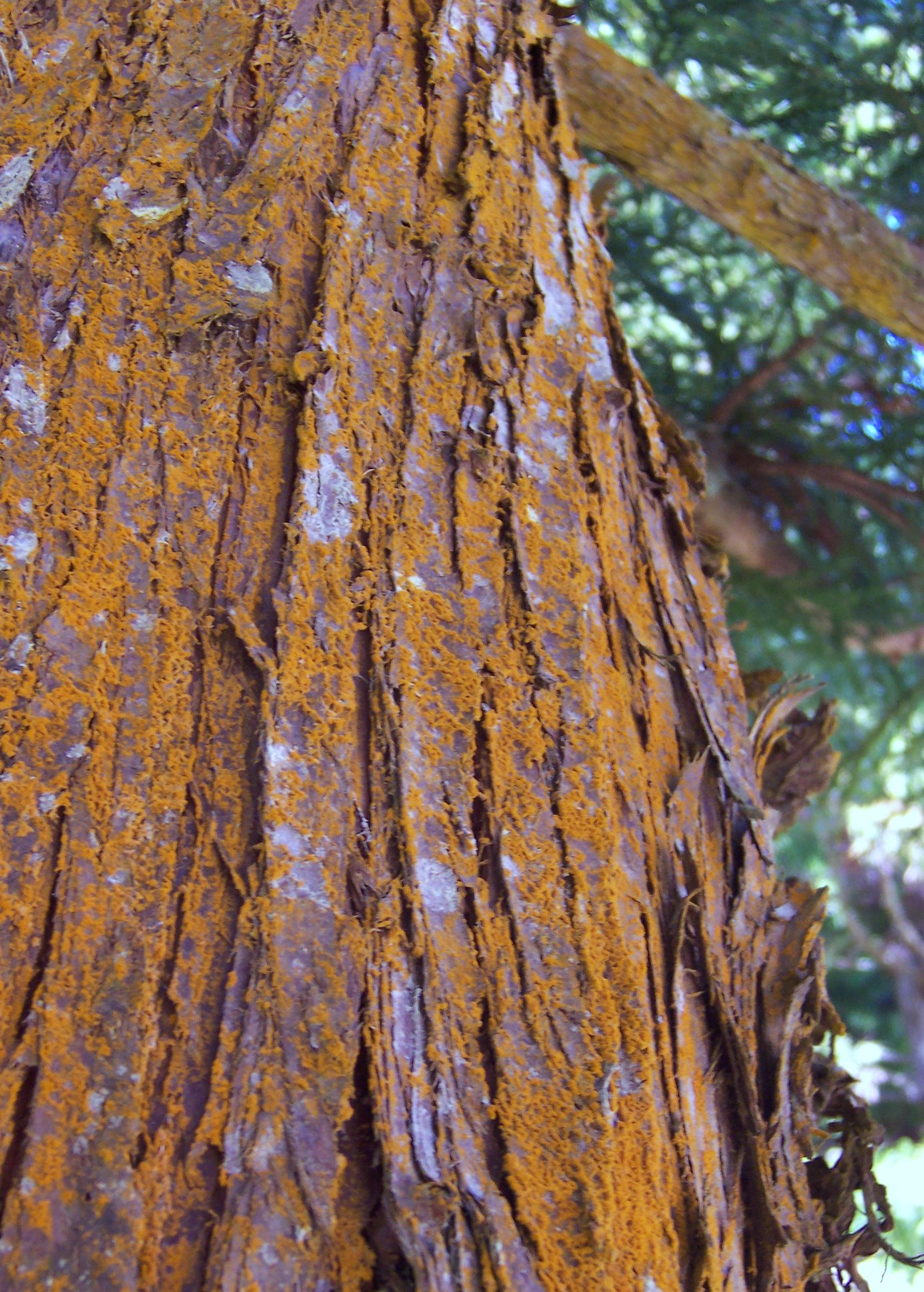
Trentepohlia on Cryptomeria japonica bark

The site was again visited on 16 August 2001 and it was found that almost all the trees, rocks and even lamp posts in the region were covered with Trentepohlia estimated to be in sufficient amounts to generate the quantity of spores seen in the rainwater. Although red or orange, Trentepohlia is a chlorophyte green alga which can grow abundantly on tree bark or damp soil and rocks, but is also the photosynthetic symbiont or photobiont of many lichens, including some of those abundant on the trees in Changanassery area. The strong orange colour of the algae, which masks the green of the chlorophyll, is caused by the presence of large quantities of orange carotenoid pigments. A lichen is not a single organism, but the result of a partnership (symbiosis) between a fungus and an alga or cyanobacterium.

The report also stated that there was no meteoric, volcanic or desert dust origin present in the rainwater and that its colour was not due to any dissolved gases or pollutants. The report concluded that heavy rains in Kerala – in the weeks preceding the red rains – could have caused the widespread growth of lichens, which had given rise to a large quantity of spores into the atmosphere. However, for these lichen to release their spores simultaneously, it is necessary for them to enter their reproductive phase at about the same time. The CESS report noted that while this may be a possibility, it is quite improbable. Also, they could find no satisfactory explanation for the apparently extraordinary dispersal, nor for the apparent uptake of the spores into clouds. CESS scientists noted that "While the cause of the colour in the rainfall has been identified, finding the answers to these questions is a challenge." Attempting to explain the unusual spore proliferation and dispersal, researcher Ian Goddard proposed several local atmospheric models.

Parts of the CESS/TBGRI report were supported by Milton Wainwright at the University of Sheffield, who, together with Chandra Wickramasinghe, has studied stratospheric spores. In March 2006 Wainwright said the particles were similar in appearance to spores of a rust fungus, later saying that he had confirmed the presence of DNA, and reported their similarity to algal spores, and found no evidence to suggest that the rain contained dust, sand, fat globules, or blood. In November 2012, Rajkumar Gangappa and Stuart Hogg from the University of Glamorgan, UK, confirmed that the red rain cells from Kerala contain DNA.

In February 2015, a team of scientists from India and Austria, also supported the identification of the algal spores as Trentepohlia annulata, however, they speculate that the spores from the 2011 incident were carried by winds from Europe to the Indian subcontinent.

== Alternative hypotheses ==
History records many instances of unusual objects falling with the rain – in 2000, in an example of raining animals, a small waterspout in the North Sea sucked up a school of fish a mile off shore, depositing them shortly afterwards on Great Yarmouth in the United Kingdom. Coloured rain is by no means rare, and can often be explained by the airborne transport of rain dust from deserts or other dry regions which have been washed down by rain. "Red Rains" have been frequently described in southern Europe, with increasing reports in recent years. One such case occurred in England in 1903, when dust was carried from the Sahara and fell with rain in February of that year.

At first, the red rain in Kerala was attributed to the same effect, with dust from the deserts of Arabia initially the suspect. LIDAR observations had detected a cloud of dust in the atmosphere near Kerala in the days preceding the outbreak of the red rain. However, laboratory tests from all involved teams ruled out the particles were desert sand.

K.K. Sasidharan Pillai, a senior scientific assistant in the Indian Meteorological Department, proposed dust and acidic material from an eruption of Mayon Volcano in the Philippines as an explanation for the coloured rain and the "burnt" leaves. The volcano was erupting in June and July 2001 and Pillai calculated that the Eastern or Equatorial jet stream could have transported volcanic material to Kerala in 25–36 hours. The Equatorial jet stream is unusual in that it sometimes flows from east to west at about 10° N, approximately the same latitude as Kerala (8° N) and Mayon Volcano (13° N). This hypothesis was also ruled out as the particles were neither acidic nor of volcanic origin, but were spores.

A study has been published showing a correlation between historic reports of coloured rains and of meteors; the author of the paper, Patrick McCafferty, stated that sixty of these colored rain events, or 36%, were linked to meteoritic or cometary activity, though not always strongly. Sometimes the fall of red rain seems to have occurred after an air-burst, as from a meteor exploding in air; other times the odd rainfall is merely recorded in the same year as the appearance of a comet.

=== Panspermia hypothesis ===
In 2003 Godfrey Louis and Santhosh Kumar, physicists at the Mahatma Gandhi University in Kottayam, Kerala, posted an article entitled "Cometary panspermia explains the red rain of Kerala" in the non-peer reviewed arXiv web site. While the CESS report said there was no apparent relationship between the loud sound (possibly a sonic boom) and flash of light which preceded the red rain, to Louis and Kumar it was a key piece of evidence. They proposed that a meteor (from a comet containing the red particles) caused the sound and flash and when it disintegrated over Kerala it released the red particles which slowly fell to the ground. However, they omitted an explanation on how debris from a meteor continued to fall in the same area over a period of two months while unaffected by winds.

Their work indicated that the particles were of biological origin (consistent with the CESS report), however, they invoked the panspermia hypothesis to explain the presence of cells in a supposed fall of meteoric material. Additionally, using ethidium bromide they were unable to detect DNA or RNA in the particles. Two months later they posted another paper on the same web site entitled "New biology of red rain extremophiles prove cometary panspermia" in which they reported that

The microorganism isolated from the red rain of Kerala shows very extraordinary characteristics, like the ability to grow optimally at 300 °C (572 °F) and the capacity to metabolise a wide range of organic and inorganic materials.

These claims and data have yet to be verified and reported in any peer reviewed publication. In 2006 Louis and Kumar published a paper in Astrophysics and Space Science entitled "The red rain phenomenon of Kerala and its possible extraterrestrial origin" which reiterated their arguments that the red rain was biological matter from an extraterrestrial source but made no mention of their previous claims to having induced the cells to grow. The team also observed the cells using phase contrast fluorescence microscopy, and they concluded that: "The fluorescence behaviour of the red cells is shown to be in remarkable correspondence with the extended red emission observed in the Red Rectangle Nebula and other galactic and extragalactic dust clouds, suggesting, though not proving an extraterrestrial origin." One of their conclusions was that if the red rain particles are biological cells and are of cometary origin, then this phenomenon can be a case of cometary panspermia.

In August 2008 Louis and Kumar again presented their case in an astrobiology conference. The abstract for their paper states that

The red cells found in the red rain in Kerala, India are now considered as a possible case of extraterrestrial life form. These cells can undergo rapid replication even at an extreme high temperature of 300 °C (572 °F). They can also be cultured in diverse unconventional chemical substrates. The molecular composition of these cells is yet to be identified.

In September 2010 a similar paper was presented at a conference in California, US.

==== Cosmic ancestry ====
Researcher Chandra Wickramasinghe used Louis and Kumar's "extraterrestrial origin" claim to further support his panspermia hypothesis called cosmic ancestry. This hypothesis postulates that life is neither the product of supernatural creation, nor is it spontaneously generated through abiogenesis, but that it has always existed in the universe. Cosmic ancestry speculates that higher life forms, including intelligent life, descend ultimately from pre-existing life which was at least as advanced as the descendants.

==== Criticism ====
Louis and Kumar made their first publication of their finding on a web site in 2003, and have presented papers at conferences and in astrophysics magazines a number of times since. The controversial conclusion of Louis et al. is the only hypothesis suggesting that these organisms are of extraterrestrial origin. Such reports have been popular in the media, with major news agencies like CNN repeating the panspermia theory without critique.

The hypothesis' authors – G. Louis and Kumar – did not explain how debris from a meteor could have continued to fall on the same area over a period of two months, despite the changes in climatic conditions and wind pattern spanning over two months. Samples of the red particles were also sent for analysis to his collaborators Milton Wainwright at the University of Sheffield and Chandra Wickramasinghe at Cardiff University. Louis then incorrectly reported on 29 August 2010 in the non-peer reviewed online physics archive "arxiv.org" that they were able to have these cells "reproduce" when incubated at high pressure saturated steam at 121 °C (autoclaved) for up to two hours. Their conclusion is that these cells reproduced, without DNA, at temperatures higher than any known life form on earth is able to. They claimed that the cells, however, were unable to reproduce at temperatures similar to known organisms.

Regarding the "absence" of DNA, Louis admits he has no training in biology, and has not reported the use of any standard microbiology growth medium to culture and induce germination and growth of the spores, basing his claim of "biological growth" on light absorption measurements following aggregation by supercritical fluids, an inert physical observation. Both his collaborators, Wickramasinghe and Milton Wainwright independently extracted and confirmed the presence of DNA from the spores. The absence of DNA was key to Louis and Kumar's hypothesis that the cells were of extraterrestrial origins.

Louis' only reported attempt to stain the spores' DNA was by the use of malachite green, which is generally used to stain bacterial endospores, not algal spores, whose primary function of their cell wall and their impermeability is to ensure its own survival through periods of environmental stress. They are therefore resistant to ultraviolet and gamma radiation, desiccation, lysozyme, temperature, starvation and chemical disinfectants. Visualizing algal spore DNA under a light microscope can be difficult due to the impermeability of the highly resistant spore wall to dyes and stains used in normal staining procedures. The spores' DNA is tightly packed, encapsulated and desiccated, therefore, the spores must first be cultured in suitable growth medium and temperature to first induce germination, then cell growth followed by reproduction before staining the DNA.

Other researchers have noted recurring instances of red rainfalls in 1818, 1846, 1872, 1880, 1896, and 1950 and several times since then. Most recently, coloured rainfall occurred over Kerala during the summers of 2001, 2006, 2007, 2008, and 2012; since 2001, the botanists have found the same Trentepohlia spores every time. This supports the notion that the red rain is a seasonal local environmental feature caused by algal spores.

== In popular culture ==
- The science fiction film Red Rain was loosely based on the red rain in Kerala story. It was directed by Rahul Sadasivan and released in India on 6 December 2013.

== See also ==
- 2015 Kerala meteorite – Meteor air burst over Kerala, India
- Panspermia – Hypothesis on the interstellar spreading of primordial life
- Yellow rain – Purported chemical weapon
