= Diseases from Space =

Book by Fred Hoyle

Diseases From Space
- Author: Chandra Wickramasinghe, Fred Hoyle
- Language: English
- Genre: Space medicine
- Published: 1979
- Publication place: United Kingdom
- ISBN: 978-0060119379
- LC Class: RC1137

Diseases from Space is a book published in 1979 that was authored by astronomers Fred Hoyle and Chandra Wickramasinghe, where they propose that many of the most common diseases which afflict humanity, such as influenza, the common cold and whooping cough, have their origins in extraterrestrial sources. The two authors argue the case for outer space being the main source for these pathogens or at least their causative agents.

The claim connecting terrestrial disease and extraterrestrial pathogens was rejected by the scientific community.

== Overview ==
Fred Hoyle and Chandra Wickramasinghe spent over 20 years investigating the nature and composition of interstellar dust. Though many hypotheses regarding this dust had been postulated by various astronomers since the middle of the 19th century, all were found to be wanting as and when new data on the gas and dust clouds became available. Chandra Wickramasinghe proposed the existence of polymeric composition based on the molecule formaldehyde (H_{2}CO).

In 1974 Wickramasinghe first proposed the hypothesis that some dust in interstellar space was largely organic (containing carbon and nitrogen), and followed this up with other research confirming the hypothesis. Wickramasinghe also proposed and confirmed the existence of polymeric compounds based on formaldehyde. Fred Hoyle and Wickramasinghe later proposed the identification of bicyclic aromatic compounds from an analysis of the ultraviolet extinction absorption at 2175A, thus demonstrating the existence of polycyclic aromatic hydrocarbon molecules in space.

Hoyle and Wickramasinghe went further and speculated that the overall spectroscopic data of cosmic dust and gas clouds also matched those for desiccated bacteria. This led them to conclude that diseases such as influenza and the common cold are incident from space and fall upon the Earth in what they term "pathogenic patches." Hoyle and Wickramasinghe viewed the process of evolution in a manner at variance with the standard Darwinian model. They speculated that genetic material in the form of incoming pathogens from the cosmos provided the mechanism for driving the evolutionary engine. Hoyle died in 2001, and Wickramasinghe still advocates for these views and beliefs.

== Scientific consensus ==
The claim connecting terrestrial disease and extraterrestrial pathogens was rejected and dismissed by the scientific community. On 24 May 2003 The Lancet journal published a letter from Wickramasinghe, jointly signed by Milton Wainwright and Jayant Narlikar, in which they speculate that the virus that causes severe acute respiratory syndrome (SARS) could be extraterrestrial in origin instead of originating from chickens. The Lancet subsequently published three responses to this letter, showing that the hypothesis was not evidence-based, and casting doubts on the quality of the experiments referenced by Wickramasinghe in his letter.

== Publication history ==
First published in 1979 by J.M. Dent & Sons Ltd. Published in 1980 by Harper & Row. Published in 1981 by Sphere Books Ltd.

== See also ==
- Directed panspermia
- Fringe science
- The Andromeda Strain, a 1969 novel about a disease from space
