= Great Flood of 1968 =

1968 floods in France and the UK

Great flood of 1968
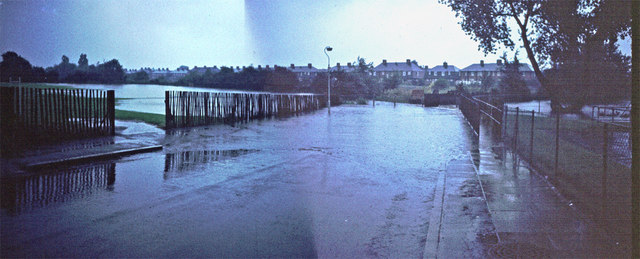
- Pool River in Catford during the flood

Meteorological history
- Date: September 1968

Overall effects
- Fatalities: None
- Damage: More than 14,000 properties flooded.
- Areas affected: Home counties

The Great Flood of 1968 was a flood caused by a pronounced trough of low pressure which brought exceptionally heavy rain and thunderstorms to South East England and France in mid-September 1968, with the worst on Sunday 15 September 1968, and followed earlier floods in South West England during July. This was likely the severest inland flood experienced in the Home Counties during the last 100 years.

The areas worst hit were Crawley, East Grinstead, Horley, Lewisham, Petersfield, Redhill, Tilbury, Tunbridge Wells and Tonbridge.

On 15 September 1968, the 9:50 Charing Cross to Hastings was diverted along the Edenbridge line, but was surrounded by flood water at Edenbridge railway station. 150 passengers spent 12 hours stuck on the train.

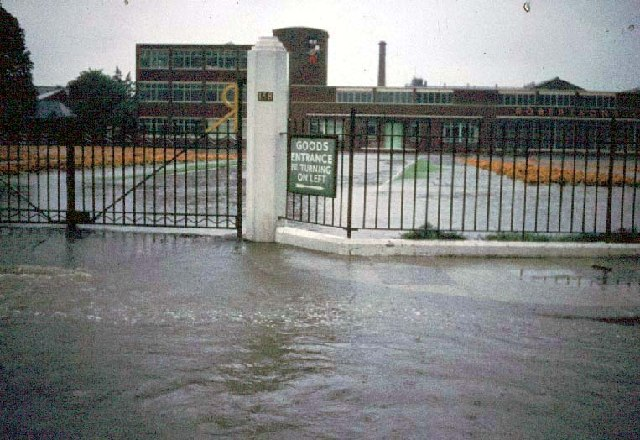
Robertson's Jam factory

== France ==
In the first seven hours of 15 September 1968 three inches of rain fell on Nice. In Toulon a cyclist was killed by an electricity cable that had fallen into the flooded road. The wine harvest was seriously damaged.

== See also ==
- 1947 Thames flood
- July 1968 England and Wales dust fall storms, severe storms in July
- Chew Stoke flood of 1968, July flooding event in Somerset.
