= Alkaline precipitation =

Alkaline precipitation occurs due to natural and anthropogenic causes. It happens when minerals, such as calcium, aluminum, or magnesium combine with other minerals to form alkaline residues that are emitted into the atmosphere, absorbed by water droplets in clouds, and eventually fall as rain. Aquatic environments are especially impacted by alkaline precipitation. Because alkaline precipitation can be harmful to the environment, it is important to utilize various methods such as air pollution control, solidification and stabilization, and remediation to manage it.

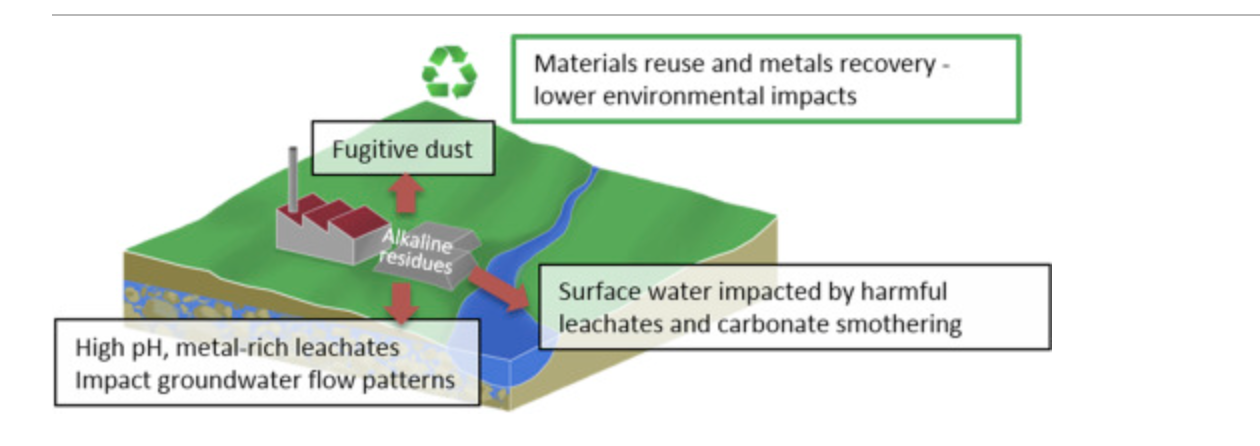
The impact of alkaline residue in the environment. Industrial processes produce alkaline residue that leaks into the environment such as groundwater changing the pH or can become fugitive dust in the air.

== Natural causes ==
While most natural rains are weakly acidic, alkaline rain can also occur in natural conditions without the significant impact of pollutants. Natural alkaline rains from semiarid areas carry a substantial amount of mineral dust lifted from desert soil convection and transported by winds. After mixing with water vapor, they are carried by clouds and deposited on the ground in the form of rain dust.

== Anthropogenic causes ==
The principal cause of alkaline rain are emissions from factories and waste deposits. Mineral dust containing large amounts of alkaline compounds such as calcium carbonate can also increase the pH of precipitation and contribute to basic rain. Alkaline rain can be viewed as opposite to acid rain. Industrial processes such as coal combustion, limestone, chromium ore, alumina extraction, iron, and steel manufacture can cause pollution by producing alkaline residue. These residues are significant and increasing in the global flux and are composed of sodium, calcium, or magnesium oxides that are hydrated to produce soluble hydroxides. Other sources include the surfaces of unpaved roads and soils that are covered in major alkaline elements (e.g. sodium, calcium, magnesium, and potassium).

=== Impacts of alkaline precipitation ===
Alkaline precipitation increases the pH of rainwater to 8.5-10, causing disturbances in aquatic ecosystems. These disturbances can cause physiological changes to aquatic life, changing the rates at which ammonia is dispelled, which leads to accumulation in organisms. The pH change in the water can cause precipitation of calcite from alkaline leachates that suffocate benthic and littoral aquatic habitats, along with reducing light penetration.

=== Management ===
Air pollution control yields two management practices of recycling ceramic material or landfill after treatment. These practices are made possible by several treatment methods of solidification/stabilization, thermal, and combined. The most commonly used method for dealing with these types of waste such as bauxite is solidification / stabilization. Remediation for alkaline leachate requires active aeration in order to promote carbonation, recirculation of drainage waters over stockpiled or lagooned residues, and acid dosing. Strong acids (e.g. hydrochloric acid and sulfuric acid) are also used in neutralizing the pH; this is used at active processing plants but the liquid runoff can remain toxic to aquatic environments. Wetlands are also a low-cost remedy for alkaline leachates.

== See also ==
- Acid rain
