= Rain dust =

Form of precipitation containing visible dust

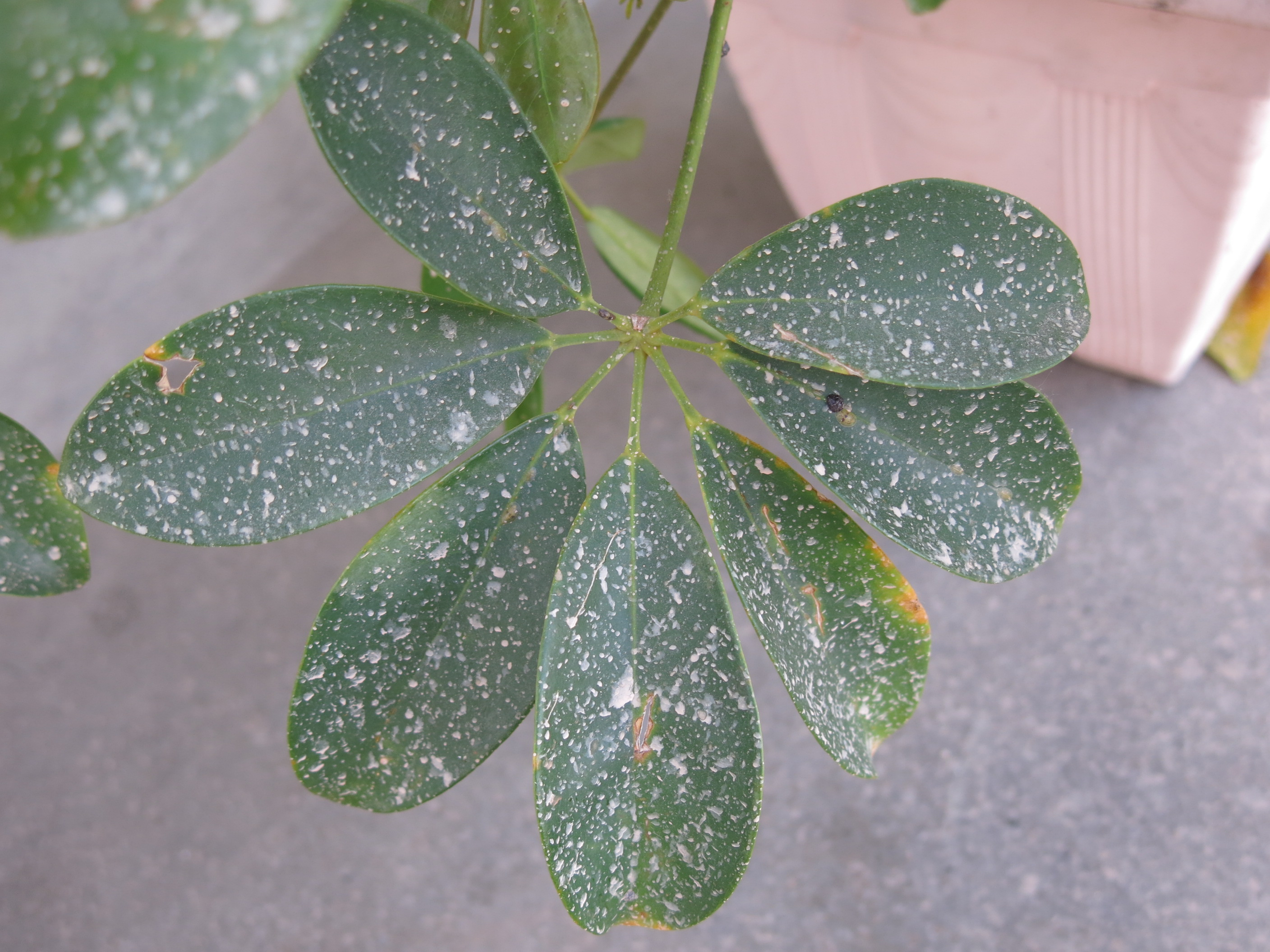
The leaves of this Schefflera show the dust marks left by rain dust (near Paris, France)

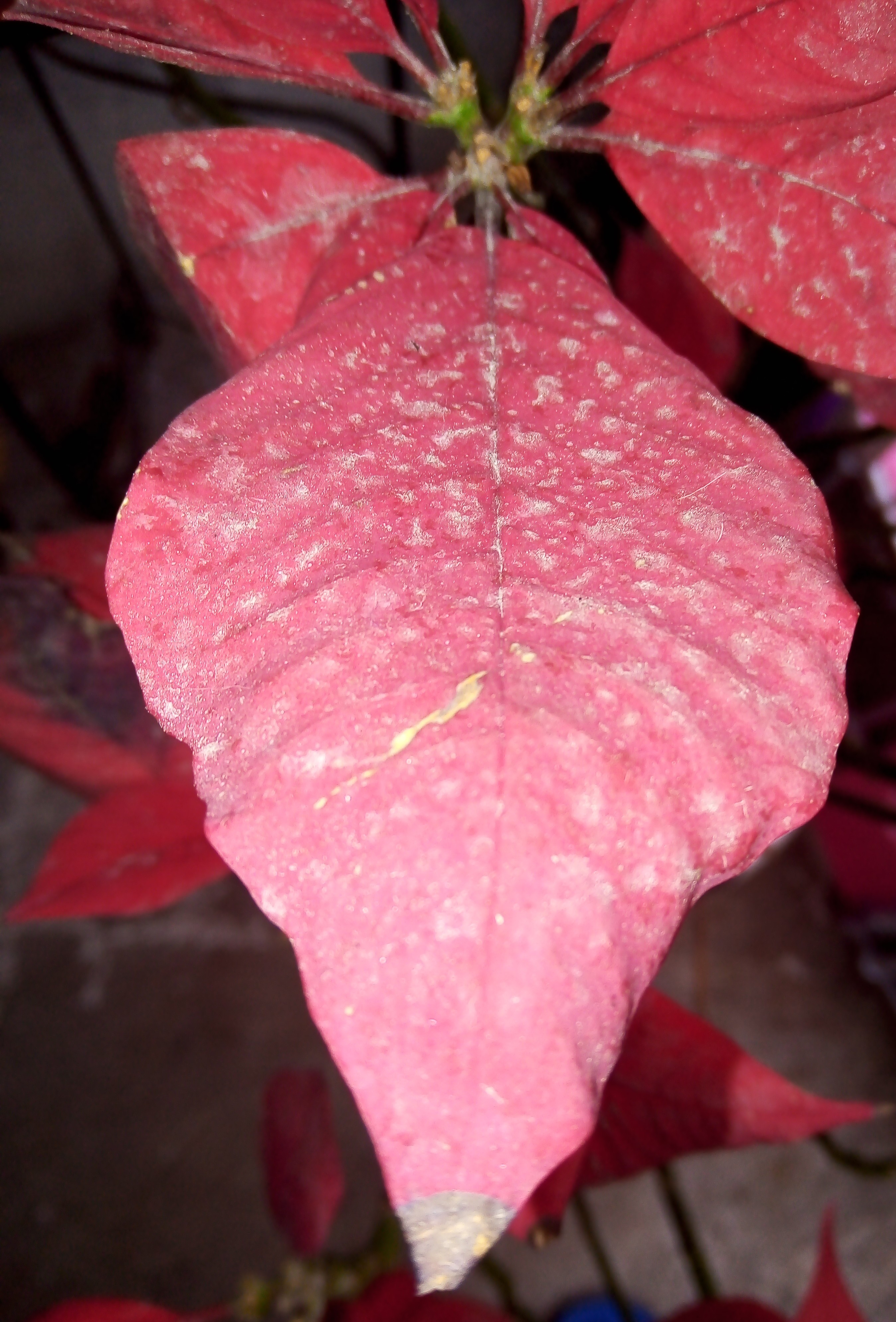
Air pollution often causes rain to leave stains of dust after it evaporates, in Monterrey, Mexico.

Rain dust or snow dust, traditionally known as muddy rain, red rain, or coloured rain, is a variety of rain (or any other form of precipitation) which contains enough mineral dust, from soils (particularly from deserts), for the dust to be visible without using a microscope.

== History ==
The rain dust phenomenon was studied by Italian scientist Giuseppe Maria Giovene (1753–1837), who managed to correctly explain the phenomenon as early as 1803. On 7 March 1803, rain dust fell over Southern Italy's region Apulia. At that time, people believed that the rain was caused by the explosions of Italy's volcanoes Mount Vesuvius or Etna, or that it was due to the transport of matter coming from the sea floor and raised by vapor. Giuseppe Maria Giovene related the phenomenon to the wind which occurred prior to the rain event, and he came to the conclusion that the sand had come from Africa and that it had been pushed by the wind coming from south-east.

== Geography ==
Rain dust is common in the Western and Southern Mediterranean, where the dust supply comes from the atmospheric depressions going through the northern part of North Africa. The main sources of desert dust reach the Iberian Peninsula and the Balearic Islands in the form of dust transported by wind or rain from the Sahara, Atlas Mountains in Morocco and Central Algeria.

Mud rains are relatively frequent and had been increasing in early 1990s in the Mediterranean Basin.

It also occurs in arid desert regions of North America such as west Texas or Arizona. It occasionally happens in the grasslands as it did in Bexar County, Texas on March 18, 2008, and in the Chicago metropolitan area on March 19, 2025, when severe storms lofted dust from surrounding agricultural plains across Illinois.

== Dust composition ==
The rain dust is very alkaline. Some of the large particles contain mixtures of chemicals such as sulfate and sea salt (chiefly with sodium, chlorine and magnesium). Major minerals in order of decreasing abundance are: illite, quartz, smectite, palygorskite, kaolinite, calcite, dolomite and feldspars. In Majorca a study finds that the size, by volume, 89% of the particles from rain dust fraction corresponded to silt (between 0.002 mm and 0.063 mm) and that there was virtually no clay sized particles (less than 0.29%).

== Importance ==
- The particulates that rain dust carries are important for the formation of long-term soil counteracting, in large part, the effects of soil erosion. The amount of solids in rain dust have been estimated at 5.3 g m^{−2}yr^{−1} (in a study made in Montseny, Catalonia) in this location the dust provides 34% of the calcium needed by the holm oak. The amount of the deposition of dust particles is highly variable depending on the year.
- Saharan dust significantly increases the pH of rain water. This may counteract the effects of acid rain.
- Radioactive fallout from the Chernobyl disaster, originally deposited by wind in the immediate aftermath of the disaster in the Sahara Desert, was carried and deposited by rain dust to Northern Greece in 2000.

== Blood Rain ==
While rain dust can cause blood rain, also known as red rain, there are other causes, such as in the case of red rain in Kerala, which is instead caused by the presence of algae spores in the rain.

== See also ==
- July 1968 England and Wales dust fall storms
- Alkaline precipitation

== Bibliography ==
- Andrea Tripaldi (1841). "Elogio storico del canonico arciprete Giuseppe Maria Giovene". Memorie di matematica e di fisica della Società italiana delle scienze residente in Modena. 22. Modena: Tipi della R. D. Camera.
- Giuseppe Maria Giovene (1803). Lettera su di una pioggia rossa.
