= Chandra Wickramasinghe =

British astronomer (born 1939)

Chandra Wickramasinghe MBE
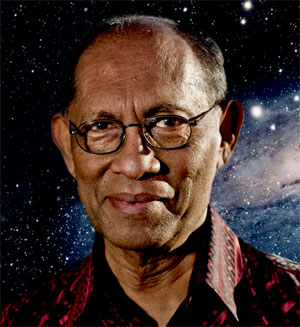
- Wickramasinghe at the University of Buckingham
- Born: 20 January 1939 (age 87)
- Education: Royal College, Colombo; University of Ceylon (BSc); Cambridge University (PhD, ScD)
- Known for: Organic composition of cosmic dust
- Awards: Fellow of Jesus College, Cambridge University (1963–1973); Vidya Jyothi (1992)
- Scientific career
- Fields: Astrobiology; Astronomy; Mathematics
- Workplaces: Cambridge University; University College Cardiff; University of Cardiff; University of Buckingham; University of Ruhuna
- Doctoral advisor: Fred Hoyle

Nalin Chandra Wickramasinghe MBE (born 20 January 1939) is a Sri Lankan-born British mathematician and astronomer. His research interests include the interstellar medium, infrared astronomy, light scattering theory, applications of solid-state physics to astronomy, the early Solar System, comets, astrochemistry, the origin of life and astrobiology. A student and collaborator of Fred Hoyle, the pair worked jointly for over 40 years as the most famous proponents of a non-mainstream version of panspermia, the proposal that life was seeded (or continues to be seeded) on Earth through space-based processes. In 1974 they proposed that some dust in interstellar space matched the spectral characteristics of freeze-dried bacteria, which was largely ignored at its publishing while the ubiquity of polycyclic aromatic hydrocarbons explains the apparent match.

Wickramasinghe has advanced numerous fringe claims, including the argument that various outbreaks of illnesses on Earth are of extraterrestrial origins, including the 1918 flu pandemic and certain outbreaks of polio and mad cow disease. For the 1918 flu pandemic they proposed that cometary dust brought the virus to Earth simultaneously at multiple locations—a view dismissed by experts on this pandemic. Claims connecting terrestrial disease and extraterrestrial pathogens have been rejected by the scientific community.

Wickramasinghe has written more than 40 books about astrophysics and related topics; he has made appearances on radio, television and film, and he writes online blogs and articles. He has appeared on BBC Horizon, UK Channel 5 and the History Channel. He appeared on the 2013 Discovery Channel program "Red Rain". He has an association with Daisaku Ikeda, president of the Buddhist sect Soka Gakkai International, that led to the publication of a dialogue with him, first in Japanese and later in English, on the topic of Space and Eternal Life.

== Education and career ==
Wickramasinghe studied at Royal College, Colombo, the University of Ceylon (where he graduated in 1960 with a BSc First Class Honours in mathematics), and at Trinity College and Jesus College, Cambridge, where he obtained his PhD and ScD degrees. Following his education, Wickramasinghe was a Fellow of Jesus College, Cambridge from 1963 to 1973, then became professor of applied mathematics and astronomy at University College Cardiff. Wickramasinghe was a consultant and advisor to the President of Sri Lanka from 1982 to 1984, and played a key role in founding the Institute of Fundamental Studies in Sri Lanka.

After fifteen years at University College Cardiff, Wickramasinghe took an equivalent position in the University of Cardiff, a post he held from 1990 until 2006. After retirement in 2006, he incubated the Cardiff Center for Astrobiology as a special project reporting to the president of the university. In 2011 the project closed down, losing its funding in a series of UK educational cut backs. After this event, Wickramasinghe was offered the opportunity to move to the University of Buckingham as Director of the Buckingham Centre for Astrobiology, University of Buckingham where he has been since 2011. He maintains his part-time position as a UK Professor at Cardiff University. In 2015 he was elected Visiting scholar, Churchill College, Cambridge, England for 2015 and 2016.

He is a co-founder and board member of the Institute for the Study of Panspermia and Astroeconomics, set up in Japan in 2014, and the Editor-in-Chief of the Journal of Astrobiology & Outreach. He was a Visiting By-Fellow, Churchill College, Cambridge, England 2015/16; Professor and Director of the Buckingham Centre for Astrobiology at the University of Buckingham, a post he has held since 2011; Affiliated Visiting Professor, University of Peradeniya, Sri Lanka; and a board member and research director at the Institute for the Study of Panspermia and Astroeconomics, Ogaki-City, Gifu, Japan.

In 2017, Wickramasinghe was appointed adjunct professor in the Department of Physics, at the University of Ruhuna, Matara, Sri Lanka.

== Research ==
In 1960 he commenced work in Cambridge on his PhD degree under the supervision of Fred Hoyle, and published his first scientific paper "On Graphite Particles as Interstellar Grains" in Monthly Notices of the Royal Astronomical Society in 1962. He was awarded a PhD degree in mathematics in 1963 and was elected a Fellow of Jesus College Cambridge in the same year. In the following year he was appointed a Staff Member of the Institute of Astronomy, Cambridge. Here he continued to work on the nature of interstellar dust, publishing many papers in this field, that led to a consideration of carbon-containing grains as well as the older silicate models.

Wickramasinghe published the first definitive book on Interstellar Grains in 1967. He has made many contributions to this field, publishing over 350 papers in peer-reviewed journals, over 75 of which are in Nature. Hoyle and Wickramasinghe further proposed a radical kind of panspermia that included the claim that extraterrestrial life forms enter the Earth's atmosphere and were possibly responsible for epidemic outbreaks, new diseases, and genetic novelty that Hoyle and Wickramasinghe contended was necessary for macroevolution.

Chandra Wickramasinghe had the longest-running collaboration with Fred Hoyle. Their publications on books and papers arguing for panspermia and a cosmic hypothesis of life are controversial and, in particular detail, essentially contra the scientific consensus in both astrophysics and biology. Several claims made by Hoyle and Wickramasinghe between 1977 and 1981, such as a report of having detected interstellar cellulose, were criticised by one author as pseudoscience. Phil Plait has described Wickramasinghe as a "fringe scientist" who "jumps on everything, with little or no evidence, and says it's from outer space".

=== Organic molecules in space ===
In 1974 Wickramasinghe first proposed the hypothesis that some dust in interstellar space was largely organic, and followed this up with other research confirming the hypothesis. Wickramasinghe also proposed and confirmed the existence of polymeric compounds based on the molecule formaldehyde (H_{2}CO). Fred Hoyle and Wickramasinghe later proposed the identification of bicyclic aromatic compounds from an analysis of the ultraviolet extinction absorption at 2175A., thus demonstrating the existence of polycyclic aromatic hydrocarbon molecules in space.

=== Hoyle–Wickramasinghe model of panspermia ===
Throughout his career, Wickramasinghe, along with his collaborator Fred Hoyle, has advanced the panspermia hypothesis, that proposes that life on Earth is, at least in part, of extraterrestrial origin. The Hoyle–Wickramasinghe model of panspermia include the assumptions that dormant viruses and desiccated DNA and RNA can survive unprotected in space; that small bodies such as asteroids and comets can protect the "seeds of life", including DNA and RNA, living, fossilized, or dormant life, cellular or non-cellular; and that the collisions of asteroids, comets, and moons have the potential to spread these "seeds of life" throughout an individual star system and then onward to others. The most contentious issue around the Hoyle–Wickramasinghe model of the panspermia hypothesis is the corollary of their first two propositions that viruses and bacteria continue to enter the Earth's atmosphere from space, and are hence responsible for many major epidemics throughout history.

Towards the end of their collaboration, Wickramasinghe and Hoyle hypothesised that abiogenesis occurred close to the Galactic Center before panspermia carried life throughout the Milky Way, and stated a belief that such a process could occur in many galaxies throughout the Universe.

=== Detection of living cells in the stratosphere ===
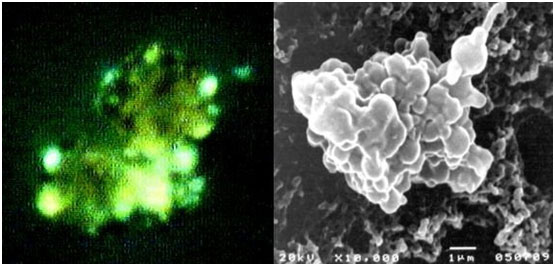
An image of a clump of microorganisms from 41 km fluorescing on application of a carbocyanine dye (indicating viability) is shown in the left panel, and scanning electron microscope image of a similar clump is shown on the right panel.

On 20 January 2001 the Indian Space Research Organisation (ISRO) conducted a balloon flight from Hyderabad, India to collect stratospheric dust from a height of 41 km (135,000 ft) with a view to testing for the presence of living cells. The collaborators on this project included a team of UK scientists led by Wickramasinghe. In a paper presented at a SPIE conference in San Diego in 2002 the detection of evidence for viable microorganisms from 41 km above the Earth's surface was presented. However, the experiment did not present evidence as to whether the findings are incoming microbes from space rather than microbes carried up to 41 km from the surface of the Earth.

In 2005 the ISRO group carried out a second stratospheric sampling experiment from 41 km altitude and reported the isolation of three new species of bacteria including one that they named Janibacter hoylei sp.nov. in honour of Fred Hoyle. However, these facts do not prove that bacteria on Earth originated in the cosmic environment. Samplings of the stratosphere have also been carried out by Yang et al. (2005, 2009). During the experiment strains of highly radiation-resistant Deinococcus bacterium were detected at heights up to 35 km. Nevertheless, these authors have abstained from linking these discoveries to panspermia. Wickramasinghe was also involved in coordinating analyses of the red rain in Kerala in collaborations with Godfrey Louis.

=== Extraterrestrial pathogens ===
Hoyle and Wickramasinghe have advanced the argument that various outbreaks of illnesses on Earth are of extraterrestrial origins, including the 1918 flu pandemic and certain outbreaks of polio and mad cow disease. For the 1918 flu pandemic they hypothesised that cometary dust brought the virus to Earth simultaneously at multiple locations—a view almost universally dismissed by external experts on this pandemic.

On 24 May 2003 The Lancet published a letter from Wickramasinghe, jointly signed by Milton Wainwright and Jayant Narlikar, in which they hypothesised that the virus that causes severe acute respiratory syndrome (SARS) could be extraterrestrial in origin instead of originating from chickens. The Lancet subsequently published three responses to this letter, showing that the hypothesis was not evidence-based, and casting doubts on the quality of the experiments referenced by Wickramasinghe in his letter. Claims connecting terrestrial disease and extraterrestrial pathogens have been rejected by the scientific community.

In 2020, Wickramasinghe and colleagues published a paper claiming that Severe acute respiratory syndrome coronavirus 2, the virus responsible for the COVID-19 pandemic was also of extraterrestrial origin, the claim was criticised for lacking evidence.

=== Polonnaruwa ===
On 29 December 2012 a green fireball was observed in Polonnaruwa, Sri Lanka. It disintegrated into fragments that fell to the Earth near the villages of Aralaganwila and Dimbulagala and in a rice field near Dalukkane. Rock samples were submitted to the Medical Research Institute of the Ministry of Health in Colombo.

The rocks were sent to the University of Cardiff in Wales for analysis, where Chandra Wickramasinghe's team analyzed them and claimed that they contained extraterrestrial diatoms. From January to March 2013, five papers were published in the fringe Journal of Cosmology outlining various results from teams in the United Kingdom, United States and Germany. However, independent experts in meteoritics stated that the object analyzed by Wickramasinghe's team was of terrestrial origin, a fulgurite created by lightning strikes on Earth. Experts in diatoms complemented the statement, saying that the organisms found in the rock represented a wide range of extant terrestrial taxa, confirming their earthly origin.

Wickramasinghe and collaborators responded, using X-ray diffraction, oxygen isotope analysis, and scanning electron microscope observations, in a March 2013 paper asserting that the rocks they found were indeed meteorites, instead of being created by lightning strikes on Earth as stated by scientists from the University of Peradeniya. However, these claims were also criticised for not providing evidence that the rocks were actually meteorites.

=== Cephalopod alien origin ===
In 2018, Wickramasinghe and over 30 other authors published a paper in Progress in Biophysics and Molecular Biology entitled "Cause of Cambrian Explosion - Terrestrial or Cosmic?" which argued in favour of panspermia as the origin of the Cambrian explosion, and posited that cephalopods are alien lifeforms that originated from frozen eggs that were transported to earth via meteor. The claims gained widespread press coverage. Virologist Karin Mölling, in a companion commentary published in the same journal, stated that the claims "cannot be taken seriously".

== Participation in the creation-evolution debate ==
Wickramasinghe and his mentor Fred Hoyle have also used their data to argue in favor of cosmic ancestry, and against the idea of life emerging from inanimate objects by abiogenesis.

Once again the Universe gives the appearance of being biologically constructed, and on this occasion on a truly vast scale. Once again those who consider such thoughts to be too outlandish to be taken seriously will continue to do so. While we ourselves shall continue to take the view that those who believe they can match the complexities of the Universe by simple experiments in their laboratories will continue to be disappointed.

Wickramasinghe attempts to present scientific evidence to support the notion of cosmic ancestry and "the possibility of high intelligence in the Universe and of many increasing levels of intelligence converging toward a God as an ideal limit."

During the 1981 scientific creationist trial in Arkansas, Wickramasinghe was the only scientist testifying for the defense, which in turn was supporting creationism. In addition, he wrote that the Archaeopteryx fossil finding is a forgery, a charge that the scientific community considers an "absurd" and "ignorant" statement.

== Honours and awards ==
- Commonwealth Scholar at Trinity College, Cambridge, 1960-1963
- Powell Prize for English Verse, Trinity College, 1961
- Vidya Jyothi from the President of Sri Lanka, 1992
- Honorary DLitt, Sōka University (Japan), 1996
- Doctor of Science (honoris causa), University of Ruhuna, Sri Lanka, 2004
- Visiting By-Fellowship, visiting scholar, Churchill College, Cambridge, England 2015/16
- Ada Derana Sri Lankan of the Year 2017 - Global Scientist

Wickramasinghe was appointed Member of the Order of the British Empire (MBE) in the 2022 New Year Honours for services to science, astronomy and astrobiology.

== Books ==
- Interstellar Grains (Chapman & Hall, London, 1967)
- Light Scattering Functions for Small Particles with Applications in Astronomy (Wiley, New York, 1973)
- Solid-State Astrophysics (ed. with D.J. Morgan) (D. Reidel, Boston, 1975)
- Interstellar Matter (with F.D. Khan & P.G. Mezger) (Swiss Society of Astronomy and Astrophysics, 1974)
- The Cosmic Laboratory (University College of Cardiff, 1975)
- Lifecloud: The Origin of Life in the Universe (with Fred Hoyle) (J.M. Dent, London, 1978)
- Diseases from Space (with Fred Hoyle) (J.M. Dent, London, 1979)
- Origin of Life (with Fred Hoyle) (University College Cardiff Press, 1979)
- Space Travellers: The Bringers of Life (with Fred Hoyle) (University College Cardiff Press, 1981)
- Evolution from Space (with Fred Hoyle) (J.M. Dent, London, 1981) ISBN 978-0-460-04535-3
- Is Life an Astronomical Phenomenon? (University College Cardiff Press, 1982) ISBN 978-0-906449-49-3
- Why Neo-Darwinism Does Not Work (with Fred Hoyle) (University College Cardiff Press, 1982) ISBN 978-0-906449-50-9
- Proofs that Life is Cosmic (with Fred Hoyle) (Institute of Fundamental Studies, Sri Lanka, Memoirs no.1, 1982)
- From Grains to Bacteria (with Fred Hoyle) (University College Cardiff Press, 1984) ISBN 978-0-906449-64-6
- Fundamental Studies and the Future of Science (ed.) (University College Cardiff Press, 1984) ISBN 978-0-906449-57-8
- Living Comets (with Fred Hoyle) (University College Cardiff Press, 1985) ISBN 978-0-906449-79-0
- Archaeopteryx, the Primordial Bird: A Case of Fossil Forgery (with Fred Hoyle) (Christopher Davies, Swansea, 1986) ISBN 978-0-7154-0665-6
- The Theory of Cosmic Grains (with Fred Hoyle) (Kluwer, Dordrecht, 1991) ISBN 978-0-7923-1189-8
- Life on Mars? The Case for a Cosmic Heritage (with Fred Hoyle) (Clinical Press, Bristol, 1997) ISBN 978-1-85457-041-3
- Astronomical Origins of Life: Steps towards Panspermia (with Fred Hoyle) (Kluwer, Dordrecht, 2000) ISBN 978-0-7923-6081-0
- Cosmic Dragons: Life and Death on Our Planet (Souvenir Press, London, 2001) ISBN 978-0-285-63606-4
- Fred Hoyle's Universe (ed. with G. Burbidge and J. Narlikar) (Kluwer, Dordrecht, 2003) ISBN 978-1-4020-1415-4
- A Journey with Fred Hoyle (World Scientific, Singapore, 2005) ISBN 978-981-256-579-2
- Comets and the Origin of Life (with J. Wickramasinghe and W. Napier) (World Scientific, Hackensack NJ, 2010) ISBN 978-981-281-400-5
- A Journey with Fred Hoyle, Second Edition (World Scientific, Singapore, April 2013) ISBN 978-981-4436-12-0
- The search for our cosmic ancestry, World Scientific, New Jersey 2015, ISBN 978-981-461696-6.
- Walker, Theodore; Wickramasinghe, Chandra (2015). The Big Bang and God: An Astro-Theology. Palgrave Macmillan US. doi:10.1057/9781137535030. ISBN 978-1-349-57419-3.

== Articles ==
- Hoyle, F. and Wickramasinghe, N.C., 1962. On graphite particles as interstellar grains, Mon.Not.Roy.Astr.Soc. 124, 417-433
- Hoyle, F.; Wickramasinghe, N.C. (1969). "Interstellar Grains". Nature. 223 (5205): 450–462. Bibcode:1969Natur.223..459H. doi:10.1038/223459a0. S2CID 4209522.
- Wickramasinghe, N. C. (1974). "Formaldehyde polymers in interstellar space". Nature. 252 (5483): 462–463. Bibcode:1974Natur.252..462W. doi:10.1038/252462a0. ISSN 0028-0836.
- Wickramasinghe, N.C. (1999). "Formaldehyde Polymers in Interstellar Space". Astrophysics and Space Science. 268 (1–3): 111–114. Bibcode:1999Ap&SS.268..111W. doi:10.1023/A:1002448820097. ISSN 0004-640X.
- Wickramasinghe, N.C.; Hoyle, F.; Brooks, J.; Shaw, G. (1977). "Prebiotic polymers and infrared spectra of galactic sources". Nature. 269 (5630): 674–676. Bibcode:1977Natur.269..674W. doi:10.1038/269674a0. S2CID 4266722.
- Hoyle, F. and Wickramasinghe, N.C., 1977. Identification of the λ2,200A interstellar absorption feature, Nature 270, 323-324
- F., Hoyle; N. C., Wickramasinghe (4 November 1976). "Primitive grain clumps and organic compounds in carbonaceous chondrites" (PDF). Nature. 264 (5581): 45–46. Bibcode:1976Natur.264...45H. doi:10.1038/264045a0.
- Hoyle, F. and Wickramasinghe, N.C., 1977. Polysaccharides and infrared spectra of galactic sources, Nature 268, 610-612
- Hoyle, F.; Wickramasinghe, N.C. (1979). "On the nature of interstellar grains". Astrophysics and Space Science. 66 (1–3): 77–90. Bibcode:1999Ap&SS.268..249H. doi:10.1023/A:1002462602776. S2CID 189820472.
- Hoyle, F.; Wickramasinghe, N.C. (1979). "Biochemical chromophores and the interstellar extinction at ultraviolet wavelengths". Astrophysics and Space Science. 65 (1): 241–244. Bibcode:1979Ap&SS..65..241H. doi:10.1007/BF00643503. S2CID 120184918.
- Hoyle, F.; Wickramasinghe, N.C.; Al-Mufti, S.; et al. (1982). "Infrared spectroscopy over the 2.9-3.9 μm waveband in biochemistry and astronomy". Astrophysics and Space Science. 83 (1–3): 405–409. Bibcode:1999Ap&SS.268..161H. doi:10.1023/A:1002417307802.
- Hoyle, F.; Wickramasinghe, N.C.; Al-Mufti, S. (1982). "Organo-siliceous biomolecules and the infrared spectrum of the Trapezium nebula". Astrophysics and Space Science. 86 (1): 63–69. Bibcode:1982Ap&SS..86...63H. doi:10.1007/BF00651830. S2CID 120249547.
- Hoyle, F.; Wickramasinghe, N.C. (1983). "Bacterial life in space". Nature. 306 (5942): 420. Bibcode:1983Natur.306..420H. doi:10.1038/306420a0. PMID 6646221.
- Hoyle, F. and Wickramasinghe, N.C., 1986. The case for life as a cosmic phenomenon, Nature 322, 509-511
- Hoyle, F. and Wickramasinghe, N.C., 1990. Influenza – evidence against contagion, Journal of the Royal Society of Medicine 83. 258-261
- Napier, W.M.; Wickramasinghe, J.T; Wickramasinghe, N.C. (2007). "The origin of life in comets". International Journal of Astrobiology. 6 (4): 321–323. Bibcode:2007IJAsB...6..321N. doi:10.1017/S1473550407003941. S2CID 121008660.
- Rauf, K.; Wickramasinghe, C. (2010). "Evidence for biodegradation products in the interstellar medium". International Journal of Astrobiology. 9 (1): 29–34. Bibcode:2010IJAsB...9...29R. doi:10.1017/S1473550409990334. S2CID 17336375.
- Wickramasinghe, N. C. (2010). "The astrobiological case for our cosmic ancestry". International Journal of Astrobiology. 9 (2): 119–129. Bibcode:2010IJAsB...9..119W. doi:10.1017/S1473550409990413. S2CID 13978227.
- Wickramasinghe, N.C.; Wallis, J.; Wallis, D.H.; Schild, R.E.; Gibson, C.H. (2012). "Life-bearing planets in the solar vicinity". Astrophysics and Space Science. 341 (2): 295–9. Bibcode:2012Ap&SS.341..295W. doi:10.1007/s10509-012-1092-8. S2CID 120484953.
- Chandra Wickramasinghe, A Journey with Fred Hoyle: The Search for Cosmic Life, World Scientific Publishing, 2005, ISBN 981-238-912-1
- Janaki Wickramasinghe, Chandra Wickramasinghe and William Napier, Comets and the Origin of Life, World Scientific Publishing, 2009, ISBN 981-256-635-X
- Chandra Wickramasinghe and Daisaku Ikeda, Space and Eternal Life, Journeyman Press, 1998, ISBN 1-85172-060-X

== See also ==
- Panspermia
- Red rain in Kerala
- Milton Wainwright
