= Milton Wainwright =

British microbiologist (born 1950)

- Born: 23 February 1950 (age 76)
- Citizenship: British
- Education: University of Nottingham
- Known for: "Alien Bugs", Neopanspermia
- Scientific career
- Fields: Microbiology, Astrobiology
- Workplaces: University of Nottingham (BSc & PhD); National Research Council (Canada) (Postdoctoral Fellow); Department Of Molecular Biology and Biotechnology, University of Sheffield

Milton Wainwright (born 23 February 1950) is a British microbiologist who is known for his research into what he claims could be extraterrestrial life found in the stratosphere.

== Biography ==
Wainwright graduated from the University of Nottingham in the field of botany. He obtained a PhD from the same university in the field of mycology. From 1974 to 1975 he went to the National Research Council of Canada as postdoctoral fellow, where he obtained a qualification in environmental microbiology. From 1975 to 1986, he was a lecturer in microbiology at the University of Sheffield.

== Research ==
Wainwright's interests are in astrobiology and the history of science.

In 2008, he claimed that the idea of natural selection is not original to Charles Darwin's or Alfred Russel Wallace's theory. Also, he has claimed that the red rain in Kerala is a biological entity. Wainwright has also written widely about the history of the discovery of penicillin (including that Adolf Hitler's life was saved by the drug) and streptomycin and on the hypothesis that bacteria and other non-virus microbes cause cancer.

In the 1980s Wainwright interviewed Rutgers University faculty members for his 1990 book on antibiotics, Miracle Cure, asking questions about Albert Schatz, which piqued the curiosity of some professors, who made their own inquiries and spoke with Schatz. A group of them began to lobby for Schatz's rehabilitation, because they were convinced that Schatz had been the victim of an injustice when the 1952 Nobel Prize in Physiology or Medicine was awarded solely to Selman Waksman. This culminated in Rutgers awarding Schatz the 1994 Rutgers University Medal, the university's highest honor.

Wainwright identifies as an agnostic.

== Books ==
- Wainwright, Milton (1990). Miracle Cure: The Story of Penicillin and the Golden Age of Antibiotics. Blackwell. ISBN 978-0-631-16492-0.
- Wainwright, Milton (1999). An Introduction to Environmental Biotechnology. doi:10.1007/978-1-4615-5251-2. ISBN 978-1-4613-7394-0.

== Honours and awards ==
- Honorary Professor, Cardiff University, Great Britain, 2009
- Honorary Professor, King Saud University, Saudi Arabia, 2010
- Honorary Professor and Fellow of the Buckingham Centre for Astrobiology, University of Buckingham, Great Britain, 2012

== Articles ==
- Wainwright, M.; Alharbi, S.; Wickramasinghe, N.C. (January 2006). "How do microorganisms reach the stratosphere?" (PDF). International Journal of Astrobiology. 5 (1): 13–15. Bibcode:2006IJAsB...5...13W. doi:10.1017/S1473550406002825. S2CID 19014202.
- Shivaji, S., Chaturvedi, P., Kuresh, K., Redy, C.B.S., Wainwright, M. et al. (2006). Bacillus aerius sp. nov. isolated from cryogenic tubes used for collecting air samples from high altitudes. International Journal of Systematic and Evolutionary Microbiology 56,1465–1473.
- Wainwright, M. (2008). Some highlights in the history of mycology—a personal journey. Fungal Biology Reviews, 7, 2297–102.
- Wainwright, M., Leswd, A. and Alshammari, F. (2009). Bacteria in amber coal and clay in relation to lithopanspermia. International Journal of Astrobiology 8,141–143.
- Wainwright, M. (2010). The overlooked link between non-virus microbes and cancer. Science Progress 93, 393–40.
- Wainwright, M. (2002). Do fungi play a role in the aetiology of cancer? Reviews of Medical Microbiology 13, 1–6.
- Wainwright, M. (2006). The potential role of non-virus microorganisms in cancer. Current Trends in Microbiology 2, 48–59.
- Wainwright, Milton (July 2010). "The origin of species without Darwin and Wallace". Saudi Journal of Biological Sciences. 17 (3): 187–204. doi:10.1016/j.sjbs.2010.04.001. PMC 3730928. PMID 23961077.
- Wainwright, M. (2011). Charles Darwin mycologist and refuter of his own myth. Fungi 4, 12–20.
- Wainwright, M. (1991). Streptomycin: discovery and resultant controversy. Journal of the History and Philosophy of the Life Sciences 13, 97–124.
- Wainwright, M. and Swan, H.T. (1986). C.G. Paine and the earliest surviving clinical record of penicillin therapy. Medical History 30, 42–56.

== See also ==
- Panspermia
- Chandra Wickramasinghe
