= Red Rectangle =

Protoplanetary nebula in the constellation Monoceros

Reflection nebula
- Protoplanetary nebula
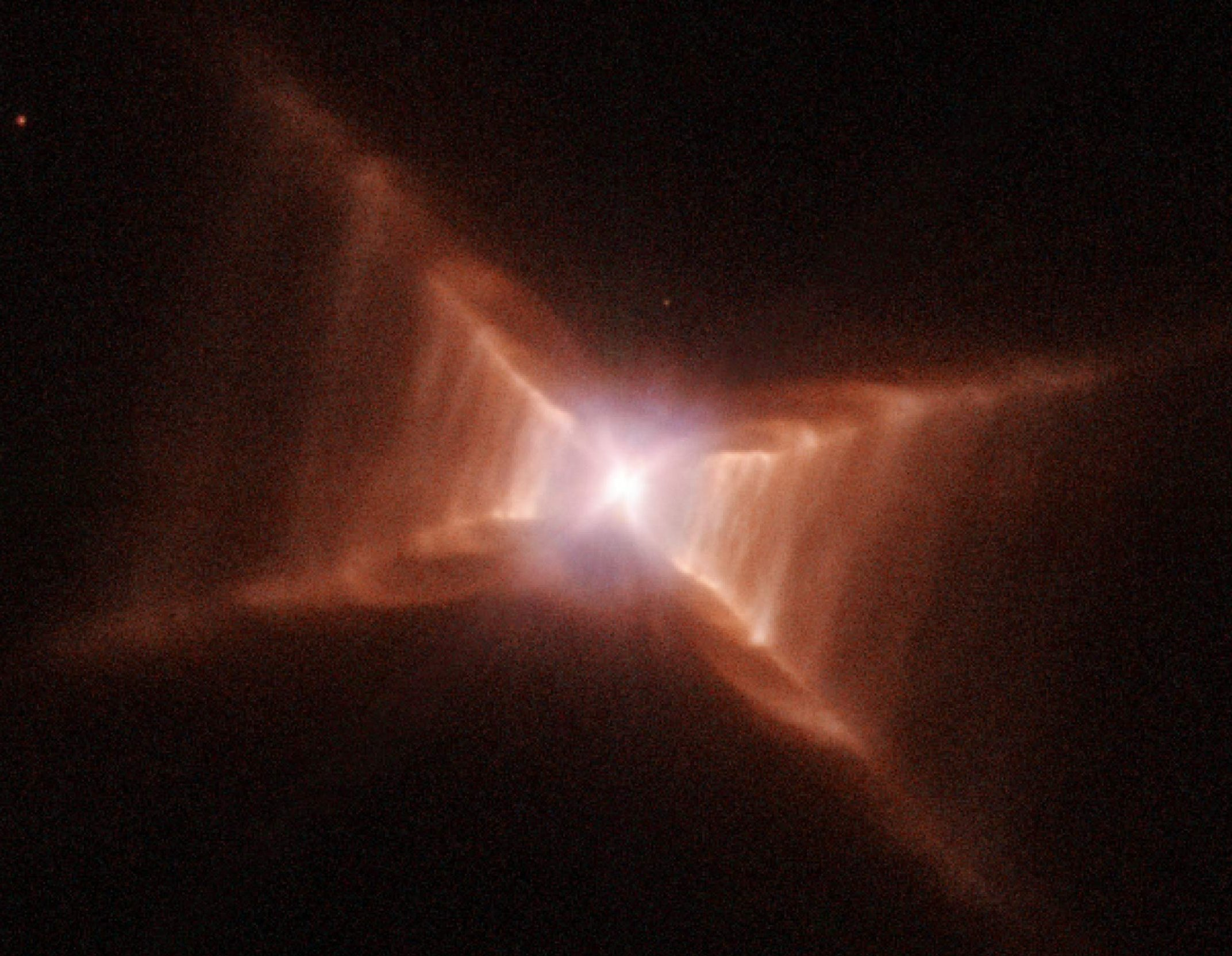
- Hubble Space Telescope WFPC2 image of the Red Rectangle Nebula

Observation data: J2000 epoch
- Right ascension: 06^{h} 19^{m} 58.2160^{s}
- Declination: −10° 38′ 14.691″
- Distance: 2.3 ± 0.3 k ly (710 ± 100 pc)
- Apparent magnitude (V): 9.02
- Constellation: Monoceros

Physical characteristics
- Radius: 0.14 ly
- Notable features: Closest known Protoplanetary Nebula from Earth
- Designations: HD 44179, RAFGL 915

The Red Rectangle, so called because of its red color and unique rectangular shape, is a protoplanetary nebula in the constellation Monoceros. The nebula was discovered in 1973 during a rocket flight associated with the AFCRL Infrared Sky Survey called Hi Star. The binary star at the center of the nebula, designated HD 44179, was first discovered by Robert Grant Aitken in 1915. It has the variable star designation V777 Monocerotis.

The name Red Rectangle was officially added to the IAU Catalog of Star Names on 9 May 2026.

== Characteristics ==
High-resolution images of it in visible and near infrared light reveal a highly symmetric, compact bipolar nebula with X-shaped spikes which imply anisotropic dispersion of the circumstellar material. The central binary system is completely obscured, providing no direct light.

The Red Rectangle is known to be particularly rich in polycyclic aromatic hydrocarbons (PAHs). The presence of such carbon-bearing macromolecules in the X-shaped nebular component, while the equatorial regions are known to contain silicate-rich dust grains and O-bearing molecules, was interpreted as due to a change of the O/C abundance ratio of the primary star during its late evolution. However, PAHs could also be formed as a result of the development of a central photodissociation region, a region in which a very active chemistry appears due to dissociation of stable molecules by the UV emission of the central stellar system. The Red Rectangle was the first nebula around an evolved star in which an equatorial disk in rotation was well identified (the existence of such disks has been demonstrated only in a few of these objects, only expansion is observed in most of them). However, the disk absorbs the stellar light and is practically not seen in the beautiful optical image, which mainly represents a relatively diffuse outflow that is very probably formed of material extracted from the denser disk. The distinct rungs suggest several episodes of increased ejection rate.

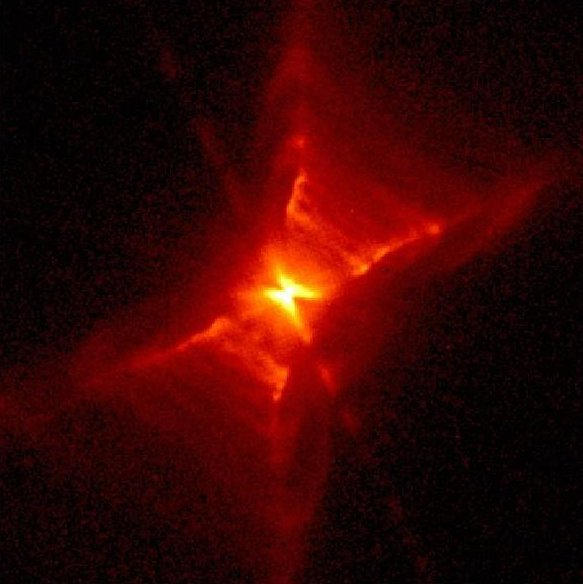
The Red Rectangle is a proto-planetary nebula

The Hubble Space Telescope has revealed a wealth of new features in the Red Rectangle that cannot be seen by ground-based telescopes looking through Earth's turbulent atmosphere. The origins of many of the features in this dying star, in particular its X-shaped image, still remain hidden or even outright mysterious. The presence of a conspicuous bipolar symmetry is usual in protoplanetary and planetary nebulae. Theoretical models have shown that this axial symmetry can appear as a result of shocks due to interaction of different phases of the stellar winds (characteristic of the late stellar evolution), but its origin is still debated. The X-like shape and the low velocity of the outflowing gas in the Red Rectangle are peculiar, probably because its origin (associated to a stable, extended disk) is different than for most protoplanetary nebulae.
