= List of electoral wards in Somerset =

This is a list of electoral divisions and wards in the ceremonial county of Somerset in South West England. All changes since the re-organisation of local government following the passing of the Local Government Act 1972 are shown. The number of councillors elected for each electoral division or ward is shown in brackets.

== Unitary authority councils ==
=== Bath and North East Somerset ===
Wards from 1 April 1996 (first election 4 May 1995) to 6 May 1999:

1. Abbey (2)
2. Bathavon North (3)
3. Bathavon South (2)
4. Bathwick (2)
5. Bloomfield (2)
6. Cameley (1)
7. Chew Valley North & Clutton (2)
8. Chew Valley South (1)
9. Chew Valley West (1)
10. Combe Down (2)
11. Farmborough & High Littleton (1)
12. Keynsham East (2)
13. Keynsham North (1)
14. Keynsham South (2)
15. Keynsham West (1)
16. Kingsmead (2)
17. Lambridge (2)
18. Lansdown (2)
19. Lyncombe (2)
20. Midsomer Norton North (2)
21. Midsomer Norton Redfield (2)
22. Newbridge (2)
23. Newton St Loe (1)
24. Oldfield (2)
25. Paulton (2)
26. Peasedown (2)
27. Radstock (2)
28. Saltford (2)
29. Southdown (2)
30. Timsbury (1)
31. Twerton (2)
32. Walcot (2)
33. Westfield (2)
34. Westmoreland (2)
35. Weston (2)
36. Widcombe (2)

Wards from 6 May 1999 to 2 May 2019:

1. Abbey (2)
2. Bathavon North (3)
3. Bathavon South (1)
4. Bathavon West (1)
5. Bathwick (2)
6. Chew Valley North (1)
7. Chew Valley South (1)
8. Clutton (1)
9. Combe Down (2)
10. Farmborough (1)
11. High Littleton (1)
12. Keynsham East (2)
13. Keynsham North (2)
14. Keynsham South (2)
15. Kingsmead (2)
16. Lambridge (2)
17. Lansdown (2)
18. Lyncombe (2)
19. Mendip (1)
20. Midsomer Norton North (2)
21. Midsomer Norton Redfield (2)
22. Newbridge (2)
23. Odd Down (2)
24. Oldfield (2)
25. Paulton (2)
26. Peasedown (2)
27. Publow & Whitchurch (1)
28. Radstock (2)
29. Saltford (2)
30. Southdown (2)
31. Timsbury (1)
32. Twerton (2)
33. Walcot (2)
34. Westfield (2)
35. Westmoreland (2)
36. Weston (2)
37. Widcombe (2)

Wards from 2 May 2019 to present:

1. Bathavon North (2)
2. Bathavon South (2)
3. Bathwick (2)
4. Chew Valley (2)
5. Clutton & Farmborough (1)
6. Combe Down (2)
7. High Littleton (1)
8. Keynsham East (2)
9. Keynsham North (2)
10. Keynsham South (2)
11. Kingsmead (2)
12. Lambridge (2)
13. Lansdown (2)
14. Mendip (1)
15. Midsomer Norton North (2)
16. Midsomer Norton Redfield (2)
17. Moorlands (1)
18. Newbridge (2)
19. Odd Down (2)
20. Oldfield Park (1)
21. Paulton (2)
22. Peasedown (2)
23. Publow & Whitchurch (1)
24. Radstock (2)
25. Saltford (2)
26. Southdown (2)
27. Timsbury (1)
28. Twerton (2)
29. Walcot (2)
30. Westfield (2)
31. Westmoreland (2)
32. Weston (2)
33. Widcombe & Lyncombe (2)

=== North Somerset ===
Wards from 1 April 1996 (first election 4 May 1995) to 6 May 1999:

1. Backwell (2)
2. Banwell (2)
3. Blagdon (1)
4. Churchill (1)
5. Clevedon Central (1)
6. Clevedon East (1)
7. Clevedon North (1)
8. Clevedon South (1)
9. Clevedon Walton (1)
10. Clevedon West (1)
11. Congresbury (1)
12. Easton in Gordano (2)
13. Gordano (1)
14. Hutton (1)
15. Locking (1)
16. Long Ashton (2)
17. Nailsea East (2)
18. Nailsea North & West (3)
19. North Weston (1)
20. Portishead Central (1)
21. Portishead Coast (1)
22. Portishead South (1)
23. Portishead West (1)
24. Weston-super-Mare Ashcombe (3)
25. Weston-super-Mare East (3)
26. Weston-super-Mare Ellenborough (3)
27. Weston-super-Mare North (3)
28. Weston-super-Mare South (3)
29. Weston-super-Mare Uphill (3)
30. Weston-super-Mare West (3)
31. Winford (1)
32. Winscombe (2)
33. Wraxall (1)
34. Wrington (1)
35. Yatton (3)

Wards from 6 May 1999 to 7 May 2015:

1. Backwell (2) †
2. Banwell & Winscombe (3) †
3. Blagdon & Churchill (1)
4. Clevedon Central (1)
5. Clevedon East (1)
6. Clevedon North (1)
7. Clevedon South (1)
8. Clevedon Walton (1)
9. Clevedon West (1)
10. Clevedon Yeo (1)
11. Congresbury (1)
12. Easton in Gordano (1)
13. Gordano (1)
14. Hutton & Locking (2) †
15. Kewstoke (1) †
16. Nailsea East (2)
17. Nailsea North & West (3)
18. Pill (1)
19. Portishead Central (1)
20. Portishead Coast (1)
21. Portishead East (1)
22. Portishead Redcliffe Bay (1)
23. Portishead South & North Weston (1)
24. Portishead West (1)
25. Weston-super-Mare Central (2)
26. Weston-super-Mare Clarence & Uphill (3) †
27. Weston-super-Mare East (3) †
28. Weston-super-Mare Milton & Old Worle (3)
29. Weston-super-Mare North Worle (3) †
30. Weston-super-Mare South (3)
31. Weston-super-Mare South Worle (3)
32. Weston-super-Mare West (3)
33. Winford (1) †
34. Wraxall & Long Ashton (2)
35. Wrington (1) †
36. Yatton (3)

† minor boundary changes in 2011

Wards from 7 May 2015 to present:

1. Backwell (1)
2. Banwell & Winscombe (2)
3. Blagdon & Churchill (1)
4. Clevedon East (1)
5. Clevedon South (1)
6. Clevedon Walton (1)
7. Clevedon West (1)
8. Clevedon Yeo (1)
9. Congresbury & Puxton (1)
10. Gordano Valley (1)
11. Hutton & Locking (2)
12. Long Ashton (2)
13. Nailsea Golden Valley (1)
14. Nailsea West End (1)
15. Nailsea Yeo (1)
16. Nailsea Youngwood (1)
17. Pill (1)
18. Portishead East (2)
19. Portishead North (1)
20. Portishead South (1)
21. Portishead West (2)
22. Weston-super-Mare Bournville (2)
23. Weston-super-Mare Central (2)
24. Weston-super-Mare Hillside (2)
25. Weston-super-Mare Kewstoke (2)
26. Weston-super-Mare Mid Worle (1)
27. Weston-super-Mare Milton (2)
28. Weston-super-Mare North Worle (2)
29. Weston-super-Mare South Worle (2)
30. Weston-super-Mare Uphill (2)
31. Weston-super-Mare Winterstoke (2)
32. Wick St Lawrence & St Georges (1)
33. Winford (1)
34. Wrington (1)
35. Yatton (2)

=== Somerset ===
Electoral divisions from 1 April 2023 (first election 5 May 2022):

1. Bishop's Hull & Taunton West (2)
2. Blackdown & Neroche (2)
3. Blackmoor Vale (2)
4. Brent (2)
5. Bridgwater East & Bawdrip (2)
6. Bridgwater North & Central (2)
7. Bridgwater South (2)
8. Bridgwater West (2)
9. Brympton (2)
10. Burnham on Sea North (2)
11. Cannington (2)
12. Castle Cary (2)
13. Chard North (2)
14. Chard South (2)
15. Cheddar (2)
16. Coker (2)
17. Comeytrowe & Trull (2)
18. Crewkerne (2)
19. Curry Rivel & Langport (2)
20. Dulverton & Exmoor (2)
21. Dunster (2)
22. Frome East (2)
23. Frome North (2)
24. Frome West (2)
25. Glastonbury (2)
26. Highbridge & Burnham South (2)
27. Huntspill (2)
28. Ilminster (2)
29. King Alfred (2)
30. Lydeard (2)
31. Martock (2)
32. Mendip Central & East (2)
33. Mendip Hills (2)
34. Mendip South (2)
35. Mendip West (2)
36. Minehead (2)
37. Monkton & North Curry (2)
38. North Petherton (2)
39. Rowbarton & Staplegrove (2)
40. Shepton Mallet (2)
41. Somerton (2)
42. South Petherton & Islemoor (2)
43. Street (2)
44. Taunton East (2)
45. Taunton North (2)
46. Taunton South (2)
47. Upper Tone (2)
48. Watchet & Stogursey (2)
49. Wellington (2)
50. Wells (2)
51. Wincanton & Bruton (2)
52. Yeovil Central (2)
53. Yeovil East (2)
54. Yeovil South (2)
55. Yeovil West (2)

== Former county councils ==
=== Avon ===
Electoral Divisions from 1 April 1974 (first election 12 April 1973) to 7 May 1981:

1. Axbridge No. 1 (1)
2. Axbridge No. 2 (1)
3. Bath No. 1 (1)
4. Bath No. 2 (1)
5. Bath No. 3 (1)
6. Bath No. 4 (1)
7. Bath No. 5 (1)
8. Bath No. 6 (1)
9. Bath No. 7 (1)
10. Bathavon No. 1 (1)
11. Bathavon No. 2 (1)
12. Bitton (1)
13. Bristol Avon (1)
14. Bristol Bedminster (1)
15. Bristol Bishopston (1)
16. Bristol Bishopsworth (1)
17. Bristol Brislington (1)
18. Bristol Cabot (1)
19. Bristol Clifton (1)
20. Bristol District (1)
21. Bristol Durdham (1)
22. Bristol Easton (1)
23. Bristol Eastville (1)
24. Bristol Henbury (2)
25. Bristol Hengrove (2)
26. Bristol Hillfields (1)
27. Bristol Horfield (1)
28. Bristol Knowle (1)
29. Bristol Redland (1)
30. Bristol Somerset (1)
31. Bristol Southmead (1)
32. Bristol Southville (1)
33. Bristol Ss Philip & Jacob (1)
34. Bristol St George East (1)
35. Bristol St George West (1)
36. Bristol St Paul (1)
37. Bristol Stapleton (2)
38. Bristol Stockwood (2)
39. Bristol Westbury-on-Trym (2)
40. Bristol Windmill Hill (1)
41. Clevedon (1)
42. Clutton No. 1 (1)
43. Clutton No. 2 (1)
44. Keynsham East (1)
45. Keynsham West (1)
46. Kingswood No. 1 (1)
47. Kingswood No. 2 (1)
48. Long Ashton No. 1 (1)
49. Long Ashton No. 2 (1)
50. Long Ashton No. 3 (1)
51. Mangotsfield No. 1 (1)
52. Mangotsfield No. 2 (1)
53. Norton/Radstock (1)
54. Portishead (1)
55. Siston (1)
56. Sodbury No. 1 (1)
57. Sodbury No. 2 (1)
58. Sodbury No. 3 (1)
59. Sodbury No. 4 (1)
60. Sodbury No. 5 (1)
61. Thornbury No. 1 (1)
62. Thornbury No. 2 (1)
63. Thornbury No. 3 (1)
64. Weston-super-Mare No. 1 (1)
65. Weston-super-Mare No. 2 (1)
66. Weston-super-Mare No. 3 (1)
67. Weston-super-Mare No. 4 (1)

Electoral Divisions from 7 May 1981 to 1 April 1996 (county abolished):

1. Ashley (1)
2. Avonmouth (1)
3. Bath Central (1)
4. Bath North East (1)
5. Bath North West (1)
6. Bath South (1)
7. Bath South East (1)
8. Bath South West (1)
9. Bath West (1)
10. Bathavon (1)
11. Bedminster (1)
12. Bishopston (1)
13. Bishopsworth (1)
14. Bitton (1)
15. Brislington East (1)
16. Brislington West (1)
17. Cabot (1)
18. Chew Valley (1)
19. Clevedon (1)
20. Clifton (1)
21. Cotham (1)
22. Downend (1)
23. Easton (1)
24. Eastville (1)
25. Filton (1)
26. Filwood (1)
27. Frome Vale (1)
28. Gordano Valley (1)
29. Hartcliffe (1)
30. Henbury (1)
31. Hengrove (1)
32. Henleaze (1)
33. Hillfields (1)
34. Horfield (1)
35. Keynsham East (1)
36. Keynsham West (1)
37. Kings Chase (1)
38. Kingsweston (1)
39. Knowle (1)
40. Ladden Brook (1)
41. Lawrence Hill (1)
42. Lockleaze (1)
43. Longwell Green (1)
44. Midsomer Norton (1)
45. Mount Hill (1)
46. Nailsea (1)
47. Patchway (1)
48. Portishead (1)
49. Priory (1)
50. Radstock (1)
51. Redland (1)
52. Rodway (1)
53. Severn Vale (1)
54. Siston (1)
55. Sodbury (1)
56. Southmead (1)
57. Southville (1)
58. St George East (1)
59. St George West (1)
60. Stockwood (1)
61. Stoke Bishop (1)
62. The Combe (1)
63. Thornbury (1)
64. Westbury-on-Trym (1)
65. Weston East (1)
66. Weston North (1)
67. Weston South (1)
68. Weston West (1)
69. Whitchurch Park (1)
70. Wick (1)
71. Windmill Hill (1)
72. Winscombe & Wrington Vale (1)
73. Winterbourne (1)
74. Worle (1)
75. Yate (1)
76. Yatton & Yeo Moor (1)

=== Somerset ===
Electoral Divisions from 1 April 1974 (first election 12 April 1973) to 7 May 1981:

1. Axbridge No. 1 (1)
2. Axbridge No. 2 (1)
3. Bridgwater (Central) (1)
4. Bridgwater (Eastover) (1)
5. Bridgwater (Westover) (1)
6. Bridgwater Rural No. 1 (1)
7. Bridgwater Rural No. 2 (Cannington) (1)
8. Bridgwater Rural No. 3 (North Petherton) (1)
9. Burnham-on-Sea No. 1 (1)
10. Burnham-on-Sea No. 2 (1)
11. Castle Cary (1)
12. Chard (1)
13. Coker (1)
14. Crewkerne (1)
15. Curry Rivel (1)
16. Dowlish Wake (1)
17. Dulverton (1)
18. Dunster (1)
19. Frome (North) (1)
20. Frome (South) (1)
21. Glastonbury (1)
22. Ilchester (2)
23. Ilminster (1)
24. Kilmersdon (1)
25. Langport (1)
26. Martock (1)
27. Milborne Port (1)
28. Milverton (1)
29. Minehead (1)
30. Nunney (1)
31. Shepton Mallet (1)
32. Shepton Mallet Rural No. 1 (1)
33. Shepton Mallet Rural No. 2 (Evercre (1)
34. Somerton (1)
35. Stogursey (1)
36. Street (1)
37. Taunton (East) (1)
38. Taunton (North) (1)
39. Taunton (Trinity) (1)
40. Taunton (West) (1)
41. Taunton (Wilton) (1)
42. Taunton Rural No. 1 (1)
43. Taunton Rural No. 2 (1)
44. Taunton Rural No. 3 (1)
45. Taunton Rural No. 4 (1)
46. Wellington (1)
47. Wells (1)
48. Wells Rural No. 1 (1)
49. Wells Rural No. 2 (Meare) (1)
50. Williton (1)
51. Wincanton (1)
52. Wiveliscombe (1)
53. Yeovil (North & East) (1)
54. Yeovil (South & Central) (1)
55. Yeovil (West & Preston) (1)

Electoral Divisions from 7 May 1981 to 7 June 2001:

1. Blackmoor Vale (1)
2. Brent (1)
3. Bridgwater East (1)
4. Bridgwater North (1)
5. Bridgwater South (1)
6. Bridgwater West (1)
7. Burnham-on-Sea (1)
8. Cannington (1)
9. Castle Cary (1)
10. Chard Town (1)
11. Cheddar (1)
12. Coker (1)
13. Crewkerne (1)
14. Curry Rivel (1)
15. Dowlish Wake (1)
16. Dulverton (1)
17. Dunster (1)
18. East Mendip (1)
19. East Shepton (1)
20. Frome North (1)
21. Frome South (1)
22. Glastonbury (1)
23. Highbridge (1)
24. Houndstone (1)
25. Huntspill (1)
26. Ilchester (1)
27. Ilminster (1)
28. Langport (1)
29. Lydeard (1)
30. Martock (1)
31. Mendip South West (1)
32. Mendip West (1)
33. Mid Tone (1)
34. Minehead (1)
35. North Curry (1)
36. North Mendip (1)
37. North Petherton (1)
38. Pitminster (1)
39. Poldens (1)
40. Quantock (1)
41. Shepton Mallet (1)
42. Somerton (1)
43. Staplegrove (1)
44. Street (1)
45. Taunton East (1)
46. Taunton Fairwater (1)
47. Taunton North (1)
48. Taunton South (1)
49. Taunton West (1)
50. Upper Tone (1)
51. Wellington (1)
52. Wells (1)
53. Williton (1)
54. Wincanton & Bruton (1)
55. Yeovil North & East (1)
56. Yeovil South & Central (1)
57. Yeovil West & Preston (1)

Electoral Divisions from 7 June 2001 to 2 May 2013:

1. Blackdown & Wellington East (1)
2. Blackmoor Vale (1)
3. Brent (1)
4. Bridgwater East & Bawdrip (1)
5. Bridgwater North & Central (1)
6. Bridgwater South (1)
7. Bridgwater West (1)
8. Burnham-on-Sea North (1)
9. Cannington (1)
10. Castle Cary (1)
11. Chard North (1)
12. Chard South (1)
13. Cheddar (1)
14. Coker (1)
15. Crewkerne (1)
16. Curry Rivel (1)
17. Dulverton & Exmoor (1)
18. Dunster (1)
19. Frome North (1)
20. Frome Selwood (1)
21. Frome South (1)
22. Glastonbury (1)
23. Highbridge & Burnham-on-Sea South (1)
24. Huntspill (1)
25. Ilchester (1)
26. Ilminster (1)
27. King Alfred (1)
28. Langport (1)
29. Lydeard (1)
30. Martock (1)
31. Mendip Central & East (1)
32. Mendip North East (1)
33. Mendip North West (1)
34. Mendip South (1)
35. Mendip West (1)
36. Minehead (1)
37. North Curry (1)
38. North Petherton (1)
39. Shepton Mallet (1)
40. Somerton (1)
41. South Petherton (1)
42. Staplegrove (1)
43. Street (1)
44. Taunton & Trull (1)
45. Taunton East (1)
46. Taunton Fairwater (1)
47. Taunton North (1)
48. Taunton South (1)
49. Taunton West (1)
50. Upper Tone (1)
51. Watchet & Quantocks (1)
52. Wellington (1)
53. Wells (1)
54. Wincanton & Bruton (1)
55. Yeovil East (1)
56. Yeovil North & Central (1)
57. Yeovil South (1)
58. Yeovil West (1)

Electoral Divisions from 2 May 2013 to 1 April 2023:

1. Bishop’s Hull & Taunton West (1)
2. Blackdown & Neroche (1)
3. Blackmoor Vale (1)
4. Brent (1)
5. Bridgwater East & Bawdrip (1)
6. Bridgwater North & Central (1)
7. Bridgwater South (1)
8. Bridgwater West (1)
9. Brympton (1)
10. Burnham North (1)
11. Cannington (1)
12. Castle Cary (1)
13. Chard North (1)
14. Chard South (1)
15. Cheddar (1)
16. Coker (1)
17. Comeytrowe & Trull (1)
18. Crewkerne (1)
19. Curry Rivel & Langport (1)
20. Dulverton & Exmoor (1)
21. Dunster (1)
22. Frome East (1)
23. Frome North (1)
24. Frome West (1)
25. Glastonbury & Street (2)
26. Highbridge & Burnham South (1)
27. Huntspill (1)
28. Ilminster (1)
29. King Alfred (1)
30. Lydeard (1)
31. Martock (1)
32. Mendip Central & East (1)
33. Mendip Hills (1)
34. Mendip South (1)
35. Mendip West (1)
36. Minehead (1)
37. Monkton & North Curry (1)
38. North Petherton (1)
39. Rowbarton & Staplegrove (1)
40. Shepton Mallet (1)
41. Somerton (1)
42. South Petherton & Islemoor (1)
43. Taunton East (1)
44. Taunton North (1)
45. Taunton South (1)
46. Upper Tone (1)
47. Watchet & Stogursey (1)
48. Wellington (1)
49. Wells (1)
50. Wincanton & Bruton (1)
51. Yeovil Central (1)
52. Yeovil East (1)
53. Yeovil South (1)
54. Yeovil West (1)

== Former district councils ==
=== Bath ===
Wards from 1 April 1974 (first election 7 June 1973) to 6 May 1976:

1. Abbey (3)
2. Bathwick (3)
3. Bloomfield (3)
4. Combe Down (3)
5. Kingsmead (3)
6. Lambridge (3)
7. Lansdown (3)
8. Lyncombe (3)
9. Newbridge (3)
10. Oldfield (3)
11. Twerton East (3)
12. Twerton West (3)
13. Walcot (3)
14. Westmoreland (3)
15. Widcombe (3)

Wards from 6 May 1976 to 1 April 1996 (district abolished):

1. Abbey (3)
2. Bathwick (3)
3. Bloomfield (3)
4. Combe Down (3)
5. Kingsmead (3)
6. Lambridge (3)
7. Lansdown (3)
8. Lyncombe (3)
9. Newbridge (3)
10. Oldfield (3)
11. Southdown (3)
12. Twerton (3)
13. Walcot (3)
14. Westmoreland (3)
15. Weston (3)
16. Widcombe (3)

=== Mendip ===
Wards from 1 April 1974 (first election 7 June 1973) to 3 May 1979:

Wards from 3 May 1979 to 6 May 1999:

Wards from 6 May 1999 to 3 May 2007:

1. Ashwick & Ston Easton (1)
2. Avalon (1)
3. Beacon (1)
4. Beckington & Rode (1)
5. Chilcompton (1)
6. Coleford (1)
7. Creech (1)
8. Frome Berkley Down (2)
9. Frome Fromefield (2)
10. Frome Keyford (2)
11. Frome Park (2)
12. Frome Welshmill (2)
13. Glastonbury St Benedict's (1)
14. Glastonbury St Edmund's (1)
15. Glastonbury St John's (1)
16. Glastonbury St Mary's (1)
17. Knowle (1)
18. Mells (1)
19. Moor (1)
20. Nedge (1)
21. Nordinton (1)
22. Postlebury (1)
23. Pylcombe (1)
24. Rodney & Priddy (1)
25. St Cuthbert (Out) North & West (1)
26. Shepton East (2)
27. Shepton West (2)
28. Stratton (1)
29. Street North (2)
30. Street South (2)
31. Street West (1)
32. Vale (1)
33. Wells Central (1)
34. Wells St Cuthbert's (2)
35. Wells St Thomas' (2)

Wards from 3 May 2007 to 1 April 2023:

1. Ammerdown (1)
2. Ashwick, Chilcompton & Stratton (2)
3. Beckington & Selwood (1)
4. Butleigh & Baltonsborough (1)
5. Chewton Mendip & Ston Easton (1)
6. Coleford & Holcombe (2)
7. Cranmore, Doulting & Nunney (1)
8. Creech (1)
9. Croscombe & Pilton (1)
10. Frome Berkley Down (2)
11. Frome College (2)
12. Frome Keyford (2)
13. Frome Market (2)
14. Frome Oakfield (1)
15. Frome Park (2)
16. Glastonbury St Benedict’s (1)
17. Glastonbury St Edmund’s (1)
18. Glastonbury St John’s (1)
19. Glastonbury St Mary’s (1)
20. Moor (1)
21. Postlebury (1)
22. Rode & Norton St Philip (1)
23. Rodney & Westbury (1)
24. Shepton East (2)
25. Shepton West (2)
26. St Cuthbert Out North (1)
27. Street North (2)
28. Street South (2)
29. Street West (1)
30. The Pennards & Ditcheat (1)
31. Wells Central (1)
32. Wells St Cuthbert’s (2)
33. Wells St Thomas’ (2)
34. Wookey & St Cuthbert Out West (1)

=== Sedgemoor ===
Wards from 1 April 1974 (first election 7 June 1973) to 3 May 1979:

Wards from 3 May 1979 to 6 May 1999:

Wards from 6 May 1999 to 5 May 2011:

1. Axbridge (1)
2. Axe Vale (1)
3. Berrow (1)
4. Brent North (1)
5. Bridgwater Bower (3)
6. Bridgwater Eastover (2)
7. Bridgwater Hamp (3)
8. Bridgwater Quantock (3)
9. Bridgwater Sydenham (3)
10. Bridgwater Victoria (2)
11. Burnham North (3)
12. Burnham South (3)
13. Cannington & Quantocks (3)
14. Cheddar & Shipham (3)
15. East Poldens (1)
16. Highbridge (3)
17. Huntspill & Pawlett (2)
18. King’s Isle (2)
19. Knoll (1)
20. North Petherton (3)
21. Puriton (1)
22. Sandford (1)
23. Wedmore & Mark (2)
24. West Poldens (1)
25. Woolavington (1)

Wards from 5 May 2011 to 1 April 2023:

1. Axevale (2)
2. Berrow (1)
3. Bridgwater Dunwear (2)
4. Bridgwater Eastover (2)
5. Bridgwater Fairfax (3)
6. Bridgwater Hamp (2)
7. Bridgwater Victoria (2)
8. Bridgwater Westover (2)
9. Bridgwater Wyndham (2)
10. Burnham Central (3)
11. Burnham North (3)
12. Cannington & Wembdon (2)
13. Cheddar & Shipham (3)
14. East Polden (1)
15. Highbridge & Burnham Marine (3)
16. Huntspill & Pawlett (1)
17. King’s Isle (2)
18. Knoll (2)
19. North Petherton (3)
20. Puriton & Woolavington (2)
21. Quantocks (2)
22. Wedmore & Mark (2)
23. West Polden (1)

=== Somerset West and Taunton ===
Wards from 2 May 2019 to 1 April 2023:

1. Alcombe (1)
2. Blackbrook & Holway (2)
3. Comeytrowe & Bishop's Hull (3)
4. Cotford St Luke & Oake (1)
5. Creech St Michael (2)
6. Dulverton & District (1)
7. Exmoor (1)
8. Halcon & Lane (2)
9. Hatch & Blackdown (1)
10. Manor & Tangier (1)
11. Milverton & District (1)
12. Minehead Central (2)
13. Minehead North (1)
14. Monument (1)
15. North Curry & Ruishton (2)
16. North Town (1)
17. Norton Fitzwarren & Stapelgrove (3)
18. Old Cleeve & District (2)
19. Periton & Woodcombe (1)
20. Porlock & District (1)
21. Priorswood (3)
22. Quantock Vale (1)
23. Rockwell Green (1)
24. South Quantock (2)
25. Trull, Pitminster & Corfe (2)
26. Victoria (2)
27. Vivary (2)
28. Watchet & Williton (3)
29. Wellington East (2)
30. Wellington North (2)
31. Wellington South (1)
32. Wellsprings & Rowbarton (2)
33. West Monkton & Cheddon Fitzpaine (3)
34. Wilton & Sherford (1)
35. Wiveliscombe & District (2)

=== South Somerset ===
Wards from 1 April 1974 (first election 7 June 1973) to 6 May 1976:

Wards from 6 May 1976 to 2 May 1991:

Wards from 2 May 1991 to 6 May 1999:

1. Blackdown (1)
2. Blackmoor Vale (2)
3. Brue (2)
4. Burrow Hill (1)
5. Camelot (1)
6. Cary (2)
7. Chard Avishayes (1)
8. Chard Combe (1)
9. Chard Crimchard (1)
10. Chard Holyrood (1)
11. Chard Jocelyn (1)
12. Coker (2)
13. Crewkerne (3)
14. Curry Rivel (1)
15. Eggwood (1)
16. Hamdon (1)
17. Houndstone (1)
18. Ilminster (2)
19. Islemoor (1)
20. Ivelchester (1)
21. Langport & Huish (1)
22. Martock (2)
23. Milborne Port (1)
24. Mudford (1)
25. Neroche (1)
26. Northstone (1)
27. Parrett (1)
28. St Michael's (1)
29. South Petherton (2)
30. Tatworth & Forton (1)
31. Turn Hill (1)
32. Wessex (2)
33. Wincanton (2)
34. Windwhistle (1)
35. Yeovil Central (3)
36. Yeovil East (3)
37. Yeovil Preston (2)
38. Yeovil South (2)
39. Yeovil West (2)
40. Yeovil Without (3)

Wards from 6 May 1999 to 2 May 2019:

1. Blackdown (1)
2. Blackmoor Vale (2)
3. Bruton (1)
4. Brympton (2)
5. Burrow Hill (1)
6. Camelot (1)
7. Cary (2)
8. Chard Avishayes (1)
9. Chard Combe (1)
10. Chard Crimchard (1)
11. Chard Holyrood (1)
12. Chard Jocelyn (1)
13. Coker (2)
14. Crewkerne (3)
15. Curry Rivel (1)
16. Eggwood (1)
17. Hamdon (1)
18. Ilminster (2)
19. Islemoor (1)
20. Ivelchester (1)
21. Langport & Huish (1)
22. Martock (2)
23. Milborne Port (1)
24. Neroche (1)
25. Northstone (1)
26. Parrett (1)
27. St Michael's (1)
28. South Petherton (2)
29. Tatworth & Forton (1)
30. Tower (1)
31. Turn Hill (1)
32. Wessex (2)
33. Wincanton (2)
34. Windwhistle (1)
35. Yeovil Central (3)
36. Yeovil East (3)
37. Yeovil South (3)
38. Yeovil West (3)
39. Yeovil Without (3)

Wards from 2 May 2019 to 1 April 2023:

1. Blackdown & Tatworth (2)
2. Blackmoor Vale (2)
3. Bruton (1)
4. Brympton (3)
5. Burrow Hill (1)
6. Camelot (1)
7. Cary (2)
8. Chard Avishayes (1)
9. Chard Combe (1)
10. Chard Crimchard (1)
11. Chard Holyrood (1)
12. Chard Jocelyn (1)
13. Coker (2)
14. Crewkerne (3)
15. Curry Rivel, Huish & Langport (2)
16. Eggwood (1)
17. Hamdon (1)
18. Ilminster (2)
19. Islemoor (1)
20. Martock (2)
21. Milborne Port (1)
22. Northstone, Ivelchester & St Michael's (3)
23. Parrett (1)
24. South Petherton (2)
25. Tower (1)
26. Turn Hill (1)
27. Wessex (2)
28. Wincanton (2)
29. Windwhistle (1)
30. Yeovil College (3)
31. Yeovil Lyde (2)
32. Yeovil Summerlands (3)
33. Yeovil Westland (3)
34. Yeovil Without (3)

=== Taunton Deane ===
Wards from 1 April 1974 (first election 7 June 1973) to 3 May 1979:

Wards from 3 May 1979 to 6 May 1999:

Wards from 6 May 1999 to 3 May 2007:

1. Bishop's Hull (2)
2. Bishops Lydeard (2)
3. Blackdown (1)
4. Bradford on Tone (1)
5. Comeytrowe (3)
6. Milverton & North Deane (2)
7. Monument (1)
8. Neroche (1)
9. North Curry (1)
10. Norton Fitzwarren (1)
11. Ruishton & Creech (2)
12. Staplegrove (2)
13. Stoke St Gregory (1)
14. Taunton Blackbrook & Holway (3)
15. Taunton Eastgate (2)
16. Taunton Fairwater (3)
17. Taunton Halcon (3)
18. Taunton Killams & Mountfield (2)
19. Taunton Lyngford (3)
20. Taunton Manor & Wilton (3)
21. Taunton Pyrland & Rowbarton (3)
22. Trull (1)
23. Wellington East (2)
24. Wellington North (2)
25. Wellington Rockwell Green & West (3)
26. West Monkton (2)
27. Wiveliscombe & West Deane (2)

Wards from 3 May 2007 to 2 May 2019 (district abolished):

1. Bishop’s Hull (2)
2. Bishop’s Lydeard (3)
3. Blackdown (1)
4. Bradford-on-Tone (1)
5. Comeytrowe (3)
6. Milverton & North Deane (1)
7. Monument (1)
8. Neroche (1)
9. North Curry & Stoke St Gregory (2)
10. Norton Fitzwarren (2)
11. Ruishton & Creech (2)
12. Staplegrove (2)
13. Taunton Blackbrook & Holway (3)
14. Taunton Eastgate (2)
15. Taunton Fairwater (3)
16. Taunton Halcon (3)
17. Taunton Killams & Mountfield (2)
18. Taunton Lyngford (3)
19. Taunton Manor & Wilton (3)
20. Taunton Pyrland & Rowbarton (3)
21. Trull (1)
22. Wellington East (2)
23. Wellington North (2)
24. Wellington Rockwell Green & West (3)
25. West Monkton (3)
26. Wiveliscombe & West Deane (2)

=== Wansdyke ===
Wards from 1 April 1974 (first election 7 June 1973) to 6 May 1976:

1. Bathampton (1)
2. Batheaston (2)
3. Bathford (1)
4. Cameley (1)
5. Camerton (1)
6. Charlcombe (1)
7. Chew Magna (1)
8. Chew Stoke (1)
9. Clutton (1)
10. Compton Dando (1)
11. Farmborough (1)
12. Freshford (1)
13. High Littleton (1)
14. Hinton Charterhouse (1)
15. Keynsham Central (2)
16. Keynsham East (2)
17. Keynsham North (2)
18. Keynsham South (3)
19. Keynsham West (3)
20. Midsomer Norton (3)
21. Newton St Loe (1)
22. Paulton (2)
23. Peasedown St John (2)
24. Publow (1)
25. Radstock (3)
26. Stowey Sutton (1)
27. The Hartprees (1)
28. Timsbury (1)
29. Westfield (3)

Wards from 6 May 1976 to 1 April 1996 (district abolished):

1. Bathampton (1)
2. Batheaston (2)
3. Bathford (1)
4. Cameley (1)
5. Camerton (1)
6. Charlcombe (1)
7. Chew Magna (1)
8. Chew Stoke (1)
9. Clutton (1)
10. Compton Dando (1)
11. Farmborough (1)
12. Freshford (1)
13. Hartprees (1)
14. High Littleton (1)
15. Hinton Charterhouse (1)
16. Keynsham East (3)
17. Keynsham North (2)
18. Keynsham South (3)
19. Keynsham West (3)
20. Midsomer Norton North (2)
21. Midsomer Norton Redfield (2)
22. Newton St Loe (1)
23. Paulton (3)
24. Peasedown St John (2)
25. Publow (1)
26. Radstock (3)
27. Saltford (2)
28. Stowey Sutton (1)
29. Timsbury (1)
30. Westfield (3)

=== West Somerset ===
Wards from 1 April 1974 (first election 7 June 1973) to 3 May 1979:

Wards from 3 May 1979 to 6 May 1999:

Wards from 6 May 1999 to 5 May 2011:

1. Alcombe East (2)
2. Alcombe West (2)
3. Aville Vale (1)
4. Brompton Ralph & Haddon (1)
5. Carhampton & Withycombe (1)
6. Crowcombe & Stogumber (1)
7. Dulverton & Brushford (2)
8. Dunster (1)
9. Exmoor (1)
10. Minehead North (3)
11. Minehead South (3)
12. Old Cleeve (2)
13. Porlock & District (2)
14. Quantock Vale (2)
15. Quarme (1)
16. Watchet (3)
17. West Quantock (1)
18. Williton (2)

Wards from 5 May 2011 to 2 May 2019 (district abolished):

1. Alcombe (2)
2. Brendon Hills (1)
3. Carhampton & Withycombe (1)
4. Crowcombe & Stogumber (1)
5. Dulverton & District (2)
6. Dunster & Timberscombe (1)
7. Greater Exmoor (1)
8. Minehead Central (3)
9. Minehead North (2)
10. Minehead South (2)
11. Old Cleeve (2)
12. Porlock & District (2)
13. Quantock Vale (2)
14. Watchet (3)
15. West Quantock (1)
16. Williton (2)

=== Woodspring ===
Wards from 1 April 1974 (first election 7 June 1973) to 3 May 1979:

Wards from 3 May 1979 to 1 April 1996 (district abolished):

== Electoral wards by constituency ==
Wards as they existed on 1 December 2020.

=== Bath ===
Bath and North East Somerset: Bathavon North; Bathwick; Combe Down; Kingsmead; Lambridge; Lansdown; Moorlands; Newbridge; Odd Down; Oldfield Park; Southdown; Twerton; Walcot; Westmoreland; Weston; Widcombe & Lyncombe.

=== Bridgwater ===
Sedgemoor: Berrow; Bridgwater Dunwear; Bridgwater Eastover; Bridgwater Fairfax; Bridgwater Hamp; Bridgwater Victoria; Bridgwater Westover; Bridgwater Wyndham; Burnham Central; Burnham North; Cannington & Wembdon; Highbridge & Burnham Marine; Huntspill & Pawlett; King’s Isle; North Petherton; Puriton & Woolavington; Quantocks.

=== Frome and East Somerset ===
Bath and North East Somerset: Bathavon South; Midsomer Norton North; Midsomer Norton Redfield; Peasedown; Radstock; Westfield.

Mendip: Ammerdown; Ashwick, Chilcompton & Stratton; Beckington & Selwood; Coleford & Holcombe; Cranmore, Doulting & Nunney; Creech; Frome Berkley Down; Frome College; Frome Keyford; Frome Market; Frome Oakfield; Frome Park; Postlebury; Rode & Norton St. Philip; The Pennards & Ditcheat.

=== Glastonbury and Somerton ===
Mendip: Butleigh & Baltonsborough; Glastonbury St. Benedict’s; Glastonbury St. Edmund’s; Glastonbury St. John’s; Glastonbury St. Mary’s; Street North; Street South; Street West.

South Somerset: Blackmoor Vale; Bruton; Burrow Hill; Camelot; Cary; Curry Rivel, Huish & Langport; Hamdon; Islemoor; Martock; Milborne Port; Northstone, Ivelchester & St. Michael’s; Tower; Turn Hill; Wessex; Wincanton.

=== North East Somerset and Hanham (part) ===
Bath and North East Somerset: Chew Valley; Clutton & Farmborough; High Littleton; Keynsham East; Keynsham North; Keynsham South; Mendip; Paulton; Publow & Whitchurch; Saltford; Timsbury.

=== North Somerset ===
North Somerset: Backwell; Clevedon East; Clevedon South; Clevedon Walton; Clevedon West; Clevedon Yeo; Gordano Valley; Long Ashton; Nailsea Golden Valley; Nailsea West End; Nailsea Yeo; Nailsea Youngwood; Pill; Portishead East; Portishead North; Portishead South; Portishead West; Winford; Wrington.

=== Taunton and Wellington ===
Somerset West and Taunton: Blackbrook & Holway; Comeytrowe & Bishop’s Hull; Creech St. Michael; Halcon & Lane; Hatch & Blackdown; Manor & Tangier; Monument; North Curry & Ruishton; North Town; Norton Fitzwarren & Staplegrove; Priorswood; Rockwell Green; Trull, Pitminster & Corfe; Victoria; Vivary; Wellington East; Wellington North; Wellington South; Wellsprings & Rowbarton; West Monkton & Cheddon Fitzpaine; Wilton & Sherford.

=== Tiverton and Minehead (part) ===
Somerset West and Taunton: Alcombe; Cotford St. Luke & Oake; Dulverton & District; Exmoor; Milverton & District; Minehead Central; Minehead North; Old Cleeve & District; Periton & Woodcombe; Porlock & District; Quantock Vale; South Quantock; Watchet & Williton; Wiveliscombe & District.

=== Wells and Mendip Hills ===
Mendip: Chewton Mendip & Ston Easton; Croscombe & Pilton; Moor; Rodney & Westbury; St. Cuthbert Out North; Shepton East; Shepton West; Wells Central; Wells St. Cuthbert’s; Wells St. Thomas’; Wookey & St. Cuthbert Out West.

North Somerset: Banwell & Winscombe; Blagdon & Churchill; Congresbury & Puxton; Yatton.

Sedgemoor: Axevale; Cheddar & Shipham; East Polden; Knoll; Wedmore & Mark; West Polden.

=== Weston-Super-Mare ===
North Somerset: Hutton & Locking; Weston-super-Mare Central; Weston-super-Mare Hillside; Weston-super-Mare Kewstoke; Weston-super-Mare Mid Worle; Weston-super-Mare Milton; Weston-super-Mare North Worle; Weston-super-Mare South; Weston-super-Mare South Worle; Weston-super-Mare Uphill; Weston-super-Mare Winterstoke; Wick St. Lawrence & St. Georges.

=== Yeovil ===
South Somerset: Blackdown & Tatworth; Brympton; Chard Avishayes; Chard Combe; Chard Crimchard; Chard Holyrood; Chard Jocelyn; Coker; Crewkerne; Eggwood; Ilminster; Neroche; Parrett; South Petherton; Windwhistle; Yeovil College; Yeovil Lyde; Yeovil Summerlands; Yeovil Westland; Yeovil Without.

== See also ==
- List of parliamentary constituencies in Somerset
