= Abbey, Bath =

Former electoral ward in Bath, England

Coordinates: 51.38°N 2.36°W

Abbey
- Location within Somerset
- OS grid reference: ST750650
- Unitary authority: Bath and North East Somerset
- Ceremonial county: Somerset
- Region: South West
- Country: England
- Sovereign state: United Kingdom
- Post town: BATH
- Postcode district: BA1
- Dialling code: 01225
- Police: Avon and Somerset
- Fire: Avon
- Ambulance: South Western
- UK Parliament: Bath

Abbey was an electoral ward covering the centre of Bath, England. It was abolished as part of the boundary changes effected at the elections held on 2 May 2019.

Abbey is rarely used as the name of an area of Bath, and was primarily used solely for electoral purposes within the Bath and North East Somerset unitary authority; it elected two councillors.

St John's Catholic Primary School is located on the eastern edge of the former ward.

The electoral wards surrounding the ward were Lansdown and Walcot to the north, Bathwick to the east, Widcombe to the south, and Kingsmead to the west.

== Notable places ==
Some notable places within the former ward are:

- Assembly Rooms
- Bath Abbey
- The Circus
- Grand Pump Room
- Guildhall
- Pulteney Bridge
- Recreation Ground
- Roman Baths
- Thermae Bath Spa
