= Widdecombe =

Widdecombe, Widecombe, Widdicombe, Widdicomb, or Widcombe may refer to:

== Arts and entertainment ==
- Widecombe Fair (film), a 1928 silent comedy
- Widecombe Fair (song), a 19th-century folk song

== People ==
- Ann Widdecombe (1947–2026), British politician and television personality
- Angus Widdicombe (born 1994), Australian rower
- Danny Widdicombe (fl. since 1997), Australian jazz musician
- David Widdicombe (filmmaker) (born 1962), Canadian filmmaker and playwright
- Josh Widdicombe (born 1983), English stand-up comedian
- Richard Widcombe (fl. 1413–1431), English politician
- Timothy Widdicombe (born 1990), Australian rower

== Places in England ==
- Widcombe, Bath, a suburb
  - Widcombe Crescent, Bath, a terrace of Georgian houses
  - Widcombe Manor House, a Georgian house
- Widecombe in the Moor, a village on Dartmoor, Devon

== Other uses ==
- Widecombe Fair, an event on Dartmoor, England
- Widdicomb Furniture Company, an American manufacturer (1858–2002)
