= Locksbrook =

Area of Bath, England

Coordinates: 51°23′00″N 02°23′25″W

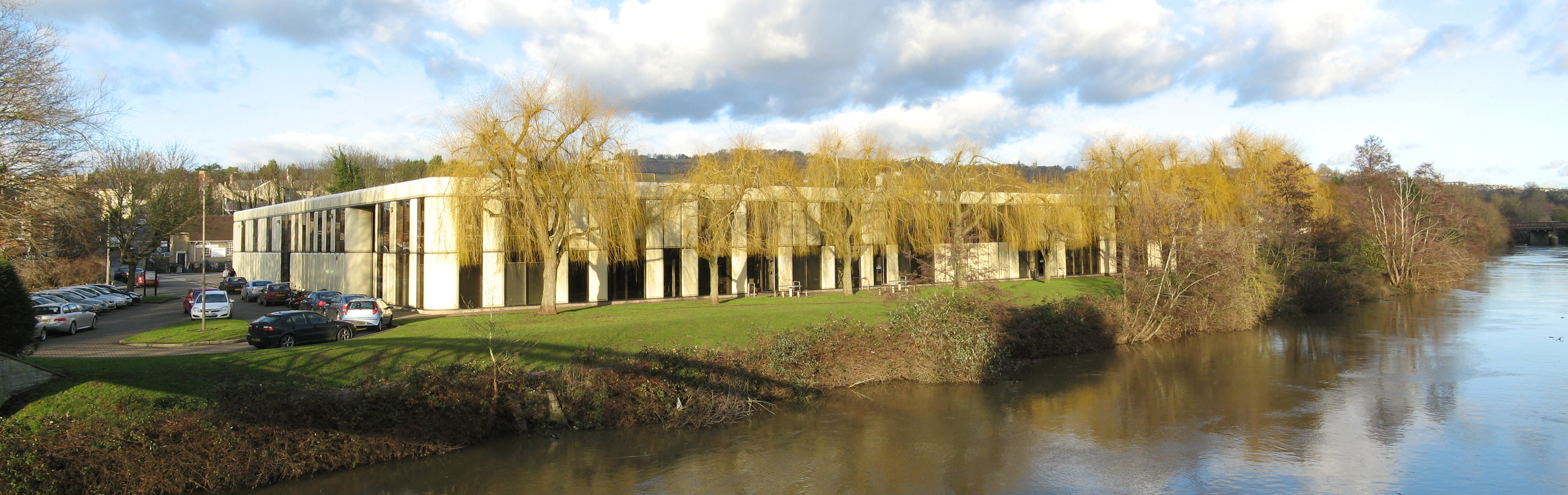
The Herman Miller factory in 2011, now the Bath School of Art and Design

Locksbrook is a light industrial and residential area in the west of Bath, England, in Newbridge ward.

Locksbrook lies on the north bank of the River Avon and is, effectively, the area between the river and the former Mangotsfield and Bath railway line. Twerton footbridge (or Fielding's Bridge) crosses the Avon and connects the area with Twerton, replacing an old rope ferry in 1894. Lock number 6, the highest of the Avon River Navigation, is also to be found there.

Locksbrook is the location of Locksbrook Cemetery, the resting place of several notable people.

In 2016, Bath Spa University purchased the former Herman Miller furniture factory in Locksbrook, a modern riverside listed building designed by Nicholas Grimshaw and Farrell & Grimshaw and built in 1976, to become the new home of the Bath School of Art and Design. The building used a flexible movable panel design and won several awards, including the Financial Times Industrial Architecture Award for 1977 and the RIBA South West Award in 1978. Detailed redevelopment plans are being drawn up in 2017 for it to become the new home of the Bath School of Art and Design.

Prior to ward boundary changes effected at the elections held on 2 May 2019, Locksbrook straddled the electoral wards of Newbridge and Kingsmead.
