= Westmoreland, Bath =

Electoral ward in Bath, United Kingdom

Coordinates: 51.379°N 2.37°W

Westmoreland
- Location within Somerset
- Population: 6,469 (2011)
- OS grid reference: ST744644
- Unitary authority: Bath and North East Somerset
- Ceremonial county: Somerset
- Region: South West
- Country: England
- Sovereign state: United Kingdom
- Post town: BATH
- Postcode district: BA2
- Dialling code: 01225
- Police: Avon and Somerset
- Fire: Avon
- Ambulance: South Western
- UK Parliament: Bath

Westmoreland is an area and electoral ward in the south-west of Bath, England. Although still shown on some Ordnance Survey mapping, Westmoreland is rarely used by residents as the name of an area of Bath, and is primarily used for electoral purposes within the Bath and North East Somerset unitary authority, electing two councillors.

The name Westmoreland is probably derived from the house, Westmoreland Place (see 1818 and 1852 maps of Bath), that stood approximately where Westmoreland Street is today.

Boundary changes for the electoral wards in Bath most recently took place at the May 2019 elections; Westmoreland remained a ward but with altered boundaries. At that election, Westmoreland elected two independents, and was the only ward in the city not to return Liberal Democrats.

Confusingly Westmoreland Street, Westmoreland Drive and Westmoreland Road, as well as the former Westmoreland goods station which closed in 1967, are not in the present-day ward, but about half a kilometre away in Oldfield Park ward.

Conversely, Oldfield Park railway station and a part of the Oldfield Park residential area, including Moorland Road which is a shopping district, is located in Westmoreland ward. Also in the ward is East Twerton and the one end of the Two Tunnels Greenway.

The wards surrounding Westmoreland ward are: Oldfield Park to the east, Moorlands and Southdown to the south, Twerton to the west, and Newbridge and Kingsmead to the north over the River Avon, which forms the ward's northern boundary.

Westmoreland has a considerable student population, from the University of Bath and Bath Spa University, both in private rental, and for Bath Spa University students accommodation blocks on former industrial land by the River Avon.
