= Kingsmead, Bath =

Electoral ward in Bath, United Kingdom

Coordinates: 51.383°N 2.368°W

Kingsmead
- ward Bath and North East Somerset Council
- County: Somerset
- Population: 6,553 (in 2021)

Current ward
- Created: 1974
- Councillor: None
- UK Parliament constituency: Bath

Kingsmead is an electoral ward within Bath, England, which encompasses most of the city centre and stretches west along the A4 to meet Newbridge and Weston wards. The population at the 2021 census was 6,553. The ward elects two councillors to the Bath and North East Somerset unitary authority.

Kingsmead is rarely used as the name of an area of Bath, and is primarily used for electoral purposes. The ward stretches about 1 mile (1.6 km) westward from the city centre, straddling the A4 road north of the River Avon. The ward is separated by the large Royal Victoria Park into two parts: a city centre eastern end, and a western residential end known as Lower Weston.

A boundary review in 2018, which came into force at the May 2019 local elections, abolished Abbey ward and extended Kingsmead eastwards as far as the Avon to include most of the city centre. At the same time the ward's western extent was slightly reduced, in order to move the Chelsea Road shopping street wholly into Newbridge ward.

Residents in the western end of the ward often use the facilities, such as schools, of the neighbouring Newbridge and Weston wards, and associate themselves with these localities.

The closed Mangotsfield and Bath branch line formerly ran from Green Park station, now a shopping area, in the ward. The Bristol and Bath Railway Path runs through the ward, but its route is alongside the River Avon since the former railway track has been built over just south of the ward.

The electoral wards surrounding the ward are Newbridge to the west, Weston and Lansdown to the north, Walcot and Bathwick to the east, and Widcombe & Lyncombe, Oldfield Park and Westmoreland to the south over the River Avon.

== Notable places ==
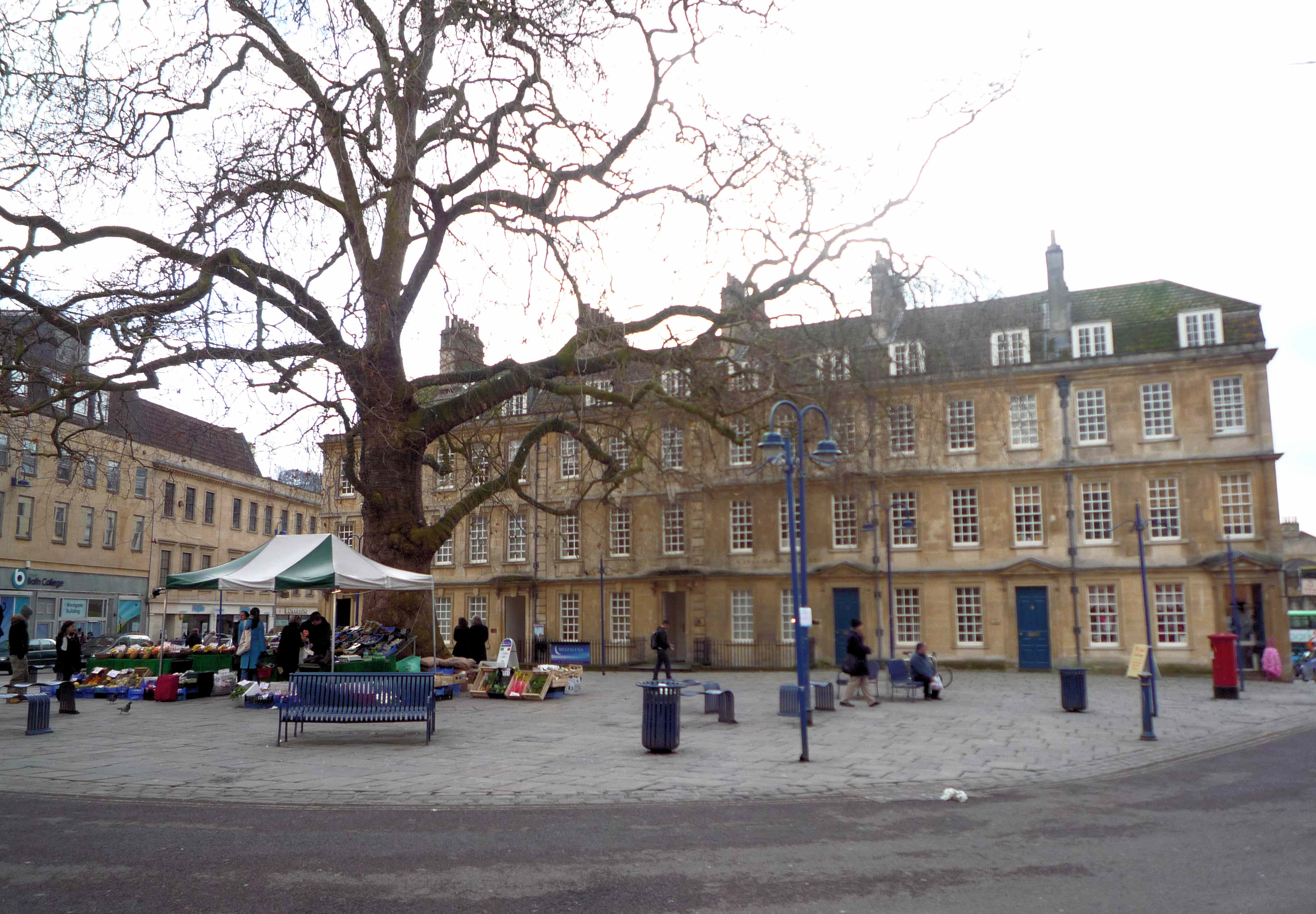
Kingsmead Square, after which the ward is named, is at the eastern end of the ward

Notable places within the ward, from east to west, include:

- SouthGate shopping centre
- Guildhall
- Bath Abbey
- Roman Baths
- Theatre Royal
- Kingsmead Square
- Queen Square
- Bath Royal Literary and Scientific Institution
- The Circus
- Herschel Museum of Astronomy
- Royal Crescent
- Norfolk Crescent
- Royal Victoria Park and Botanical Gardens
