= 2019 Bath and North East Somerset Council election =

2019 local election in Bath and North East Somerset

- 2 May 2019

All 59 seats to Bath and North East Somerset Council 30 seats needed for a majority
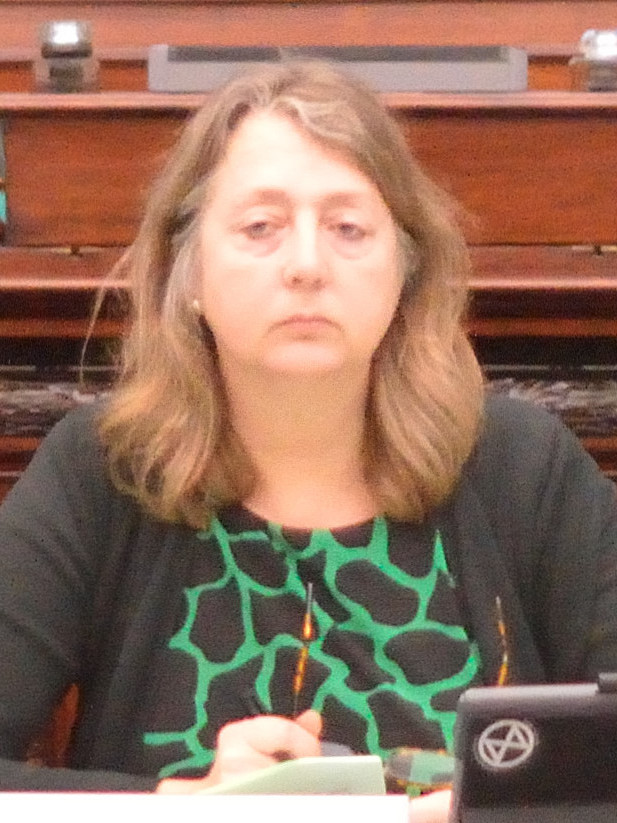
	First party	Second party
		Con
Leader	Dine Romero	Tim Warren
Party	Liberal Democrats	Conservative
Leader's seat	Southdown	Mendip (defeated)
Last election	15 seats, 25.0%	37 seats, 37.5%
Seats won	37	11
Seat change	▲22	▼26
Popular vote	42,682	24,460
Percentage	43.7%	25.0%
Swing	▲18.7%	▼12.5%
	Third party	Fourth party
	Ind	Lab
Leader	N/A	Robin Moss
Party	Independent	Labour
Leader's seat	N/A	Westfield
Last election	3 seats, 5.6%	6 seats, 14.6%
Seats won	6	5
Seat change	▲3	▼1
Popular vote	5,308	12,340
Percentage	5.4%	12.6%
Swing	▼0.2%	▼2.0%
- Map showing the results of the 2019 Bath and North East Somerset Council elections. Blue showing Conservative, Red showing Labour, Yellow showing Liberal Democrats and Grey showing Independents. Striped wards have mixed representation.
Council control before election
Conservative
Council control after election
Liberal Democrats

The 2019 Bath and North East Somerset Council election was held on 2 May 2019 to elect members of Bath and North East Somerset Council in England.

The Liberal Democrats took control of the council in 2019, winning thirty-seven seats with a working majority of seven.

== Background ==
Bath and North East Somerset Council held local elections on 2 May 2019 along with councils across England as part of the 2019 local elections. The council elects its members in all-out elections, with all its councillors up for election every four years. Councillors defending their seats in this election were previously elected in 2015. In that election, thirty-seven Conservative councillors, fifteen Liberal Democrat councillors, six Labour councillors, five independent councillors and two Green councillors were elected. In subsequent by-elections, the Liberal Democrats gained one seat from the Conservatives and one seat from the Green Party. Conservative councillor Martin Veal resigned from his party in March 2019 to run as an independent after his party did not select him as a candidate.

Following the 2015 election, the council was controlled by the Conservative Party, although previously the council had been under no overall control since its creation in 1996. In the New Statesman, the journalist Stephen Bush wrote that if the Conservatives maintained control of Bath and North East Somerset in 2019, it would represent a strong national performance for the party. Conservative peer Robert Hayward predicted that the Liberal Democrats would gain several seats on the council from the Conservatives due to a "Brexit penalty".

A boundary change in 2018 meant that the number of councillors fell to 59 from the 65 under previous boundaries, and the number of electoral wards reduced from 37 to 33. Most retained electoral wards have their boundaries adjusted so the number of electors per councillor is roughly similar.

The election was contested by full slates of Conservatives and Liberal Democrats, with 49 Labour candidates, 29 Green Party candidates, 12 independent candidates (including one candidate with no description), 11 candidates for the Bath North East Somerset Independent Group, and five UK Independence Party candidates. Two of the independent councillors re-elected in 2019 identified as "No politics, just Peasedown" when elected in 2015.

=== Retiring councillors ===
Council Ward	Departing Councillor	Party	Ref
Abbey	Lizzie Gladwyn	Conservative	
Bathavon North	Alison Millar	Liberal Democrats	
Bathwick	Matt Cochrane	Conservative	
Bathwick	Steve Jeffries	Conservative	
Chew Valley North	Liz Richardson	Conservative	
Combe Down	Cherry Beath	Liberal Democrats	
Keynsham East	Marie Longstaff	Conservative	
Keynsham East	Bryan Organ	Conservative	
Keynsham North	Charles Gerrish	Conservative	
Lambridge	Lin Patterson	Green	
Lansdown	Tony Clarke	Conservative	
Lyncombe	Michael Norton	Conservative	
Midsomer Norton North	Barry Macrae	Conservative	
Newbridge	Caroline Roberts	Liberal Democrats	
Oldfield	Will Sandry	Liberal Democrats	
Odd Down	Nigel Roberts	Liberal Democrats	
Saltford	Francine Haeberling	Conservative	
Twerton	Joe Rayment	Labour	
Walcot	Fiona Darey	Conservative	
Weston	Colin Barrett	Conservative	
Widcombe	Ian Gilchrist	Liberal Democrats	

== Council composition ==
After the previous election the composition of the council was:

↓
37	15	6	3	2	2
Con	LD	Lab	I	G	V

Prior to the election the composition of the council was:

↓
35	17	6	6	1
Con	LD	Lab	I	G

After the election the composition of the council was:

↓
37	11	6	5
LD	Con	I	Lab

== Results summary ==
Bath and North East Somerset Council election, 2019
Party	Candidates						Votes		
Party	Stood	Elected	Gained	Unseated	Net	% of total	%	No.	Net %
Liberal Democrats	59	37	–	–	▲22	62.7%	43.7%	42,682	▲18.7%
Conservative	59	11	–	–	▼26	18.6%	25.0%	24,460	▼12.5%
Independent	12	6	–	–	▲3	10.2%	5.4%	5,308	▼0.2%
Labour	49	5	–	–	▼1	8.5%	12.6%	12,340	▼2%
Green	29	0	–	–	▼2	0%	9.3%	9,114	▼4%
BIG	11	0	–	–	Steady	0%	2.9%	2,854	N/A
UKIP	5	0	–	–	Steady	0%	1.0%	998	▼1.8%

== Ward results ==
As the wards were newly created, comparisons with previous elections are not possible. All percentages are calculated as the proportion of valid votes won by each councillor.

Sitting councillors are marked with an asterisk (*).

=== Bathavon North ===
Bathavon North (2 seats)
Party	Candidate	Votes	%	±%
Liberal Democrats	Elizabeth Sarah Warren	1,373	50.4	
Liberal Democrats	Kevin Ronald Guy	1,222	44.9	
Conservative	Geoff Ward *	658	24.2	
Conservative	Neil Auty	575	21.1	
Green	Leila Jane Froud	385	14.1	
BIG	Emma Adams	307	11.3	
BIG	Andrew Lea	273	10.0	
Independent	Martin John Beresford Veal *	269	9.9	
Labour Co-op	Vicky Drew	157	5.8	
Labour	Cydney Hippisley-Drew	88	3.2	
Turnout		2,737	51.6	
Registered electors		5,301		
Rejected ballots		14	0.5	
Liberal Democrats gain from Conservative		Swing		
Liberal Democrats gain from Conservative		Swing		

=== Bathavon South ===
Bathavon South (2 seats)
Party	Candidate	Votes	%	±%
Liberal Democrats	Trelawny Neilson Butters *	1,121	53.1	
Liberal Democrats	Matthew David McCabe	901	42.7	
Conservative	Paul Gerald Mallon	494	23.4	
Conservative	Rosemary Naish	474	22.5	
Green	Terry Pitt	406	19.3	
BIG	Lisa Tilesi	239	11.3	
No party description	David Veale *	154	7.3	
Labour	Alexander McCabe	149	7.1	
Turnout		2,116	50.9	
Registered electors		4,161		
Rejected ballots		7	0.3	
Liberal Democrats hold		Swing		
Liberal Democrats win (new seat)				

=== Bathwick ===
Bathwick (2 seats)
Party	Candidate	Votes	%	±%
Liberal Democrats	Manda Rigby	1,183	53.1	
Liberal Democrats	Yukteshwar Kumar	1,077	48.4	
Conservative	Tom Hobson	586	26.3	
Conservative	Martin Reynold Roberto Grixoni	558	25.1	
Green	Michael Coffey	348	15.6	
BIG	Evan Gregg Rudowski	278	12.5	
Labour	Johanna Maj Everritt	134	6.0	
Labour	Owen John Biggadike	125	5.6	
Independent	Elie Jacques Charles Breton Des Loys	37	1.7	
Turnout		2,237	46.2	
Registered electors		4,843		
Rejected ballots		11	0.5	
Liberal Democrats gain from Conservative		Swing		
Liberal Democrats gain from Conservative		Swing		

=== Chew Valley ===
Chew Valley (2 seats)
Party	Candidate	Votes	%	±%
Conservative	Victor Lewis Pritchard *	926	50.7	
Conservative	Karen Ruth Warrington *	717	39.3	
Liberal Democrats	Nicola Emma Sewell	543	29.7	
Liberal Democrats	Amy Fortnam	486	26.6	
Green	David Guy Parkes	421	23.1	
Labour	Helen Stockwell	184	10.1	
Turnout		1,847	39.5	N/A
Registered electors		4,680		
Rejected ballots		21	1.1	
Conservative win (new seat)				
Conservative win (new seat)				

=== Clutton & Farmborough ===
Clutton & Farmborough
Party	Candidate	Votes	%	±%
Conservative	Sally Davis *	381	41.2	
Liberal Democrats	Ann Margaret Morgan	257	27.8	
Green	Sam Ross	234	25.3	
Labour	Alison Mary Simpson	52	5.6	
Majority		124	13.4	N/A
Turnout		935	39.7	N/A
Registered electors		2,355		
Rejected ballots		11	1.2	
Conservative win (new seat)				

=== Combe Down ===
Combe Down (2 seats)
Party	Candidate	Votes	%	±%
Liberal Democrats	Bharat Ramji Nathoo Pankhania	927	42.4	
Liberal Democrats	Gerry Curran	800	36.6	
Conservative	Bob Goodman *	733	33.5	
Conservative	Steve Merrifield	562	25.7	
Green	David Charles Andrews	487	22.3	
BIG	Nola Edwards	376	17.2	
Labour	Tom Pymer	151	6.9	
Labour	Liz Vincent	146	6.7	
Turnout		2,197	47.6	
Registered electors		4,612		
Rejected ballots		10	0.5	
Liberal Democrats hold		Swing		
Liberal Democrats gain from Conservative		Swing		

=== High Littleton ===
High Littleton
Party	Candidate	Votes	%	±%
Liberal Democrats	Ryan David Wills	595	57.8	+41.5
Conservative	Leslie John Kew *	320	31.1	−32.1
Green	Pat Roscow	67	6.5	−14.0
Labour	Judith Patricia Brown	48	4.7	N/A
Majority		275	26.7	N/A
Turnout		1,038	43.6	
Registered electors		2,380		
Rejected ballots		8	0.8	
Liberal Democrats gain from Conservative		Swing		

=== Keynsham East ===
Keynsham East (2 seats)
Party	Candidate	Votes	%	±%
Liberal Democrats	Andy Wait	1,084	54.6	
Liberal Democrats	Hal MacFie	1,038	52.3	
Conservative	Matthew Paul Blankley	584	29.4	
Conservative	Jayne Smith	574	28.9	
BIG	Melanie Hilton	238	12.0	
Labour	John Brian Wood	160	8.1	
Labour	Keith Burchell	135	6.8	
Turnout		1,997	44.9	
Registered electors		4,443		
Rejected ballots		11	0.6	
Liberal Democrats gain from Conservative		Swing		
Liberal Democrats gain from Conservative		Swing		

=== Keynsham North ===
Keynsham North (2 seats)
Party	Candidate	Votes	%	±%
Conservative	Brian Simmons *	600	40.5	
Conservative	Victor John Clarke	541	36.5	
Labour	Andy McGuinness	398	26.9	
Labour	Jonathan Samuel Wallcroft	394	26.6	
Liberal Democrats	Olivia Leydenfrost	343	23.2	
Liberal Democrats	Clive Kenneth Dellard	323	21.8	
UKIP	Steve Grimes	171	11.5	
Turnout		1,485	34.2	
Registered electors		4,339		
Rejected ballots		4	0.3	
Conservative hold		Swing		
Conservative hold		Swing		

=== Keynsham South ===
Keynsham South (2 seats)
Party	Candidate	Votes	%	±%
Conservative	Alan Dudley Hale *	670	42.9	
Conservative	Lisa O'Brien *	464	29.7	
Labour	David William Biddleston	437	28.0	
Labour	Joan Liley	299	19.2	
Green	Fiona Mary Edwards	283	18.1	
BIG	Jessica Tamsin Milton	210	13.5	
Liberal Democrats	Claire Veronica Jackson	180	11.5	
UKIP	Nathan Lerway	175	11.2	
Liberal Democrats	Rosemary Rea Todd	131	8.4	
Turnout		1,568	31.3	
Registered electors		5,002		
Rejected ballots		7	0.4	
Conservative hold		Swing		
Conservative hold		Swing		

=== Kingsmead ===
Kingsmead (2 seats)
Party	Candidate	Votes	%	±%
Liberal Democrats	Sue Craig *	721	45.7	
Liberal Democrats	Andy Furse *	664	42.1	
Labour	Sharon Louise Gillings	421	26.7	
Green	Eric Lucas	294	18.6	
Labour	Mike Midgley	272	17.2	
Conservative	Oliver Hamish Thomas Dudley	230	14.6	
Conservative	Peter Joseph Michael Turner *	213	13.5	
BIG	Molly Martha Conisbee	179	11.3	
Turnout		1,589	38.9	
Registered electors		4,090		
Rejected ballots		11	0.7	
Liberal Democrats hold		Swing		
Liberal Democrats gain from Conservative		Swing		

=== Lambridge ===
Lambridge (2 seats)
Party	Candidate	Votes	%	±%
Liberal Democrats	Joanna Wright	1,050	46.3	
Liberal Democrats	Rob Appleyard *	1,025	45.2	
Green	Fay Emily Veare Whitfield	544	24.0	
Labour Co-op	Lesley Kathleen Bees	453	20.0	
Labour Co-op	Jane Alice Samson	395	17.4	
Conservative	Emily Jane Peacock	313	13.8	
Conservative	Mark Patrick Mac Donnell	301	13.3	
BIG	Paula Malone	250	11.0	
Turnout		2,278	52.3	
Registered electors		4,352		
Rejected ballots		10	0.4	
Liberal Democrats hold		Swing		
Liberal Democrats gain from Green		Swing		

=== Lansdown ===
Lansdown (2 seats)
Party	Candidate	Votes	%	±%
Liberal Democrats	Lucy Jane Hodge	1,151	55.1	
Liberal Democrats	Mark William Elliott	1,028	49.2	
Conservative	Manuel Emilio Pimentel-Reid	553	26.5	
Conservative	Andrew Edwin Charles Pattie	532	25.5	
Green	Jonathan Oates	301	14.4	
BIG	Stephen Richard Arthur Taylor	301	14.4	
Labour	Rosemary Joan Sansome	158	7.6	
Turnout		2,098	50.2	
Registered electors		4,179		
Rejected ballots		10	0.5	
Liberal Democrats gain from Conservative		Swing		
Liberal Democrats gain from Conservative		Swing		

=== Mendip ===
Mendip
Party	Candidate	Votes	%	±%
Liberal Democrats	David Wood	806	67.0	+52.1
Conservative	Tim Warren *	338	28.1	−35.7
Labour	Howard Ian Simpson	59	4.9	N/A
Majority		468	38.9	N/A
Turnout		1,210	54.1	
Registered electors		2,238		
Rejected ballots		7	0.6	
Liberal Democrats gain from Conservative		Swing		

=== Midsomer Norton North ===
Midsomer Norton North (2 seats)
Party	Candidate	Votes	%	±%
Independent	Shaun Hughes	436	34.3	
Conservative	Michael Evans *	413	32.5	
Liberal Democrats	Edward Michael Jakins	283	22.3	
Liberal Democrats	Ben Stevens	271	21.3	
Conservative	Ben Warren	247	19.4	
Labour Co-op	Andrew Barnes	234	18.4	
Labour Co-op	Fflyff McLaren	209	16.4	
Green	Grace Wiltshire	208	16.4	
Turnout		1,284	30.0	
Registered electors		4,280		
Rejected ballots		13	1.0	
Independent gain from Conservative		Swing		
Conservative hold		Swing		

=== Midsomer Norton Redfield ===
Midsomer Norton Redfield (2 seats)
Party	Candidate	Votes	%	±%
Conservative	Paul Myers *	817	57.4	
Conservative	Chris Watt *	654	45.9	
Independent	John Edward Terry Baker	295	20.7	
Labour	Lauren Barnes	288	20.2	
Green	Vicki Gait	268	18.8	
Liberal Democrats	Gitte Dawson	133	9.3	
Liberal Democrats	Alice Ekrek Hovanessian	96	6.7	
Turnout		1,433	30.4	
Registered electors		4,711		
Rejected ballots		9	0.6	
Conservative hold		Swing		
Conservative hold		Swing		

=== Moorlands ===
Moorlands
Party	Candidate	Votes	%	±%
Liberal Democrats	Jess David	639	61.3	
Conservative	Paul Francis Cobden Massey	165	15.8	
Labour	Lesley Benita Hall	141	13.5	
Green	Tim Beadle	98	9.4	
Majority		474	45.4	N/A
Turnout		1,051	43.0	N/A
Registered electors		2,444		
Rejected ballots		8	0.8	
Liberal Democrats win (new seat)				

=== Newbridge ===
Newbridge (2 seats)
Party	Candidate	Votes	%	±%
Liberal Democrats	Michelle O'Doherty *	1,439	64.4	
Liberal Democrats	Mark Roper	1,153	51.6	
Conservative	Loraine Morgan-Brinkhurst	580	26.0	
Conservative	David Miller Workman	460	20.6	
Green	Dick Daniel	353	15.8	
Labour	Maggy White	140	6.3	
Labour	Ashley James Lewis	134	6.0	
Turnout		2,248	47.2	
Registered electors		4,767		
Rejected ballots		15	0.7	
Liberal Democrats hold		Swing		
Liberal Democrats gain from Conservative		Swing		

=== Odd Down ===
Odd Down (2 seats)
Party	Candidate	Votes	%	±%
Liberal Democrats	Steve Hedges*	1,095	54.5	
Liberal Democrats	Joel Edwin Hirst	1,028	51.4	
Green	Kathy Anne Beadle	508	25.3	
Green	Dom Tristram	418	20.9	
Labour	Paul Robert Purnell	316	15.7	
Conservative	Michael James Clarkson	260	12.9	
Conservative	Alastair James Thompson	238	11.9	
Turnout		2,024	39.4	
Registered electors		5,134		
Rejected ballots		13	0.6	
Liberal Democrats hold		Swing		
Liberal Democrats hold		Swing		

=== Oldfield Park ===
Oldfield Park
Party	Candidate	Votes	%	±%
Liberal Democrats	Shaun Andrew Stephenson-McGall *	759	73.8	
Conservative	Brian John Webber	108	10.5	
Green	Olivia Grace Fitzgerald	97	9.4	
Labour	Vanessa Ann Jessop	64	6.2	
Majority		651	63.3	N/A
Turnout		1,034	48.3	N/A
Registered electors		2,143		
Rejected ballots		6	0.6	
Liberal Democrats win (new seat)				

=== Paulton ===
Paulton (2 seats)
Party	Candidate	Votes	%	±%
Labour	Liz Hardman *	808	62.3	
Labour	Grant Johnson	630	48.6	
Independent	Jeff Humphries	272	21.0	
Conservative	John Duddy	177	13.7	
UKIP	Ian Edmund Kealey	177	13.7	
Conservative	Muriel Megan Harris	167	12.9	
Liberal Democrats	Zoe Louise Bushell	112	8.6	
Liberal Democrats	Debra Julie Ballington	78	6.0	
Turnout		1,308	28.7	
Registered electors		4,560		
Rejected ballots		12	0.9	
Labour hold		Swing		
Labour hold		Swing		

=== Peasedown ===
Peasedown (2 seats)
Party	Candidate	Votes	%	±%
Independent	Sarah Frances Bevan *	835	50.2	
Independent	Karen Francine Walker *	791	47.5	
Conservative	Jo Davis	380	22.8	
Conservative	Kathy Thomas	331	19.9	
Labour	Jonathan Paul Rich	250	15.0	
Green	David John König	182	10.9	
Liberal Democrats	Ray Love	177	10.6	
Labour	Vincent Michael Cox	157	9.4	
Liberal Democrats	Adam William John Reynolds	93	5.6	
Turnout		1,674	33.5	
Registered electors		4,994		
Rejected ballots		10	0.6	
Independent gain from Village Voice		Swing		
Independent gain from Village Voice		Swing		

=== Publow with Whitchurch ===
Publow with Whitchurch
Party	Candidate	Votes	%	±%
Conservative	Paul May *	470	59.6	−6.8
Green	Steve Day	143	18.1	−1.2
Labour	Julian Alexander Woonton	121	15.4	N/A
Liberal Democrats	Meghan Amber Jones	54	6.9	−7.3
Majority		327	41.5	–5.6
Turnout		797	37.6	
Registered electors		2,120		
Rejected ballots		9	1.1	
Conservative hold		Swing		

=== Radstock ===
Radstock (2 seats)
Party	Candidate	Votes	%	±%
Labour Co-op	Christopher John Dando *	428	27.9	
Liberal Democrats	Bruce Andrew Shearn	417	27.2	
Labour Co-op	Lesley Ann Mansell	383	25.0	
Conservative	Rupert Stephen Jude Bevan	317	20.7	
Independent	Mike Boulton	295	19.2	
Green	Rob Carter	289	18.8	
Liberal Democrats	Toby Simon	272	17.7	
UKIP	Philip Michael Allen	234	15.2	
Conservative	Deirdre Mary Horstmann *	220	14.3	
Turnout		1,538	35.1	
Registered electors		4,385		
Rejected ballots		3	0.2	
Labour Co-op hold		Swing		
Liberal Democrats gain from Conservative		Swing		

=== Saltford ===
Saltford (2 seats)
Party	Candidate	Votes	%	±%
Liberal Democrats	Duncan Stuart Hounsell	1,124	54.3	
Liberal Democrats	Alastair Graham Singleton	944	45.6	
Conservative	Emma Clare Dixon *	775	37.4	
Conservative	Elizabeth Mary Alice Carter	724	35.0	
Green	Antony Stuart Dobson	241	11.6	
Labour	John Anthony Bull *	139	6.7	
Turnout		2,085	42.8	
Registered electors		4,874		
Rejected ballots		15	0.7	
Liberal Democrats gain from Conservative		Swing		
Liberal Democrats gain from Conservative		Swing		

=== Southdown ===
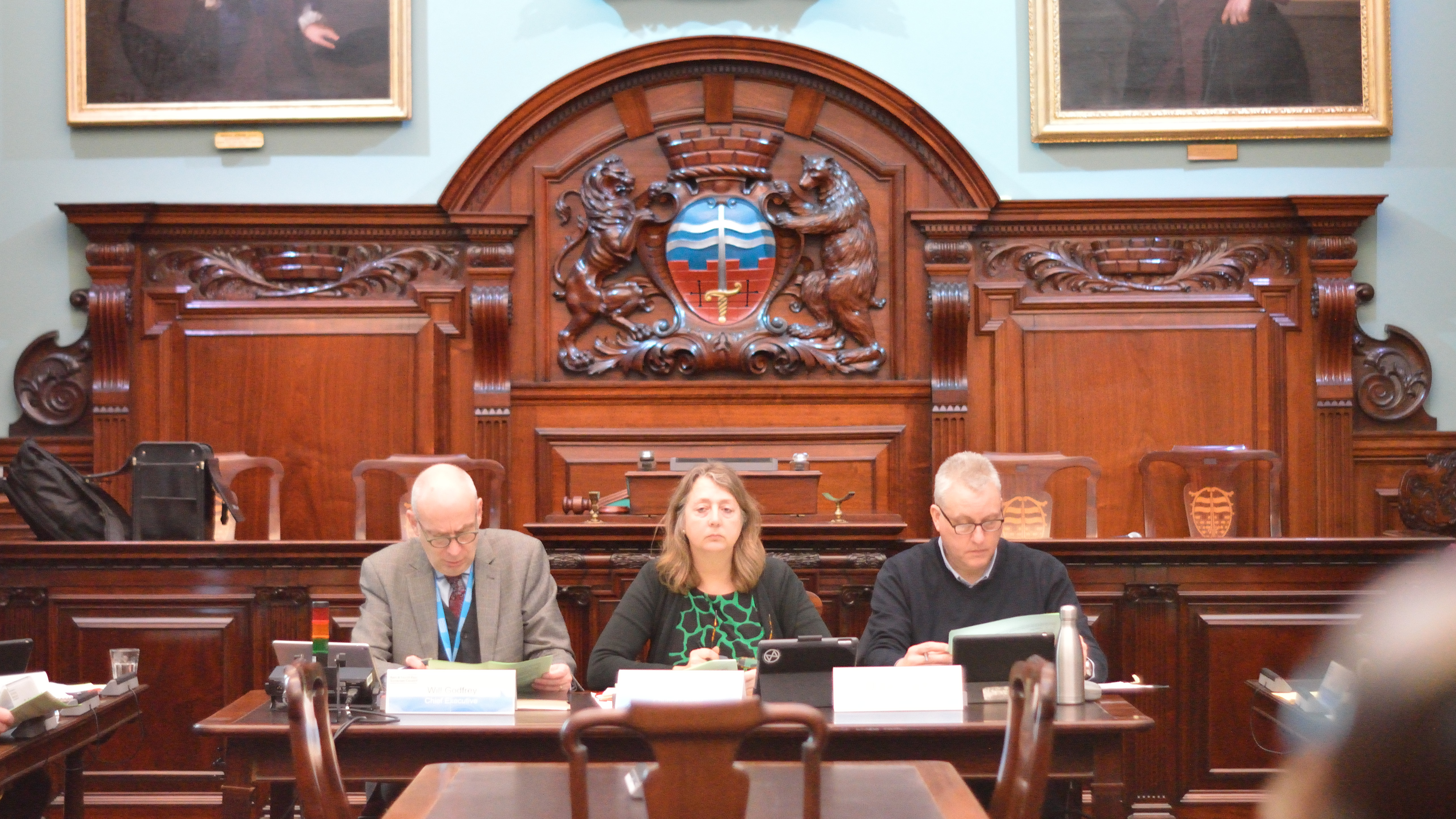
Dine Romero became Council Leader after the election, seen here chairing the Cabinet meeting which agreed the Bath Clean Air Zone

Southdown (2 seats)
Party	Candidate	Votes	%	±%
Liberal Democrats	Dine Romero *	1,119	59.1	
Liberal Democrats	Paul Nigel Crossley *	1,019	53.8	
Green	Jon Lucas	493	26.0	
Labour	David William Musgrave	407	21.5	
Conservative	Patrick Anketell-Jones *	243	12.8	
Conservative	Lindsay Sally Whitmore	222	11.7	
Turnout		1,909	37.8	
Registered electors		5,045		
Rejected ballots		14	0.7	
Liberal Democrats hold		Swing		
Liberal Democrats hold		Swing		

=== Timsbury ===
Timsbury
Party	Candidate	Votes	%	±%
Independent	Douglas Eric Deacon *	448	59.3	+13.4
Conservative	Allan Melville Sinclair	115	15.2	−7.2
Liberal Democrats	Sean Robert Stephenson-McGall	102	13.5	+2.6
Labour Co-op	Chris Reddy	91	12.0	−0.5
Majority		333	44.2	+20.7
Turnout		759	37.2	
Registered electors		2,040		
Rejected ballots		3	0.4	
Independent hold		Swing		

=== Twerton ===
Twerton (2 seats)
Party	Candidate	Votes	%	±%
Liberal Democrats	Tim Ball *	886	66.4	
Liberal Democrats	Sarah Moore	764	57.2	
Labour	Rachel Willis	312	23.4	
Labour	Cameron Standring	250	18.7	
Green	Iona Everett	146	10.9	
Conservative	Max Seal	90	6.7	
Conservative	Jordan Edwards	75	5.6	
Turnout		1,344	28.9	
Registered electors		4,645		
Rejected ballots		9	0.7	
Liberal Democrats hold		Swing		
Liberal Democrats gain from Labour		Swing		

=== Walcot ===
Walcot (2 seats)
Party	Candidate	Votes	%	±%
Liberal Democrats	Richard Emlyn Samuel *	1,050	58.6	
Liberal Democrats	Tom Davies	930	51.9	
Green	Tim Morgan	469	26.2	
Labour	Nathan Stanley Russell	284	15.8	
Conservative	Isobel Mary Blackburn	254	14.2	
Conservative	Stuart Laurence Kay	242	13.5	
Labour	Paul Tom Edward Tucker	225	12.5	
Turnout		1,807	42.4	
Registered electors		4,259		
Rejected ballots		14	0.8	
Liberal Democrats hold		Swing		
Liberal Democrats gain from Conservative		Swing		

=== Westfield ===
Westfield (2 seats)
Party	Candidate	Votes	%	±%
Labour	Robin Moss *	479	44.9	
Labour	Eleanor Margaret Jackson *	461	43.2	
Green	Christian Michael Wach	247	23.0	
UKIP	Michael David Hooper	241	22.5	
Conservative	Margaret Rose Brewer	183	17.2	
Conservative	Katharine Sara Simmons	154	14.4	
Liberal Democrats	Sharon Grace Ball	95	8.9	
Liberal Democrats	Belinda Mary Gornall	75	7.0	
Turnout		1,072	22.6	
Registered electors		4,733		
Rejected ballots		6	0.6	
Labour hold		Swing		
Labour hold		Swing		

=== Westmoreland ===
Westmoreland (2 seats)
Party	Candidate	Votes	%	±%
Independent	June Player *	874	59.2	
Independent	Colin David Blackburn *	602	40.8	
Liberal Democrats	Jonathan David Adcock	445	30.1	
Liberal Democrats	Sam Campling	391	26.5	
Green	Jo Williams	219	14.8	
Labour Co-op	Brad Baines	134	9.1	
Conservative	Susan Gillian Henley Green	83	5.6	
Conservative	Lyn Jacobs	63	4.3	
Turnout		1,476	38.4	
Registered electors		3,848		
Independent hold		Swing		
Independent hold		Swing		

=== Weston ===
Weston (2 seats)
Party	Candidate	Votes	%	±%
Liberal Democrats	Shelley Bromley	1,216	54.3	
Liberal Democrats	Ruth Madeleine Malloy	1,138	50.8	
Conservative	Matthew Paul Davies *	603	26.9	
Conservative	Alison Peters Sandeman	535	23.9	
Green	Lisa Loveridge	355	15.8	
BIG	Guy Edward Ian Hodgson	203	9.1	
Labour	Tamsin Egan	201	9.0	
Turnout		2,251	50.2	
Registered electors		4,483		
Rejected ballots		11	0.5	
Liberal Democrats gain from Conservative		Swing		
Liberal Democrats gain from Conservative		Swing		

=== Widcombe & Lyncombe ===
Widcombe and Lyncombe (2 seats)
Party	Candidate	Votes	%	±%
Liberal Democrats	Alison Patricia Sian Born	1,852	67.6	
Liberal Democrats	Peter Winston Gordon Duguid	1,404	51.3	
Conservative	Mark Grosvenor McNeill Shelford *	632	23.1	
Green	Adam James Ley-Lange	610	22.3	
Conservative	Jasper Martin Becker *	566	20.7	
Labour	Mary Patricia Flitton	239	8.7	
Turnout		2,758	56.1	N/A
Registered electors		4,917		
Rejected ballots		19	0.7	
Liberal Democrats win (new seat)				
Liberal Democrats win (new seat)				

== Changes 2019–2023 ==
- 4 May 2021: Kevin Guy was elected leader of the council for the remainder of the 2019–2023 term.
- 12 May 2021: Paul Myers resigned the Conservative whip and sat as an independent councillor for Midsomer Norton Redfield until the 2023 election.
