= Bath Forum =

Historical Hundred of Somerset, England

- Status: Hundred
- Subdivisions
  - Type: Parishes
  - Units: Batheaston, Bathford, Bathwick, St. Katherine, Freshford, Kelston, Langridge, Lyncombe and Widcombe, Moncktoncombe, North Stoke, South Stoke, Swainswick, Weston, and Woolley

Bath Forum is one of the 40 historical hundreds in the ceremonial county of Somerset, England, dating from before the Norman Conquest during the Anglo-Saxon era although exact dates are unknown. The Bath Hundred had various names over the centuries including The Hundred of Le Buri. The Bath Foreign Hundred or Forinsecum covered the area outside the city itself.

The Hundred of Bath Forum was situated at the northeast point of the county of Somerset, bounded on the north by the county of Gloucester, on the east by that of Wiltshire, on the west by the Hundred of Keynsham and on the south and southwest by the Hundred of Wellow.

It latterly contained the City of Bath, and contained the surrounding parishes of Batheaston, Bathford, Bathwick, St. Katherine, Freshford, Kelston, Langridge, Lyncombe and Widcombe, Moncktoncombe, North Stoke, South Stoke, Swainswick, Weston, and Woolley.
