= Margaret Graham (balloonist) =

British aeronaut

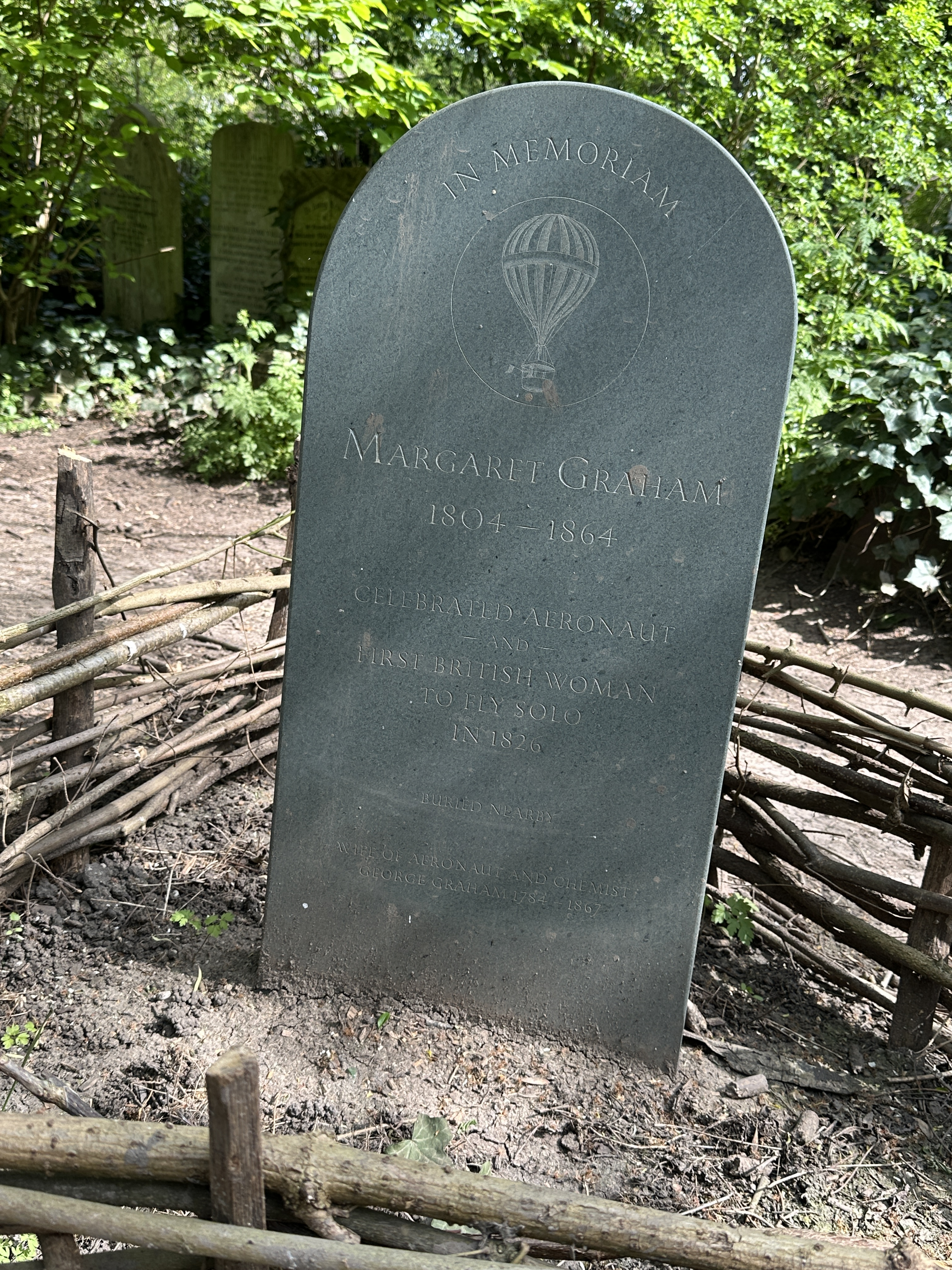
Graham's grave marker at Abney Park Cemetery in 2025

Margaret Graham (née Watson; c. 1804 – c. 1864) was the first British woman to make a solo balloon flight, a feat which she accomplished in 1826.

== Early life and marriage ==
She was born in Walcot, Bath, and married the pioneer balloonist George Graham, with whom she first flew on 2 June 1824, when he made an ascent from White Conduit Gardens in Islington, London. They had three daughters, who would later also make balloon flights with her from about 1850 onwards.

== Ballooning ==
On 28 June 1826, a flight was planned in which Mrs Graham and a woman named Jane Stocks were due to ascend from White Conduit Gardens. However, Jane Stocks did not in the end go with her, and this was the first solo flight by a British female pilot. Margaret's career as a balloonist lasted for more than thirty years in total.

In 1827, George Graham was taken to court for debt, and was in custody for several months before the case was heard. Margaret Graham testified on his behalf, stating that the cost of making the balloon far exceeded the price for which her husband's creditor, a Mr Brooker, proposed to sell it, and also claiming that the balloon was no longer Graham's property.

On 7 August 1850, a balloon in which Mrs Graham was travelling caught fire following its descent near Edmonton, London, but she survived the accident. In the same year, she made the first night-time ascent in a balloon that had been undertaken by a woman, in a balloon launched from Vauxhall Gardens. In 1851, she and her husband made a commemorative flight during the Great Exhibition.

== Death and commemoration ==
Margaret Graham died impoverished at the age of 60 in 1864 and was buried in an unmarked common grave at Abney Park Cemetery. In 2022, the Abney Park Trust launched an appeal to fund a gravestone for Mrs Graham. which was unveiled in October 2022 ref Trusts 2022/2023 Annual Report.
