= Walcot, Bath =

Area within the City of Bath, Somerset, England

Coordinates: 51.3920°N 2.3558°W

Walcot
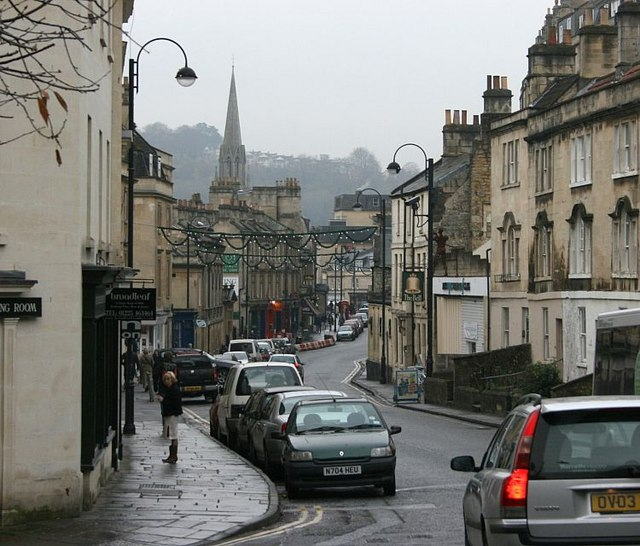
- Walcot Street

- Location within Somerset
- Population: 5,920 (2011; ward)
- OS grid reference: ST753659
- Unitary authority: Bath and North East Somerset
- Ceremonial county: Somerset
- Region: South West
- Country: England
- Sovereign state: United Kingdom
- Post town: BATH
- Postcode district: BA1
- Dialling code: 01225
- Police: Avon and Somerset
- Fire: Avon
- Ambulance: South Western
- UK Parliament: Bath

Walcot is a suburb of the city of Bath, in the Bath and North East Somerset district, in the ceremonial county of Somerset, England. It lies to the north-north-east of the city centre, and is an electoral ward of the city.

The Paragon and, continuing out of the city, London Road are part of the A4 road. The other main thoroughfare is Walcot Street, which adjoins the city centre and is well known for its artisan shops.

Walcot Street and London Road are believed to be a Roman road, leading north from the Roman town of Aquae Sulis and linking with the Fosse Way. Walcot originally grew as a residential area (a vicus) in the 1st to 3rd centuries, located between the walled town, the Fosse Way and the possible Roman fort sited across the river in the Bathwick area.

The parish church of St Swithin, on The Paragon was built in 1779-90 by John Palmer. The 18th-century poet Christopher Anstey is buried at the church. Walcot was the birthplace of Richard Debaufre Guyon, who would become, in succession, an Austrian officer, a Hungarian rebel and an Ottoman Pasha.

== Governance ==
The electoral ward returns two councillors to Bath and North East Somerset Council. The wards surrounding Walcot ward are: Lansdown to the north-west, Lambridge to the north-east, Bathwick to the south-east, and Kingsmead to the south-west. The River Avon forms the boundary with Bathwick and is crossed here by the Cleveland Bridge. The Grosvenor area of the city falls within the ward.

In 1891 the civil parish had a population of 24,899. On 26 March 1900 the parish was abolished to form Bath.

== Notable residents ==
- Richard Guyon (1813–1856), British-born Hungarian soldier, general in the Hungarian Revolutionary Army.
- Sir William Herschel (1738–1822), astronomer, musician.
- Benjamin Plim Bellamy (1782–1847), actor and proprietor of the Bath Assembly Rooms.
- Arnold Ridley (1896-1984), actor and playwright.
- Margaret Graham (balloonist) (1804-1864) first British woman to make a solo balloon flight, which she accomplished in 1826.
