= Lyncombe, Bath =

Electoral ward in Bath, United Kingdom

Coordinates: 51.3730°N 2.3563°W

Lyncombe
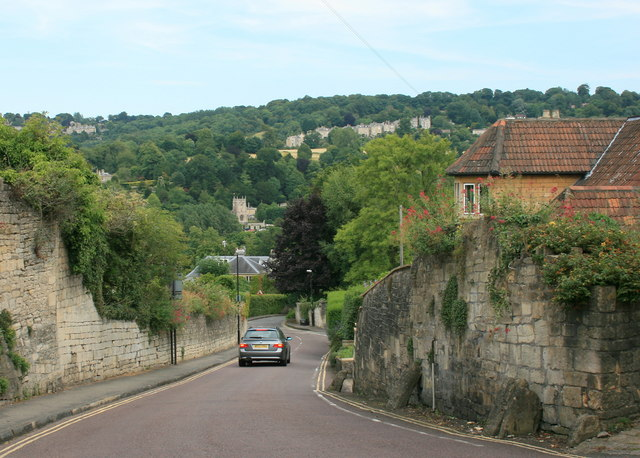
- Greenway Lane, on the former parish boundary, looking towards St Thomas à Becket Church, Widcombe

- Location within Somerset
- Population: 5,505 (2011.Ward)
- Unitary authority: Bath and North East Somerset
- Ceremonial county: Somerset
- Region: South West
- Country: England
- Sovereign state: United Kingdom
- Post town: BATH
- Postcode district: BA2
- Dialling code: 01225
- Police: Avon and Somerset
- Fire: Avon
- Ambulance: South Western
- UK Parliament: Bath

Lyncombe is a district and electoral ward in Bath, Somerset, and a former parish in the Diocese of Bath and Wells. In the mid-19th century the parish was formed when the parish of Widcombe and Lyncombe was split in two, but it was abolished in the late 1960s. The village of Lyncombe existed since at least the Saxon period prior to becoming part of the City of Bath.

Lyncombe takes its name from the Celtic word cwm meaning valley, with the Lyn being the name of the stream that runs through it. The present day district is approximately centred on the Western part of this valley, known as Lyncombe Vale, and extends down to the more urban area around the River Avon across from Bath Spa railway station. The northern area of the electoral ward is known as Bear Flat.

The electoral ward was merged with Widcombe at the boundary changes effected at the elections held on 2 May 2019.

== History ==
The Manor of Lyncombe was ecclesiastical property from the time of Osric, king of the Hwicce in the 7th century to the Norman Conquest. A charter of the City of Bath records that in 970 King Edgar "granted ten hides at Cliftune (i.e. Lyncombe), near Bath, Somerset, to St Peter's church, Bath, in return for 100 mancuses of gold and ten hides at Cumtune (possibly Chilcompton or Compton Dando, Somerset)."

The Domesday Book showed that in 1066 Sæweald Abbot of Bath, held 10 hides in Lyncombe. In 1086 this land was held by Ælfsige, his successor. Following the death of William the Conqueror the Burgh of Bath, including Lyncombe Manor was sold by his son, William Rufus to John of Tours, Bishop of Wells who moved the bishopric to Bath.

In 1302 the Priory of Bath obtained a licence for fairs on their manor of Lyncombe on the Feast of the Cross and on the Feast of Saint Lawrence.

Lyncombe was part of the hundred of Bath Forum.

When Bath became popular as a spa town during the Georgian era, Lyncombe Vale was a famous beauty spot often visited by the well-to-do, and Jane Austen visited on one of her stays in the city. A mineral spring was discovered in Lyncombe Vale in 1737 by Mr Charles Milsom, a cooper (after whose son, Milsom Street in Bath was named). When attempting to fix a leaking fishpond he noticed a sulphurous odour, and saw water bubbling up from the ground. He then styled himself as a doctor and invited friends and neighbours to drink it. The following year a Dr Hillary wrote a treatise on the health-giving properties of the water, and the two men built a stone edifice over the spring to receive patients. However this weakened the ground and caused the spring to fail.

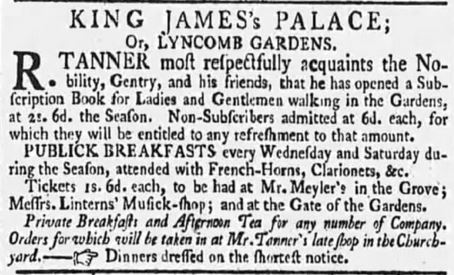
Advertisement for King James's Palace

Lyncombe House, adjacent to the spa, was often called "King James's palace", a name derived from a tradition that James II of England stayed there with his consort Mary of Modena after abdicating the throne. Although this cannot be corroborated, it is known that Mary made a long visit to Bath in 1687, and later the king joined her at a time when the city would not have afforded them the privacy they sought in the face of great public discontent. Lyncombe, less than a mile from the city, would have been a likely refuge. The house remained a popular destination until the 19th century. A 1792 advertisement in the local newspaper proclaims of "A Publick Night, [at] King James's Palace, Illuminations, and far more Brilliant Fireworks that ever were exhibited in the Gardens".

During the Industrial Revolution the district of Lyncombe and Widcombe was noted for the manufacture of woollen cloth, with 565 males over the age of 20 being employed in the industry in 1831. The area closest to the river was considered the manufacturing part of Bath, whereas the valley of Lyncombe Vale to the south remained a more secluded area of natural beauty.

In 1835 the Municipal Corporations Act extended the boundary of the city of Bath to include the entire parish of Lyncombe and Widcombe. Twenty years later in 1855, and following an increase in the population of the area, Widcombe and Lyncombe were split into two parishes, with the church of St Mark's to become the parish church of Lyncombe, and St Matthews the parish church of Widcombe:

Your Majesty's Commissioners for building new churches beg leave humbly to represent that, when the last census was taken, the parish of Lyncombe and Widcombe, in the county of Somerset, and diocese of Bath and Wells, contained a population of nine thousand nine hundred and seventy-three persons ... having taken into consideration all the circumstances of the said parish ... it appears to them to be expedient that the same should be divided into two distinct and separate parishes for all ecclesiastical purposes whatever ... and that the same should be respectively named "The parish of Lyncombe" and "The parish of Widcombe".

— The London Gazette, 12 February 1856

The boundaries of the new parish of Lyncombe were delineated thus by the Commissioners for Building New Churches:

The boundaries of the parish of Lyncombe commence at the north-western corner of such parish, where the same adjoins the parish of Twerton and the River Avon, and then proceed eastwardly along the middle of the said River Avon to Lower Widcombe Mill, on the west; then leaving the said River Avon and proceeding southwardly along the middle of the street or road, called Lyncombe Hill, and south-westwardly along the middle of the road or lane, called Greenway-lane, and then again, southwardly, along the middle of the road or lane, called Entry Hill, to the corner of the road near the house called the Cross Keys Inn, where the said parish of Lyncombe adjoins the parish of South Stoke; then proceeding in a westwardly direction along the boundary separating the said parish. of Lyncombe from the parish of South Stoke to the point where the same adjoins the parish of Englishcombe; then proceeding northwardly along the boundaries separating the said parish of Lyncombe from the parishes of Englishcombe and Twerton to the point where the boundary line of the said parish of Lyncombe commenced.

— The London Gazette, 12 February 1856

In 1972 due to a declined population and attendances the parish of Lyncombe was abolished and incorporated into a new parish of Saint Bartholomew based in nearby Oldfield Park:

PASTORAL MEASURE 1968 Notice is hereby given that Her Majesty was pleased on the 23rd October 1972, by Order in Council to confirm a Scheme made by the Church Commissioners for (1) altering the boundaries of the parishes of Bath, Lyncombe and Bath, Widcombe, in the diocese of Bath and Wells, (2) declaring redundant the parish church of the parish of Bath, Lyncombe, and (3) altering the name of the benefice and parish of Bath, Lyncombe to "The benefice (or parish) of Bath, Saint Bartholomew".

— The London Gazette, 26 October 1972
