= Weston, Bath =

Electoral ward in Bath, United Kingdom

Coordinates: 51.397°N 2.393°W

Weston
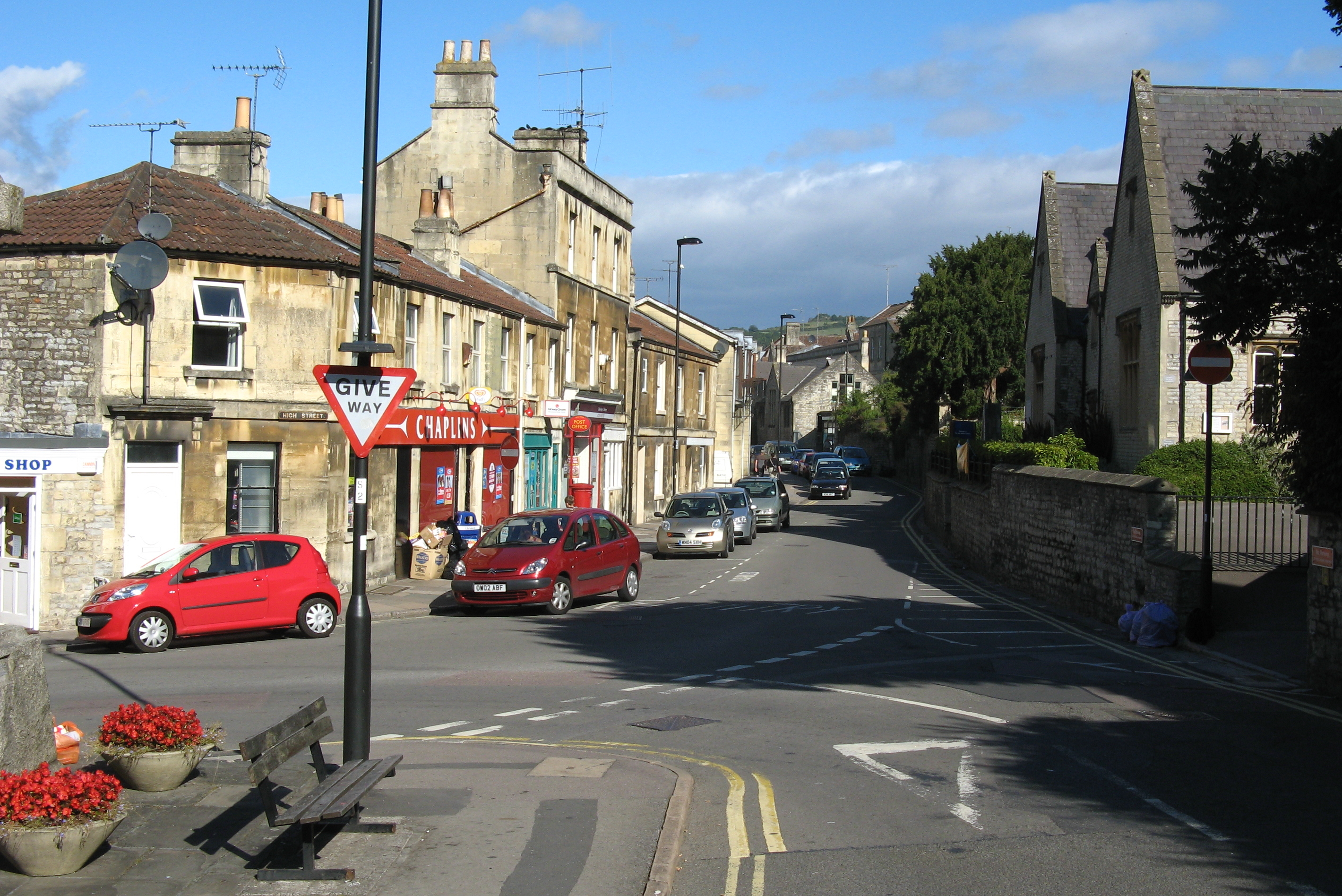
- Southern High Street, Weston, 2010

- Location within Somerset
- Population: 5,237 (ward, 2011)
- OS grid reference: ST728665
- Unitary authority: Bath and North East Somerset
- Ceremonial county: Somerset
- Region: South West
- Country: England
- Sovereign state: United Kingdom
- Post town: BATH
- Postcode district: BA1
- Dialling code: 01225
- Police: Avon and Somerset
- Fire: Avon
- Ambulance: South Western
- UK Parliament: Bath

Weston is a suburb and electoral ward of Bath in Bath and North East Somerset, Somerset, England, located in the northwest of the city. Originally a separate village, Weston has become part of Bath as the city has grown, first through the development of Lower Weston in Victorian times and then by the incorporation of the village into the city, with the siting of much local authority housing there in the period after World War II.

The ward includes Upper Weston, Weston village, Weston Park and the lower slopes of Primrose Hill. The area known as Lower Weston, south of Weston Road, is within Newbridge ward.

== History ==
The earliest evidence of occupation comes from two Celtic caddy spoons found in the village in 1825. There are believed to have been used as ceremonial anointing regalia.

During the 10th century, Weston had been divided into two estates. One, on the slopes of Lansdown was given by Edmund I to Aethelare in 946. Weston was the birthplace of Saint Alphege who was born around 954. Two manors with 41 households are recorded in the Domesday Book of 1086: one held by Bath Abbey and the other by Arnulf de Hesding.

During the 12th and 13th centuries Weston had close ties with the monks of the abbey, and in the late 13th century the first vicar of Weston was appointed by the church. Weston was part of the hundred of Bath Forum, with a manorial court or halmote being held in the parish. The land continued to be owned by the church and leased to tenants until the dissolution of the monasteries in 1539, after which the estates in Weston reverted to the king. In 1628 the land was sold to the Corporation of London although the king continued to receive rent until 1671, when it was sold to Sir Walter Long, Member of Parliament for Bath from 1679 (the Habeas Corpus Parliament) to 1681. Following the Battle of Lansdowne in 1643, some of the defeated Roundheads took refuge in Weston.

The village expanded during the 19th century with many areas being drained, the church rebuilt and new schools established. The Georgian expansion of Bath saw many houses built in Weston, and in 1834 Partis College was built nearby in Newbridge. Developments continued into the Victorian era with Weston Park and Combe Park being developed.

Weston was an ancient parish extending from the River Avon to the Gloucestershire boundary north of Lansdown. It became a civil parish in 1866. The southern parts of the parish were absorbed into Bath in 1911 and 1951, and the remaining, more rural, parts were absorbed into the civil parishes of Charlcombe and Kelston on 1 April 1953. In 1951 the parish had a population of 175.

Parts of Weston are at risk of flooding due to old watercourses, sinks and springs in the area. West Brook now runs underground below the High Street, but floods periodically. In 2013 the Weston Catchment alleviation scheme was announced to further protect the area.

== Services ==
Bath's main hospital, the Royal United Hospital, is just over the ward boundary in Newbridge, on one of the roads from central Bath into Weston.

Weston has two primary schools: Weston All Saints C.E. V.C Primary School, and St Mary's Catholic Primary School. Lower Weston is served by Newbridge School; an earlier primary school called Weston St John's closed when the primary departments at Newbridge expanded in the 1970s.

Weston has many local amenities, including a recreation ground and youth club, and shops and services including a bakery, Spar off-licence, post office, pharmacy, a takeaway, a bike shop and a newsagents. There is also a carpet shop and two hair salons. The village is dominated by a Tesco Express supermarket.

Weston village is home to the 66th Bath Scout Group who meet at the former school on the High Street. In Lower Weston, the 69th Bath Scout Group meet at the Methodist church. Bath Scouts also own a campsite on the edge of Weston at Cleeve Hill. Rainbows, Brownies and Guides also meet within the village, along with a Boys' Brigade Company.

== Religious sites ==
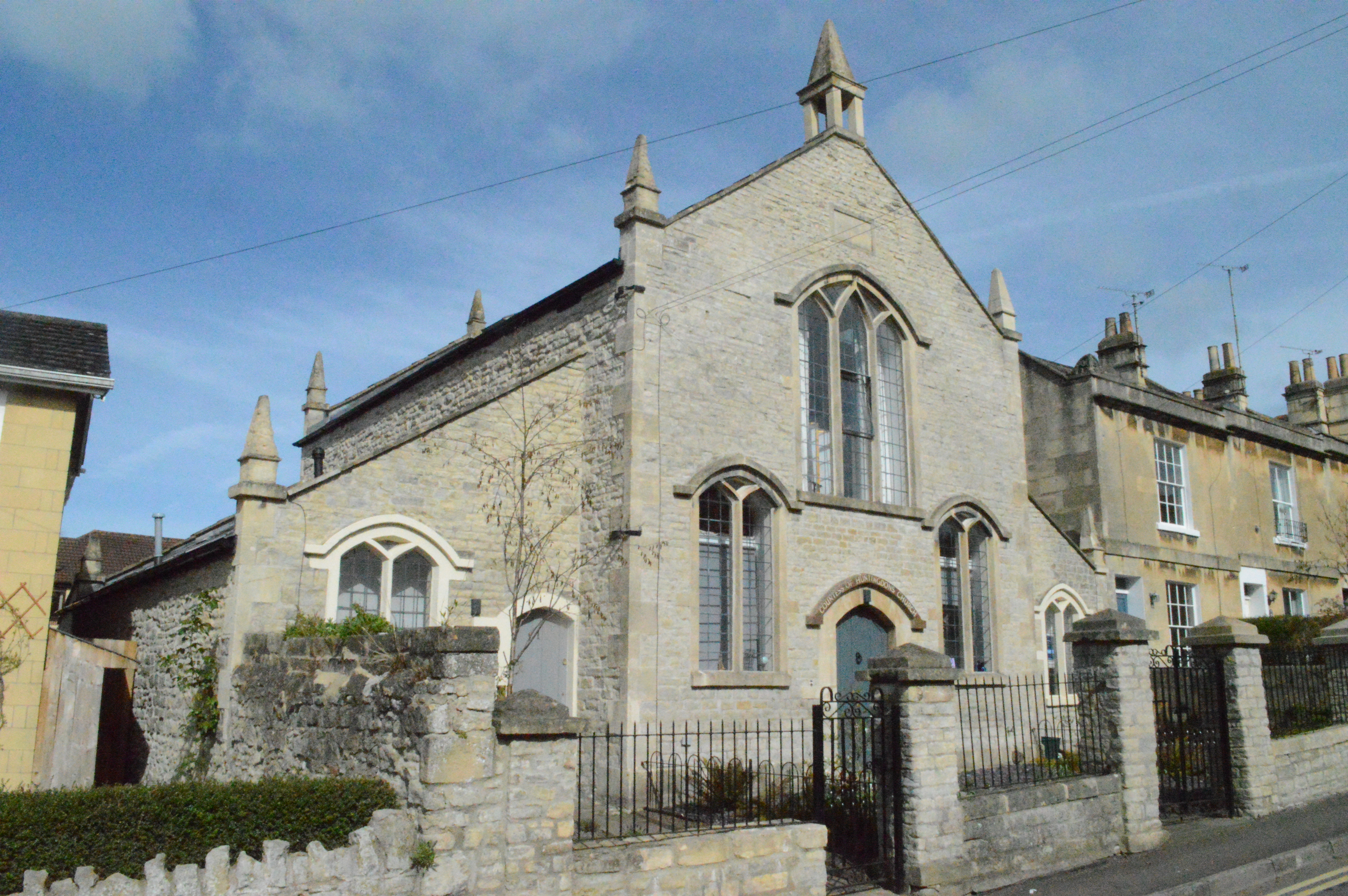
The Countess of Huntingdon's Chapel, an early Methodist chapel built by the Countess of Huntingdon, has now been converted into housing.

The village parish church is All Saints, founded no later than 1156. The current church dates from 1832 and was designed by the local architect John Pinch the younger, except for the tower which dates from the 15th century. The Lower Weston parish church is St John's, barely a mile from Bath's city centre, and now in Kingsmead ward. There is also a Moravian church sited at the bottom of Lansdown Lane; the nearest Catholic church is St. Mary's on Julian Road.

== Transport ==
Weston is served by four main bus routes, operated by First and The Big Lemon and providing connections towards Lower Weston, Newbridge, Bath City Centre, Twerton, University of Bath, Oldfield Park and Odd Down.

The Weston (Bath) railway station was at Lower Weston and closed in 1953, although the platform building and the stationmaster's house still exist. The station was on the Midland Railway line from Bath to Bristol and to the north, which closed in 1966.

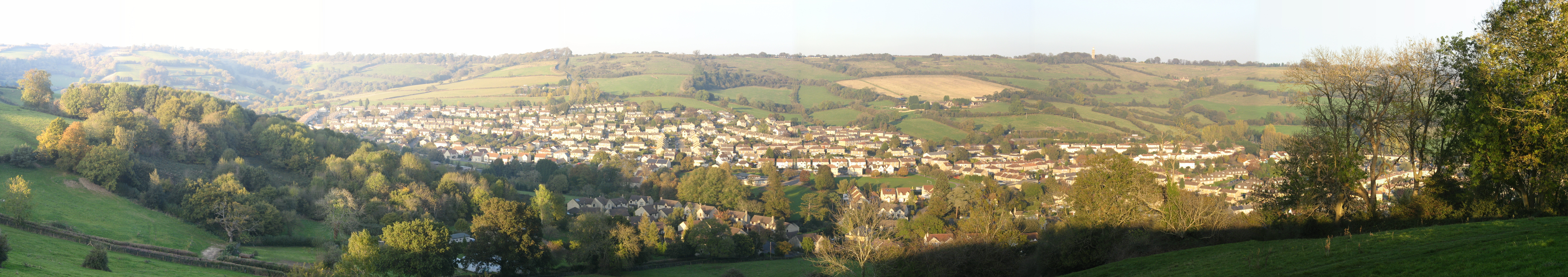
Upper Weston, from Penn Hill

== Bibliography ==
- Reverend John Collinson (1791). The History and Antiquities of the County of Somerset. Vol. 1. ISBN 978-1-171-40217-6.
- Hargood-Ash, Joan (2001). Two thousand years in the life of a Somerset village: Weston, Bath. Weston Local History Society. ISBN 0954164202.
- Knowles, David; London, Vera C. M.; Brooke, Christopher N.L. (2001). The Heads of Religious Houses, England and Wales, 940-1216 (Second ed.). Cambridge: Cambridge University Press. ISBN 0-521-80452-3.
- Oakley, Mike (2002). Somerset Railway stations. Wimborne: Dovecote Press. ISBN 978-1-904349-09-9.
