= Widcombe, Bath =

Electoral ward in Bath, United Kingdom

Coordinates: 51.376°N 2.352°W

Widcombe
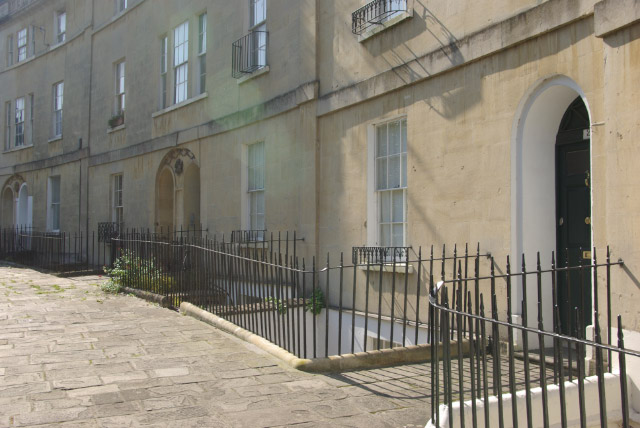
- Widcombe Crescent

- Location within Somerset
- Population: 5,770 (2011.Ward)
- OS grid reference: ST754642
- Unitary authority: Bath and North East Somerset
- Ceremonial county: Somerset
- Region: South West
- Country: England
- Sovereign state: United Kingdom
- Post town: BATH
- Postcode district: BA2
- Dialling code: 01225
- Police: Avon and Somerset
- Fire: Avon
- Ambulance: South Western
- UK Parliament: Bath

Widcombe is a district of Bath, England, immediately south-east of the city centre, across the River Avon.

The electoral ward was merged with Lyncombe at the boundary changes effected at the elections held on 2 May 2019; the two places have historically been connected (refer to the Lyncombe article).

== History ==
Widcombe was part of the hundred of Bath Forum.

In 1877 Halfpenny Bridge, a pedestrian toll bridge, across the River Avon from Bath Spa railway station to Widcombe collapsed with the loss of about 10 lives amongst a large crowd going to the Bath and West Agricultural show.

Widcombe properties damaged by enemy bombing 12 April 1941, nos. 5-7 Ebenezer Terrace were surveyed by E. Eales for Bath Corporation's Record of War Damage reports, nos.1169-1171 for First Aid repairs. Some shops in Widcombe Parade had windows broken.

== Architecture ==
Widcombe Parade is a commercial street lined with a mix of Georgian and Victorian buildings located near the Halfpenny Bridge, with buildings dating back as far as 1750. The area has been through many changes over the years, altered to improve traffic movement, removing an entire row of terraced houses at the west end of Widcombe Parade with the development of Rossiter Road as part of the main thoroughfare skirting the city centre of Bath.

St. Matthew's Church, built 1846–1847, with one of the tallest spires in Bath, is positioned to be viewed at the east end of Widcombe Parade.

Widcombe Manor House is a grade I listed manor house built in 1656. It is located on Church Street adjacent to St Thomas à Beckett Church.

Crowe Hall is a Georgian house. It is a Grade II listed building, and the gardens are on the Register of Historic Parks and Gardens of special historic interest in England. It was built around 1780 for Brigadier Crowe. It has had a succession of owners since who each adapted and renovated the building. A serious fire in 1926 destroyed a lot of the fabric of the building and further restoration was required. The house is surrounded by several hectares of sloping gardens, below Prior Park, which are terraced and include a rock garden and grotto.

Widcombe Crescent is a terrace of 14 Georgian houses built in 1808 by Thomas Baldwin, and designated a Grade I listed building.

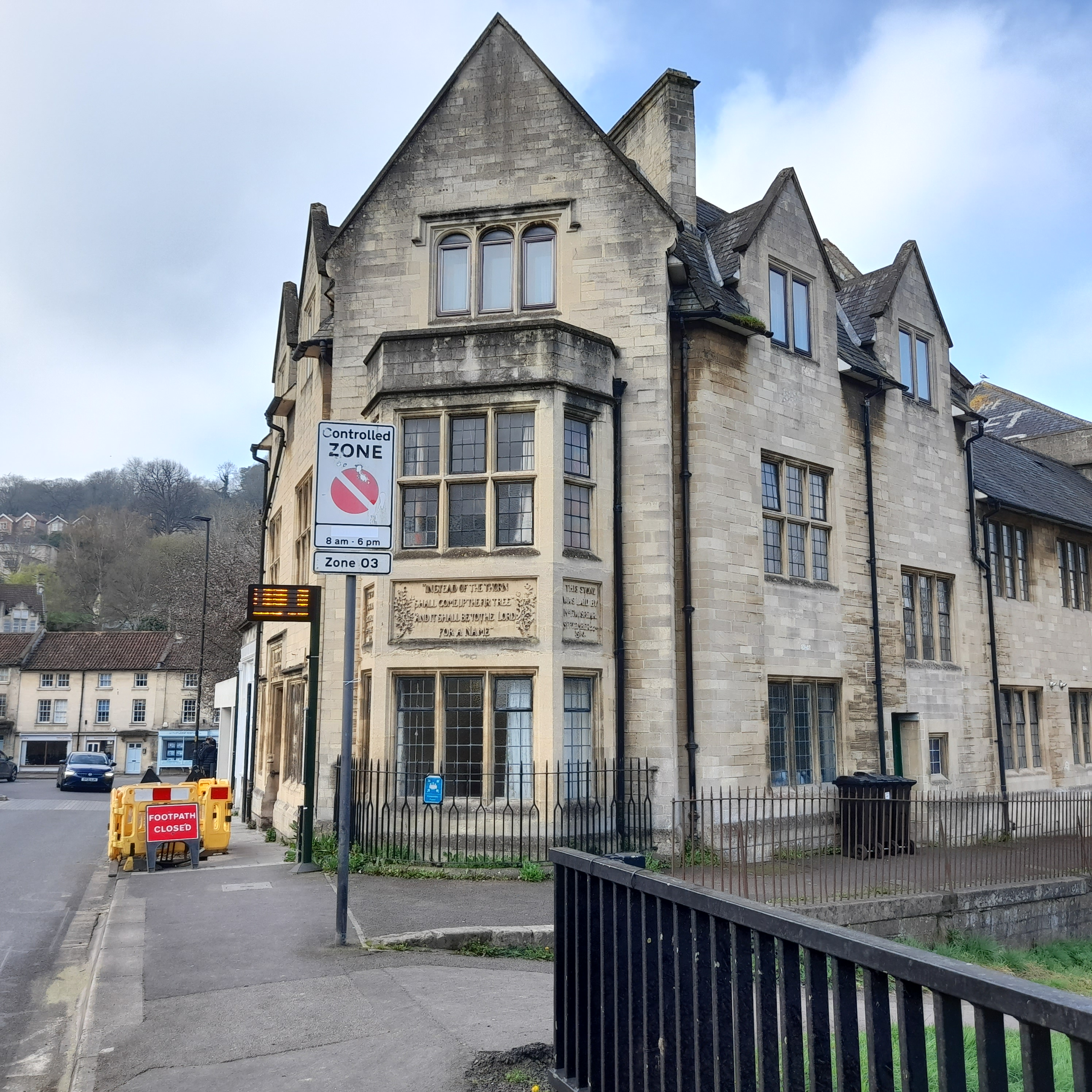
Widcombe Baptist Church, the corner of Ebenezer Terrace

== Canal ==
Widcombe is where the Kennet and Avon Canal meets the River Avon. Bath Locks are a series of locks, just south of Pulteney Bridge, which climb through Widcombe. Alongside the bottom lock is a side pond and pumping station which pumps water up the locks to replace that used each time the lock is opened. The next stage of Bath Deep Lock is numbered 8/9 as two locks were combined when the canal was restored in May, 1976. A road bridge carrying the A36, constructed while the canal was in a state of disrepair passes over the original site of the lower lock. The new chamber has a depth of 19 ft 5ins, making it Britain's second deepest canal lock. Just above the 'deep lock' is an area of water enabling the lock to refill and above this is Wash House Lock (number 10), and soon after by Abbey View Lock (number 11), a grade II listed building by which there is another pumping station and in quick succession Pulteney Lock (12) and Bath top Lock (13). Above the top lock the canal passes through Sydney Gardens where it passes through two tunnels and under two cast iron footbridges dating from 1800. Cleveland Tunnel is 173 feet long and runs under Cleveland House, the former headquarters of the Kennet and Avon Canal Company. This is now a grade II* listed building. Many of the bridges over the canal are also listed buildings.

== Southcot ==
Southcot Burial Ground is a small former cemetery, now owned by the Bath Preservation Trust, who manage it for its wildlife and heritage.
