= Widcombe Crescent, Bath =

Widcombe Crescent
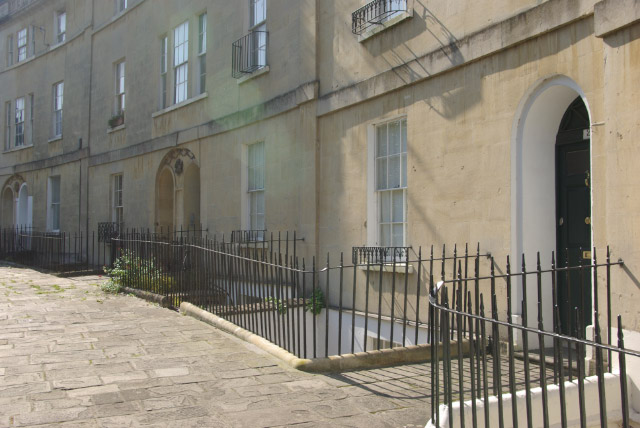

- Location within Somerset
- 51°22′30″N 2°20′59″W
- Location: Bath, Somerset, England

History
- Built: 1808

Site notes
- Architect: Thomas Baldwin
- Architectural style: Georgian

Listed Building – Grade I
- Official name: 1-14 (Consec) With Area Railings
- Designated: 12 June 1950
- Reference no.: 1395754

Widcombe Crescent in Bath, Somerset, England is a terrace of 14 Georgian houses built in 1808 by Thomas Baldwin, and designated a Grade I listed building.

The three-storey houses, which have mansard roofs, are stepped up from either side to central 2 houses which project slightly.

Famous residents include Sir James Brooke, the 'White Rajah' of Sarawak in Borneo, who lived in Number 1 from 1831–1834.

== See also ==
- List of Grade I listed buildings in Bath and North East Somerset
