= Newbridge, Bath =

Electoral ward in Bath, United Kingdom

Coordinates: 51.387°N 2.394°W

Newbridge
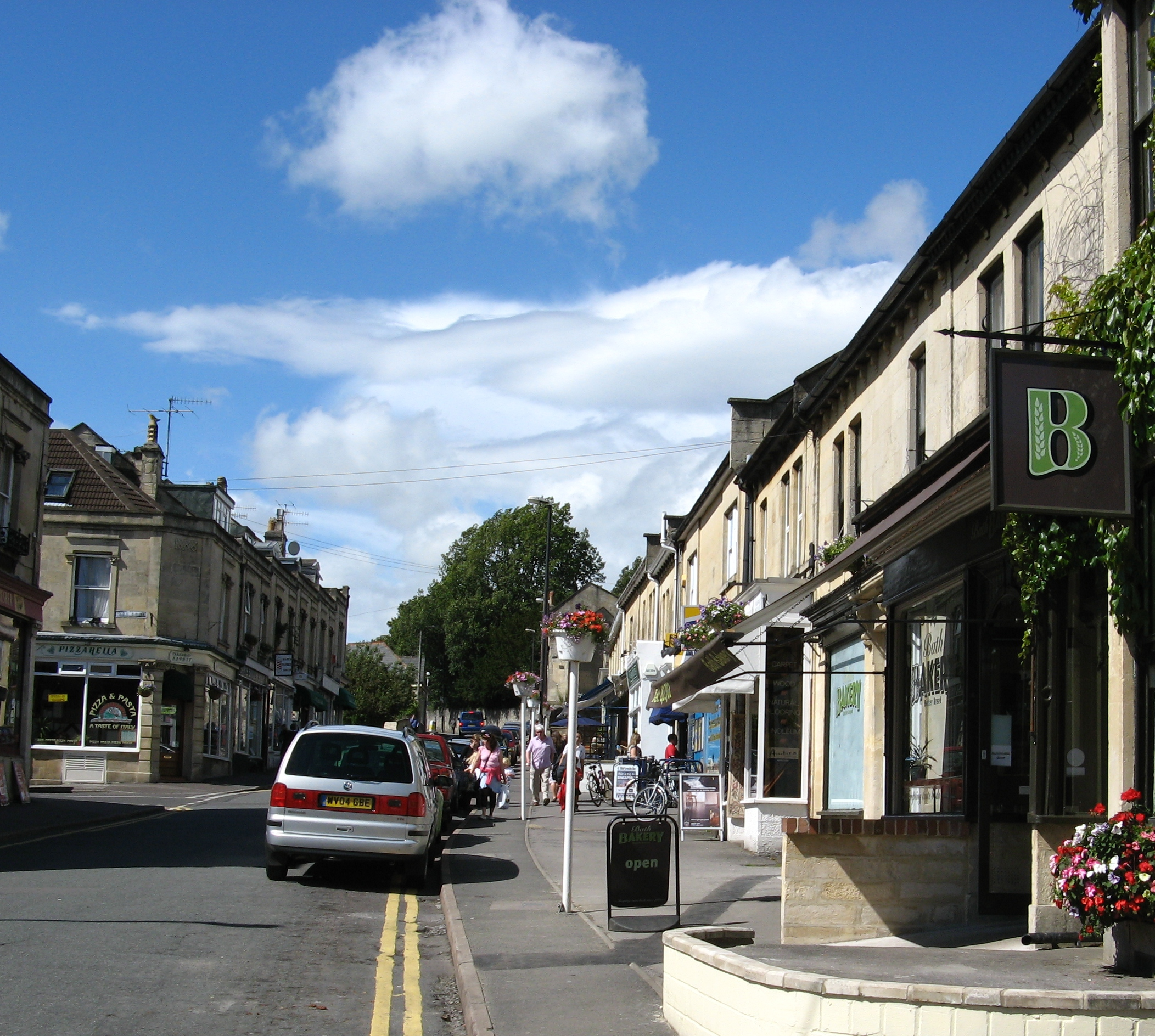
- Chelsea Road shopping area

- Location within Somerset
- Population: 6,641 (2021)
- OS grid reference: ST726655
- Unitary authority: Bath and North East Somerset
- Ceremonial county: Somerset
- Region: South West
- Country: England
- Sovereign state: United Kingdom
- Post town: BATH
- Postcode district: BA1
- Dialling code: 01225
- Police: Avon and Somerset
- Fire: Avon
- Ambulance: South Western
- UK Parliament: Bath

Newbridge is a largely residential area on the western edge of Bath, Somerset, England, which is named for the New Bridge built in 1734 to carry the Bristol-Bath road over the River Avon. An electoral ward of the same name extends into the city to include the Combe Park, Lower Weston and Locksbrook areas; and about 3 miles (5 km) north-west beyond the city boundary, taking in the rural parishes of Kelston and North Stoke. The parish population at the 2021 census was 6,641.

== History ==
=== The New Bridge ===
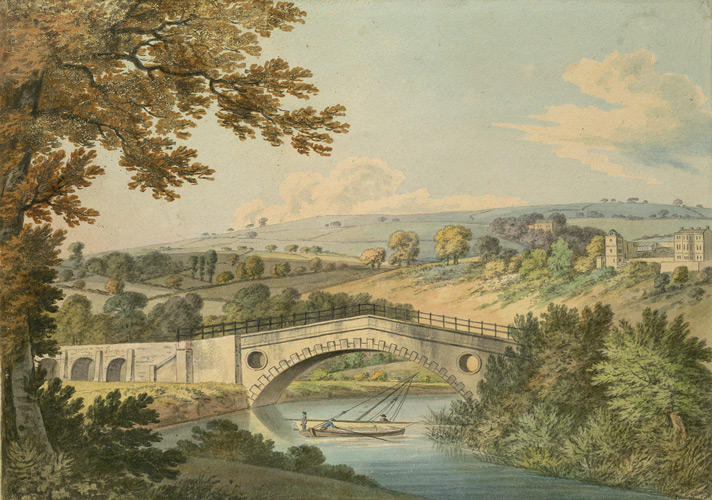
The New Bridge in 1806

The area is named after the New Bridge over the River Avon outside Bath, built in 1734 to replace a ford that was one of the last impediments to navigation between Bristol and Bath. The bridge had pierced spandrels and arches on either side to allow flood water to pass easily. The bridge was widened and improved in the 1830s to the version that now carries the A4 road from Bath to Bristol out of Newbridge.

=== Development as a suburb ===
The Weston Hotel was built circa 1890 close to Weston railway station, and was a prominent building at the Bath end of Newbridge Road. It is a four-storey building in the arts and crafts style, designed by architect William Frederick Unsworth, and was Grade II listed in 2011. It operated as a public house until 2019. This area was initially called Lower Weston as it was en route to Weston village, but is now the eastern end of Newbridge ward.

From about 1902 to 1939, a tram service from central Bath to Newton St Loe operated down Newbridge Road and across the bridge.

In 1915, Sidney Horstmann and his brothers built a large factory, Newbridge Works, in what was then the outskirts of Bath. The general engineering company, The Horstmann Gear Company, specialised in gas street lighting controls, time switches, gauges, and latterly central heating controls, used "Newbridge" as a trademark for some of its products. The factory closed in 2000, and the site was redeveloped for housing.

== Geography ==
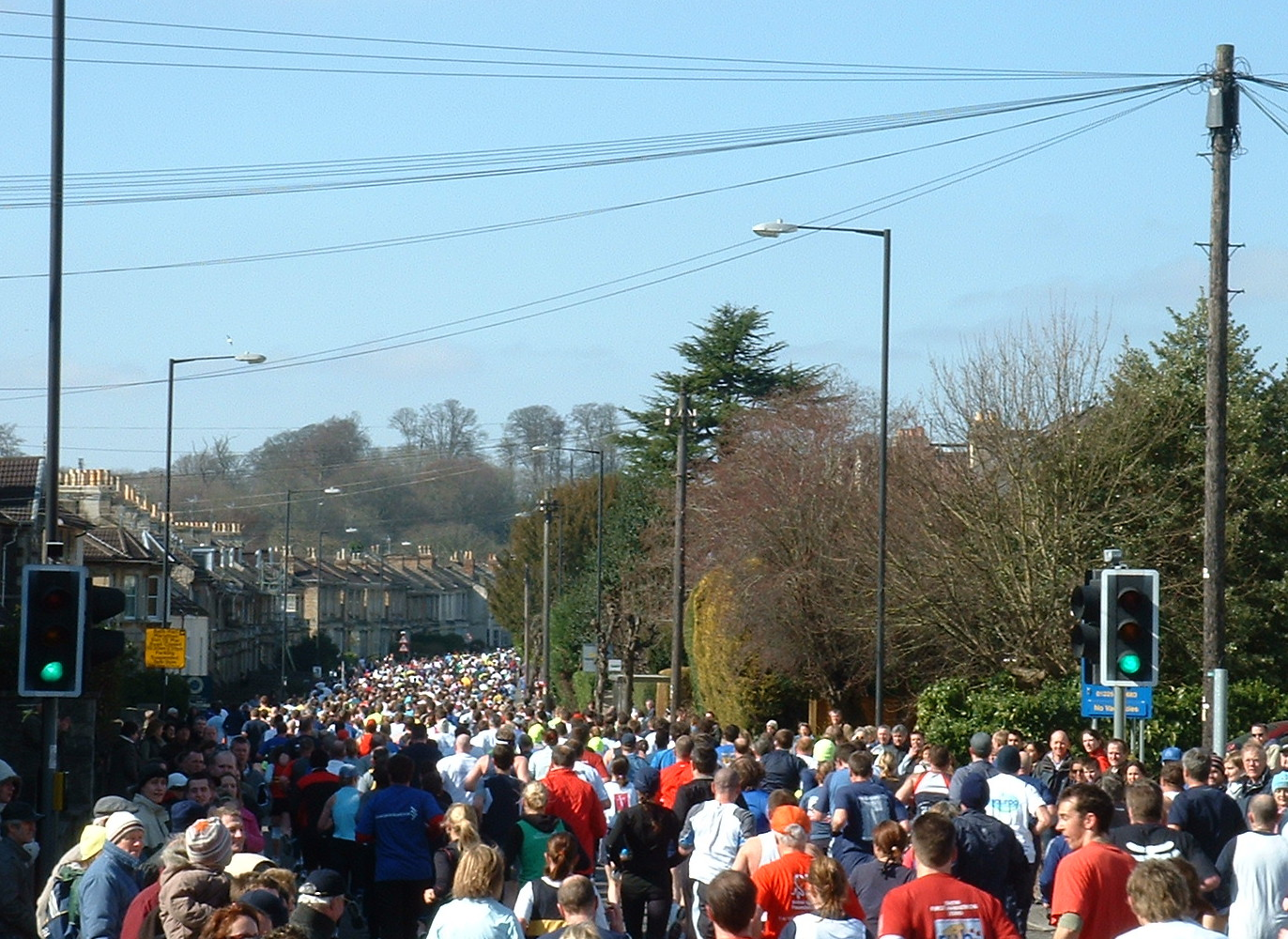
Runners in the 2006 Bath Half Marathon, on Newbridge Road

The Newbridge electoral ward can be divided into three areas from south to north:

- Locksbrook: an industrial and residential area between the River Avon and the former Mangotsfield and Bath branch line
- Newbridge: a largely residential area alongside and in between Newbridge Road (A4 road) and Newbridge Hill (A431 road), and also extending north-west alongside Penn Lea Road
- Combe Park: an area in the north-east of the ward consisting of the Royal United Hospital, Lansdown Cricket Club and residential housing alongside Combe Park road and Cedric Road.

The main shopping area in Newbridge is Chelsea Road, a small area of shops, restaurants and hairdressers. Shops include a bakery, a hardware shop, a supermarket, a cycle shop and nearby on Newbridge Road a post office.

Bath's major hospital, the Royal United Hospital, is in the north-east of the ward in Combe Park, bordering Weston village. Lansdown Cricket Club's ground is alongside the hospital. Weston Recreation Ground is in Newbridge ward.

Newbridge is the location of Partis College, which was built as large block of almshouses between 1825 and 1827. It is designated as a Grade I listed building.

The Bristol and Bath Railway Path, part of the National Cycle Network, runs westward from Newbridge to Bristol, and a continuation riverside cycle and footpath runs eastward into central Bath. Newbridge park and ride is just off the A4 road on the western edge of the ward, alongside the Newbridge Meadows village green.

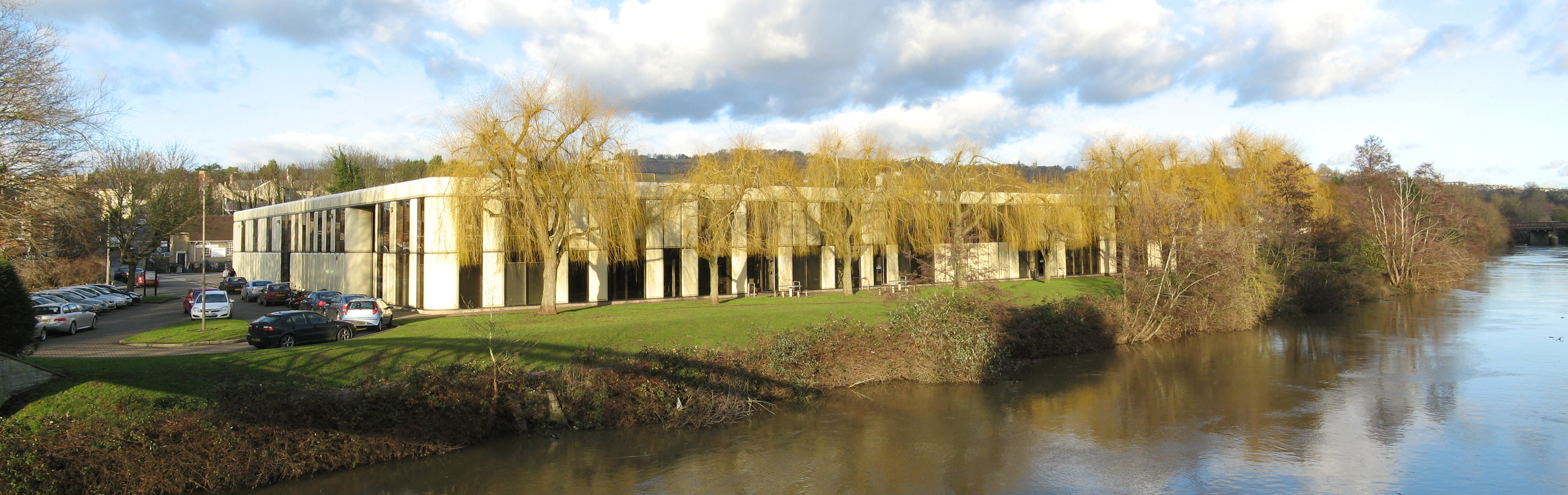
The Herman Miller factory in 2011, which became the Bath School of Art and Design in 2019

In 2019, the Bath School of Art and Design, part of Bath Spa University, moved into its new Locksbrook campus in the former Herman Miller furniture factory, a 1970s listed building designed by Farrell & Grimshaw.

Since boundary changes effected at the elections held on 2 May 2019, the ward now also includes two civil parishes outside the city boundary: Kelston and North Stoke. It also expanded a little way eastward into Kingsmead ward, including bringing Locksbrook Cemetery into the ward. The ward elects two members to Bath and North East Somerset Council.

== Schools ==
Educationally, Newbridge is part of the North West Bath area of Bath and North East Somerset. This area has three primary schools and one secondary school, Oldfield School, although at secondary school level, many of the girls from the Newbridge area attend Hayesfield Girls' School and many of the boys attend Beechen Cliff School.

== See also ==
- Fairfield House, Bath
- Minerva Bath Rowing Club
- Weston Lock
