= Bathwick =

Electoral ward in Bath, England

Coordinates: 51.3880°N 2.3534°W

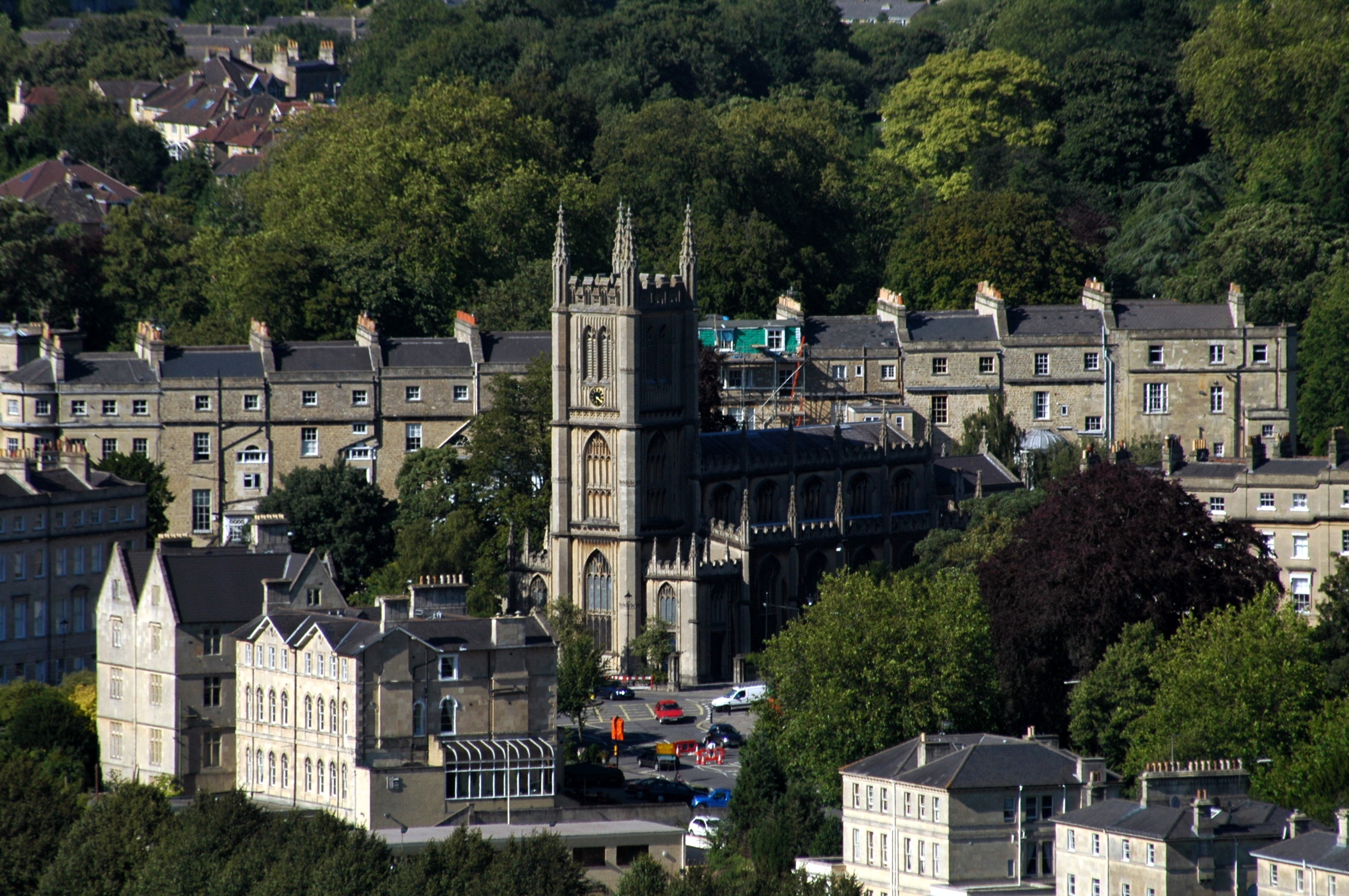
- St Mary the Virgin's Church as viewed from Beechen Cliff

- Location within Somerset
- Population: 4,863 (2011.Ward)
- OS grid reference: ST755655
- Unitary authority: Bath and North East Somerset
- Ceremonial county: Somerset
- Region: South West
- Country: England
- Sovereign state: United Kingdom
- Post town: BATH
- Postcode district: BA2
- Dialling code: 01225
- Police: Avon and Somerset
- Fire: Avon
- Ambulance: South Western
- UK Parliament: Bath

Bathwick is an area and electoral ward in the city of Bath, in the Bath and North East Somerset district, in the ceremonial county of Somerset, England, on the opposite bank of the River Avon to the historic city centre.

The district became part of the Bath urban area with the 18th century development of the Pulteney estate and the building of Pulteney Bridge. Subsequently, various Georgian streets were built including Henrietta Street, Sydney Place, Great Pulteney Street and Laura Place, with Bathwick Hill leading up to Claverton Down and the University of Bath.

It is also home to the Holburne Museum of Art within Sydney Gardens, Bath Recreation Ground (The Home of Premiership, Bath Rugby) and The North Parade Ground, the current home to Bath Cricket Club and Bath City's first ever ground from 1889 to 1891.

Bathwick has two churches: St John the Baptist, Bathwick and St Mary the Virgin, Bathwick. The latter was built in the early 19th century by John Pinch the Elder, and was where the band Muse recorded the organ sections on their second studio album Origin of Symmetry.

== Governance ==
Bathwick was part of the hundred of Bath Forum. In 1891 the civil parish had a population of 4714. On 26 March 1900 the parish was abolished to form Bath.

== See also ==
- Batman rapist
