= Lansdown, Bath =

Suburb of Bath, England

Coordinates: 51.395°N 2.365°W

Lansdown
- Suburb
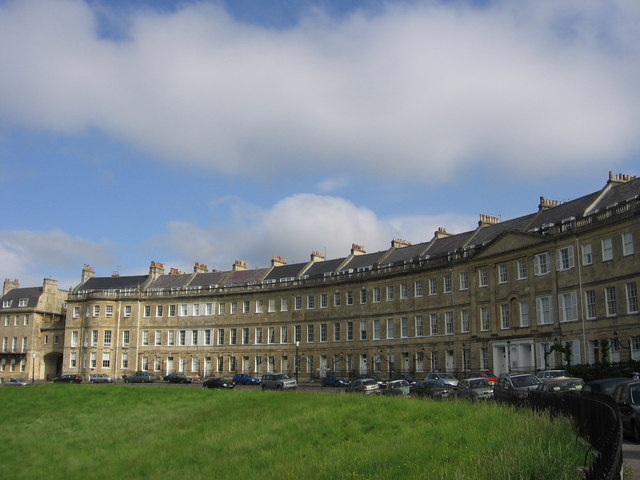
- Lansdown Crescent

- Location within Somerset
- Population: 4,589 (2011, ward)
- OS grid reference: ST747662
- Unitary authority: Bath and North East Somerset
- Ceremonial county: Somerset
- Region: South West
- Country: England
- Sovereign state: United Kingdom
- Post town: Bath
- Police: Avon and Somerset
- Fire: Avon
- Ambulance: South Western
- UK Parliament: Bath

Lansdown is a suburb of the World Heritage City of Bath, England, that extends northwards from the city centre up a road of the same name. Among its most distinctive architectural features are Lansdown Crescent and Sion Hill Place, which includes a campus of Bath Spa University.

Beckford's Tower, an architectural folly built in neo-classical style for William Thomas Beckford in 1827, stands on high ground at the northern edge of the suburb, overlooking Lansdown Cemetery.

== Lansdown Hill ==
Lansdown Road climbs north-west through the suburb and continues into open land in Charlcombe parish, past a park-and-ride facility and playing fields to the Lansdown Hill area. Here (outside the city boundary) are Lansdown hamlet, Bath Racecourse, and Lansdown Golf Course.

The Battle of Lansdowne (1643) was fought in the vicinity and is commemorated by Sir Bevil Grenville's Monument (1720) on Lansdown Hill.

== Cricket club ==
Lansdown Cricket Club, founded in 1825 and the oldest club in Somerset, originally played at a ground called "Cricket Down" next to the original racecourse on the top of Lansdown Hill and close to Beckford's Tower (the current Bath Racecourse is about a mile to the west); later the club moved into Bath at the Sydenham Field, and when that was built over by the Midland Railway in 1869, it moved to its current ground adjacent to the Royal United Hospital at Combe Park, which is in Lower Weston.

== See also ==
- Lansdowne (disambiguation)
