= Chronology of Haile Selassie =

This is a chronology of the lifetime of Ethiopian Emperor Haile Selassie (reigned from 1930 to 1974).

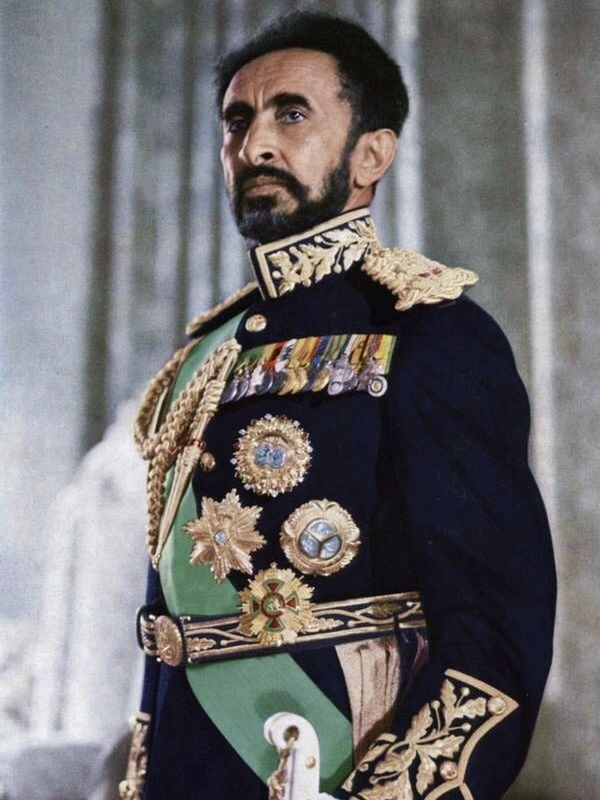
Haile Selassie in full dress, 1970

== 1892–1930 ==
- 23 July 1892 – Haile Selassie (as Ras Tafari) was born from Ras Mekonnen Woldemikael and Woizero Yeshimebet Ali Abba Jifar.
- 1 November 1905 – Tafari was renamed as Dejazmach at the age of 13.
- 1906 – His father Ras Mikael died at Kulibi.
- 1906 – Tafari assumed nominal governorship of Selale, enabled him to continue his studies.
- 1907 – He was appointed as governor over part of the province of Sidamo.
- 1907 – Following his death of his brother Yelma, the governorate of Harar was left vacant, which left to Menelik's loyal general Balcha Safo.
- 1910/1911 – Tafari appointed as governor of Harar.
- 3 August 1911 – Tafari married to Menen Asfaw from Ambassel, the niece of the heir to throne Lij Iyasu.
- 1916 – Empress Zewditu made Tafari Ras and was made heir apparent and Crown Prince.
- 11 February 1917 – During the coronation of Zewditu, she pledged Regent Tafari to rule fairly.
- 1924 – Ras Tafari toured numerous countries: Jerusalem, Alexandria, Paris, Luxembourg, Brussels, Amsterdam, Stockholm, London, Geneva, and Athens.
- 1928 – When Dejazmach Balcha Safo went to Addis Ababa with considerable size of forces, Tafari consolidated his hold over the provinces, many of Menelik's appointees refused to abide the new regulations.
- 18 February 1928 – As Balcha Safo went to Addis Ababa, Tafari had Ras Kassa Haile Darge buy off his army and arranged to have him displaced as the shum of Sidamo Province, by Birru Wolde Gabriel who himself was replaced by Desta Damtew.
- 2 August 1928 – the Italo-Ethiopian Treaty was signed to foster favorable relations between the two countries.
- 7 October 1928 – Empress Zewditu crowned Tafari as Negus.
- 31 March 1930 – Gugsa Welle was defeated by loyal forces of Tafari during the Battle of Anchem.
- 2 April 1930 – Death of Zewditu; Tafari rose to power as Emperor of Ethiopia.
- 2 November 1930 – Ras Tafari crowned as Haile Selassie I at Addis Ababa's St. George"s Cathedral.

== 1930–1974 ==
- 16 July 1931 – Emperor Haile Selassie introduced the first Constitution of Ethiopia, providing bicameral legislature.
- 5 December 1934 – the Italians initially invaded Ethiopia at Welwel, in Ogaden; Haile Selassie armies set up headquarters at Dessie in Wollo Province.
- 3 October 1935 – the Second Italo-Ethiopian War began.
- 19 October 1935 – Haile Selassie gave more precise orders for his army to his Commander-in-Chief Ras Kassa.
- 2 May 1936 – Haile Selassie appointed Ras Imru Haile Selassie as Prince Regent in his absence, departing with his family for French Somaliland.
- 30 June 1936 – Haile Selassie appealed to the League of Nations address the invasion.
- 1936–1941 – Haile Selassie lived in Bath, England, in Fairfield House, which he bought.
- 18 January 1941 – during the East African Campaign in World War II, Haile Selassie crossed the border between Sudan and Ethiopia near the village of Um Idda.
- 5 May 1941 – Haile Selassie entered Addis Ababa and reclaimed his throne after leaving for five years since Italian occupation, and address the Ethiopian populace.
- 27 August 1942 – Haile Selassie abolished slavery in Ethiopia.
- 1942 – Haile Selassie attempted to institute a progressive tax scheme.
- 2 December 1950 – the UN General Assembly adopted Resolution 390 (V), establishing the former Italian colony into Ethiopia.
- 4 November 1955 – the revised 1955 Constitution of Ethiopia adopted with unitary parliamentary constitutional monarchy scheme.
- 1958 – the famine of Tigray unveiled to Ministry of the Interior two years later, which contributed significant deaths.
- 1959 – Haile Selassie played a role of the autocephaly of the Ethiopian Orthodox Tewahedo Church from Coptic Orthodox Church.
- 13 December 1960 – a coup d'état was attempted against Haile Selassie during state visiting Brazil despite successfully suppressed by his loyal Kebur Zabagna army.
- 2 December 1950 – The federation of Eritrea with Ethiopia had stipulated under UN Resolution 390 (V).
- 1961 – Eritrean War of Independence began, followed by the dissolution of the federation and closing of Eritrean parliament.
- 25 May 1963 – Haile Selassie formed the Organization of African Unity (OAU) headquartered in Addis Ababa.
- 1964 – Haile Selassie would initiate the concept of the United States of Africa, a proposition later taken up by Muammar Gaddafi.
- 1966 – Haile Selassie attempted to replace the historical tax system with a single progressive income tax, which weakened the nobility which previously avoided to pay taxes.
- 1960s – 1970s – Students Marxism revolution took place among educated people with radical and left-wing sentiments to oppose Haile Selassie feudal administration.
- 1972 – 1974 – the Wollo–Tigray famine killed about 40,000 to 80,000 Ethiopians. Haile Selassie was criticized for not reporting these famines.
- 12 January 1974 – the Ethiopian Revolution began when Ethiopian soldiers began rebellion in Negele Borena.
- 27 February 1974 – Prime Minister Aklilu Habte-Wold resigned as a result from mutiny. He installed the liberal aristocrat Endelkachew Mekonnen as a new Prime Minister.
- June 1974 – The Coordinating Committee of the Armed Forces, also known as the Derg formed to topple Haile Selassie government.
- 12 September 1974 – Haile Selassie was deposed by the Derg's General Aman Andom at the age of 82. He was subsequently imprisoned at National Palace in Addis Ababa.
- 27 August 1975 – Haile Selassie died and pronounced on state media one day later on 28 August from "respiratory failure" following complications from prostate examination followed up by a prostate operation.
- 17 February 1992 – After the fall of the Derg in 1991, Haile Selassie's bones were found under a concrete slab on the palace grounds.
- 5 November 2000 – State funeral of Haile Selassie took place at Holy Trinity Cathedral in Addis Ababa.
