= Church of St Mary, Swainswick =

Historic church in Somerset, England

Church of St Mary
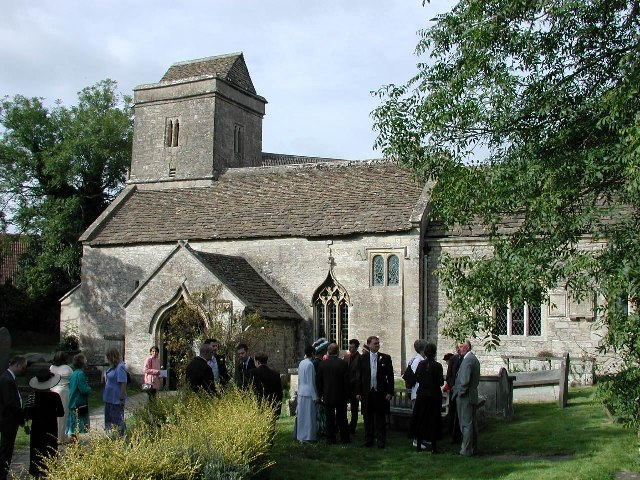

- St Mary's location in Somerset
- 51°24′51″N 2°21′05″W
- Location: Swainswick, Somerset
- Country: England
- Denomination: Church of England
- Churchmanship: Central
- Website: www.swainswickchurch.org.uk

History
- Status: Active
- Dedication: St Mary the Virgin

Architecture
- Functional status: Parish church
- Heritage designation: Grade II*
- Designated: 1 February 1956
- Years built: 12th century

Administration
- Province: Province of Canterbury
- Diocese: Diocese of Bath and Wells

Clergy
- Rector: Reverend Rob Densmore

The Anglican Church of St Mary in Swainswick within the English county of Somerset dates from the 12th century. It is a Grade II* listed building.

Vestiges of the original 12th-century building can still be seen around the doorway in the south wall. However, much of the fabric is from the 14th century, when the three stage square tower and porch were added. Various alterations were made over the centuries, and a major Victorian restoration, by Charles Edward Davis, included rebuilding of the chancel.

The church contains monuments to the parents of William Prynne, the Puritan parliamentarian, who was born in the village in 1600. There is a ledger slab of John Wood the Elder, architect of Georgian Bath. In the nave is the Royal coat of arms of Charles I.

The parish is part of the benefice of Swainswick with Woolley within the Diocese of Bath and Wells.
