= Bog Island =

Open space in Bath, England

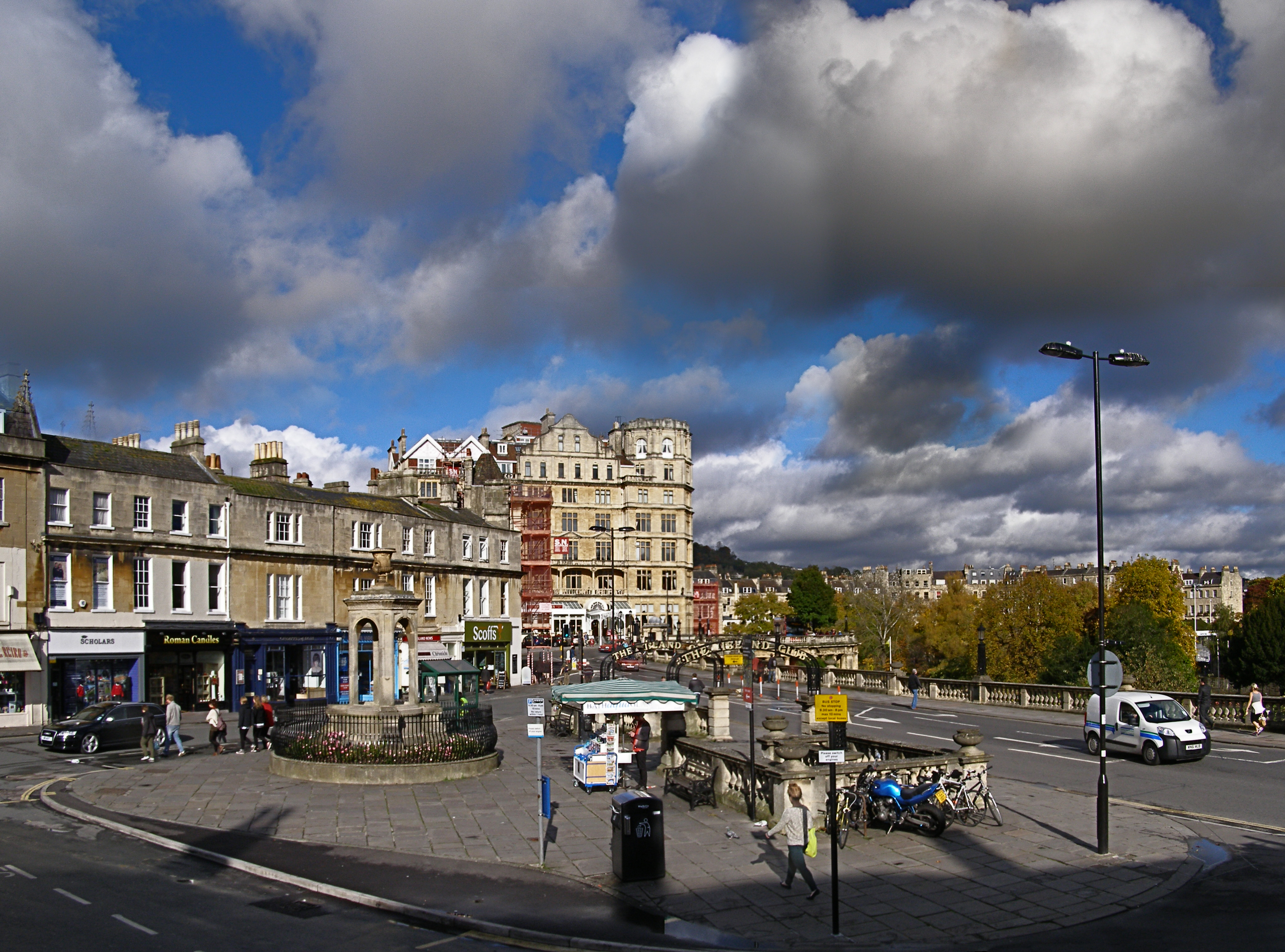
- Bog Island in 2013, looking north from North Parade
- Interactive map of Bog Island
- Location: Bath, Somerset, England
- Coordinates: 51.38106°N 2.35750°W
- North: Terrace Walk
- East: Pierrepont Street
- South: North Parade
- West: Terrace Walk

Construction
- Completion: c. 1934 (92 years ago)

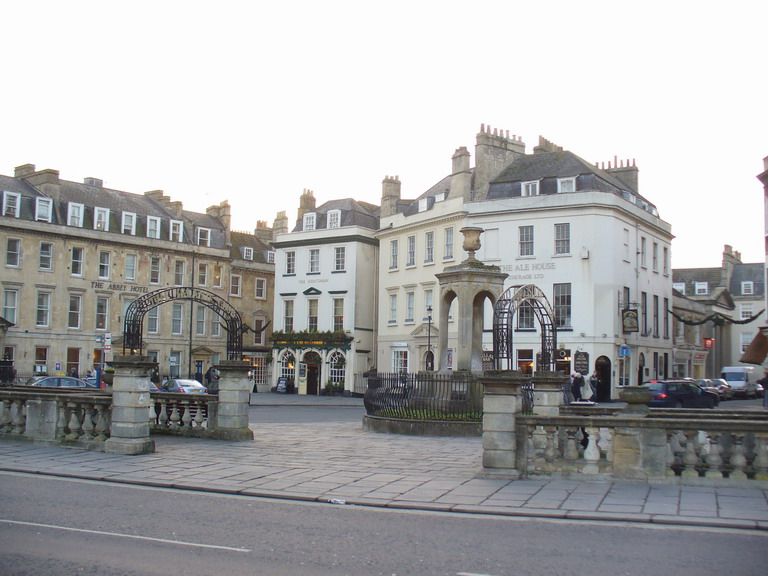
The entrances to the underground section and the Pieroni fountain, looking west from Pierrepont Street

Bog Island is a small public square in Bath, England. Constructed around 1934, it is named for the subterranean public toilets which used to exist there. They were converted into a nightclub, The Island Club, in the late 1970s. It too closed, due to its being unsafe, in the 1990s.

The island, which stands on the former site of Bath's Assembly Rooms, is bounded by Terrace Walk to the north and west, Pierrepont Street to the east and North Parade to the south. It stands across Pierrepont Street from the southern edge of the Parade Gardens, beside the River Avon.

A fountain, named for its sculptor, Stefano Vallerio Pieroni, stands just west of the square's centre.

Part of an underground ancient drain which carried Bath's hot spring water from the Roman Baths to the Avon was runs Bog Island.
