= Church of St Mary, Charlcombe =

Church in Somerset, England

Church of St Mary
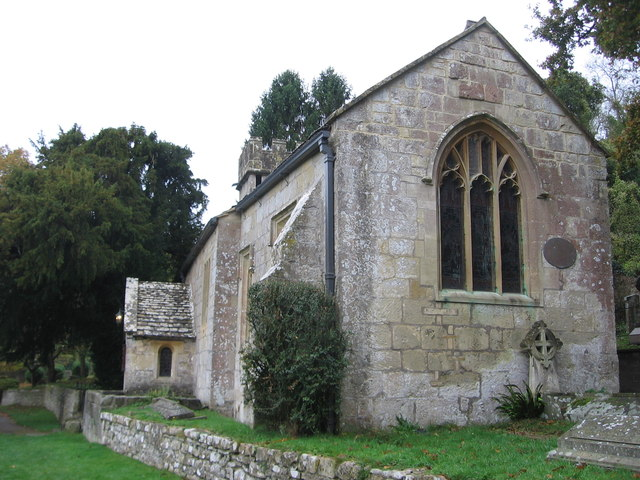

- Location within Somerset
- 51°24′16″N 2°21′46″W
- Location: Charlcombe, Somerset, England

History
- Built: 12th century

Listed Building – Grade II*
- Designated: 1 February 1956
- Reference no.: 1214255

The Anglican Church of St Mary in Charlcombe within the English county of Somerset was built in the 12th century. It is a Grade II* listed building.

The church dates from the 12th century. It underwent Victorian restoration between 1857 and 1861. The work was probably carried out by James Wilson from plans drawn up by George Gilbert Scott.

There is believed to be a holy well in the grounds. Charlcombe was formerly the mother church of Bath. In acknowledgment of this Bath Abbey sent a pound of pepper on an annual basis. In 1734 Henry Fielding got married in the church.

Above the nave is a small bell turret. Inside the church is a font which is as old as the church itself.

The parish is part of the benefice of Charlcombe with St Stephen's Church, Bath within the Diocese of Bath and Wells.

== See also ==
- List of ecclesiastical parishes in the Diocese of Bath and Wells
