= St Mary Magdalene's Church, Langridge =

Church in Somerset, England

St Mary Magdalene's Church
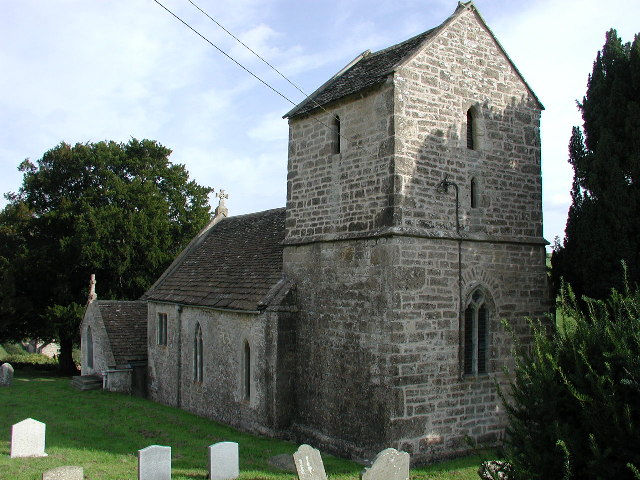

- Location within Somerset
- 51°25′26″N 2°22′05″W
- Location: Charlcombe, Somerset, England

History
- Built: 12th century

Listed Building – Grade I
- Official name: Church of St Mary Magdalene
- Designated: 1 February 1956
- Reference no.: 1214262

St Mary Magdalene's Church at Langridge in the parish of Charlcombe, Somerset, England dates from the 12th century and has been designated as a Grade I listed building. It was restored by James Wilson between 1857 and 1861.

There is a small nave and a two-stage Norman tower. Also Norman are the chancel arch (restored 1870) and south doorway. Above the chancel arch is a rare figure of the Virgin and Child, described by English Heritage as 13th-century, but by the church guidebook as "probably 11th century". The apse was added by Charles Edward Davis, the Bath City Architect, between 1869 and 1872.

In the nave are various monuments and memorials. A 37-inch (94 cm) brass of Elizabeth Walsche, who died in 1441, depicted in widow's weeds, was stolen in 2002. Another monument, this one in stone, to the same woman remains. Other members of the family also commemorated including a brass dating from 1790 which was drawn by Samuel Hieronymus Grimm.

The parish is part of the benefice of Weston, Bath All Saints with North Stoke and Langridge within the deanery of Bath.

== See also ==
- Grade I listed buildings in Bath and North East Somerset
- List of Somerset towers
- List of ecclesiastical parishes in the Diocese of Bath and Wells
