= Old Police Station, Bath =

Grade II listed building in Bath, England

Old Police Station
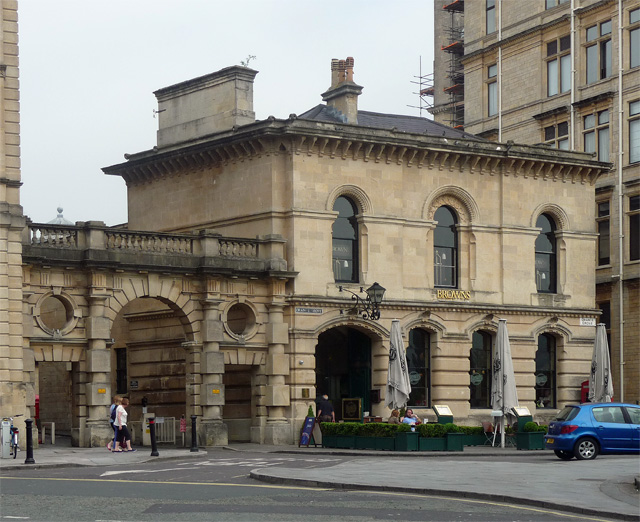
- The building (and adjacent archway) in 2012

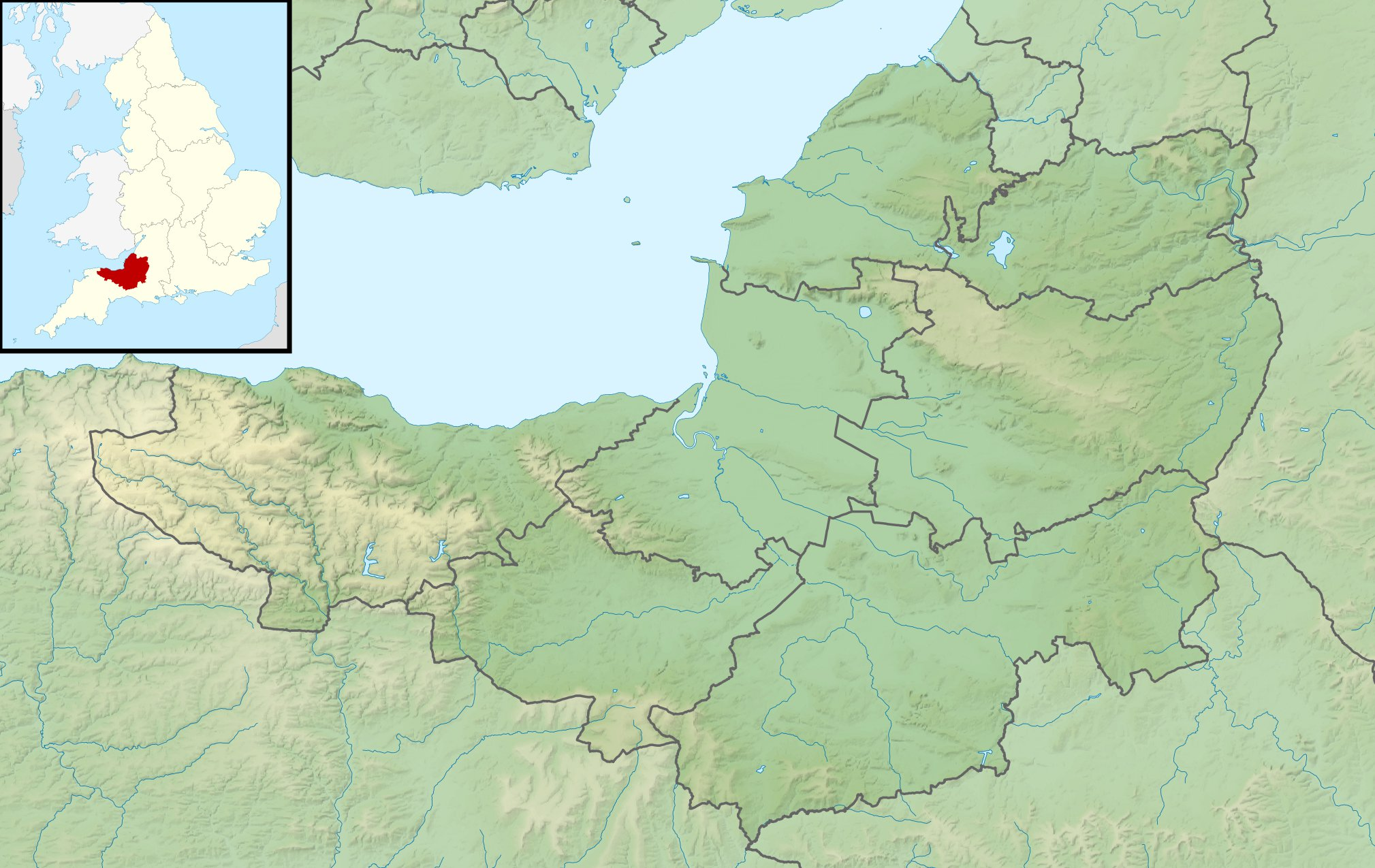
- Location within Somerset
- 51.381979°N 2.358169°W
- Location: Orange Grove, Bath, Somerset, BA2 4DF

History
- Built: 1865 (161 years ago)

Site notes
- Architect: Charles Edward Davis
- Architectural style: Neo-classical

Listed Building – Grade II
- Official name: Bath Old City Police Station
- Reference no.: 1394212
- Police station
- Category: Law Enforcement

The Old Police Station is a Grade II listed building in Bath, Somerset, England. Completed in 1865, to a design by Charles Edward Davis, it stands in Orange Grove, adjacent (to the southwest) to Bath's Empire Hotel, although it pre-dates that building by around fifty years. The police station opened on 19 January 1866.

A 19th-century archway connecting the building to the rear of the adjacent (to the southwest) Guildhall, in which the police station was formerly located, is also listed.

The building, which contains a garage for one fire engine, is two storeys high and three bays wide. It became disused when the police station moved to Manvers Street in the 1970s. It became a restaurant in 1998.

Today, the building is the home of Browns Bar & Brasserie.

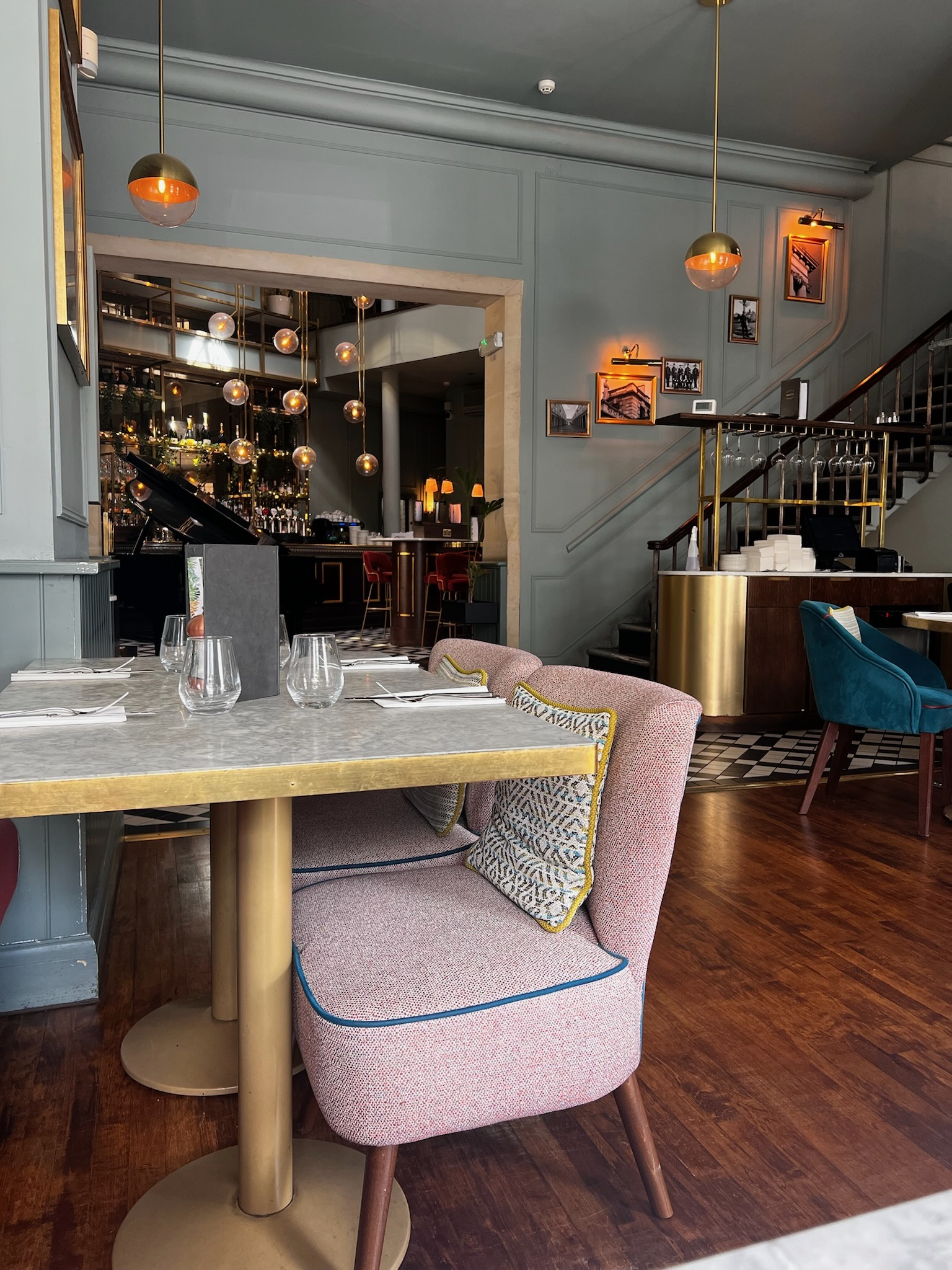
Part of the interior, pictured in 2024
