= Excavation of Haile Selassie's remains =

1992 discovery of Ethiopian Emperor Haile Selassie's remains

On 17 February 1992, the Ethiopian Radio announced the discovery of the remains of the Ethiopian Emperor Haile Selassie beneath his office in National Palace by workmen. The discovery happened nearly one year after the former military government Derg collapsed in 1991, and under the interim government led by the Ethiopian People's Revolutionary Democratic Front (EPRDF).

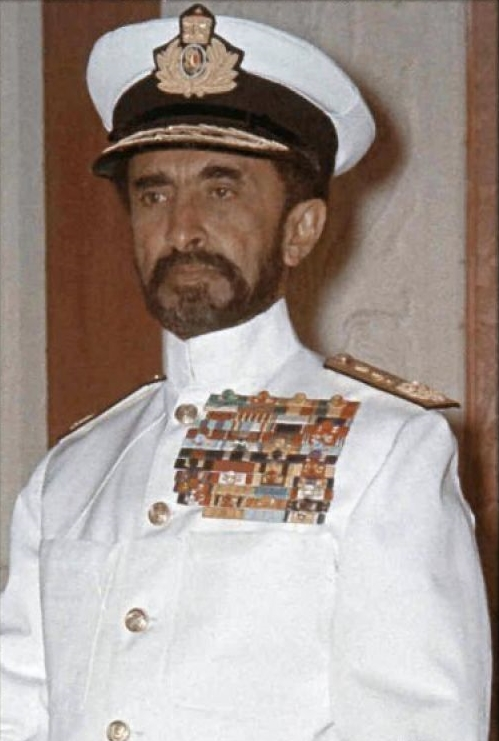
Haile Selassie c. 1965

Speculation arose around the circumstances of his death in 1975, and mostly centered on the alleged assassination plot by the Derg under Mengistu Haile Mariam. His remains were temporarily kept in the Ba'ata Mariam Church near the tomb of Menelik II, lying in a glass-fronted case in the perfumed crypt until his burial ceremony took place on 23 July, the 100th anniversary of the Emperor's birth. He was reburied at Holy Trinity Cathedral in Addis Ababa on 5 November 2000.

== Background ==
The Ethiopian Revolution ended with a coup d'état of Emperor Haile Selassie in September 1974 by a coordinated military junta known as the Derg, headed by chairman Aman Andom. On 27 August 1975, Haile Selassie reportedly died after being detained in house arrest at National Palace under unknown circumstances. There was also speculation that Haile Selassie had complications during a medical procedure. Another theory was that Haile Selassie was killed by Marxist army officers by strangulation at his bed. Similar allegations speculated that he was suffocated with a pillow by an assassin employed by the Derg government under Mengistu Haile Mariam's leadership.

The Derg radio newscast said that he had been found dead at his bed by a servant, and announced his cause of death as complications from a prostate operation, which he had undergone two months prior. Official sources said that the burial of the Emperor would be "in strictest privacy". In the 2006 court trial, 67 former members of the Derg said that the Emperor's opponents had met on 23 August 1975 "and with complete premeditation resolved that His Imperial Majesty Haile Selassie should be strangled because he was head of the feudal system." The charge added that he was strangled on 26 August in his bed.

== Event ==
On 17 February 1992, the Ethiopian Radio announced the remains of Ethiopian Emperor Haile Selassie were exhumed from beneath his office in the National Palace by workmen. This happened almost a year after the collapse of the Derg regime and the power of the Ethiopian People's Revolutionary Democratic Front (EPRDF). His remains were kept in the Ba'ata Mariam Church near the tomb of Menelik II, lying in a glass-fronted box on a shelf in the perfumed crypt until the burial ceremony took place on 23 July, the 100th anniversary of his birth. Mengistu Haile Mariam was widely suspected in the involvement of the covert burial. Forensic examination was expected to determine the cause of death of the Emperor despite the burial ceremony that was set up spontaneously.

His monarchist supporters as well as family members alleged that he was killed by Mengistu and his six army officers, a claim reiterated by several exiled prominent people during the reign of the Derg. The government of Ethiopia under transitional government did not find corroborating evidence for a murder charge at the time. A forensic examination took his skull's jaw bone and teeth to test whether the Emperor was murdered. According to officials close to Mengistu, they had seen the Emperor in healthy condition and had not shown fear of being murdered in the night before his death. Likewise, Eshetu Tekle Mariam reiterated similar assertions that the Emperor was in good condition before a valet found him dead. The valet said he found his body lying with his face off his bed, after being alerted by the stench from the rot. Haile Selassie was reburied at the Holy Trinity Cathedral in Addis Ababa on 5 November 2000 carried by a small coffin.
