= 1928 Ethiopian coup attempt =

Coup d'état attempt between Ras Tafari and Empress Zewditu

1928 Ethiopian coup d'état attempt
- Part of Gugsa Wale's rebellion
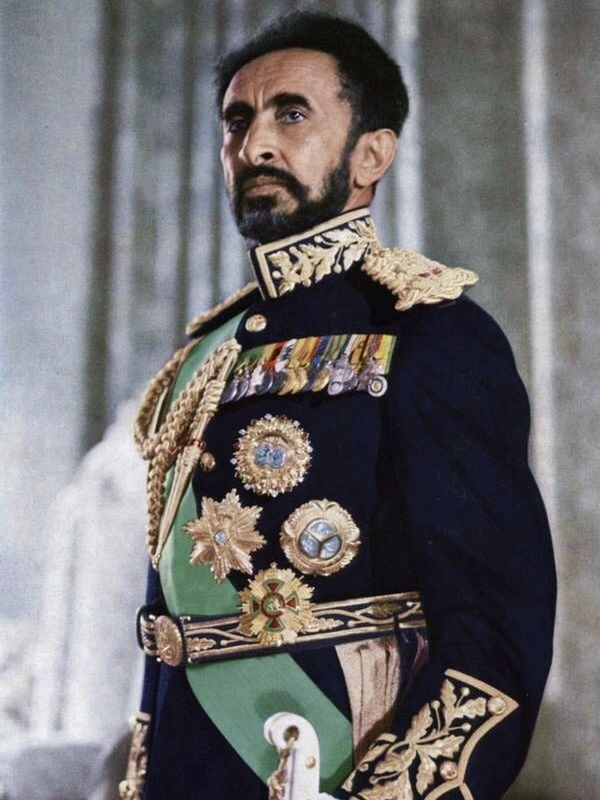
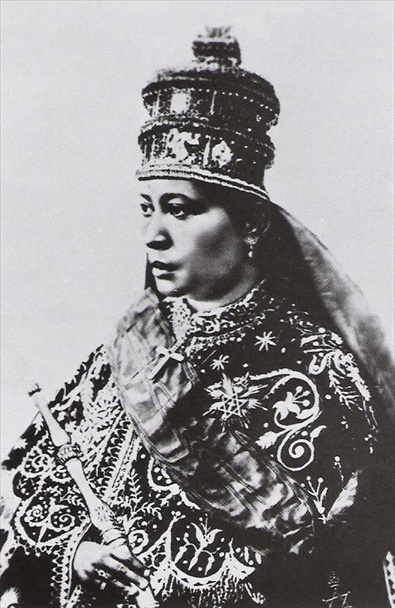
- Ras Tafari (Haile Selassie) (left) and Empress Zewditu (right), the two leaders of the coup attempt
- Date: September 1928
- Location: Menelik's Mausoleum, Addis Ababa, Ethiopia
- Goals: Toppling the Crown Prince Ras Tafari Makonnen
- Methods: Encirclement
- Result: Coup unsuccessful Ras Tafari's soldiers overwhelmingly encircled Zewditu's guards

Lead figures
Crown Prince Ras Tafari	Empress Zewditu

The 1928 Ethiopian coup d'état attempt was orchestrated by supporters of Empress (Note: Negesta Nagastat, roughly equivalent to Queen of Kings or Empress regnant.) Zewditu to rid her of the heir apparent and Crown Prince, Ras (Note: Roughly equivalent to Duke.) Tafari Makonnen. (Note: Inderase, equivalent to Regent.) With Tafari gone, Zewditu would be the sole ruler of the Ethiopian Empire (Mangista Ityop'p'ya).

== Events ==
In September 1928, in Addis Ababa, a group of palace reactionaries made a final bid to rid the Empress of Tafari. The group included some of Zewditu's courtiers. The attempted coup d'état was tragic in its origins and comic in its end.

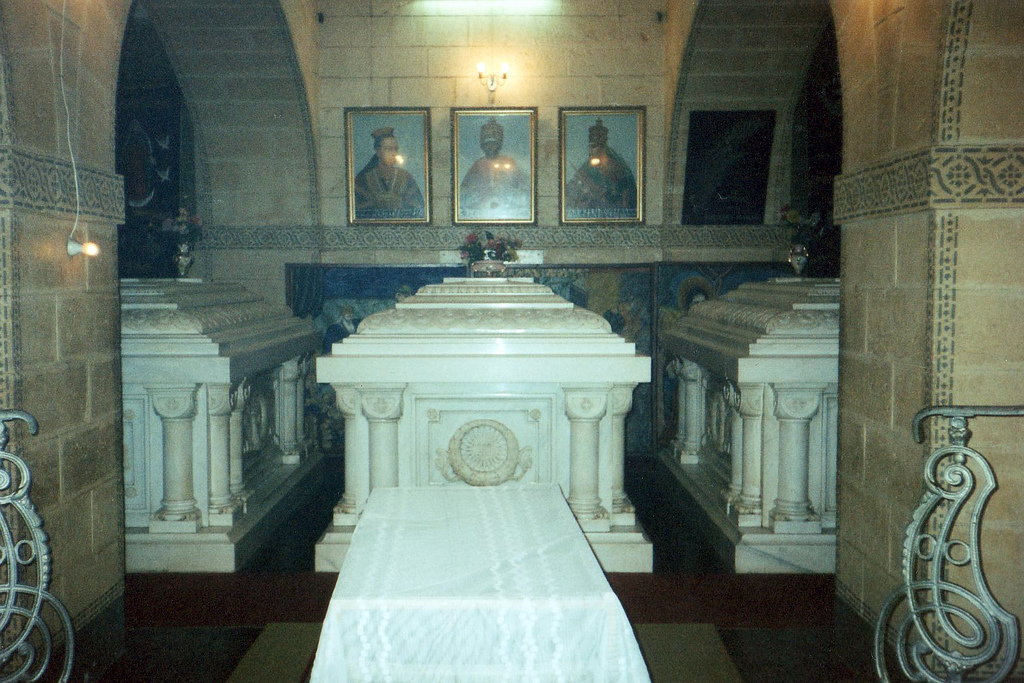
Menelik's Mausoleum, where the coup attempt occurred. (Note: In 1928, the crypts of Menelik (center), and Taytu Betul (left) would have been in place. Zewditu's crypt (right) was added later.)

When confronted by Tafari and a company of troops, the ringleaders of the coup took refuge on the palace grounds in Menelik's mausoleum. Tafari and his men surrounded them only to be surrounded themselves by the personal guard of Zewditu. More of Tafari's khaki clad soldiers arrived and surrounded Zewditu's guard. Tafari's soldiers were equipped with newly imported rifles, machine guns, small cannon, and an obsolete but menacing tank. The tank, a Fiat 3000, had been a gift to Empress Zewditu from the Duke of Abruzzi of Italy during a visit some years earlier. (Note: According to Time Magazine, Menen Asfaw herself commandeered the tank and came to the aid of her husband.)

In the end, the superiority of arms of the forces supporting Tafari decided the outcome in his favor.

== See also ==
- List of coups d'état and coup attempts
- Balcha Safo
- Gugsa Wale's rebellion

== Notes ==
Footnotes

Citations
