= Lam Brook =

Stream in south west England

Lam Brook Lambroc - Anglo-Saxon
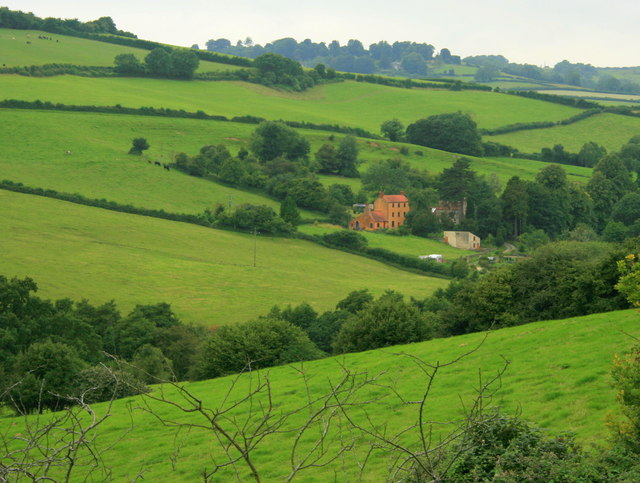
- Mill Farm on the upper reaches of the Lam Brook

Location
- Country: England
- Region: West of England
- Municipality: Bath

Physical characteristics
- Source
  - location: Lansdown Hill, Somerset, England
  - coordinates: 51.4175°N 2.3926°W
  - elevation: 656 ft (200 m)
- 3rd source: St Johns Wood
  - location: Toghill, South Gloucestershire, England
  - coordinates: 51.4467°N 2.3883°W
  - elevation: 580 ft (180 m)
- Mouth: Bristol Avon
  - location: Lambridge, Bath, England
  - coordinates: 51.3955°N 2.3393°W
  - elevation: 60 ft (18 m)
- Length: 2.5 mi (4.0 km), southerly

Basin features
- River system: Bristol Avon

The Lam Brook is a stream in the West Country of England, which rises in a number of springs on the southern end of the Cotswold Hills and runs in a generally southerly direction for approximately 2.5 miles (4.0 km) before joining the river Avon at Lambridge in Bath. The brook is mentioned in an Anglo-Saxon charter of indeterminate date. There is evidence of watermills in the Swainswick valley but no working examples survive. The waters are relatively clean and support a variety of wildlife including the rare white-clawed crayfish.

== Course ==
Streams from a number of springs issuing from the southern end of the Cotswold Hills at Lansdown Hill in Somerset, and Toghill and Cold Ashton in South Gloucestershire converge at Ashcombe Farm near Langridge, Somerset. The Lam Brook then runs in a generally southerly direction past Ashcombe House and the villages of Upper Swainswick and Lower Swainswick. At Lambridge the stream is joined by an unnamed tributary on the right bank just before joining the Bristol Avon.

== History ==
It is believed that the Roman Fosse Way forded the brook near the present Lambridge. Lam Brook is mentioned in an Anglo-Saxon charter as forming part of the boundaries of the village of Charlcombe. No date has yet been determined for this document. In common with many other local rivers, watermills were constructed, especially in the Swainswick valley and at Lambridge. Mill Farm at Woolley survives but has been converted to other uses. A lease of 1275 refers to "two fulling mills with all appurtenances at Lambrugge ..." and a 1729 map records "Dead Mill" a little further upstream.

== Natural history ==
Salmonidae and white-clawed crayfish have been identified in the waters of the Lam Brook. Every year a road in Charlcombe is closed for seven weeks in February and March to allow newts, frogs and toads to safely travel down the road to reach a lake in the Charlcombe valley on an unnamed tributary of the Lam Brook. Toad patrol volunteer Helen Hobbs received an award from the International Fund for Animal Welfare in 2010 for her work in saving around 4,500 amphibians.
