= Charlcombe =

Civil parish and village in Somerset, England

Coordinates: 51.405°N 2.357°W

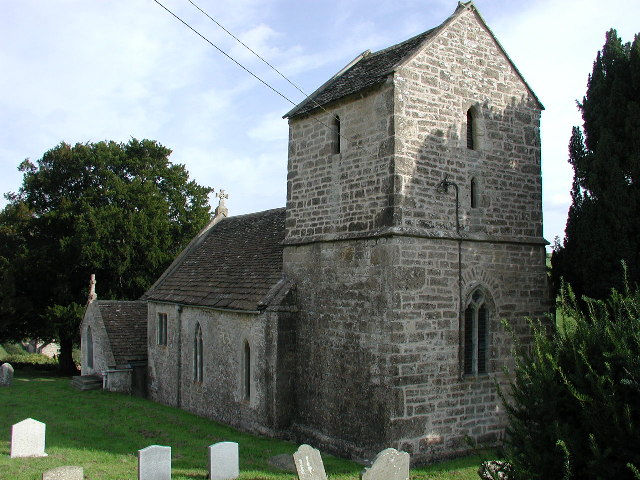
- St Mary Magdalene's Church at Langridge

- Location within Somerset
- Population: 422
- OS grid reference: ST752674
- Unitary authority: Bath and North East Somerset
- Ceremonial county: Somerset
- Region: South West
- Country: England
- Sovereign state: United Kingdom
- Post town: BATH
- Postcode district: BA1
- Police: Avon and Somerset
- Fire: Avon
- Ambulance: South Western
- UK Parliament: Bath

Charlcombe is a civil parish and village just north of Bath in the Bath and North East Somerset unitary authority area of Somerset, England. The parish had a population of 422 in 2011, and includes the villages of Woolley and Langridge and the hamlet of Lansdown (not to be confused with the Bath suburb of the same name).

== History ==
Charlcombe is mentioned in the Domesday Book of 1086 under the name "Cerlecume", meaning in Old English "valley of the ceorls" (freemen or peasants).

Langridge and Woolley were part of the hundred of Bath Forum, while the parish of Charlcombe was part of the hundred of Hampton.

The Battle of Lansdowne (1643) was fought in the Lansdown Hill area and is commemorated by Sir Bevil Grenville's Monument (1720).

From about 1720 until the early 19th century, Woolley was the site of a gunpowder mill.

In 1848 the village had a population of 84, and covered 523 acres (2.12 km^{2}).

Woolley is one of 52 thankful villages that lost no residents during World War I, and one of only 14 doubly thankful villages that also did not lose any residents in World War II. The village was featured on Darren Hayman's album, Thankful Villages Volume 2.

== Governance ==
The parish council has responsibility for local issues, including setting an annual precept (local rate) to cover the council’s operating costs and producing annual accounts for public scrutiny. The parish council evaluates local planning applications and works with the local police, district council officers, and neighbourhood watch groups on matters of crime, security, and traffic. The parish council's role also includes initiating projects for the maintenance and repair of parish facilities, such as the village hall or community centre, playing fields and playgrounds, as well as consulting with the district council on the maintenance, repair, and improvement of highways, drainage, footpaths, public transport, and street cleaning. Conservation matters (including trees and listed buildings) and environmental issues are also of interest to the council.

The parish falls within the unitary authority of Bath and North East Somerset which was created in 1996, as established by the Local Government Act 1992. It provides a single tier of local government with responsibility for almost all local government functions within its area including local planning and building control, local roads, council housing, environmental health, markets and fairs, refuse collection, recycling, cemeteries, crematoria, leisure services, parks, and tourism. It is also responsible for education, social services, libraries, main roads, public transport, Trading Standards, waste disposal and strategic planning, although fire, police and ambulance services are provided jointly with other authorities through the Avon Fire and Rescue Service, Avon and Somerset Constabulary and the Great Western Ambulance Service.

Bath and North East Somerset's area covers part of the ceremonial county of Somerset but it is administered independently of the non-metropolitan county. Its administrative headquarters is in Bath. Between 1 April 1974 and 1 April 1996, it was the Wansdyke district and the City of Bath of the county of Avon. Before 1974 that the parish was part of the Bathavon Rural District.

The parish is represented in the House of Commons of the Parliament of the United Kingdom as part of the Bath constituency. It elects one member of parliament (MP) by the first past the post system of election.

== Geography ==
=== Geology ===
The local geology of the Swainswick valley around Sopers Wood, in the south Cotswolds, has been investigated because of the presence of landslides since the work of William Smith in 1799. These are caused by the over-steepened topography downslope of the cap rock formed by the Great Oolite where water egresses around the plateau at the junction between the Great Oolite and the Fuller’s Earth formation and through the more permeable limestone bands within the Fuller’s Earth. Known locally as the Woolley Valley, there has been a dispute about development of green belt land.

=== Lansdown Hill ===
The plateau near the centre of the parish is known as Lansdown Hill and gives its name to the Bath suburb. The hamlet of Lansdown, about 3 miles (5 km) north-west of the centre of Bath, has a public house, the Charlcombe Inn; also here are Bath Racecourse and Lansdown Golf Course. The Battle of Lansdowne of the English Civil War took place on the hill in 1643.

== Wildlife ==
=== Frogs and toads ===
Every year in February and March, Charlcombe Lane is closed by the local council to enable frogs and toads to cross the road in safety. During this period local residents and volunteers go out at dusk, the time of greatest movement, collecting them in buckets and depositing them on the other side of the road, allowing them to continue their journey safely towards a lake in the Charlcombe valley on a tributary of the Lam Brook.

=== Other species ===
Surveys by Bath Natural History Society at Charlcombe Community Nature Reserve have recorded 124 plant species and 62 invertebrate species. The site is noted for the presence of large numbers of Red Bartsia (Odontites vernus), and invertebrates of note include Downland Bee-fly (Villa cingulata) and Hornet Hoverfly (Volucella zonaria).

== Religious sites ==
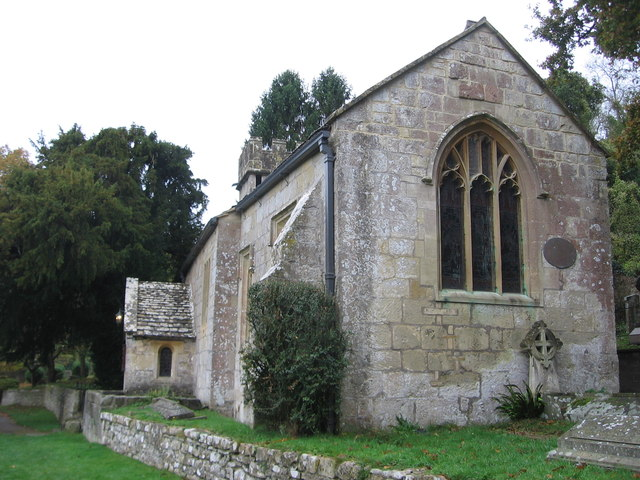
Church of St Mary, Charlcombe

The Church of St Mary is an ancient stone edifice, dating from the 12th century. It is a Grade II* listed building. There was believed to be a holy well in the grounds. According to tradition it was formerly the mother church of Bath, and received an annual acknowledgement of a pound of pepper from the abbey there.

All Saints' Church at Woolley dates from 1761 and is by John Wood, the Younger. It is Grade I listed.

In Langridge, the Church of St Mary Magdalene dates from the 12th century and has also been designated as a Grade I listed building.

== In literature ==
The village of Charlcombe is mentioned in letters by Jane Austen as being "sweetly situated in a little green valley, as a village with such a name ought to be".
