= John Wood, the Younger =

English architect, son of John Wood the elder

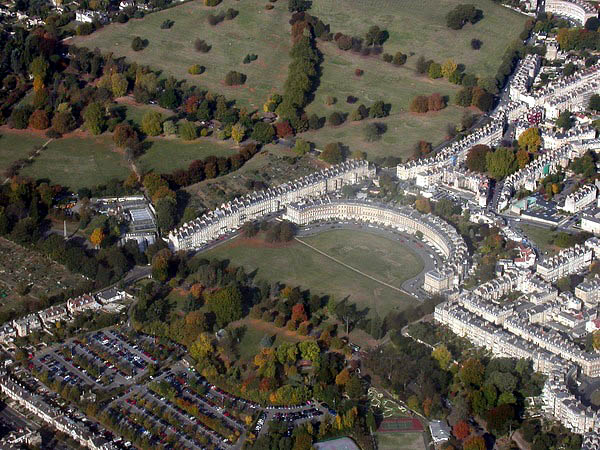
Aerial view of the Royal Crescent

John Wood, the Younger (25 February 1728 – 18 June 1782) was an English architect, working principally in the city of Bath, Somerset. He was the son of the architect John Wood, the Elder. His designs were highly influential during the 18th century and the Royal Crescent is considered to be one of the best examples of Georgian Neo-Classical architecture in Britain.

== Biography ==
John Wood was born in 1728, the year his father moved to Bath, and was baptised in Bath Abbey. He was trained by his father and as a young man worked on several of his father's projects such as Liverpool Town Hall. In either 1752 or early 1753 he married Elizabeth Brock. They had two sons together and at least eight daughters.

Wood died at Eagle House, Batheaston (his home in later years) on 16 June 1781 and was buried beside his father in the chancel at St Mary's Church, Swainswick. He was deeply in debt, partly due to financial conditions relating to his father's earlier building speculations.

== Works ==
Wood began his independent career by developing and extending his father's work in Bath. His first major project consisted of completing the Circus (his father died less than three months after the first stone was laid). His next achievement was the design and build of Gay Street to connect Queen Square and the Circus, his father's greatest triumphs.

Wood spent the next decades designing new buildings, terraces and architectural set-pieces for the city of Bath. It appears that he did not share his father's interest in druidism and freemasonry, but his designs show certain inspirations and themes which reflect 18th century fashions and philosophies.

During the 1770s a new more severe neo-classical style was becoming fashionable. Wood pioneered this new style in buildings such as the Hot Bath (built using the Doric order), the Royal Crescent and the Bath Assembly Rooms. These buildings contrasted with the more decorated and embellished style preferred by his father. Whilst John Wood the Elder's Circus includes superimposed orders and a detailed frieze, the Royal Crescent—designed by his son—has a single order and plain decoration throughout.

The site Wood chose for the Royal Crescent also shows that he was interested in creating a proto-romantic dialogue between his buildings and the surrounding countryside. Previous buildings and set-pieces in Bath were all intensely urban and inward looking whereas the Royal Crescent was fully open and looked out on to open fields. This is not always apparent today, but when it was built in 1775 the crescent was situated right on the edge of the city with no nearby buildings to block residents' views of the countryside. The Royal Crescent is among the greatest examples of Georgian architecture to be found in the United Kingdom and is a Grade I listed building.

Outside Bath, his most notable works include Buckland House in Buckland, Oxfordshire, and the General Infirmary in Salisbury. Knill's Monument in St Ives, Cornwall, constructed in 1782 for John Knill, was designed by Wood. In 1781, Wood published A Series of Plans for Cottages or Habitations of the Labourer, the earliest British pattern book for labourers' cottages.

== Reputation and assessment ==
John Wood the Younger is a key figure, not only in the history of Bath, but also in the history of British 18th-century architecture. When John Wood the Elder died, Queen Square and the Circus were isolated showpieces in Bath. His son connected these buildings and went on to create and inspire a new city quarter filled with elegant Palladian and neo-classical structures. Wood's clean, neo-classical style inspired other Georgian and Regency era architects in Bath such as John Pinch the elder, John Pinch the younger and Thomas Baldwin. The Royal Crescent is his greatest achievement and was one of the first designs of its type. It was imitated in Bath and also in later English towns such as Buxton, Brighton, Bristol and London.
