= Radio in Ethiopia =

Radio in Ethiopia was introduced during Emperor Haile Selassie regime in 1933 where the first radio station was built in 1931. On 31 January 1935, with assistance of the Italian contractor firm Ansaldo, the largest and more powerful station was built and the Emperor delivered the first speech in the broadcast.

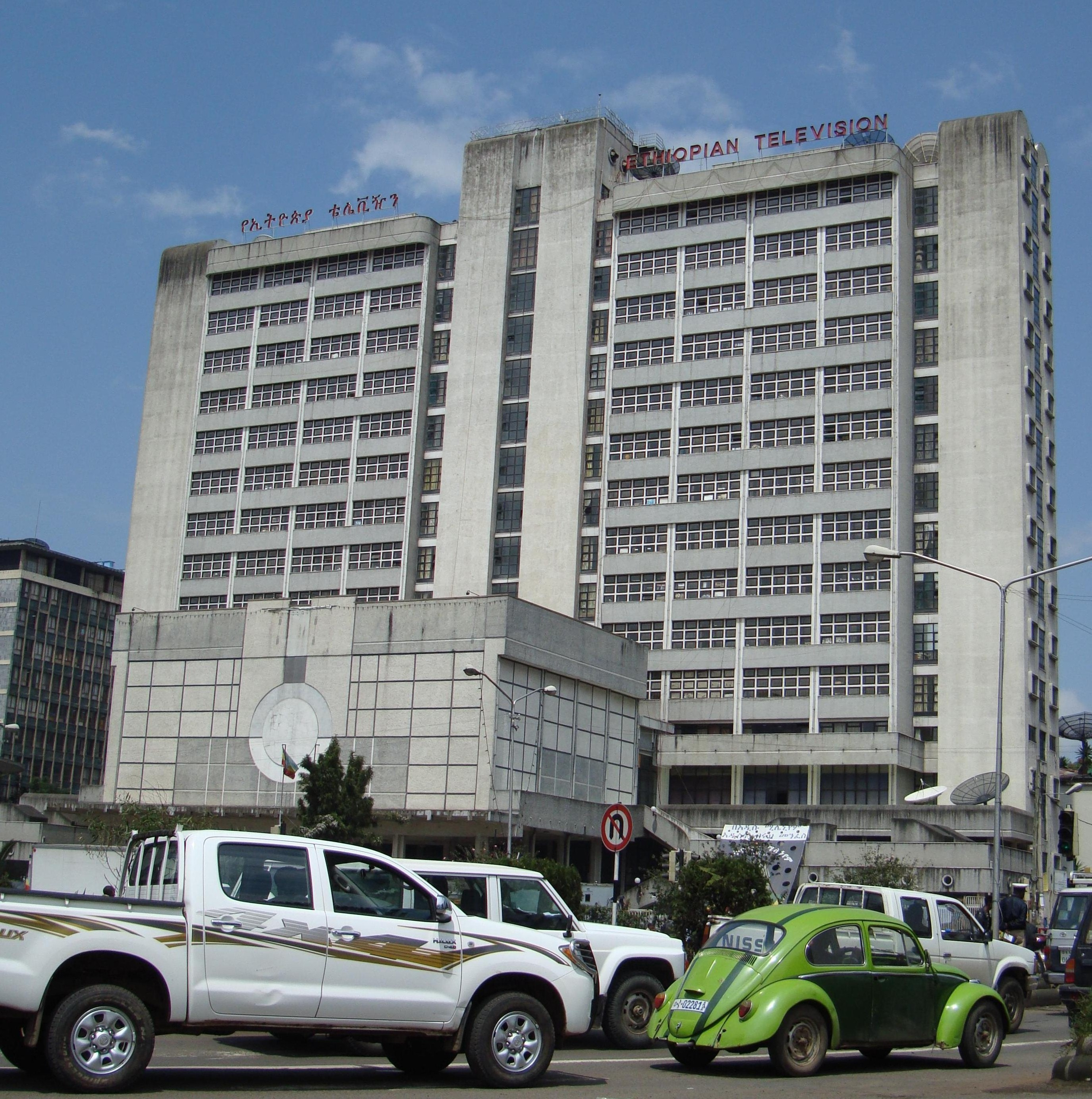
The Ethiopian Broadcasting Corporation headquarter in Addis Ababa

The modern radio transmission was installed by the U.S donation of 2.5 million dollars in 1957, to install ten-kilowatt short-wave transmitter at the Jimma Road and launched in 1960. The Radio Voice of Gospel began operating in 1964 specifically with Christian preaching in Addis Ababa, whereas the Radio Ethiopia was served as the main propaganda tool for the imperial government. By the 1970s, some circulars had been banned from reporting sensitive issues in accordance with the 1955 Constitution Promulgation.

Today, there are 3 main stations in Addis Ababa with 100 kilowatts, Harar with 100 watts and Asmara in 50 watts stations. They broadcast in Amharic, Afan Oromo, English, Afar, Arabic, Somali and French.

== History ==
Radio in Ethiopia began operating in 1933, under Emperor Haile Selassie, as the first radio stations built in two years prior in 1931. It was used for broadcast information to the masses, marking all-encompassing progress of the country. The foreign legations had earlier imported equipment for their own use. The Italian company Ansaldo granted a contract for the largest and more powerful station by which the Emperor was able to deliver his first message on 31 January 1935 for the first time.

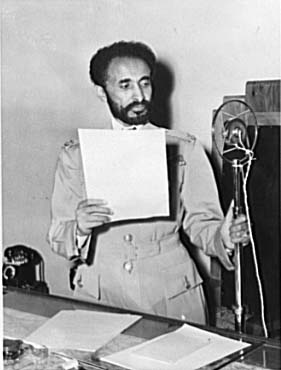
Emperor Haile Selassie delivering speech in a radio

During the Italian occupation of Ethiopia in 1936, the Ethiopian Patriots (Arbegnoch) demolished the radio telegraphic station, prompting the Italian to establish the new radio station at the center in Addis Ababa. On 7 September 1935, the first successful test had conducted over radio telephone in Akaki station, and broadcast Amharic-English language to denounce the Italian invasion. However, the radio station at Ras Kebede Sefer was not under operational service; the building was used as a residential training school for military radio operators in early 1935 and beginning of 1936.

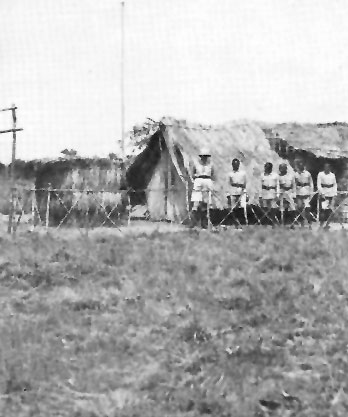
Belgian Field Radio Station in Italian East Africa (Ethiopia) during World War II

The Italian also destroyed the radio station after a war with British army during the Second World War East African Campaign in 1941. The British military force then embarked to repair the Broadcasting network in Ethiopia since 1942. The Ministry of Information employed a contract through Mackay Radio Telegram Company, the 7.5 KW transmitting station at Jimma Road left behind the Italians, was fixed with the radio telegraphic international broadcast to America and Far East were organized. Daily bulletin, music, and government announcement were broadcast.

The first radio station was Radio Ethiopia, depicted as a masterpiece for propaganda tool of the government of Ethiopia. Car radio was introduced by this time where they received messages from Haile Selassie, public announcement, news, plays, and proclamation. By 1950, recorded program transmission was commenced as recording materials available for assistance. Under Proclamation No.131/1952, the electrical means of transmission program was transferred to the Imperial Board of telecommunication. In 1953, there were short wave transmission in Ethiopia. The modern radio transmission began in 1957 when the United States donated 2.5 million dollars to install ten-kilowatt short-wave transmitter at the Jimma Road Station and launched in 1960. The Voice of the Gospel was granted to broadcast Christian radio station in Addis Ababa which officially opened in 1964. The station contributed to broadcast through different African languages.

The Lutheran World Federation was granted to establish a radio station and maintained the government interest to include private sectors in the field, and to broaden radio broadcasting service as an alternative. Another radio station was Kagnaw Station in Asmara, which was owned by the United States Army until 1978. This station served as a global network of communication. In 1966, three new high-power transmitters, i.e. 100 KW in Geja Hara, near Addis Ababa, 50 KW in Adi Ugri, near Asmara and 100 KW in Harar medium wave transmission were installed. In 1968, the Ethiopian Broadcast Authority became an autonomous body under Ministry of Information. Under the 1955 Constitution, all mass media shall be under government control; circulars were prohibited to report sensitive issues at the beginning of the 1970s.

As of December 2020, Ethiopia has 50 community radio stations that have broadcast license to the Ethiopian Broadcast Authority with four types of licensing and broadcasting.

== List of radio stations ==
There are three main stations: 100-kilowatt station in Addis Ababa, a 100-kilowatt station in Harar and a 50-kilowatt station outside in Asmara, with additional programs being broadcast from 1 10-kilowatt station in Addis Ababa. Main languages are Amharic, Afan Oromo, English, Afar, Arabic, Somali and French.

=== Medium wave and short wave broadcasting ===
MW and SW are utilized for reaching wider audiences, especially in rural areas. Ethiopia has the following MW stations.

Station	Frequency(kHz)	Transmitter location
Amhara Radio	801	Bahir Dar
Ethiopian Radio	873	Geja Dera
Oromo Broadcasting Network	1035	Adama
Radio Fana	1080	
Voice of America	1431	Djibouti

The following short wave stations broadcast from Ethiopia.

Station	Frequency(kHz)	Transmitter location
Dimtsi Woyane	5950	Geja Jawe
Oromo Broadcasting Network	6030	Geja Jawe
Amhara Radio	6090	Geja Jawe
Radio Fana		
Ethiopian Radio	7236	Geja Jawe

=== FM stations ===
FM radio in Ethiopia had its inception with FM Addis 97.1 in 2000, broadcasting on the frequency 97.1MHz. Since then, the radio landscape in Ethiopia has flourished, with numerous FM radio stations emerging, particularly centered around the capital city of Addis Ababa. The stations used to follow odd frequencies to avoid interference. The following list includes stations around Addis Ababa mainly transmitting from mount Furi.

Station	Frequency(MHz)	Transmitter location
Awash FM	90.7	Mount Furi
Feteh Radio	91.1	Mount Furi
Oromo Broadcasting Network	92.3	Mount Entoto
Ethiopian Radio Relay	93.1	Mount Furi
Ahadu FM	94.3	Mount Furi
Education Radio	94.7	
Arada FM	95.1	Mount Furi
Addis Media Network	96.3	Addis Ababa City Hall
EBC FM Addis	97.1	Mount Furi
Tirta FM	97.6	Mount Furi
Fana FM	98.1	Mount Furi
Menaheria FM	99.1	Mount Furi
Addis Ababa University Community Media	99.4	Addis Ababa University
Bisrat FM	101.1	Mount Furi
Sheger FM	102.1	Mount Furi
Abay FM	102.9	Mount Furi
EBC Radio	104.7	Mount Furi
Afro FM	105.3	Mount Furi
Ethio FM	107.8	Mount Furi
