= Charles Edward Davis =

Charles Edward Davis (29 August 1827 – 10 May 1902) was an English architect and antiquary.

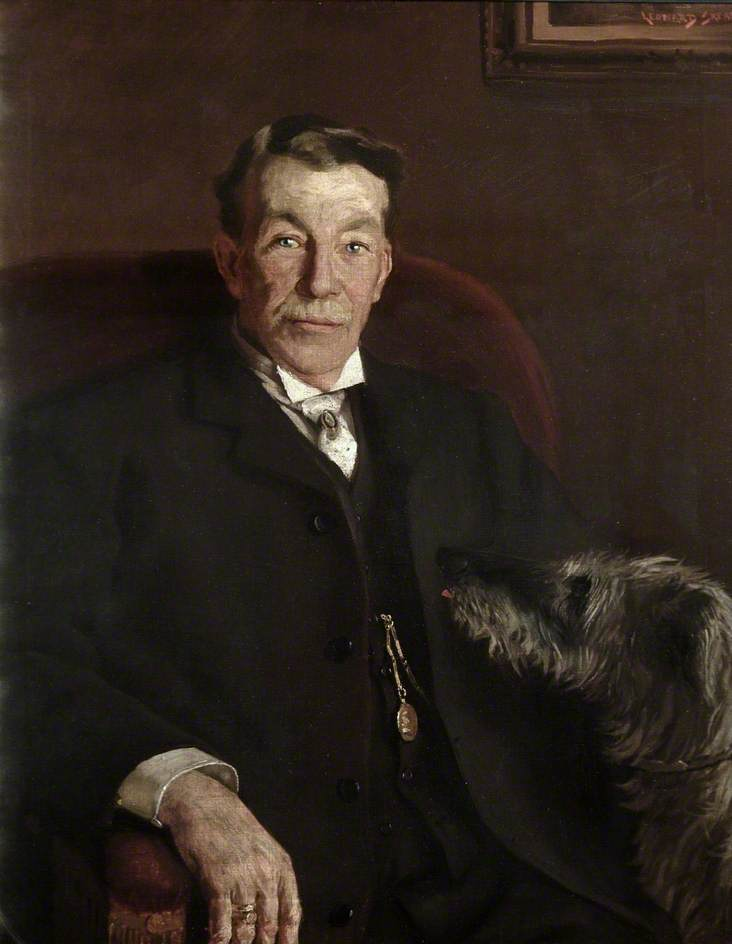
Charles Edward Davis

== Life ==
Born near Bath, Somerset, in 1827, he was son of Edward Davis, an architect there and pupil of Sir John Soane, and his wife Dorothy Walker, widow of Captain Johnston of the Madras cavalry. He began as his father's pupil, and in 1863, having recently won a competition for the cemetery buildings on the lower Bristol Road, was appointed city architect and surveyor to the corporation of Bath. He held these posts for forty years.

To collect information on the nature and management of spas, Davis in 1885 made a tour of major European watering places. He applied his knowledge to improvements at Bath, and was consulted by English corporations with natural baths, including Harrogate and Droitwich. Difficulties with the corporation regarding his official duties led in 1900 to the transfer to another person of the supervision of the corporate property; the baths and the provision markets were left in Davis's charge.

Davis was elected a fellow of the Society of Antiquaries of London in 1850. He died at his residence, Bathwick Hill in 1902. The rank of major by which Davis was generally addressed arose from his commission in the Worcestershire militia; he was also a member of the Bath volunteer rifles.

== Works ==
Davis worked on redevelopment of the Roman Baths. Exploring in 1869 the site of the hot springs of the old King's Bath, he found remains of Roman thermal work and published a descriptive account. In 1877–88 he exposed the Roman well beneath the King's bath, a discovery that had been foreshadowed; Alexander Sutherland, M.D. (An attempt to ascertain and extend the virtues of Bath and Bristol waters 2nd edit. 1764) had followed the researches made by Charles Lucas in 1755. In 1880-81 Davis found the Great Bath and in 1884–86 the Circular Bath, both Roman.

The old Queen's Bath, constructed in 1597 and named after Anne of Denmark, was removed in the course of the Roman discoveries of 1885. Davis's main original design was the new Queen's Bath, begun in 1886, and completed in 1889. The work and incidental restoration met with criticism on structural as well as archaeological grounds. Reports were made on behalf of the Society of Antiquaries by John Henry Middleton and William Henry St John Hope, but local debate grew heated; an independent opinion sought from Alfred Waterhouse, who in a report dated 14 January 1887 came to anodyne conclusions.

Besides his work for the corporation Davis had a private practice. He designed and restored churches, including St Peter's in Freshford and St Mary Magdalene's Church in Langridge, Charlcombe. He was the architect of the Empire Hotel, Bath, opened in 1901, and the Colonnades, balustrading, steps and kiosk at Parade Gardens opposite the hotel.

Davis published Mineral Baths of Bath; the Bath of Bathes Ayde in the Reign of Charles II (Bath, 1883), and other several pamphlets on the same subject. In 1863, he designed an escritoire, Bath's wedding gift to Alexandra of Denmark, presented in 1869; it incorporated Royal Worcester designed by Arthur Murch.

== Family ==
Davis married in 1858 Selina Anne, eldest daughter of Captain Howarth, who survived him without issue.

== Notes ==
Attribution

This article incorporates text from a publication now in the public domain: Lee, Sidney, ed. (1912). "Davis, Charles Edward". Dictionary of National Biography (2nd supplement). Vol. 1. London: Smith, Elder & Co.
