= Radio Voice of Revolutionary Ethiopia =

Radio Voice of Revolutionary Ethiopia was the former Radio Voice of the Gospel in Addis Abeba.

The station was nationalized by the Revolutionary Military Government during March 1977. The infrastructure of the station at the time of confiscation consisted of two strong 200 kW transmitters with directional antennas, one medium wave transmitter and studios in Addis Ababa.
