= Orange Grove, Bath =

Park and street in Bath, Somerset

Orange Grove
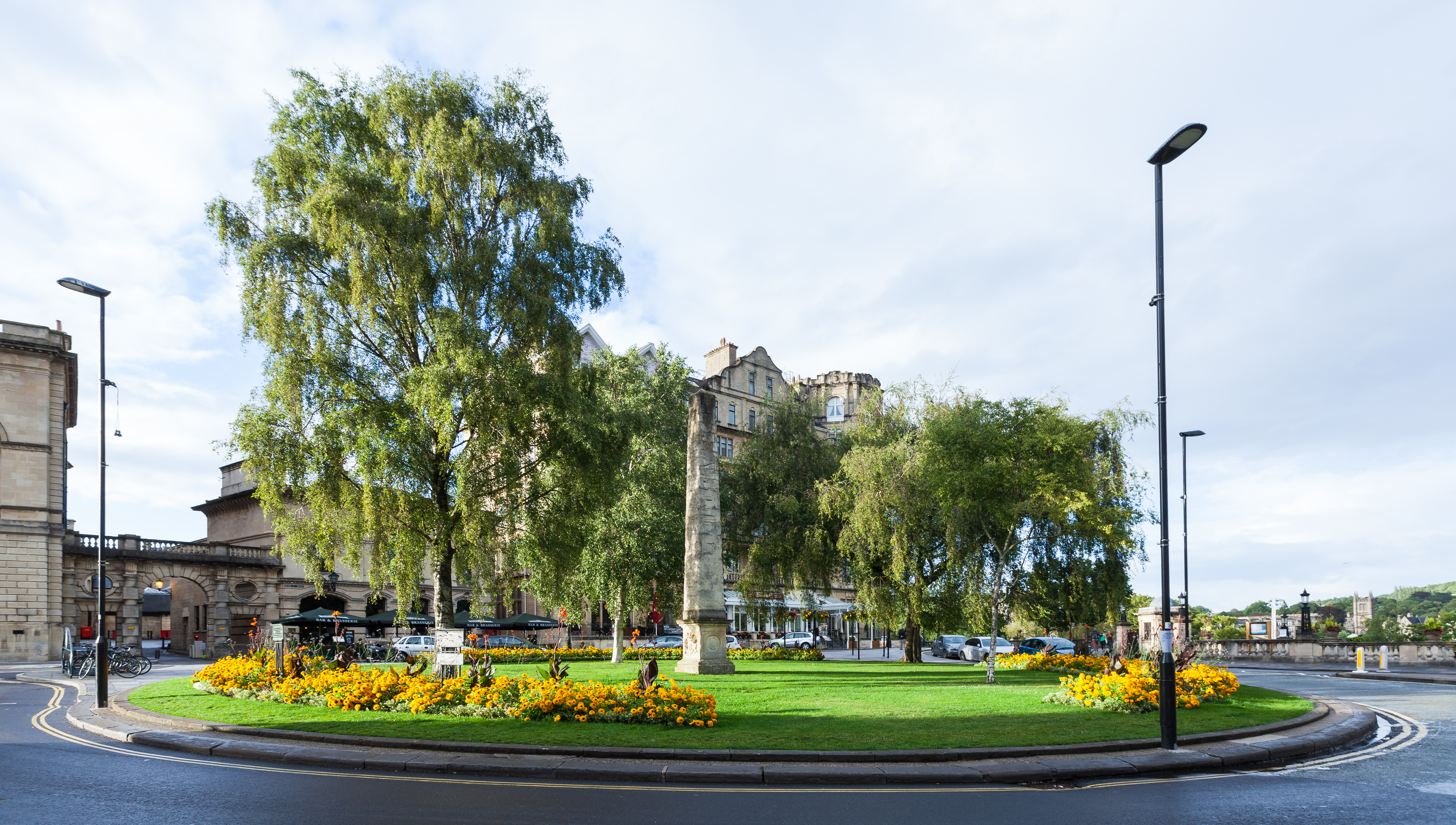
- Orange Grove in 2014, looking north
- Interactive map of Orange Grove
- Type: Garden
- Location: Bath, Somerset, England
- Coordinates: 51.38182°N 2.35802°W

Orange Grove is a park in Bath, Somerset, England. Situated on a roundabout, the park occupies the former churchyard of Bath Priory. Orange Grove became a public space on 1572 and was landscaped around 200 years later. Today, it is home to Alkmaar Garden, which was established after World War II to honour the link between the cities of Bath and Alkmaar in the Netherlands.

In the centre of the park is an obelisk commemorating the Prince of Orange's visit to Bath in 1734. It was erected by Beau Nash.

Orange Grove is also the name of the street bounding the park immediately to the north, on which stands the Old Police Station and the Empire Hotel.
