= North Parade, Bath =

Street in Bath and North East Somerset, United Kingdom

North Parade
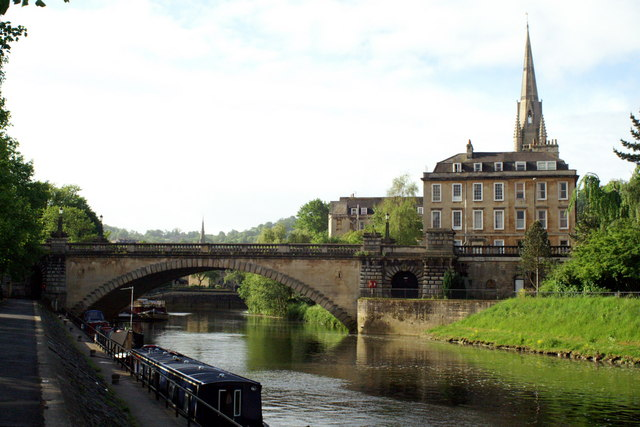
- North Parade bridge, showing Number 14 and the spire of St John's church.

- Location within Somerset
- 51°22′51″N 2°21′24″W
- Location: Bath, Somerset, England

History
- Built: 1741

Site notes
- Architect: John Wood, the Elder
- Architectural style: Georgian

Listed Building – Grade I
- Official name: No 14 and Delia's Grotto
- Designated: 12 June 1950
- Reference no.: 1395795; 1395797

Listed Building – Grade I
- Official name: Numbers 7 to 12 and North Parade House (No 12A)
- Designated: 12 June 1950
- Reference no.: 1395790; 1395794

Listed Building – Grade II*
- Official name: Numbers 2 to 6
- Designated: 12 June 1950
- Reference no.: 1395777; 1395779; 1395782; 1395783; 1395787

Listed Building – Grade II
- Official name: Nos 1 & 1A
- Designated: 12 June 1950
- Reference no.: 1395750; 1395775

Listed Building – Grade II
- Official name: North Parade Bridge
- Designated: 5 August 1975
- Reference no.: 1395800

North Parade in Bath, Somerset, England is a historic terrace built around 1741 by John Wood, the Elder. Several of the houses have been designated as Grade I listed buildings.

North Parade was part of a wider scheme to build a Royal Forum, including South Parade, Pierrepont and Duke Streets, similar to Queen Square, which was never completed. Wood designed the facade, of Bath stone, after which a variety of builders completed the work with different interiors and rear elevations. Many of the buildings are now hotels and shops whilst some remain as private residences.

The three-storey house at Number 1 was the home of John Palmer, who owned the Theatre Royal, Bath and instigator of the British system of mail coaches that was the beginning of the great British post office reforms with the introduction of an efficient mail coach delivery service in Great Britain during the late 18th century. He was Mayor of Bath on two occasions and Comptroller General of the Post Office, and later served as Member of Parliament for the constituency of Bath between 1801 and 1807.

Numbers 2 to 6 were converted into a hotel, which included some alterations to the fabric of the building.

Numbers 7 to 12 include a central projection and pediments over the doors. Number 9 is connected with Wordsworth and number 11 was home to Edmund Burke and Oliver Goldsmith, of the literary Club, in 1771.

The final house, number 14, is faces the River Avon and adjoins the last house in Duke Street. It was known as Sheridan House, and later as the Gay Hotel. In the garden below the house is a little grotto dedicated to Delia.

North Parade Bridge was built almost 100 years later in 1836 by William Tierney Clark. His original bridge was made of cast iron on stone abutments, with lodges and staircases. This was rebuilt in 1936, being refaced in stone over a new reinforced concrete superstructure which replaced the two outside ribs of the original eight cast-iron arches.

The entrance to the council-run Sports and Leisure Centre on the Recreation Ground is to the east of the bridge. Further east on North Parade Road is the Bath Cricket Club Ground, and the Bath Law Courts which holds the Bath Magistrates' Court and the Bath County Court and Family Court.

== Gallery ==
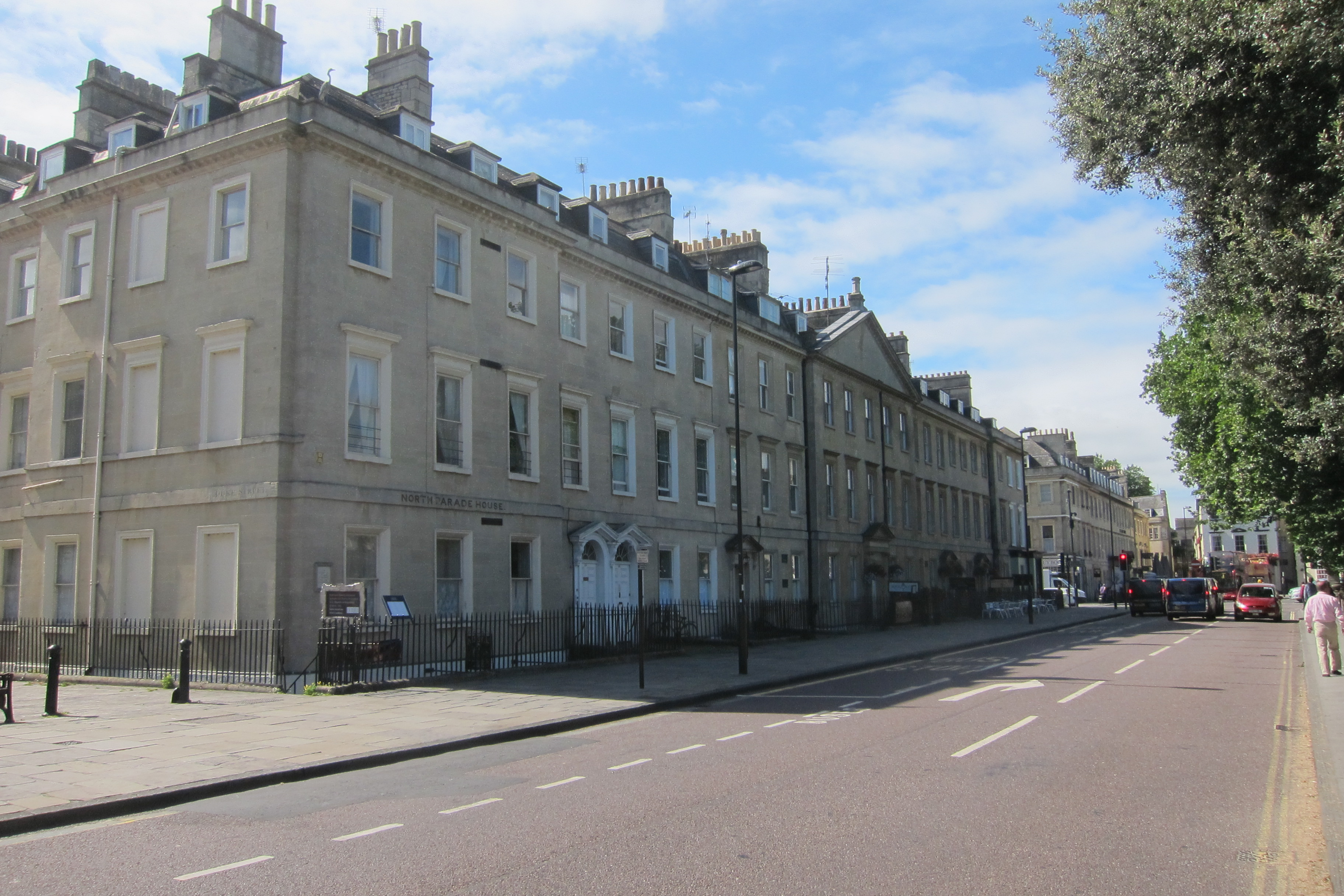
7-12 North Parade

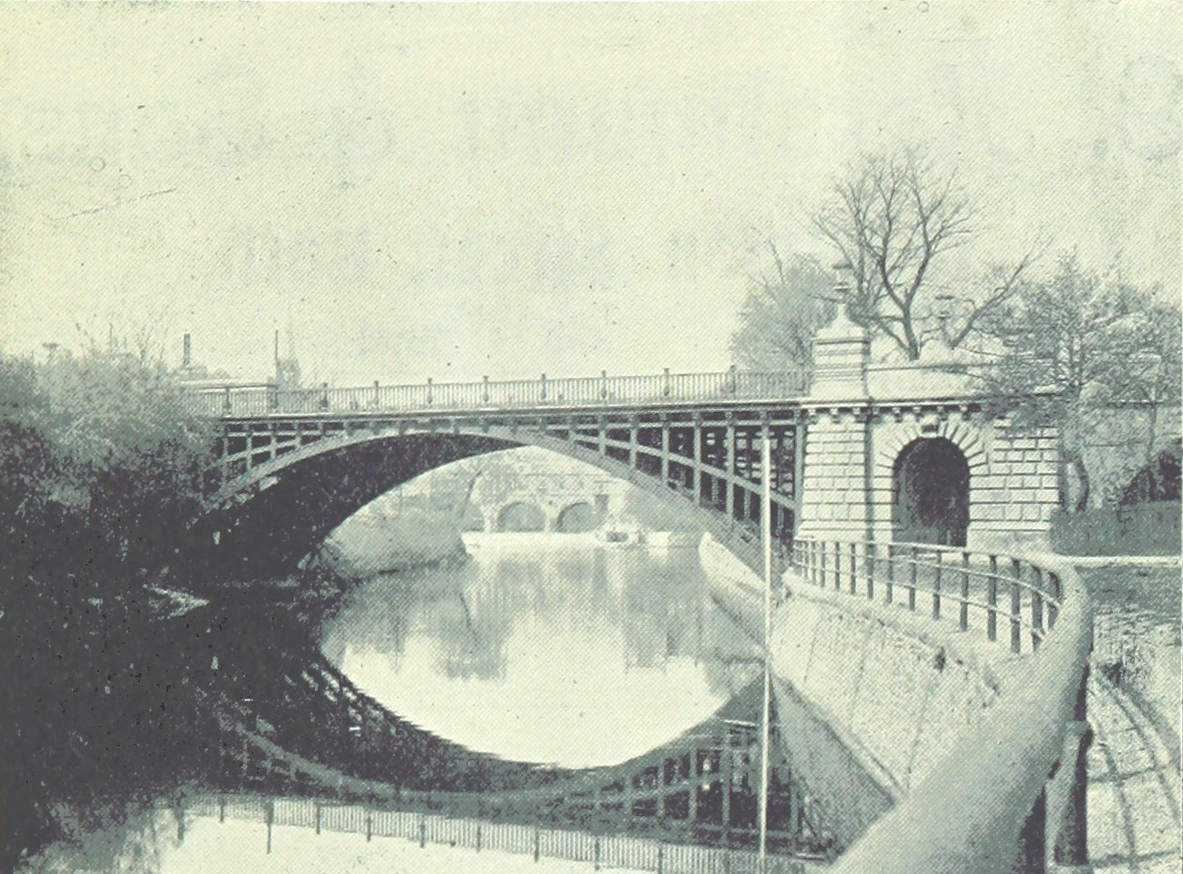
North Parade Bridge before the 1936 rebuild, showing cast-iron arches

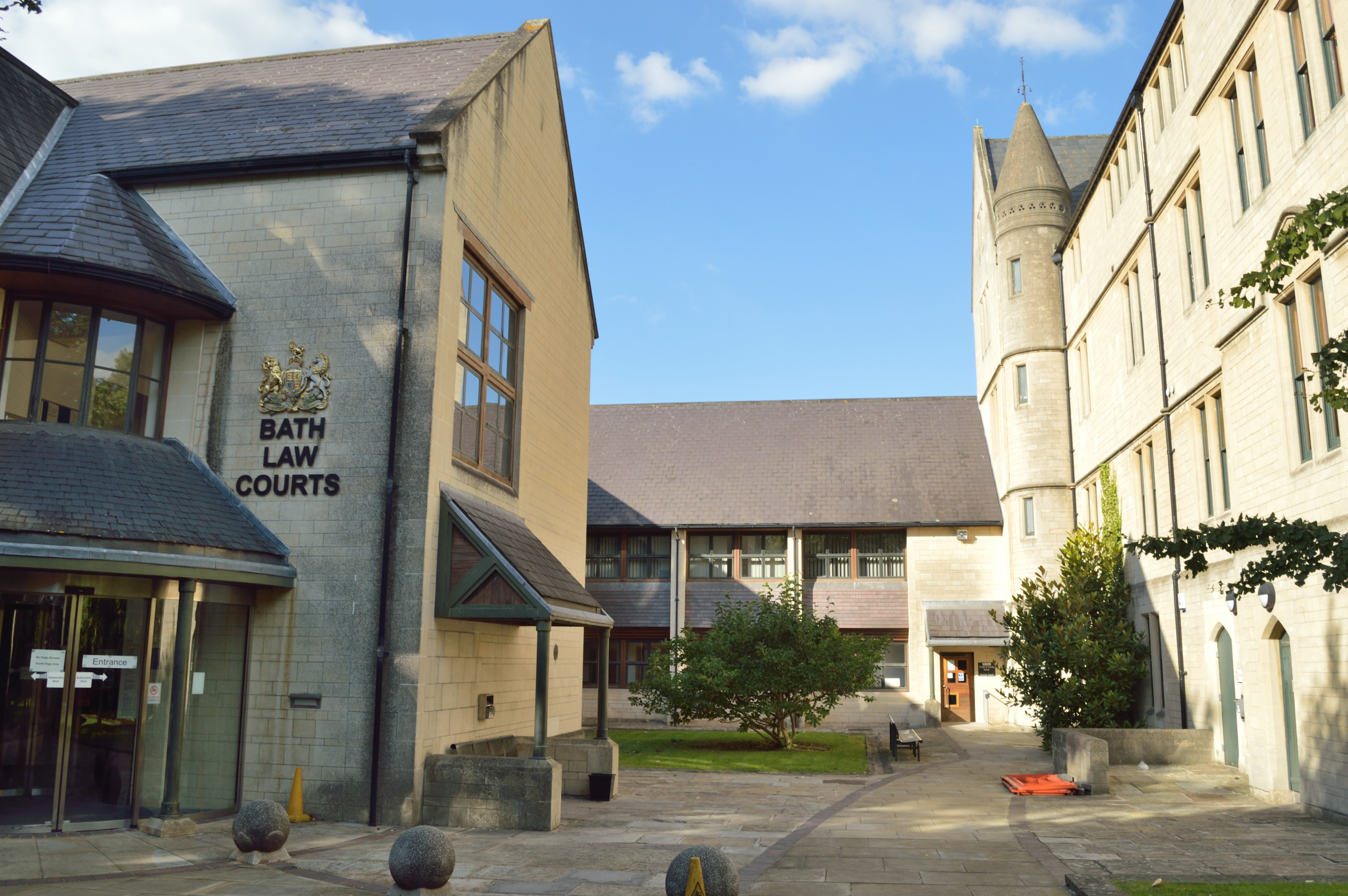
Bath Law Courts

== See also ==
- List of Grade I listed buildings in Bath and North East Somerset
- Bog Island, located at the western end of North Parade
