= Mausoleum of Menelik II =

Imperial mausoleum in Addis Ababa, Ethiopia

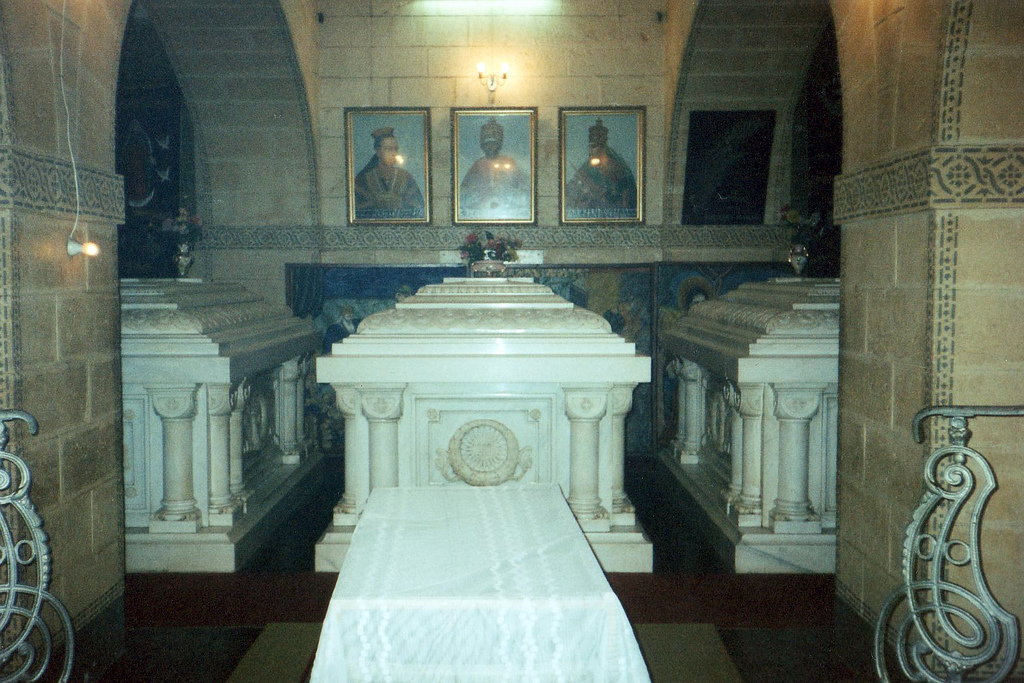
- Interactive map of Mausoleum of Menelik II

Details
- Established: 1913
- Location: Kidist Maryam Church, Sidist Kilo, Addis Ababa, Ethiopia
- Coordinates: 9.063699995127106°N 38.75758332611499°E
- Type: Imperial mausoleum

Mausoleum of Menelik II is an Imperial mausoleum built in 1913 to house the tomb of Ethiopian Emperor Menelik II.

It is an active church and also the final tomb of Menelik's wife Empress Taitu and his successor Empress Zewditu. The mausoleum is found in within the church of Kidist Maryam next to the Kidane Mihret Church in Sidist Kilo Square.

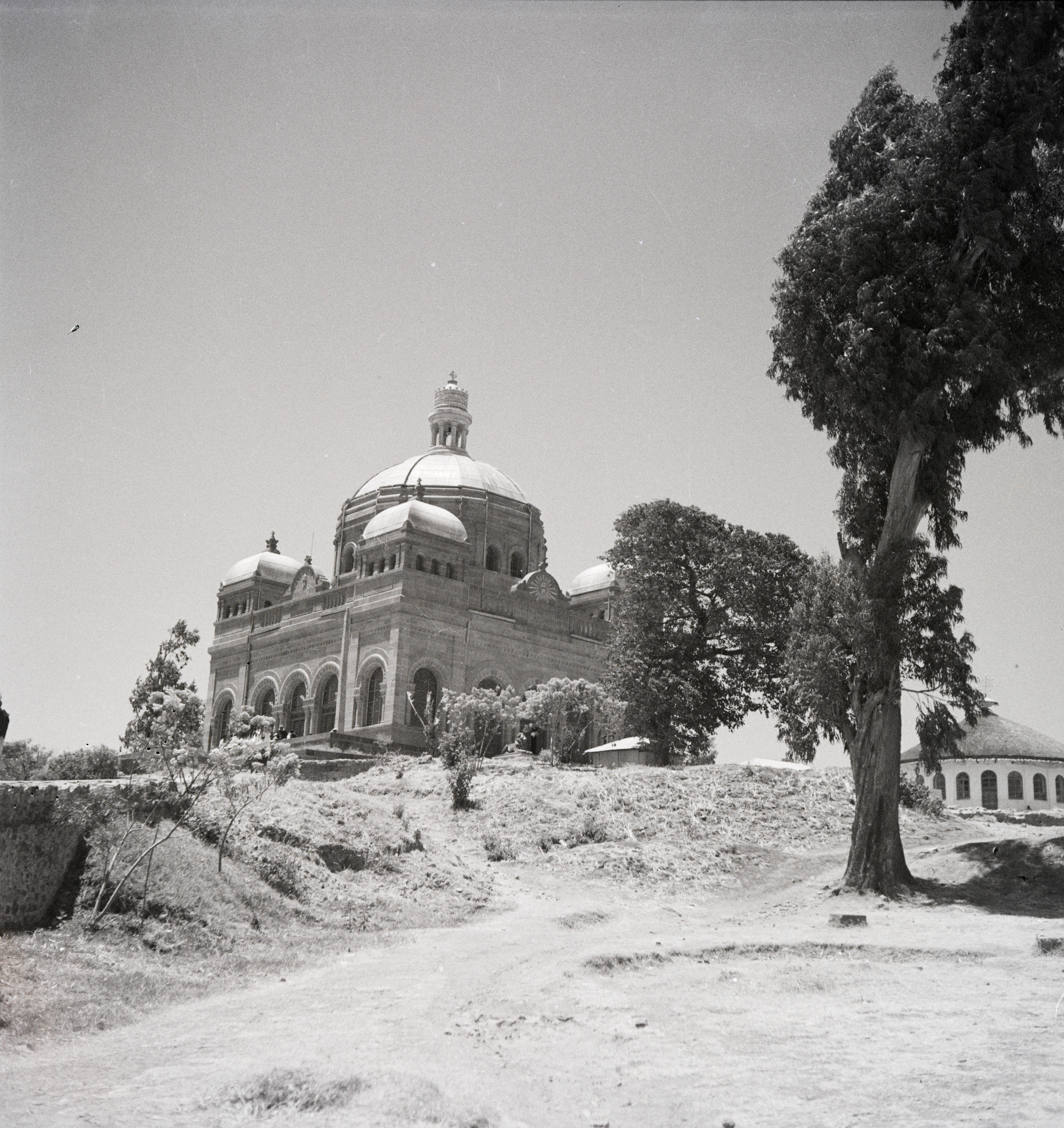
The mausoleum in 1934

In 1928, the mausoleum was a site of a coup attempt against Ras Tafari by supporters of Zewditu, resulted in Tafari's victory.
