= Fairfield House, Bath =

Villa in Bath, England

Coordinates: 51.3902°N 2.3998°W

Fairfield House
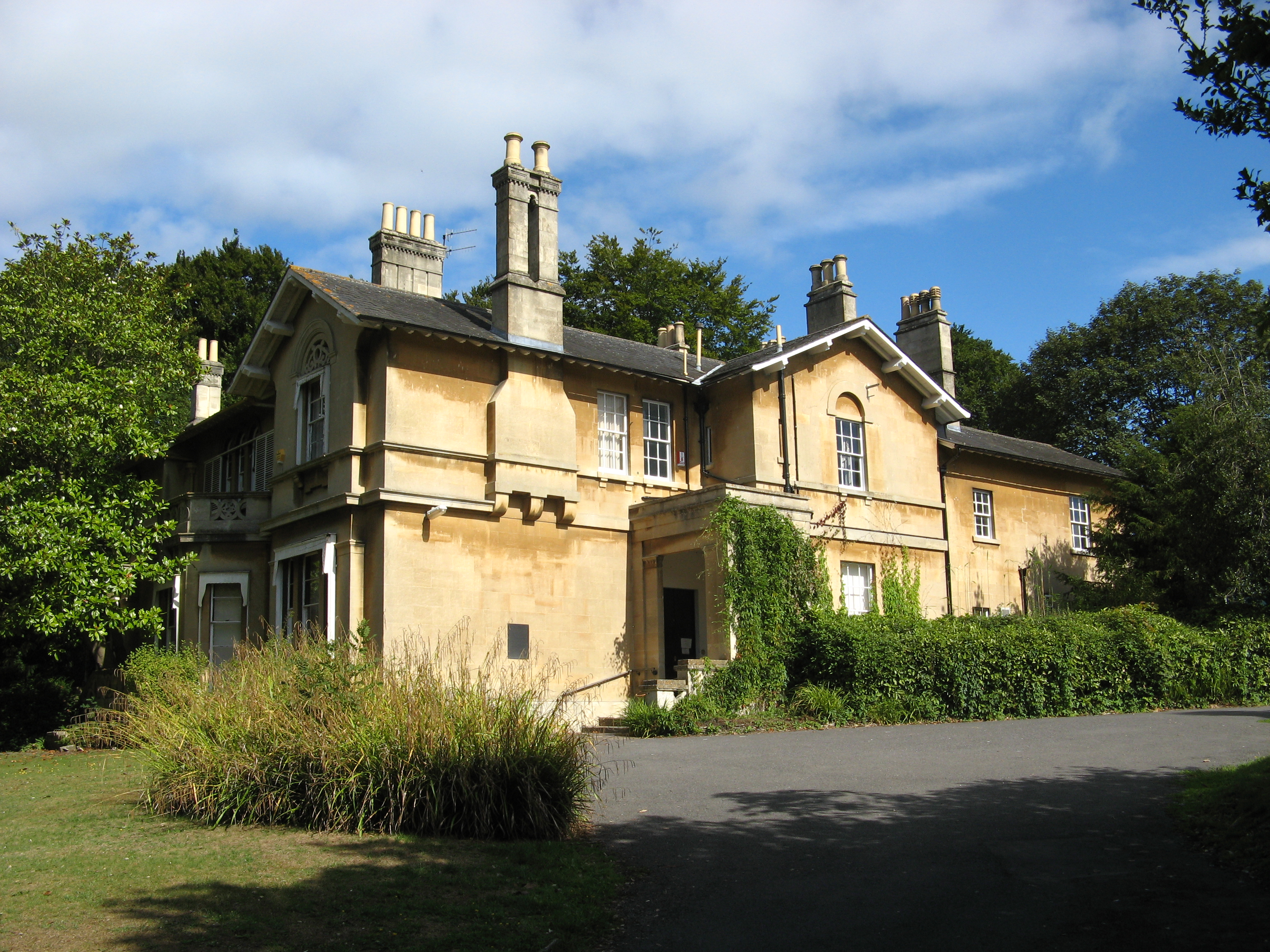
- Interactive map of the Fairfield House area

General information
- Type: Two storey ashlar villa
- Architectural style: Italianate
- Location: Bath, England
- Construction started: c1840
- Completed: c1850

Design and construction
- Architect: James Wilson

Fairfield House, in Newbridge, Bath, England is a Grade II listed building. It was the residence of Haile Selassie I, Emperor of Ethiopia, during the five years he spent in England (1936–41). Following his return to Ethiopia, he donated it to the city of Bath in 1958 as a residence for the aged.

The Italianate two-storey house was built around 1850, probably by James Wilson, on Kelston Road in the northwest outskirts of the city.

The house has significance to the UK Rastafari movement because it was bought in 1936 by Haile Selassie I after the death of the previous owner Mrs Campbell-White, following a short stay at the Bath Spa Hotel, while the house was renovated. He lived in the house with his family and staff for five years. The renovation provided a large double drawing room with two fireplaces, and a dining room with pantry.

The rooms for Haile Selassie to meet contacts and supporters included a 'telephone room' or small office and the morning room. There were five principal bedrooms with rooms in the attic for servants. There are numerous accounts of "Haile Selassie I was my next door neighbour" amongst people who were children in the Bath area during his residence.

In 1943 it was used as a home for babies evacuated from Chippenham. Haile Selassie gave the house to the City of Bath in 1958 during the visit when he was given the Freedom of the City.

Fairfield House was used as a care home until 1993, when new room size requirements made it unsuitable for such use. Since then it has been used as a day centre by a number of groups including the Bath Ethnic Minority Senior Citizens' Association, Age Concern, the Ethiopian Coptic Church and a Rastafari church.

In 2014 a community group, Friends of Fairfield House, were negotiating a community asset transfer in order to preserve and develop the house.

In 2019 a community interest company was established to support the running of the house as a community asset.
