= St Stephen's Church, Bath =

Church in Somerset, England

Coordinates: 51.39285°N 2.36358°W

St Stephen's Church
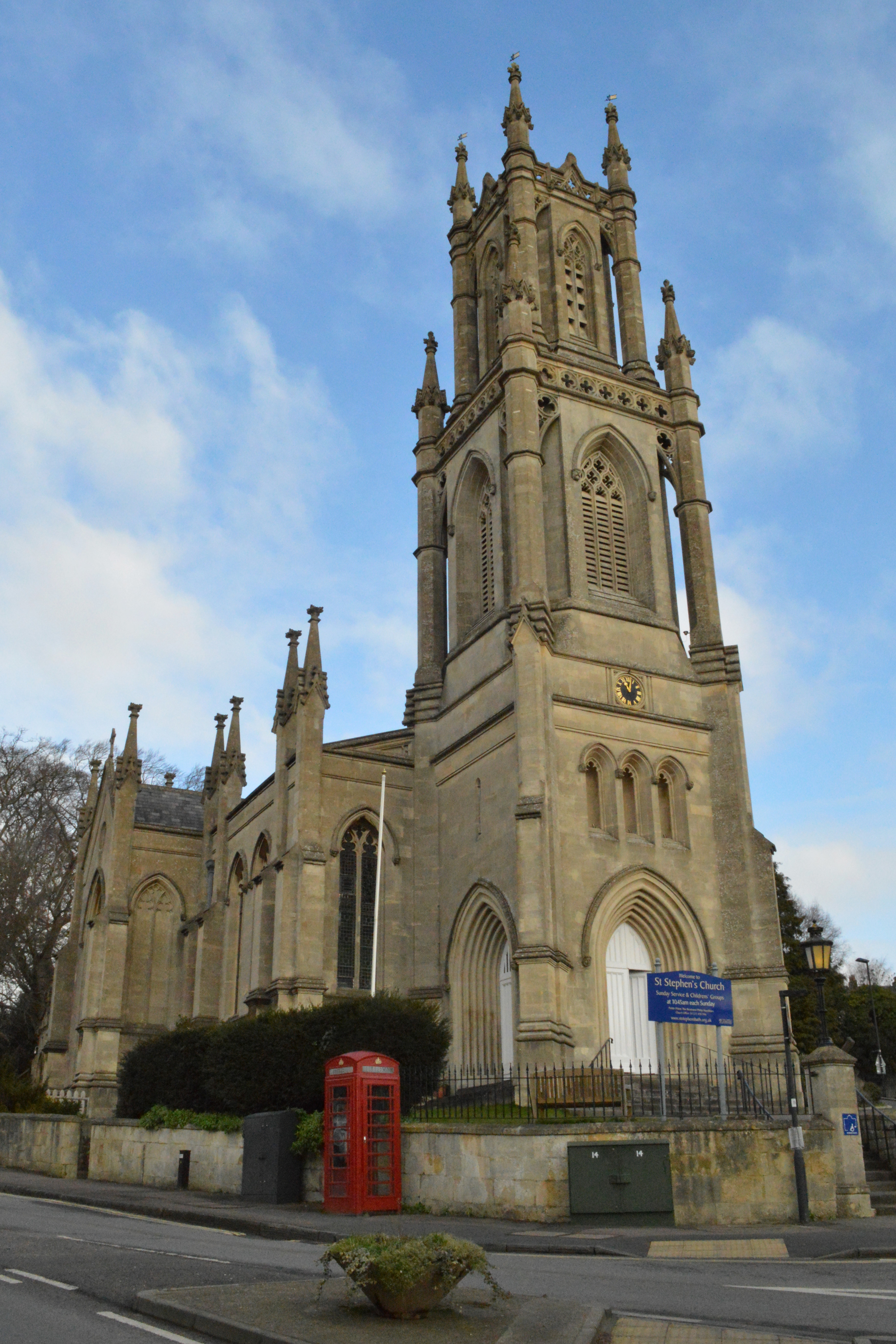
- Interactive map of the St Stephen's Church area

General information
- Architectural style: Victorian architecture
- Location: Bath, England
- Construction started: 1840
- Completed: 1845, 1883, 1866
- Cost: 6,000 pounds
- Client: Anglican Church

Technical details
- Structural system: Bath Stone Masonry

Design and construction
- Architect: James Wilson

St Stephen's Church is a Church of England parish church in Bath, Somerset, England.

== History ==
Designed to serve the spiritual needs of northeast Bath by James Wilson and built between 1840 and 1845, from Bath Stone, a limestone sourced from the Limpley Stoke mine which is situated in the Limpley Stoke Valley.

St Stephen's Church on Lansdown Road in Walcot cost £6,000. The constructed church, however, remained unconsecrated until 1881. For the Royal School, a northeast aisle was added in 1866, thought to be designed by the Wilson & Willcox firm.

The very wide apsidal chancel with the vestry and organ chamber was built by W. J. Willcox in 1882–1883, for £3,000. W. J. Willcox also designed the painted ceiling in 1886, which was executed by H. & F. Davis.

The Lady Chapel's east stained glass window was completed in 1983 by local artist Mark Angus to commemorate one hundred years since the formation of the parish. 'Centenary' depicts St Stephen's transformation on the bridge between life and death to the moment of martyrdom: 'With distorted ambiguity between pain and repose, the body rises amid red flames on a blue ground'. The Gothicised font and font cover are marble and dated 1843. The c.1900 transept ceiling and reredos are by Sir T. G. Jackson.

The crypt was converted into a community centre in 1993-1994 by Slade, Smith and Winrow. In 2007 the tower stonework was restored and the church bells replaced. Modern exterior floodlighting, replacing a less efficient previous system, was installed.

== Present day ==
The parish is a member of Inclusive Church, an organisation founded in 2003 that advocates for the full inclusion of all people regardless of ethnicity, gender and sexual orientation.
