= Swainswick =

Village in Somerset, England

Coordinates: 51.4122°N 2.3514°W

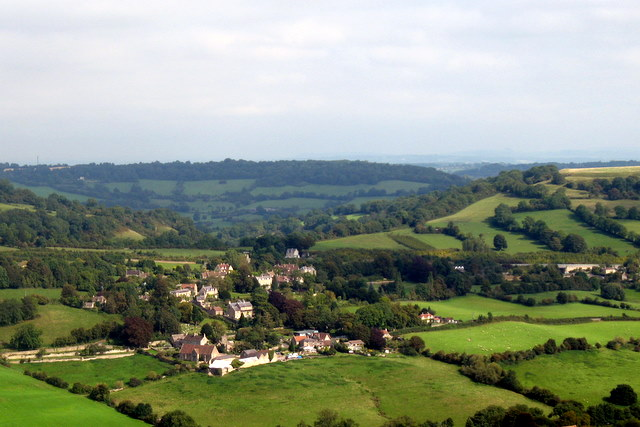
- Upper Swainswick

- Location within Somerset
- Population: 265
- OS grid reference: ST756681
- Unitary authority: Bath and North East Somerset
- Ceremonial county: Somerset
- Region: South West
- Country: England
- Sovereign state: United Kingdom
- Post town: BATH
- Postcode district: BA1
- Dialling code: 01225
- Police: Avon and Somerset
- Fire: Avon
- Ambulance: South Western
- UK Parliament: Bath

Swainswick is a small village and civil parish, 3 miles (4.8 km) northeast of Bath, on the A46 in the Bath and North East Somerset unitary authority, Somerset, England. The parish has a population of 265. The village name was also spelled Sweyneswik and Sweyneswick in the early 13th to 14th Century.

== History ==
Bladud or Blaiddyd was a mythical king of the Britons, for whose existence there is little historical evidence, but legend holds that he returned to Britain from Athens with leprosy and was imprisoned as a result, but escaped and went into hiding. He found employment as a swineherd at Swainswick and noticed that his pigs would go into an alder-moor in cold weather and return covered in black mud. He found that the mud was warm and that they did it to enjoy the heat. He also noticed that the pigs which did this did not suffer from skin diseases as others did. On trying the mud bath himself, he found that he was cured of his leprosy.

Another version of the story says that his pigs became infected and diseased and that his search for food for the pigs brought him to Swainswick, where a farmer advised him to look for acorns on the far side of the river (possibly the Lam Brook at the bottom of the Lam valley). He came to a place where the pigs began to wallow in hot mud. To entice them out, he climbed an oak tree, collected some acorns and made a trail out of the mud. As the pigs came out, he scraped them clean and found their skin was cleansed and cured.

Bladud jumped in and bathed himself in the mud. He emerged to find his skin clear and his disease healed. Bladud returned to the tribe where he later became King. Later, he sent his servants to Bath to establish a settlement, building a temple by the hot springs around which the City grew.

It is possible that the name of Swainswick is derived from Sweyn Forkbeard (c. 960 – 3 February 1014), who along with his troops is said to have stayed in Bath in 1013 whilst conducting a full-scale invasion of Briton before becoming King, according to the contemporary Peterborough version of the Anglo-Saxon Chronicle (also called the Laud Manuscript). The chronicles tell that "Then went King Sweyne thence to Wallingford; and so over Thames westward to Bath, where he abode with his army. Thither came Alderman Ethelmar, and all the western thanes with him, and all submitted to Sweyne, and gave hostages. When he had thus settled all, then went he northward to his ships; and all the population fully received him, and considered him full king."

The Domesday Book of 1086 records that Swainswick (Swayneswycke) was held by Nigel de Gournay, who would have won his lands in Englishcombe, Twerton, Swainswick and Barrow Gurney by fighting for William I of England. His original home was probably Gournay, which was half-way between Dieppe and Paris. Thomas de Gournay was involved with the murder of Edward II at Berkeley Castle in 1327.

Swainswick was part of the hundred of Bath Forum.

The 3 miles (5 km) £45 million A46 dual-carriageway Batheaston/Swainswick bypass opened in summer 1996.

== Governance ==
The parish council has responsibility for local issues, including setting an annual precept (local rate) to cover the council's operating costs and producing annual accounts for public scrutiny. The parish council evaluates local planning applications and works with the local police, district council officers and neighbourhood watch groups on matters of crime, security, and traffic. The parish council's role also includes initiating projects for the maintenance and repair of parish facilities, such as the village hall or community centre, playing fields and playgrounds, as well as consulting with the district council on the maintenance, repair, and improvement of highways, drainage, footpaths, public transport and street cleaning. Conservation matters (including trees and listed buildings) and environmental issues are also of interest to the council.

The parish is split between the Bathavon North (Upper Swainswick) and Lambridge (Lower Swainswick) wards of the unitary authority of Bath and North East Somerset Council which was created in 1996 (as per the Local Government Act 1992).. It provides a single tier of local government with responsibility for almost all local government functions within their area including local planning and building control, local roads, council housing, environmental health, markets and fairs, refuse collection, recycling, cemeteries, crematoria, leisure services, parks, and tourism. They are also responsible for education, social services, libraries, main roads, public transport, trading standards, waste disposal and strategic planning. Fire, police and ambulance services are provided jointly with other authorities through the Avon Fire and Rescue Service, Avon and Somerset Constabulary and the Great Western Ambulance Service.

Bath and North East Somerset's area covers part of the ceremonial county of Somerset but it is administered independently of the non-metropolitan county. Its administrative headquarters are in Bath. Between 1 April 1974 and 1 April 1996, it was the Wansdyke district and the City of Bath of the county of Avon. Before 1974 that the parish was part of the Bathavon Rural District.

The parish is represented in the House of Commons of the Parliament of the United Kingdom as part of the Bath constituency. It elects one Member of Parliament (MP) by the first past the post system of election.

== Religious sites ==
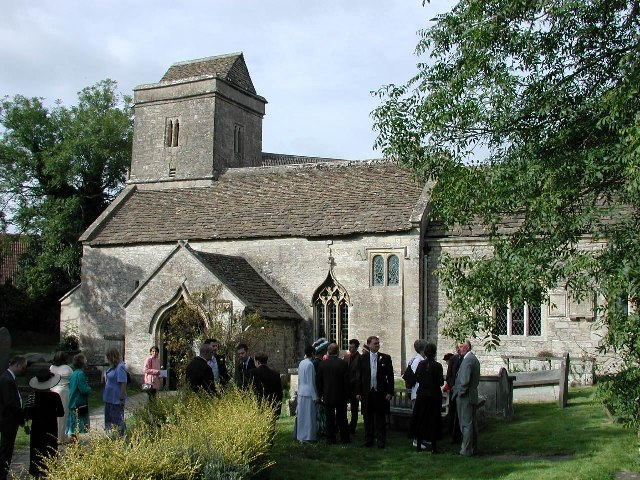
Church of St Mary

The Church of St Mary dates from the 12th century. It has been designated by English Heritage as a Grade II* listed building. The church contains monuments to the parents of William Prynne, the Puritan parliamentarian, who was born in the village in 1600. There is a ledger slab of John Wood the Elder, architect of Georgian Bath. The tomb probably contains the bodies of John Wood the Younger and his wife.

== Notable people ==
- William Prynne (1600–1669), Puritan lawyer, voluble author, polemicist and politician.
- John Gunning (1734–1798), an English surgeon.
- Edith Carrington (1853–1929) animal rights activist and promoter of vegetarianism.
- Jonathan Dimbleby (born 1944) and his ex-wife, Bel Mooney were residents.
- Peter Gabriel (born 1950) musician, singer, songwriter; had studios at Ashcombe House
