= Empire Hotel, Bath =

Empire Hotel
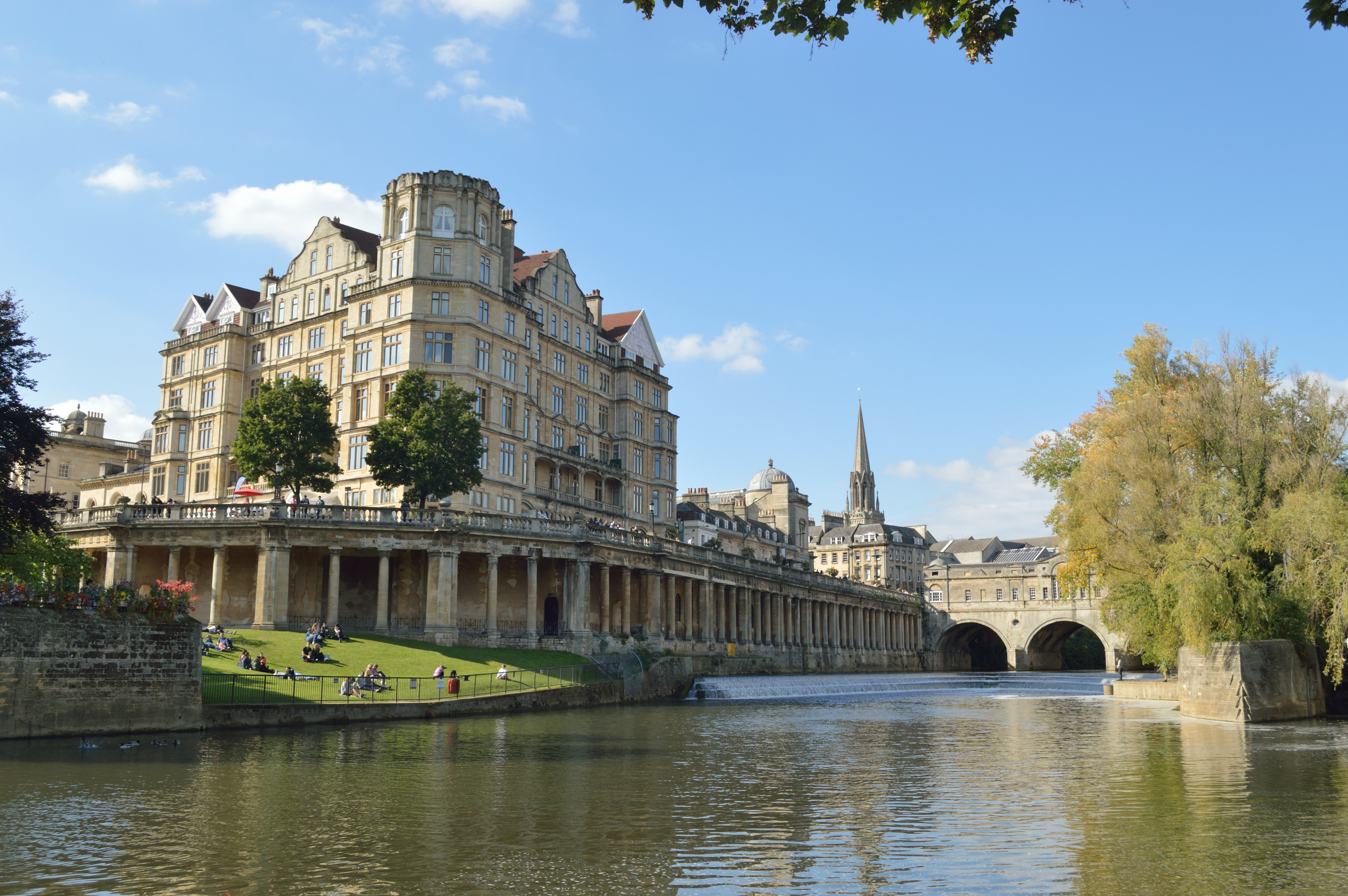
- From the south showing Pulteney Bridge

- Location within Somerset
- 51°22′56″N 2°21′28″W
- Location: Orange Grove, Bath, Somerset, BA2 4DF

History
- Built: 1901
- Built for: Alfred Holland

Site notes
- Architect: Major C E Davis

Listed Building – Grade II
- Official name: Empire Hotel
- Designated: 17 July 1989
- Reference no.: 1394205

The Empire is a former hotel in Bath, Somerset, England, built in 1901 and designated as a Grade II listed building. It is situated on Orange Grove, close to both Bath Abbey and Pulteney Bridge and adjacent to the Old Police Station.

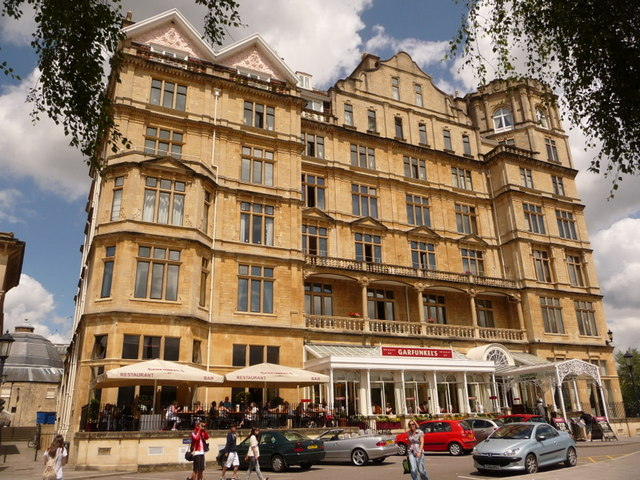
Hotel frontage

It was designed by the Bath City Architect Major Charles Edward Davis for the hotelier Alfred Holland and built from Bath Stone, on the site of the Athenaeum. It was described by Sir Nikolaus Pevsner as a ‘monstrosity and an unbelievable piece of pompous architecture’.

The building occupies a large L-shaped block. It is six storeys high plus the octagonal corner tower. The front of the building onto Orange Grove has eight bays and the side overlooking the River Avon has nine bays.

The architecture of the roof shows the three classes of people, a castle on the corner for upper class, a house for the middle classes and a cottage for the lower classes.

During World War II it was used by the Admiralty as a postal sorting office and remained in their possession until the 1990s. In 1996 it was then refurbished and became apartments and a restaurant.
