= Parade Gardens =

Park in Bath, England

The Parade Gardens
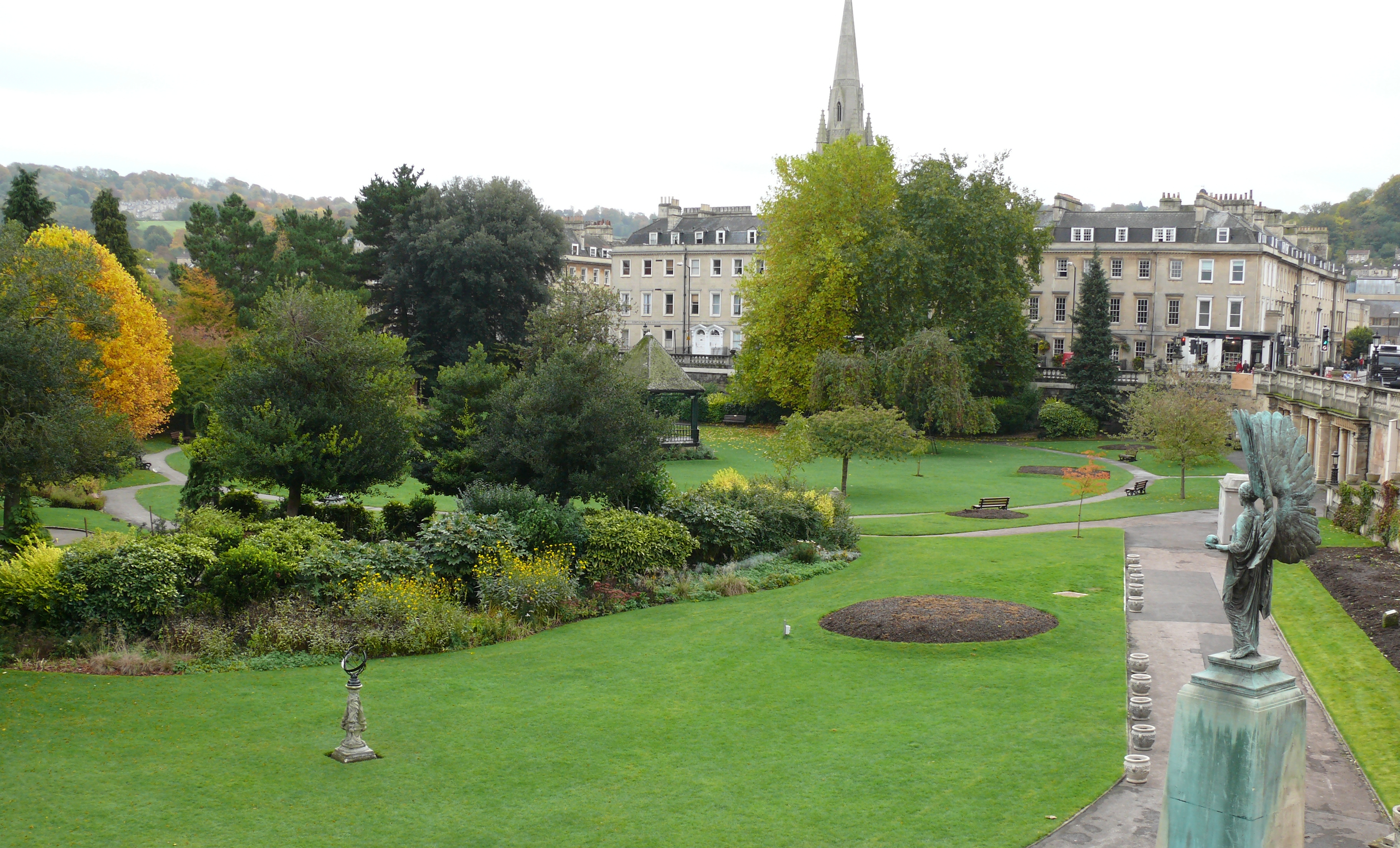
- The park from Grand Parade
- Interactive map of The Parade Gardens
- Location: Bath England
- Coordinates: 51.38119°N 2.35667°W
- Area: 1.25 hectares (3.1 acres)
- Created: 1709
- Operator: Bath and North East Somerset
- Status: Open all year

The Parade Gardens is a grade II listed park in Bath, Somerset, England. The gardens are situated to the south of the Empire Hotel, Bath and 250 yards to the east of Bath Abbey.

There is a small fee to enter Parade Gardens, while residents with a Discovery Card have free access. There is also a cafe on site.

== History ==
Originally known as St James's Park, it was laid out in 1709 to accompany Assembly Rooms for Spa visitors, which were built by Thomas Harrison and conceived by Beau Nash. With the construction of the Bath Royal Literary and Scientific Institution in 1824 on the site of the former assembly rooms, the gardens became known as the Institution Gardens.
