= Balcha Safo =

Ethiopian military commander (1863–1936)

Dejazmach Balcha Safo ባልቻ ሳፎ
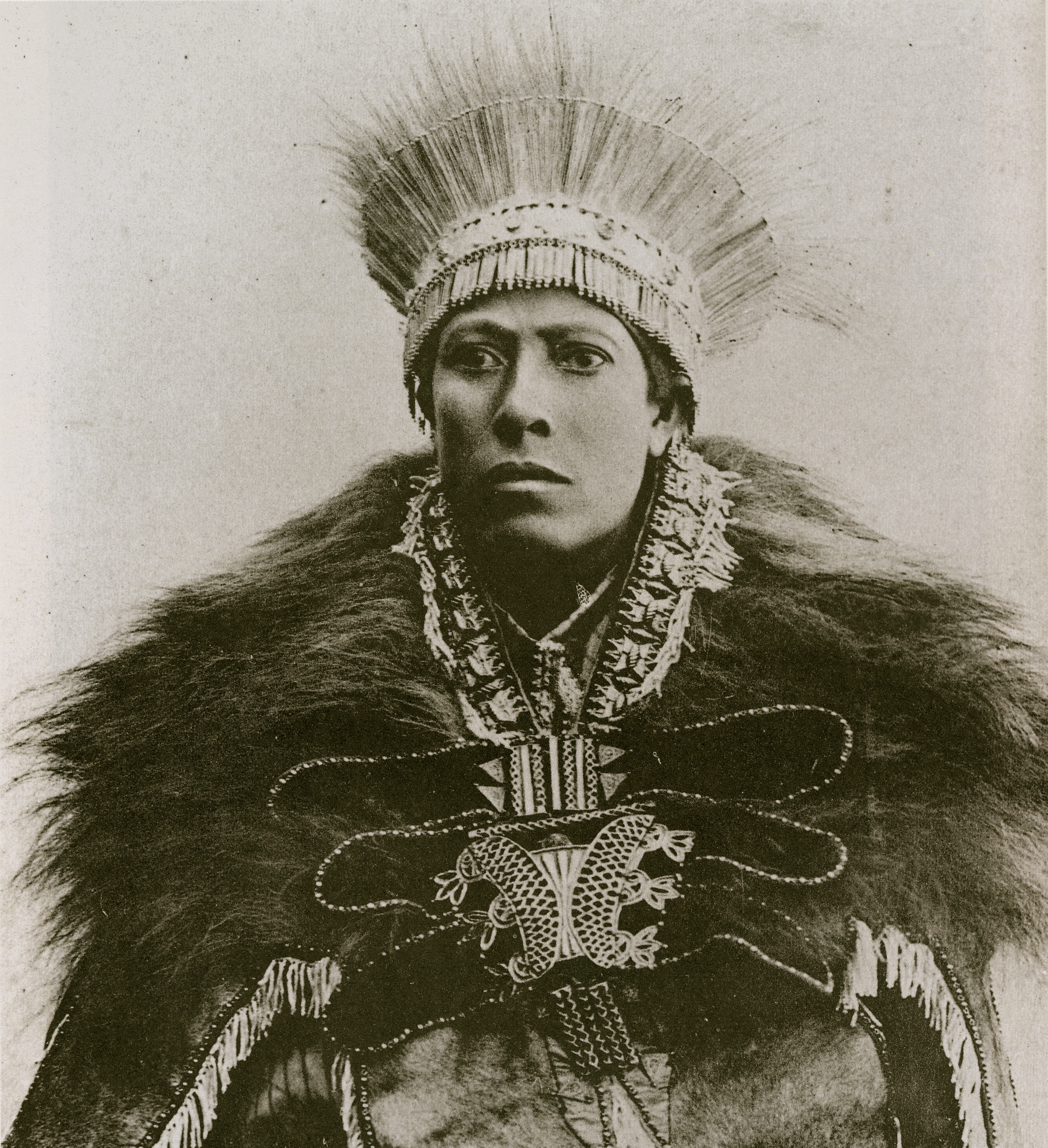
- Born: 1860; Agämga, Ethiopian Empire
- Died: 6 November 1936 (aged 75–76); Bäččo, Italian East Africa
- Military career
- Allegiance: Ethiopian Empire
- Service years: 1880s–1936
- Conflicts: First Italo-Ethiopian War; Battle of Adwa; Second Italo-Ethiopian War

Dejazmach Balcha Safo (Amharic: ባልቻ ሳፎ; 1863 – 6 November 1936), popularly referred to by his horse-name Abba Nefso, was an Ethiopian military commander and lord protector of the crown, who served in both the First and Second Italo-Ethiopian Wars.

He made his reputation, according to oral tradition, at the Battle of Adwa (March 1, 1896), and was rewarded with elevation to the aristocratic status of Dejazmach. Later Balcha was appointed a provincial Governor (Shum). He was later a key member of the conservative provincial elite who, in the 1920s, were often at odds with the modernising reforms and rising power of the Regent, Ras Tafari Makonnen. Tafari Makonnen would later force Dejazmach Balcha into retirement, albeit an honourable one, in 1928, from which he would emerge in 1935 to fight against the Fascist invasion, resulting in his death in 1936.

== Biography ==
=== Early career ===
Originally of humble birth, Balcha Safo, along with Habte Giyorgis Dinagde, was one of many castrated prisoners of war taken during Menelik II's expansions into the Hadiya state under Hassan Enjamo between 1875 and 1889. His ethnicity is disputed with some sources claiming he was an ethnic Gurage, and others claiming he was an ethnic Oromo. Balcha came to the notice of Emperor Menelik II who brought him back to Addis Ababa where he was educated. He distinguished himself at the imperial court and showed particular skill in military exercises and theory. He made his reputation during the First Italo-Ethiopian War when he served as the chief gunner of the Ethiopian artillery. According to oral tradition, he would achieve fame and notoriety during the Battle of Adwa when he replaced a dead cannoneer and began to aim the cannon himself. After the war he was rewarded with elevation to the aristocratic status of dejazmach.

From 1898 to 1908, Balcha was Shum (or governor) of Sidamo province. After the death of Dejazmach Yilma Mekonen in 1907, he became the Shum of Harar from 1910 to 1914. From 1917 to 1928, he again served as Shum of Sidamo.

=== Conflict with Haile Selassie ===
A conservative who had been loyal to the memory of the deceased Emperor Menelik, Balcha was one of the leading nobles who challenged the growing power of the regent Ras Tafari (who later became Emperor Haile Selassie). A blunt old warrior, he did not trust the young regent, unlike most other warlords who by this time had all submitted themselves to Tafari in his ambition to consolidate power. In a deft political manoeuver, which has since been seen as an example of Haile Selassie's cunning, in 1928 the regent invited Balcha to the capital for a feast in Balcha's honour. Balcha arrived 11 February with several thousand men, most of whom he left camped right outside of Addis Ababa at an area called Nifas Silk. Balcha and around 600 of his men functioning as bodyguards went to the feast itself in Addis, and spent the evening "generally insolent and threatening in conversation." Ras Tafari was nervous in private. Zewditu begged Balcha in the name of her late father, Emperor Menelik II.

Meanwhile, the regent sent Ras Kassa Haile Darge to Balcha's camp, where he lied to the troops, stating that Balcha and Tafari were in agreement, and then paid the soldiers Balcha had left there. This led to Balcha's army exchanging their weapons for gold and other monetary or valuable gifts and dispersing. At the same time, the regent quietly appointed Dejazmach Birru Wolde Gabriel to replace Balcha as governor of Sidamo. These simultaneous acts deprived Balcha of his ability to resist, a loss he discovered only after he returned to the camp. Balcha promised a peaceful transition to the empress and laid down his sword, which was the traditional way of giving up his power in respect to the Empress.

=== Death ===
During the Second Italo-Abyssinian War, Balcha Safo came out of retirement to fight against the Italians. Major Mesfin Sileshi, an agent of the imperial government in exile who was coordinating resistance in occupied Ethiopia, writes of his fate in a letter to Haile Selassie I thus:

The enemy went to where his Excellency Dejazmatch Balcha lived, and campaigned against him. The people betrayed him, and all his men were annihilated. He and two of his servants, three people all together, were surrounded. A white man came to him and asked, are you Dejazmatch Balcha? When he said 'Yes I am', the white man said 'Surrender your arms, and untie your pistol belt'. Dejazmatch Balcha said, 'I am not here to surrender my arms', and he killed the white man; then, he and his two servants died instantly without having much suffering.

== See also ==
- Ethiopian coup d'état of 1928
- Gugsa Welle
- Hailu Tekle Haymanot
