= Haile Selassie's speech to the League of Nations (1936) =

Speech condemning Italian aggression against Ethiopia

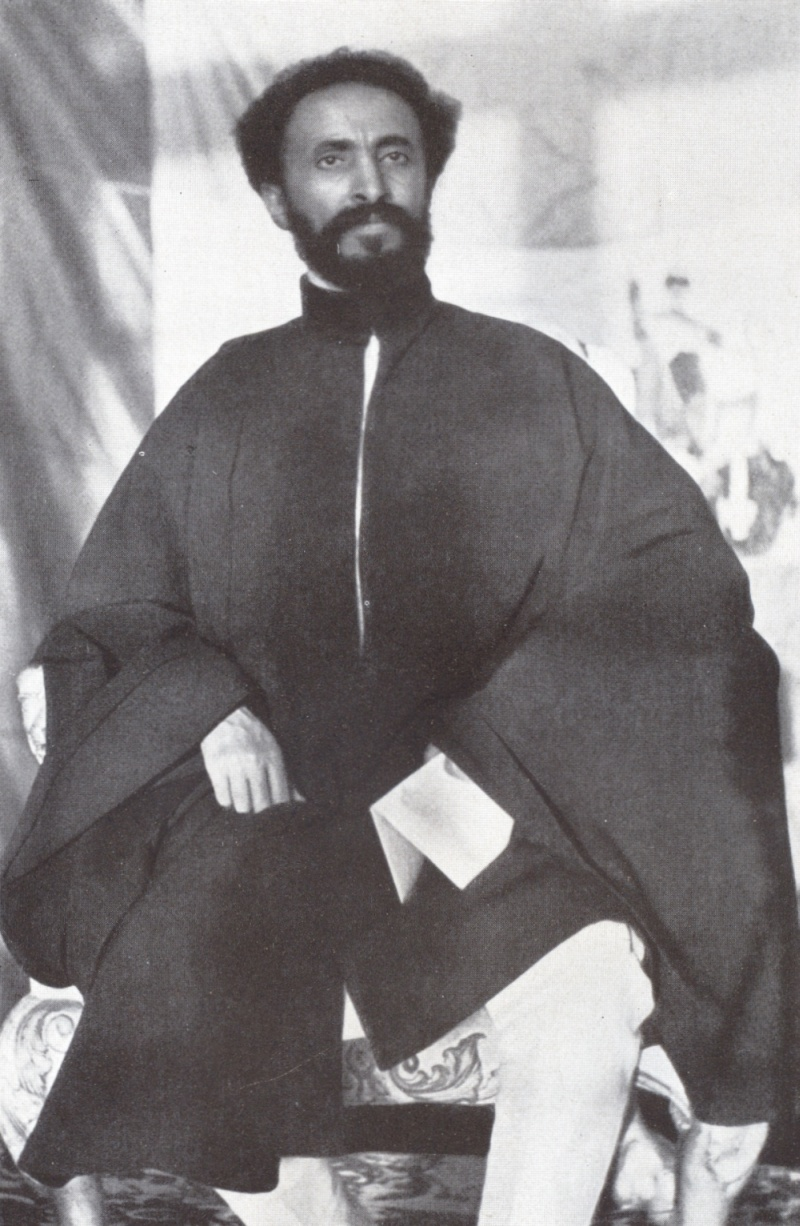
Haile Selassie, Emperor of Ethiopia

On June 30th, 1936, Emperor Haile Selassie of Ethiopia delivered a speech condemning Italian military aggression against Ethiopia, which had forced him into exile. The speech took place in League of Nations assembly in Geneva. The speech also denounced the Italian army's use of chemical weapons against the Ethiopian population.

Haile Selassie intervened by being the head of one of the member states of the international organization since September 28, 1923. On November 18, 1935, for attacking another member state, the League of Nations had already condemned Fascist Italy by imposing economic sanctions on it, which were approved by 50 states, with only Italy voting against and Austria, Hungary and Albania abstaining. The sanctions consisted of a ban on the export of Italian products abroad and prohibited Italy from importing raw materials, weapons and receiving credit.

== Prerequisites ==
On October 3, 1935, without a formal declaration of war, General Emilio De Bono had ordered Italian troops stationed in Eritrea to cross the Ethiopian border by rapidly reaching and occupying Adwa, Axum and Adigrat. The Italian attack on Ethiopia violated Article 16 of the Covenant of the League of Nations, signed by both states:

«Should any Member of the League resort to war in disregard of its covenants under Articles 12, 13 or 15, it shall ipso facto be deemed to have committed an act of war against all other Members of the League, which hereby undertake immediately to subject it to the severance of all trade or financial relations, the prohibition of all intercourse between their nationals and the nationals of the covenant-breaking State, and the prevention of all financial, commercial or personal intercourse between the nationals of the covenant-breaking State and the nationals of any other State, whether a Member of the League or not».

— The Covenant of the League of Nations, Article 16

On October 6, 1935, the Council of the League of Nations officially condemned the Italian attack; the condemnation was formalized four days later by the Assembly, which established a committee of eighteen members to study measures to be taken against Italy. On November 3, the sanctions discussed by the committee were approved, deciding that they would come into effect on the 18th.

On November 14, Mussolini, replaced De Bono with Marshal Pietro Badoglio. After a three-month pause, the marshal, with a convergent maneuver supported by artillery and air force, resumed the initiative, achieving the victory of Amba Aradam (Feb. 11–15, 1936) and annihilating the bulk of the Ethiopian army (80,000 men). Amba Alagi was occupied on Feb. 28, and the negus' bodyguard was defeated at Lake Ashenge on March 31.

The defense of Addis Ababa and the south of the country then presented itself as very critical, partly because the bulk of the army had been hit hard, especially by the Italian air force and artillery, with the use of gas (mustard gas and phosgene) against which the Ethiopians could only oppose a few hundred old gas masks, which were not always functional. It was decided not to defend the capital and to let the emperor flee the country partly for fear of seeing the city completely destroyed by aviation.

== Contents of the speech ==
Shortly before the capture of Addis Ababa, therefore, Haile Selassie had chosen voluntary exile from his country and went to Bath, Great Britain, after staying for a few days in Jerusalem. He then went to Geneva, for his speech, in the absence of the Italian government delegation, specially withdrawn for the occasion.

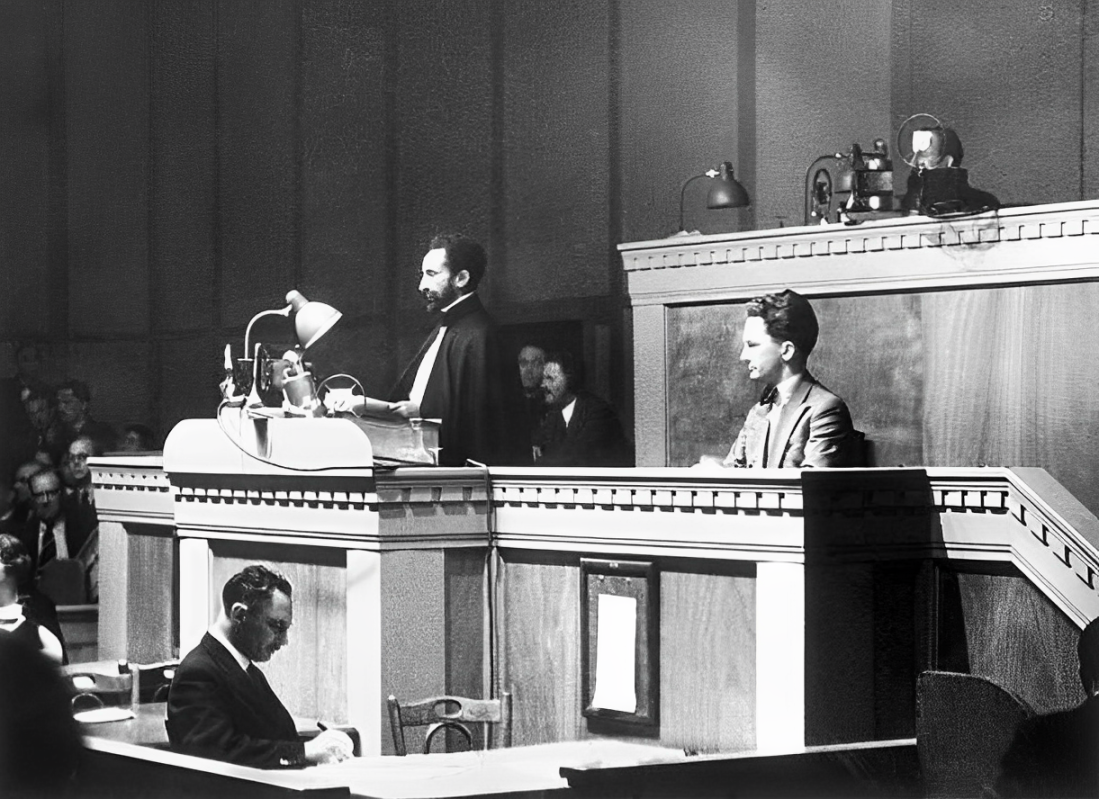
At the League of Nations appealing Italy's invasion in 1936

On 12 May 1936, the League of Nations allowed Selassie to address the assembly. In response, Italy withdrew its League delegation. Selassie was introduced as "His Imperial Majesty, the Emperor of Ethiopia" (Sa Majesté Imperiale, l'Empereur d'Éthiopie), to jeering and whistling by Italian journalists. The Romanian delegate Nicolae Titulescu shouted "To the door with the savages!", and the journalists were removed from the hall. Selassie responded with a speech.

Although fluent in French, Selassie chose to deliver his speech in his native Amharic. He asserted that Italy was employing chemical weapons on military and civilian targets alike. He pointed out that the same European states that found in Ethiopia's favor at the League of Nations were refusing Ethiopia credit and matériel while aiding Italy. Noting that his own "small people of 12 million inhabitants, without arms, without resources" could never withstand an attack by a large power such as Italy, with its 42 million people and "unlimited quantities of the most death-dealing weapons", he contended that the aggression threatened all small states, which were in effect reduced to vassal states in the absence of collective action. He admonished the League that "God and history will remember your judgment."

These were the main points of the Ethiopian emperor's speech:

«[…] It is my duty to inform the Governments assembled in Geneva, responsible as they are for the lives of millions of men, women and children, of the deadly peril which threatens them, by describing to them the fate which has been suffered by Ethiopia. It is not only upon warriors that the Italian Government has made war. It has above all attacked populations far removed from hostilities, in order to terrorize and exterminate them. […] Special sprayers were installed on board aircraft so that they could vaporize, over vast areas of territory, a fine, death-dealing rain. Groups of nine, fifteen, eighteen aircraft followed one another so that the fog issuing from them formed a continuous sheet. It was thus that, as from the end of January, 1936, soldiers, women, children, cattle, rivers, lakes and pastures were drenched continually with this deadly rain. In order to kill off systematically all living creatures, in order to more surely to poison waters and pastures, the Italian command made its aircraft pass over and over again. That was its chief method of warfare. […] Apart from the Kingdom of the Lord there is not on this earth any nation that is superior to any other. Should it happen that a strong Government finds it may with impunity destroy a weak people, then the hour strikes for that weak people to appeal to the League of Nations to give its judgment in all freedom. God and history will remember your judgment. […]»

— Haile Selassie, Appeal to the League of Nations, 12 May 1936

== Consequences ==
On June 30, 1936, under pressure from Argentina, a special assembly of the League of Nations met at which Haile Selassie proposed not to recognize the Italian conquests in Ethiopia but his proposal was rejected by 23 votes against, 1 in favor and 25 abstentions. The following July 4, at the same assembly after a little more than 7 months after their promulgation, the League of Nations lifted the sanctions, dealing a mortal blow to the credibility of the League itself.

At the beginning of 1936, Time named Selassie "Man of the Year" for 1935, and his June 1936 speech made him an icon for anti-fascists around the world. He failed, however, to get the diplomatic and matériel support he needed. The League agreed to only partial sanctions on Italy, and Selassie was left without much-needed military equipment. Only six nations in 1937 did not recognise Italy's occupation: China, New Zealand, the Soviet Union, the Republic of Spain, Mexico and the United States.

However, the Italian conquest was never formally recognized by the international organization, as Ethiopia's seat in the assembly remained attributed to Haile Selassie. It was denied, likewise, any form of reparations, including moral reparations, requested by Italy. For this reason, on December 11, 1937, from the balcony of Piazza Venezia, Benito Mussolini announced his exit from the League of Nations.

However, it had to wait until Italy entered World War II (June 10, 1940) for one of the world powers, the United Kingdom, to move to liberate Ethiopia. Italian troops were pushed back toward the center of the country, with the help of Ethiopian resistance, until the surrender was achieved with the honor of arms of Amedeo Duke of Aosta on the heights of Amba Alagi.

On May 5, 1941, Negus Haile Selassie entered Addis Ababa in an uncovered Alfa Romeo, preceded by Colonel Orde Wingate on a white horse. Negusa Nagast, having just returned to Addis Ababa, urged all Ethiopians not to take revenge on the Italians or repay them for the atrocities they had committed for five years.

Italian East Africa finally ceased to exist under the blows of the British Army in November 1941, with the surrender of the last bastion of Gondar.

Italy's renunciation of all its colonies was formalized with the signing of the Treaty of Paris on February 10, 1947. With Ethiopia, also a counterpart in the signing of the peace treaty, Italy ended an uninterrupted state of war that began in 1935 and, implicitly, admitted the illegality of the annexation carried out in 1936, on the international legal level.

== See also ==
- Italian war crimes
- East African campaign
- Ethiopian Empire
