= James Wilson (architect) =

- Born: 1816
- Died: 1900 (aged 83–84); Bath
- Known for: Architect

James Wilson (1816–1900) was a prominent Victorian architect practising in Bath, Somerset and partner in the firm Wilson & Willcox.

On 12 January 1843 he married Maria Buckley of Llanelli, and in 1846 they had a son, James Buckley Wilson, who followed his father to also become an architect.

== List of buildings ==
- Wesleyan Methodist Chapel, Bridport, Dorset (1838)
- St. Stephen's Church, Walcot, Bath (1840–1845)
- Church of St Leonard, Shipham (1843)
- Kingswood School, Bath (1851)
- Royal High School, Bath (1858)
- Church of St Mary, Charlcombe (restoration) (1857–1861)
- Holy Trinity Church, Norton Malreward (rebuilding) (1860–1861)
- National Westminster Bank, 24 Milsom Street, Bath (1865)
- Carmarthen Public Rooms (Assembly Rooms), King Street, Carmarthen,(1854)
- Fairfield House, Bath
