= Radio Voice of the Gospel =

Lutheran based international radio station in Ethiopia

Radio Voice of the Gospel (RVOG) was a Lutheran World Federation international radio station based in the Ethiopian capital Addis Ababa, starting in 1961.

In 1977, the station was nationalized by the Derg military government and renamed to the Radio Voice of Revolutionary Ethiopia.

== History ==
Radio Voice of the Gospel was established by the Lutheran World Federation in Ethiopia during 1961, under a 30-year contract with the imperial government of Haile Selassie. The stations 200 kW transmitters, which could reach much of Africa and Asia were the most powerful on the continent. It also had a medium wave transmitter serving Addis Ababa. It broadcast in English, French, and a number of African and Asian languages.

Ethiopia was still under the Emperor Haile Selassie, and political activism and free speech were very limited in the country. It was therefore subject to some censorship and limitations, particularly on the local Amharic service. Censorship increased after the overthrow of Haile Selassie in 1974, when the Marxist government suppressed broadcasts that they considered counterrevolutionary.

Additionally, some of the donors came from the fundamentalist wing of the church and were clearly anxious their approach should dominate, particularly in such matters as creationism.

=== Nationalization (1977) ===
The station was nationalized by the Provisional Military Governing Council of Ethiopia on March 12, 1977. It was renamed Radio Voice of Revolutionary Ethiopia.

== Programming ==
Many of Radio Voice of the Gospel programs were compiled in nine regional studios in the countries to which they were broadcast in 19 different languages. It aimed to be more general than many church-owned stations, as it broadcast news largely based on Reuters, as well as drama and other features. The staff were international and ecumenical. The news staff was highly respected for the accuracy of their news reporting.
