= Timeline of Bath, Somerset =

History

Coordinates: 51.38°N 2.36°W

The following is a timeline of the history of the city of Bath, Somerset, England.

== Prehistory ==
- Mesolithic – Human activity on Bathampton Down.
- Iron Age – Hillfort on Bathampton Down.
- 863 BC (traditional date) – In legend, King Bladud discovers the sacred spring at Bath.

== 1st to 5th centuries ==
- c. 60s – First Roman temple structures built, around the hot water springs; completed by 76.
- 2nd century
  - Early: Baths extended.
  - Late: Baths vaulted.
- 3rd century – By this time, Bath city walls are built for defence.
- 300–350 – Evidence for Christians in Bath.
- 5th century – Following the end of Roman rule in Britain, Bath is largely abandoned.

== 6th to 10th centuries ==
- 516 – Battle of Badon: A famous battle against the Saxons, where a progenitor of King Arthur is said to have been victorious; perhaps on Bathampton Down.
- 577 – Battle of Deorham: Bath is captured by the Saxons and, being north of the River Avon, then falls within the Saxon petty-kingdom of the Hwicce.
- 628 – Following the Battle of Cirencester, the Hwicce come under the rule of the kingdom of Mercia.
- 676 – Abbess Berta founds a convent under the protection of Osric, king of the Hwicce.
- 757 – Cynewulf of Wessex grants land in Bath to monks of St Peter.
- 781 – Offa of Mercia takes control of the monastery from the Bishop of Worcester.
- 878 – Bath becomes a royal borough (burh) of Alfred the Great, in his kingdom of Wessex (and also in the county of Somerset).
- c. 900 – Market active.
- 973 – 11 May (Whitsunday): Edgar, King of England 959–975, is crowned and anointed with his wife Ælfthryth at Bath Abbey by Dunstan, Archbishop of Canterbury. The Church of St Swithin, Walcot, is founded at about this date.
- c. 980 – Ælfheah becomes abbot of Bath.

== 11th to 17th centuries ==
- 1087 – Town, Abbey and mint pass to John of Tours.
- 1090 – John of Tours, Bishop of Wells, moves the episcopal seat to Bath, giving it city status.
- Early 12th century? – King's Bath built.
- 1102 – Bath fair active.
- 1137 – Major fire.
- 1148–1161 – Abbey consecrated between these dates.
- c. 1174 – St John's Hospital founded.
- 1273 – Old Bridge extant.
- 1285 – Church of St Michael's Within built in St John's Hospital.
- c. 1333 – Monks of the abbey establish a weaving trade in Broad Street.
- 1371 – Market mentioned in charter.
- c. 1435 – Hospital of St Catherine established.
- 1482 – "Sally Lunn's House" built.
- c. 1495 – St Mary Magdalen, Holloway, built as a chapel to a leper's hospital.
- 1499 – Abbey found derelict by Oliver King, Bishop of Bath and Wells, who begins its reconstruction.

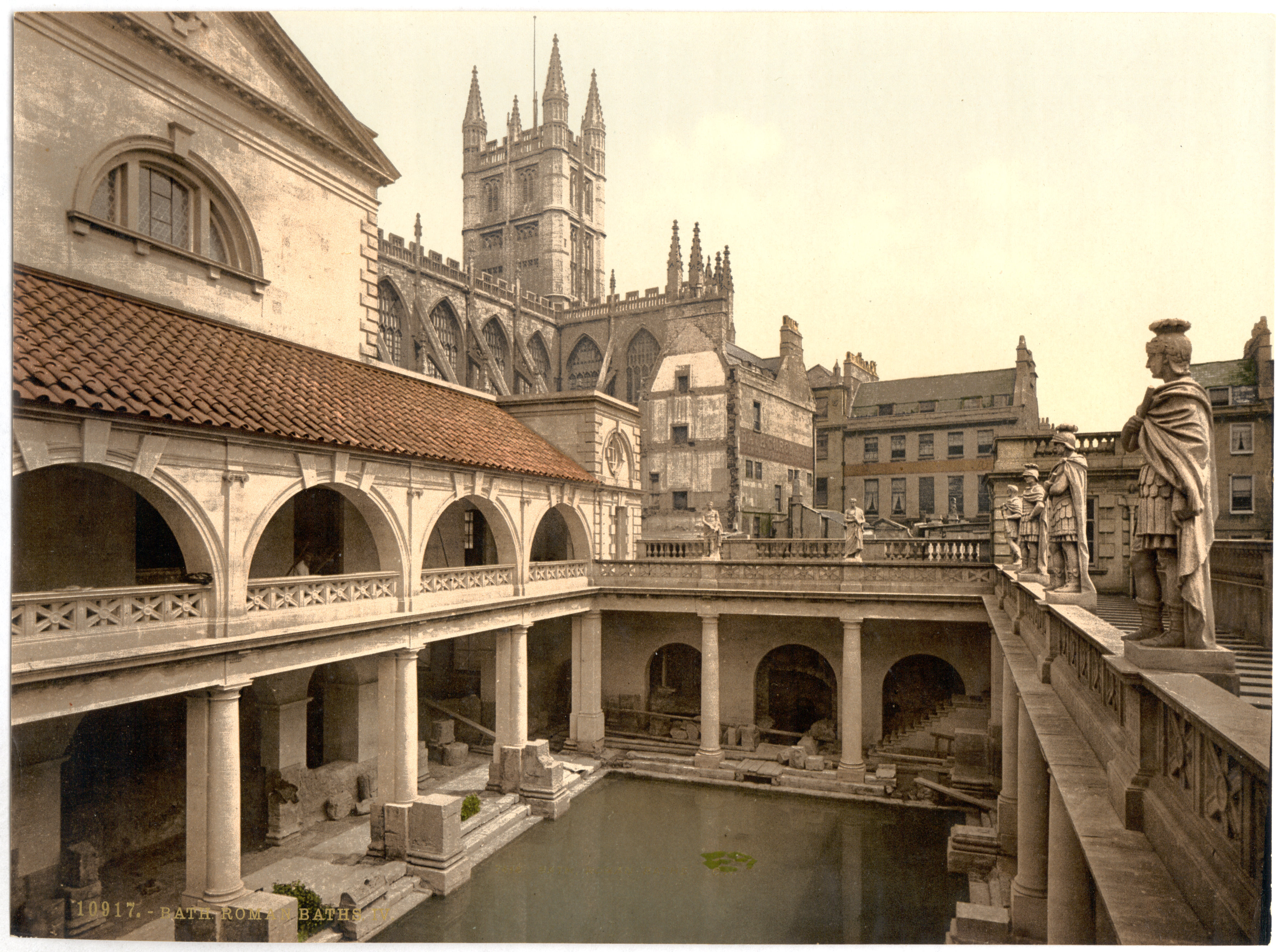
Roman Baths with Abbey beyond, as at c.1900

- 1533 – Rebuilding of Abbey substantially completed by this date.
- 1539 – January: Dissolution of the monasteries: Abbey surrendered.
- 1552
  - King Edward's School founded as a grammar school.
  - Approximate date: First market house built.
- 1572
  - The roofless Abbey is given to the corporation of Bath for restoration as a parish church.
  - Dr. John Jones makes the first public endorsement of the medicinal properties of the city's water.
- 1576 – Queen's Bath built.
- 1578 – Drinking fountain installed in the Baths.
- 1590 – Bath chartered (city status confirmed) by Elizabeth I.
- 1597 – Deserving poor given free use of the mineral water.
- 1608 – Bellott's Hospital established.
- 1613 and 1615 – Anne of Denmark, wife of James VI and I, visits Bath for her health.
- 1616 – Abbey Church consecrated.
- 1625–1628 – Guildhall rebuilt.
- 1643 – 5 July: Battle of Lansdowne fought near the city.
- 1657 – Regular coach service from London.
- 1676 – Dr. Thomas Guidott publishes A discourse of Bathe, and the hot waters there. Also, Some Enquiries into the Nature of the water, the first published account of the medicinal properties of the city's water.
- 1677 – West Gate pub in business.
- 1680 – Supposed origin of the Sally Lunn bun.
- 1687 – Mary of Modena, queen consort of James II of England, visits in the hope that Bath waters would aid conception; by the end of the year she is pregnant with James Francis Edward Stuart.

== 1700s ==
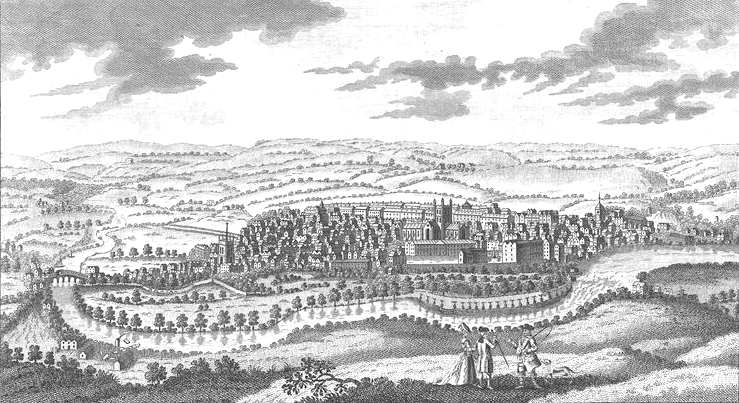
View of Bath, 18th century

- 1702–1703 – Queen Anne visits.
- 1704 – First pump-room built; Richard "Beau" Nash is appointed Master of Ceremonies.
- 1705 – First theatre in the city built.
- 1707 – Bath Turnpike Trust established.
- 1708 – Harrison's Assembly Rooms, with a riverside walk, open.
- 1711 – Bluecoat school founded as a charity.
- 1712 – March: Ralph Allen appointed postmaster.
- 1715 – Church of St Michael's Within in St John's Hospital rebuilt to the design of William Killigrew.
- 1720 – Ralph Allen begins to control the Cross and Bye Posts in the south west of England.
- 1717 – Approximate date: Green Street developed.
- 1721 – Bluecoat school opens.
- 1724 – James Leake (bookseller) in business.
- 1725–1727 – Guildhall extended.
- 1725
  - John Wood, the Elder, newly returned to Bath, presents his plans for the city to Ralph Allen.
  - Approximate date: the physician William Oliver settles in Bath.
- 1726
  - Ralph Allen begins buying up Combe Down and Bathampton Down Mines for building stone.
  - James Brydges, 1st Duke of Chandos, buys Chandos House to let as lodgings.
- 1727–1728 – John Wood, the Elder, executes his first private commission in Bath, a new building for St John's Hospital.
- 1727–1736 – Beaufort Square laid out by John Strahan.
- 1727
  - Gilt bronze head from cult statue of Sulis Minerva from the Roman Temple is found by workmen excavating a sewer, and placed in the guildhall.
  - 15 December: River Avon made navigable downstream to Bristol.
  - Approximate date: construction of Ralph Allen's Town House begins.
- 1728
  - St John's Gate ("Trim Bridge") built.
  - First Bath Racecourse recorded.
- 1728–1736 – Queen Square laid out by John Wood, the Elder.
- 1730s – Parade Gardens laid out.
- 1731 – A tramroad is opened to carry building stone from Ralph Allen's Combe Down mine through his Prior Park estate down to the Kennet and Avon Canal.
- c. 1733
  - Thomas Warr Attwood becomes de facto first Bath City Surveyor and Bath City Architect.
  - First printing press established in the city, by Felix Farley of Bristol.
- 1734
  - Royal visit by William IV, Prince of Orange, marked by an obelisk of 1735.
  - Construction begins on Ralph Allen's house at Prior Park to the design of John Wood, the Elder.
  - 25 December: St Mary the Virgin opened near Queen Square as the city's first proprietary chapel (foundation stone laid 25 March 1732; designed by John Wood, the Elder).
- 1735
  - Construction of New Bridge to carry the Bristol Road over the Avon begins.
  - Gay Street laid out by John Wood, the Elder.
- 1738 – Royal visit by Frederick, Prince of Wales with Princess Augusta, marked by erection of an obelisk in Queen Square.
- 1739
  - Royal National Hospital for Rheumatic Diseases (Royal Mineral Water Hospital, "The Min") established as The Hospital or Infirmary in the City of Bath; it will be built to plans of 1738 by John Wood, the Elder.
  - Portrait painter William Hoare settles in Bath.
- c. 1741 – North Parade built by John Wood, the Elder.
- 1742
  - Ralph Allen is elected mayor, and his residence at Prior Park is completed.
  - Church of St Swithin, Walcot, rebuilt following storm damage in 1739.
  - William Frederick (bookseller) in business.
- 1743–1749 – South Parade built to the design of John Wood, the Elder.
- 1744
  - 27 February: The Bath Journal, the city's first newspaper and a predecessor of the Bath Chronicle, begins publication.
  - Sham bridge in Ralph Allen's Prior Park Landscape Garden estate designed by Alexander Pope.
- 1745 – Beau Nash forced to retire as Master of Ceremonies due to anti-gambling laws.
- 1747 – Bath Pauper Scheme originates.
- 1750
  - 27 October: Old Orchard Street Theatre opens as St James' Theatre.
  - Approximate date: Bath Oliver biscuit devised by William Oliver.
- 1751 – Pump Room enlarged, truncating the King's Bath.
- 1752 – King Edward's School rebuilt in Broad Street.
- 1754
  - February: The Circus house construction begins to the design of John Wood, the Elder.
  - Old Bridge rebuilt.
- 1754–1755 – North and South Gates demolished (West Gate demolished c. 1776).
- 1755
  - Bath Advertiser newspaper begins publication.
  - Roman Bath rediscovered.
  - Kingston Baths built for Evelyn Pierrepont, 2nd Duke of Kingston-upon-Hull on the site of the Abbey cloister.
  - Palladian bridge in Ralph Allen's Prior Park Landscape Garden built to a design by Richard Jones.

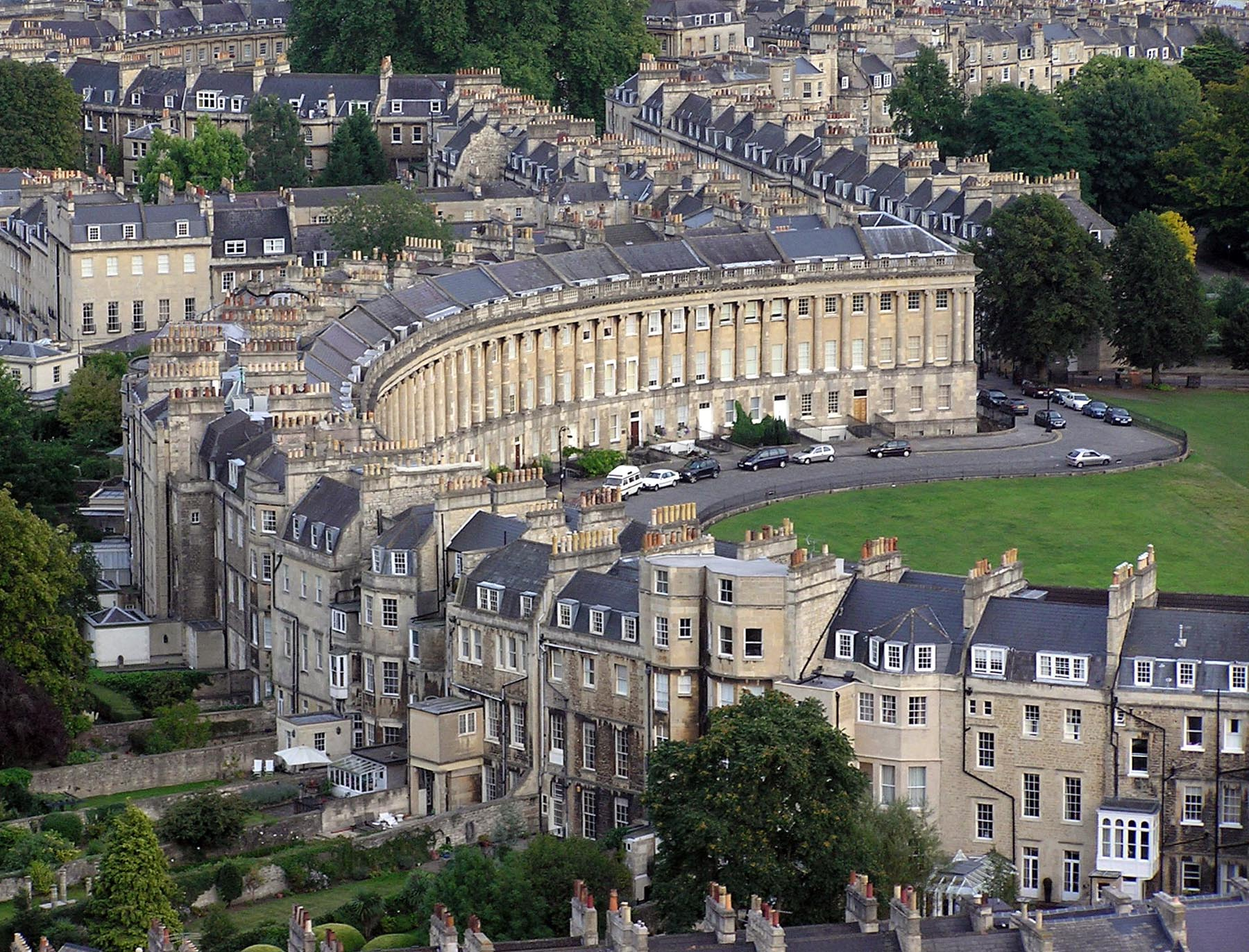
Royal Crescent, climax of the Woods' Bath

- 1758–1774 – Portrait painter Thomas Gainsborough resident at 17 The Circus.
- 1759 – William Pitt, Secretary of State, from 7 The Circus, orders James Wolfe to capture Quebec City.
- 1760 – Gay Street developed.
- 1762 – Sham castle built as an eye-catcher in Ralph Allen's Prior Park Landscape Garden to a design by Richard Jones.
- 1762–1763 – Milsom Street built.
- 1765 – 6 October: The second chapel of the Countess of Huntingdon's Connexion is opened in The Paragon; George Whitefield is the first preacher.
- 1766
  - Christopher Anstey publishes his long satirical epistolary poem The New Bath Guide.
  - Astronomer William Herschel arrives in Bath, initially as organist of the Octagon Chapel (completed 1767); his house in New King Street is built.
  - 20 December: Royal Crescent house construction begins to the design of John Wood, the Younger.
- 1767–1768 – Brock Street built to the design of John Wood, the Younger.
- 1768 – The Theatre Royal, Bath (Old Orchard Street Theatre) and Theatre Royal, Norwich, assume these titles having been granted Royal Patents, making them England's only legal provincial theatres.
- 1769 – The Circus ("King's Circus") houses completed to the design of John Wood, the Younger.
- 1769–1774 – Pulteney Bridge constructed to the design of Robert Adam.

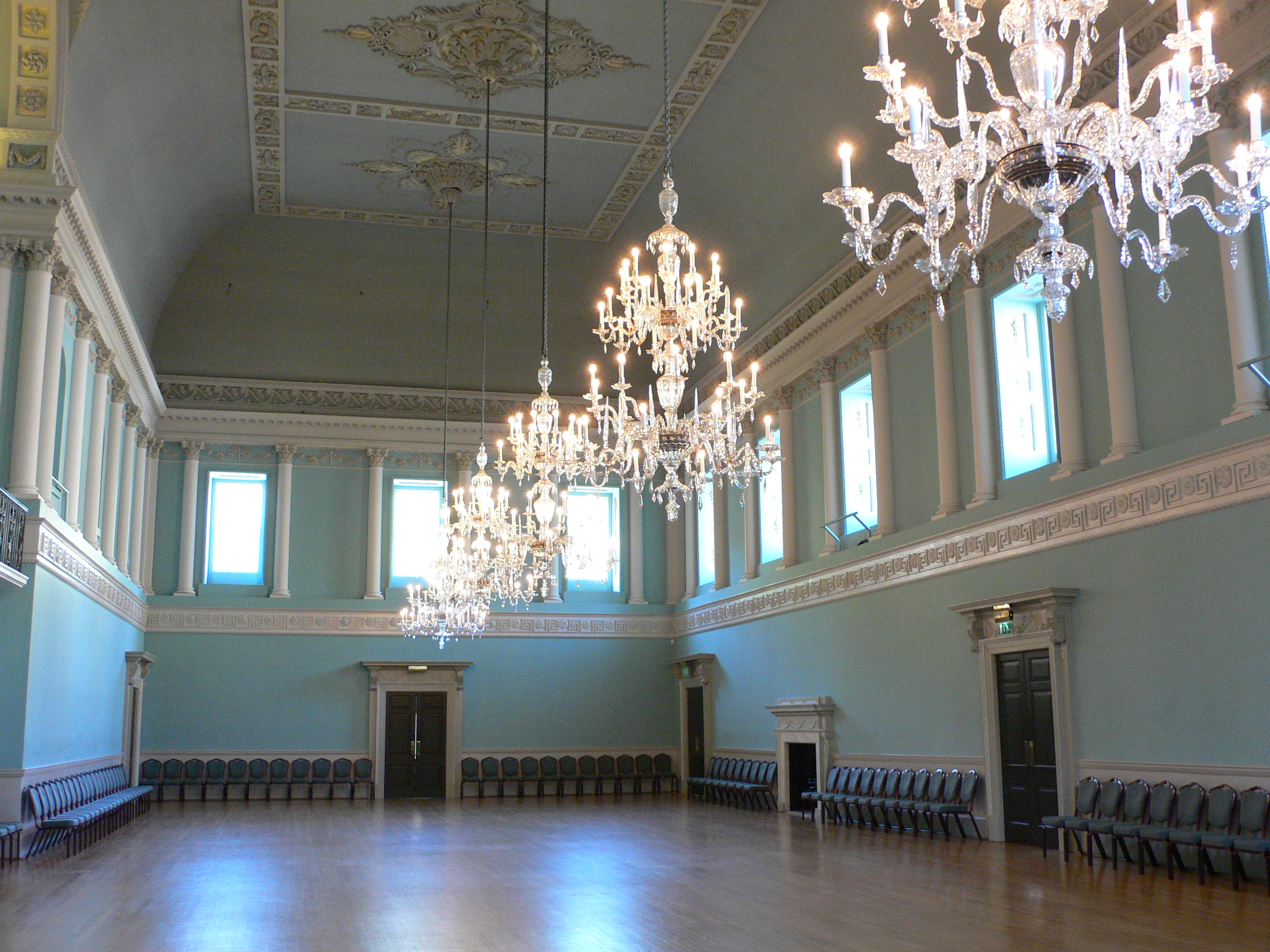
Bath Assembly Rooms

- 1771 – 30 September: New (Upper) Assembly Rooms, built to the design of John Wood, the Younger, open with Capt. William Wade as Master of Ceremonies.
- 1772 – 18 March: Playwright Richard Brinsley Sheridan elopes with soprano Elizabeth Ann Linley from her home in Royal Crescent.
- 1774 – Royal Crescent houses completed to the design of John Wood, the Younger.
- 1775–1777 – Hot Bath built to the design of John Wood, the Younger.
- 1775 – 15 November: Architect Thomas Warr Attwood is killed by the collapse of a derelict building which he is inspecting on the site of the intended new Guildhall and is succeeded as Bath City Surveyor by Thomas Baldwin.
- 1777–1779 – Wesleyan church built in New King Street.
- 1777
  - 28 August: Society for the Encouragement of Agriculture, Arts, Manufactures, and Commerce founded.
  - Church of St Swithin, Walcot, rebuilt to the design of John Palmer, opens.
  - Card room added to the Assembly Rooms.
  - Real tennis court opens in Julian Road.
- 1778–1782 – Sarah Siddons appears at the Old Orchard Street Theatre.
- 1778 – New Guildhall is completed to the design of Thomas Baldwin, and the previous one is demolished.
- 1779 – 28 December: Bath Philosophical Society founded; ceases 1787.
- 1780
  - 13 June: Anti-Catholic unrest.
  - Roman Great Bath rediscovered.
  - First record of the Sally Lunn bun.
  - Approximate date: Oxford Row built.
- 1781 – 13 March: William Herschel makes the first observation of the planet Uranus from his back garden in New King Street.
- 1783–1784 – Cross Bath built by Thomas Baldwin.
- 1784 – 2 August: John Palmer demonstrates his mail coach system.
- 1787–1788 – Camden Crescent built by John Eveleigh.
- 1788–1794 – Laura Place built by Thomas Baldwin and John Eveleigh.
- 1788 – Bath Casualty Hospital (a predecessor of the Royal United Hospital) opens.
- 1789–1793 – Lansdown Crescent built by John Palmer.
- 1789
  - July: Bath Improvement Act 1789 (29 Geo. 3. c. 73) passed by Parliament, giving the city council powers to purchase, demolish and rebuild.
  - South Colonnade for Grand Pump Room scheme completed by Thomas Baldwin.
  - Congregational church opened in Argyle Street.
- 1790
  - 9 April: Thomas Baldwin is appointed first architect and surveyor to the Improvement Commissioners formed under the Bath Improvement Act 1789.
  - North Colonnade for Grand Pump Room scheme completed by Thomas Baldwin.
  - Roman temple pediment discovered during work near the Baths.
  - Somerset Place construction begins to the design of John Eveleigh.
- 1791 – 31 March: Bath Street construction begins to the design of Thomas Baldwin.
- 1792
  - March: Norfolk Crescent construction begins to the design of John Palmer.
  - Bath City Dispensary and Infirmary founded.
  - Lansdown Course races begin.
- 1793
  - September: Laying out of Sydney Gardens begins to the design of Thomas Baldwin.
  - Bath bank crash.
- 1795
  - 11 May: Sydney Gardens open as Bath Vauxhall Gardens, commercial pleasure grounds. Sydney Hotel is under construction here.
  - 28 December: Grand Pump Room opens. Begun around 1789 by Thomas Baldwin, construction work is completed 1793–1799 by John Palmer.
  - Harmonic Society formed.

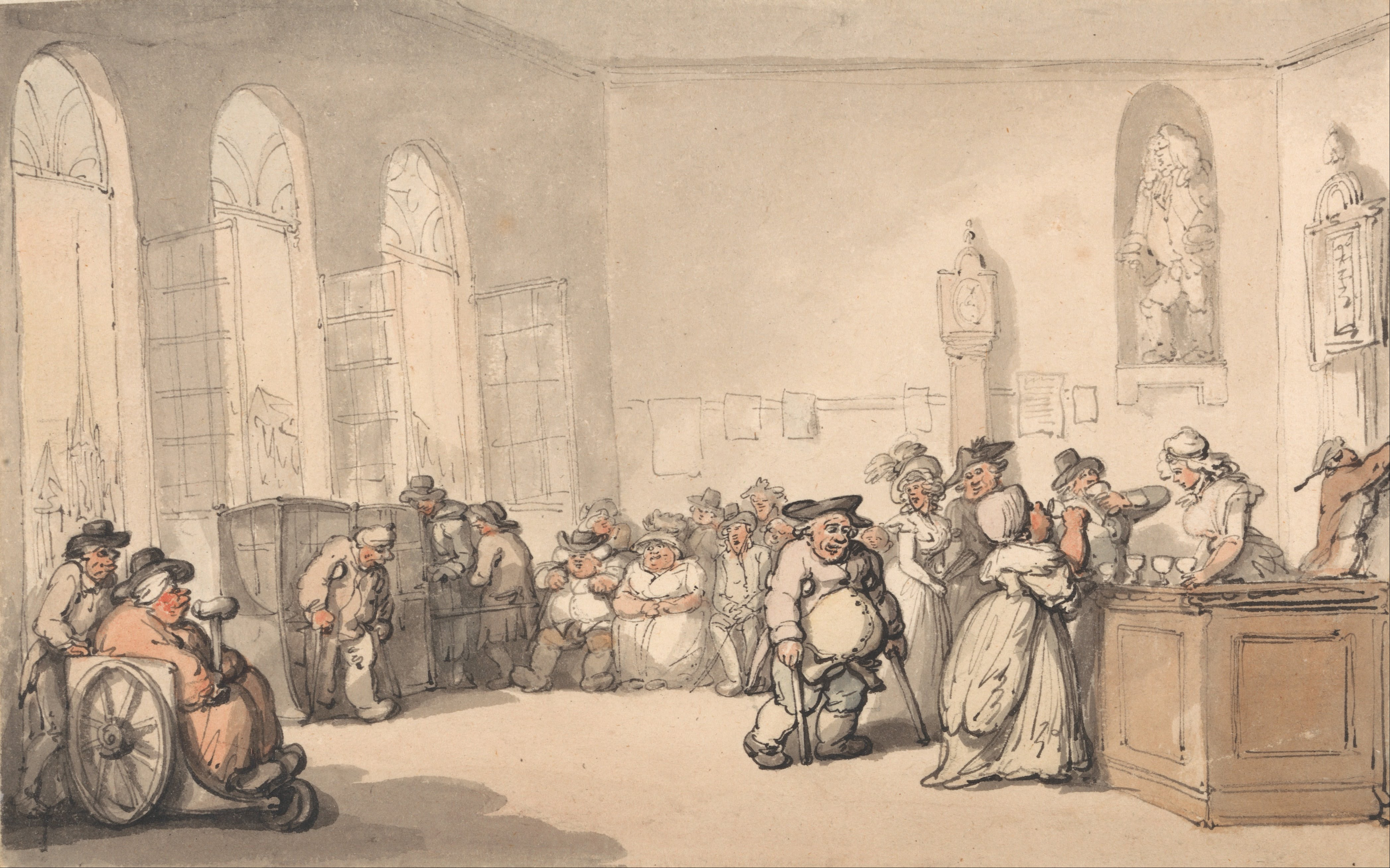
Thomas Rowlandson, Comforts of Bath – The Pump Room (1798)

- 1796? – York Street opened.
- 1797–1798 – Cross Bath rebuilt by John Palmer.
- 1797
  - 30 May: Abolitionist William Wilberforce marries Barbara Spooner at the Church of St Swithin, Walcot, the couple having met on 15 April in Bath.
  - House of Antiquities opened to display archaeological finds.
- 1798 – 7 November: Christ Church dedicated as a proprietary chapel built to the design of John Palmer.
- 1799
  - By summer: William Smith produces the first large-scale geological map, of the area round Bath.
  - 8 August: Lace goes missing from Elizabeth Gregory's milliner's shop; Jane Leigh Perrot (Jane Austen's aunt) is charged with its theft.
  - 11 December: William Smith draws up a table of strata round Bath.
  - Sydney Hotel opens in Sydney Gardens to the design of Charles Harcourt Masters.
  - A new Philosophical Society is established.

== 1800s ==
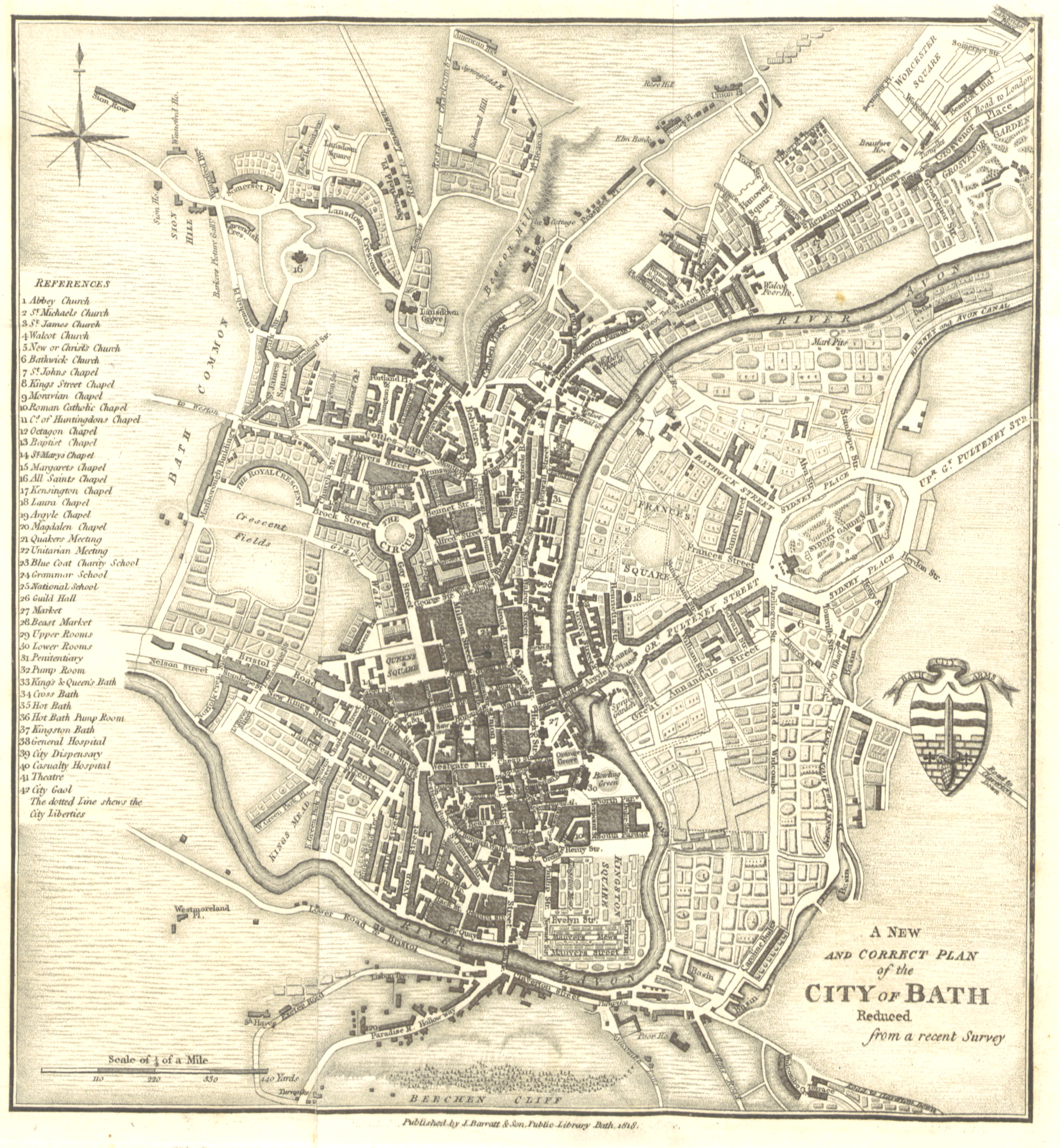
Map of the city, drawn in 1818

- 1800
  - North side of Pulteney Bridge collapses in a flood.
  - S. W. Simms (bookseller) in business.
  - Approximate date:
    - Jewish congregation formed.
    - First houses in Sydney Place completed to the design of Thomas Baldwin.
- 1801
  - January: Jane Austen becomes resident in Bath when her father retires here; she will remain until summer 1806, living mostly in the newly built Sydney Place.
  - 1 May: Kennet and Avon Canal opens from Bath to Devizes; completion of the locks at the latter place at the end of 1810 creates inland water communication to London.

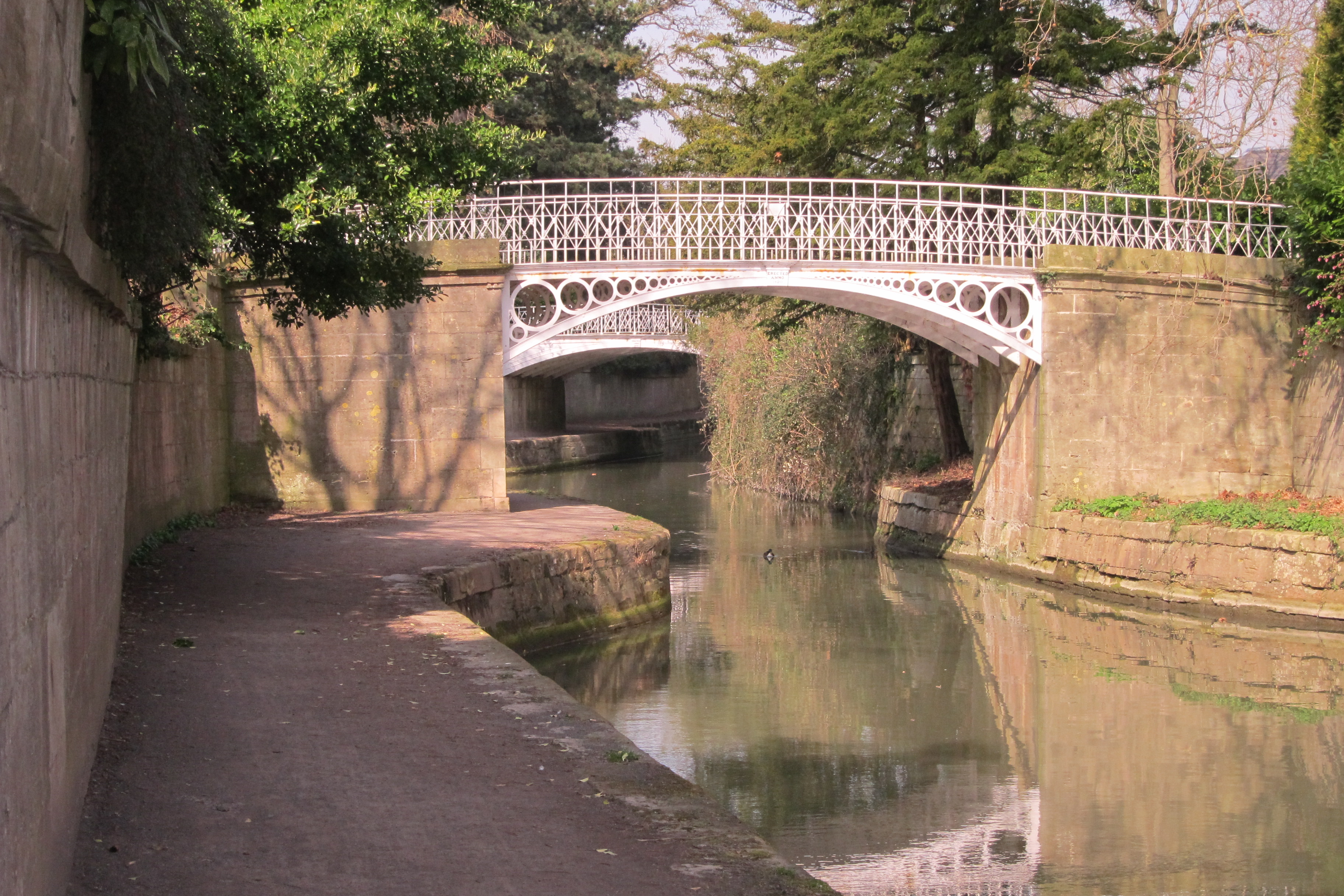
Footbridges over Kennet and Avon Canal in Sydney Gardens

- 1802 – Balloon ascents from Sydney Gardens.
- 1805
  - 1 January: Jane Austen's father, the Rev. George Austen, dies in Bath; he is buried at the Church of St Swithin, Walcot, where he had been married in 1764
  - Penitentiary established.
  - New Theatre Royal (replacing the Old Orchard Street Theatre) and Barker's Picture Gallery open.
  - De Montalt Mill, Combe Down, established as a paper mill.
- 1806 – East wing of Grand Pump Room completed.
- 1808 – New houses in Sydney Place completed to the design of John Pinch the Elder.
- 1810
  - Lancasterian Free School established.
  - Union Street completed.
- 1812 – Jewish Burial Ground, Combe Down opened.
- 1813 – Claverton Pumping Station opens, allowing the Bath locks on the Kennet and Avon Canal to be used in periods of low rainfall.
- 1815
  - Cleveland Pools opened.
  - Stothert's iron foundry established.
- 1816 – 8 January: Third Bath Philosophical Society formed.
- 1817
  - Royal visit by Queen Charlotte.
  - Atkinson & Tucker (booksellers) in business.
- 1818 – Bath Gas Light Company established.
- 1819 – Masonic Hall dedicated.
- 1821 – 6 February: Original Assembly Rooms in Terrace Walk destroyed by fire.
- 1822
  - Norfolk Crescent completed to the design of John Pinch the Elder.
  - Post office in Broad Street.
- 1823 – Jolly & Son, drapers, established.
- 1824 – Bath Royal Literary and Scientific Institution founded (given Royal status 1837).
- 1825
  - 19 January: Bath Royal Literary and Scientific Institution opens its premises on the site of the original Assembly Rooms in Terrace Walk.
  - The Corridor, one of the world's earliest retail arcades, is built to the design of architect Henry Goodridge.
  - Mechanics Institute opens.
  - Lansdown Cricket Club formed.
- 1826
  - Bath United Hospital opens in Beau Street in a building designed by John Pinch the Elder.
- 1827
  - Beckford's Tower (Lansdown Tower) is completed by Henry Goodridge for William Beckford.
  - Cleveland Bridge opened as a toll bridge.
  - John Loudon McAdam appointed Surveyor of the Bath Roads, a post which he holds until his death in 1836.
  - Partis College completed as almshouses for women by Ann and Fletcher Partis.
- 1829 – New basin at baths completed.
- 1830
  - Victoria Park is opened by the 11-year-old Princess Victoria as a public pleasure ground.
  - Prior Park College is opened as the Sacred Heart College.
- 1831 – Jolly's department store opens as The Bath Emporium.
- 1832 – Sydney Buildings constructed.
- 1833–1834 – George Phillips Manners restores the Abbey, replacing the pinnacles.
- 1834–1837 – St Michael's Without church rebuilt to the design of George Phillips Manners.
- 1834 – Stothert, Rayne & Pitt acquire the Newark Iron Foundry.
- 1836
  - 1 January: Local government reformed under terms of the Municipal Corporations Act 1835; city corporation is obliged to surrender control over Abbey appointments.
  - 28 March: Bath Poor Law Union formed and begins construction of a new workhouse at Combe Down.
  - 30 May: Major fire at Prior Park.
  - North Parade Bridge built in cast iron to the design of William Tierney Clark and Victoria suspension bridge built to the patent of James Dredge Sr.
- 1837 – Victoria Column erected in Victoria Park to mark the princess's coming-of-age.
- 1839 – Isaac Pitman moves to Bath.
- 1840
  - 2 May: First Penny Black postage stamp sent from 8 Broad Street by Thomas Musgrave.
  - 6 June: Novelist Fanny Burney dies in Bath; she is buried at the Church of St Swithin, Walcot.
  - 31 August: Great Western Railway opened from Bath to Bristol Temple Meads; 30 June 1841 through to London Paddington.
- 1841
  - January: Major floods.
  - November: First "Daguerreotype Institute" (photographic studio) in Bath opened, in Subscription Walk Gardens.
- 1846 – City authorised to provide drinking water from springs at Bathampton and Batheaston.
- 1847 – Commercial Reading Room and Tottenham Library founded.
- 1851 – Kingswood School moves to Bath.
- 1852 – Bath School of Art founded.
- 1854 – Post Office in York Buildings, George Street (1750s).
- 1855
  - February: Bath Natural History and Antiquarian Field Club established by Leonard Jenyns.
  - Bath Quartet Society established.
  - Corn market built in Walcot Street.
- 1859–1860 – New Bluecoat school built.
- 1861–1863 – St John the Evangelist Roman Catholic Church in South Parade is built to the design of Charles Francis Hansom.
- 1861 – Guildhall Market built.
- 1862 – 18 April: A major fire causes the Theatre Royal to be rebuilt.
- 1863 – Widcombe ("Halfpenny") footbridge first built over the Avon in wood.
- 1864
  - Bath United Hospital given its Royal prefix on opening of its Albert wing.
  - Locksbrook Cemetery opens as Walcot Cemetery.
- 1865
  - Bath Rugby founded by members of Lansdown Cricket Club as Bath Football Club.
  - Old Orchard Street Theatre becomes a Masonic Hall.
- 1867
  - Alexander Graham Bell rigs up a telegraph line in Bennett Street while teaching at Somerset College.
  - James Irvine records remains of the Roman temple of Sulis Minerva.
- 1869–1885 – Excavations of Roman Baths by Maj. C. E. Davis, the city architect.
- 1869
  - 4 August: Queen Square station opens to passengers as terminus of the Midland Railway's Mangotsfield and Bath Branch Line.
  - Original White Horse Inn (opposite the Pump Room) is demolished.
- 1870–1873 – St Andrew's Church built to the design of George Gilbert Scott.
- 1874
  - 20 July: Somerset and Dorset Railway begins operating from Queen Square station.
  - Manvers Estate sold.
- 1875
  - Bath High School for Girls established by the Girls' Public Day School Company.
  - ?: Bath City Police established.
- 1877 – 6 June: Widcombe footbridge collapses, killing eleven, causing it to be rebuilt as a wrought-iron lattice girder.
- 1878
  - Bath College opens.
  - Corporation acquires Kingston Baths.
- 1880
  - 28 February: Bath Golf Club founded
  - 24 December: Bath Tramways Company begins operating horsecars.
  - Approximate date: Blaine's Folly built.
- 1881 – Population: 52,557.
- 1882 – Holburne Museum fine art collection bequeathed to the city.
- 1883 – Queen's Bath largely demolished, revealing a Roman circular bath.
- 1886 – First telephone exchange.
- 1887 – Botanical Gardens opened in Royal Victoria Park.
- 1888 – Bath Photographic Society formed.
- 1889
  - 1 April: Bath becomes a county borough under terms of the Local Government Act 1888.
  - 21 June: William Friese-Greene, working in Bath since c. 1875, patents a "chronophotographic" camera, an early form of movie camera.
  - New douche and massage baths, incorporating parts of the Queen's Bath and of the 1786 New Private Baths, and including an arch over York Street, completed to the design of C. E. Davis.
  - Landslide destroys nine houses in Camden Crescent.
  - Twerton Co-operative Society, a consumers' co-operative, opens its first shop.
  - Bath Association Football Club formed.
- 1890 – Electricity generating station begins operation.
- 1891 – Bath Fire Brigade and Ambulance Service established.
- 1892 – Technical training begins, origin of City of Bath Technical School and Bath College of Domestic Science.
- 1893 – Holburne Museum opens in Charlotte Street.
- 1894 – Major floods.
- 1896 – April: Bath Municipal Technical College and Bath City Secondary School established in a new north extension of the Guildhall.
- 1897
  - 18 October: Victoria Art Gallery foundation stone laid to commemorate the diamond jubilee of Queen Victoria.
  - Henrietta Gardens laid out to commemorate the diamond jubilee of Queen Victoria.
  - Roman Baths and associated Concert Room designed by J. M. Brydon are opened to the public.

== 1900s ==
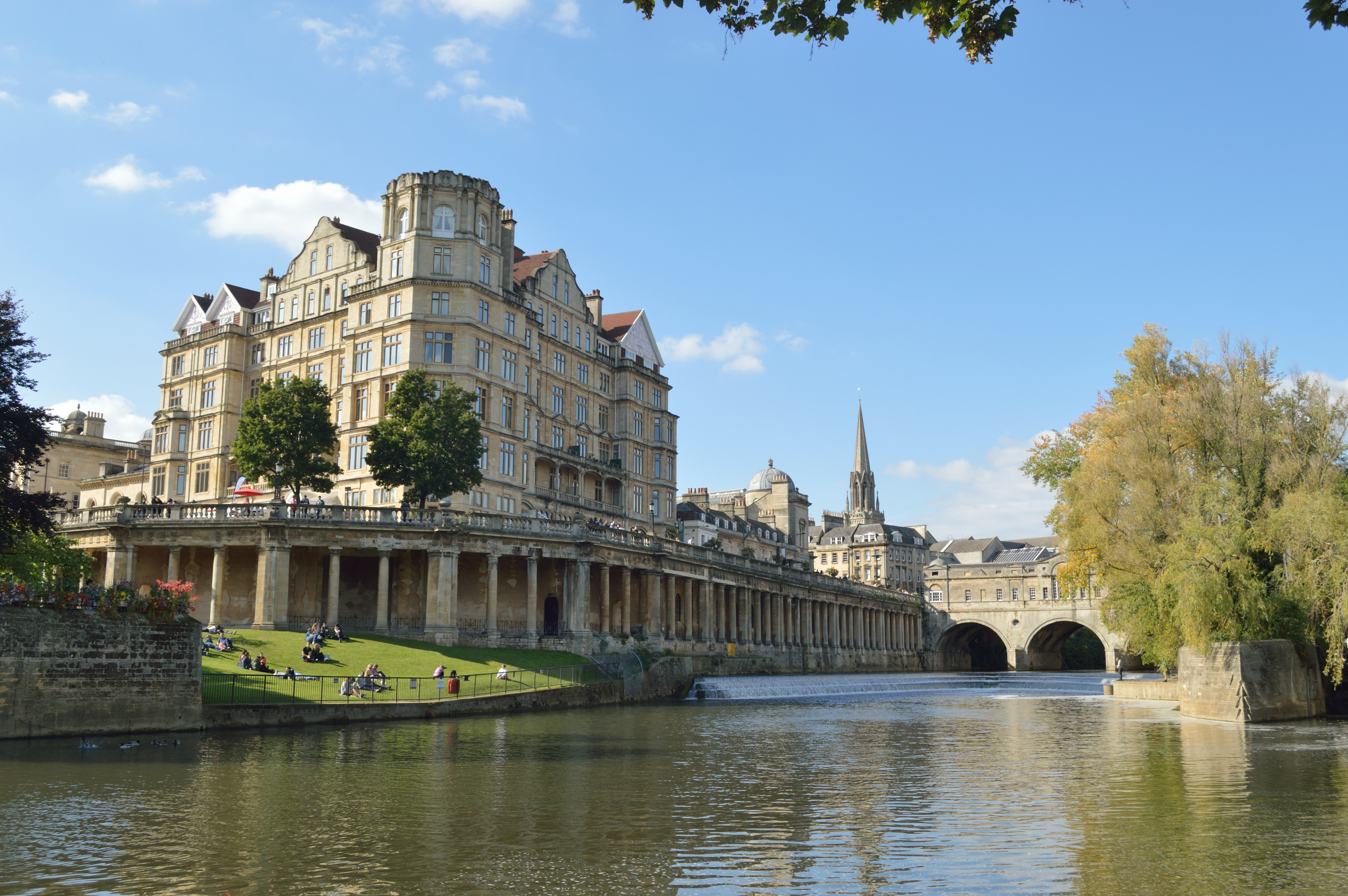
Empire Hotel with Pulteney Bridge beyond

- 1900
  - May: Victoria Art Gallery and Reference Library opens.
  - New (redbrick) houses for the working classes erected in Dolemeads.
- 1901
  - Empire Hotel in business (designed by C. E. Davis).
  - Population: 49,839.
- 1902 – 25 July: Horse tram system closes for electrification, being temporarily replaced by horse-drawn omnibuses.
- 1904 – 2 January: Bath Electric Tramways Company begins operating.
- 1905 – 12 December: Midland Bridge, a replacement lattice-girder bridge over the Avon, is opened.
- 1907 – Bath School of Pharmacy established.
- 1909
  - c. February: Old Bath Preservation Society, predecessor of Bath Preservation Trust, set up.
  - 19–24 July: Historical Pageant staged in Royal Victoria Park.
  - St Winifred's Quarry built as a house on Combe Down to the design of Charles Voysey.
- 1910 – Jubilee Hall Cinema operating in Assembly Rooms.
- 1911 – 9 November: Twerton and parts of Charlcombe and Weston are incorporated within the city boundary under terms of the Local Government Act 1888.
- 1915
  - T. R. Hayes, furnishers, established.
  - December: Robert Atkinson is commissioned to produce a post-war plan for the city.
- 1916
  - Bath War Hospital set up at Combe Park.
  - Holburne Museum moves to the former Sydney Hotel.
- 1920 – Bath Tramways Motor Company set up to operate motor buses.
- 1923
  - Roman hot plunge baths excavated.
  - Kingston Baths demolished.
- 1925
  - Bath Corporation Act includes conservation powers.
  - Lansdown Water Tower built.
- 1927
  - 16 May: New Post Office and Telephone Exchange opens in Northgate Street.
  - 3 November: City war memorial dedicated.
- 1929
  - 20 June: Cleveland Bridge, having been acquired in 1925 by Bath Corporation and rebuilt, is freed of toll.
  - July: Roman Catholic Church of Our Lady & St Alphege completed in Oldfield Park to the design of Sir Giles Gilbert Scott.
- 1931 – October: Assembly Rooms purchased by the Society for the Protection of Ancient Buildings with funds provided by Ernest Cook, and transferred to the National Trust for restoration and preservation.
- 1932
  - Bath Royal Literary and Scientific Institution moves to premises in Queen Square.
  - 11 December: Royal United Hospital opens on the Combe Park site and its former premises are taken over by Bath Technical College.
- 1934 – Bath Preservation Trust founded.
- 1936–1941 – Haile Selassie, deposed Emperor of Ethiopia, spends most of his exile in Bath.
- 1936 – North Parade Bridge rebuilt in stone-faced reinforced concrete.
- 1937
  - Bath Corporation Act includes additional conservation powers.
  - A school crossing patrol ("lollipop lady") is appointed, one of the earliest in the UK.
- 1938
  - 15 October: Assembly Rooms reopened after restoration.
  - Kilowatt House on Claverton Down, a unique example of modernist architecture in the city, is completed to the design of Mollie Taylor as a residence for electrical engineer Anthony Greenhill.

London Street, Bath by Walter Sickert, 1941

- 1939
  - 6 May: The Bristol Tramways and Carriage Company, operator of the Bath tramways, converts the last remaining routes to motor bus operation.
  - 3 September: On the outbreak of World War II, departments of the Admiralty begin evacuation to Bath.
- 1942 – 25–27 April: Bath Blitz: Three German aerial bombing raids as part of the "Baedeker Blitz" kill 417; among the buildings destroyed or badly damaged are the newly restored Assembly Rooms, St Andrew's Church and All Saints Chapel.

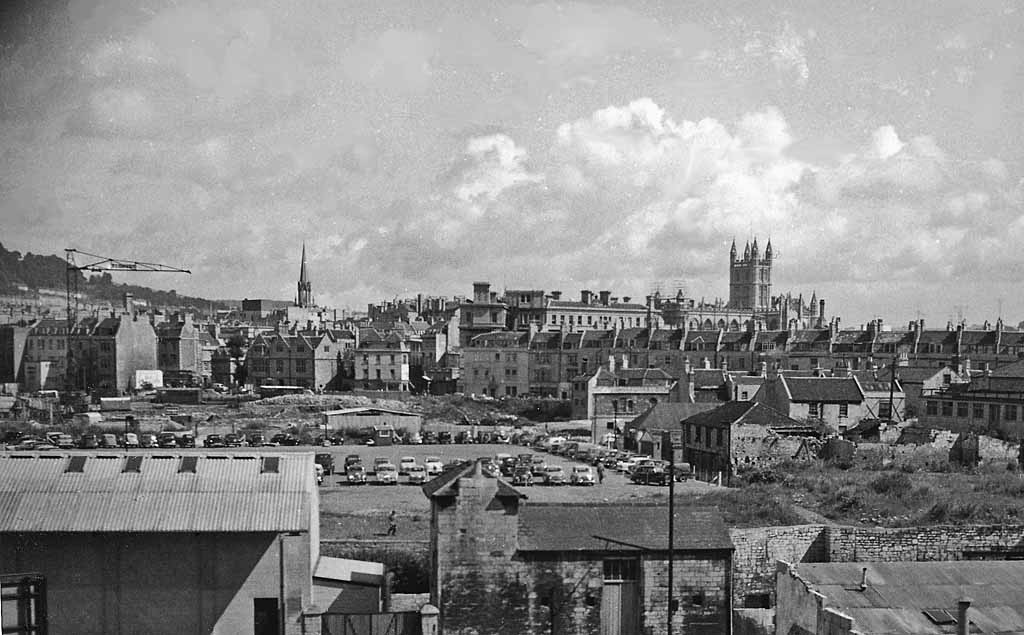
City centre in 1958, still with signs of the Bath Blitz

- 1944 – March–November: John Betjeman is assigned to a wartime job working on publicity for the Admiralty at the requisitioned Empire Hotel.
- 1945 – Town planner Patrick Abercrombie produces A Plan for Bath for post-war reconstruction.
- 1946 – October: City of Bath Bach Choir founded.
- 1948
  - Bath Assembly (music festival) begins.
  - Queen Square is given to the citizens of Bath in memory of those killed in the Blitz.
- 1951
  - George Perry-Smith opens the innovative Hole in the Wall restaurant.
  - July–August: John Straffen strangles two young girls.
- 1955
  - Bath Terraces Scheme introduced to conserve the city's historic architecture.
  - Covered reservoir opens on Bathampton Down.
- 1958 – Bus station opened in Manvers Street.
- 1960 – December: Major floods.
- 1961 – Bath Crematorium opens.
- 1963
  - 23 May: Assembly Rooms reopen after post-war reconstruction incorporating the Museum of Costume.
  - 10 June: The Beatles play the Pavilion.
- 1965–Easter 1983 – Excavations of Roman Baths under the direction of Barry Cunliffe, including areas beneath the Grand Pump Room and in the sacred spring.
- 1965 – Town planner Colin Buchanan publishes Bath: a planning and transport study.
- 1966
  - 7 March: Bath Green Park railway station and Somerset and Dorset Railway close with effect from this date.
  - November: University of Bath chartered, work having started on its Claverton Down site in 1964.
  - Churchill Bridge replaces Old Bridge over the Avon.
  - Electricity generating station ceases operation.
- 1969–1972 – Original Southgate Shopping Centre built to the design of Owen Luder.
- 1969 – J. B. Bowler, engineer and carbonated drink manufacturer, ceases business.
- 1970
  - 16 May: Reopening of Widcombe bottom lock as part of the restoration of the Kennet and Avon Canal.
  - June: Bath Festival of Blues and Progressive Music held.
  - 20 June: No. 1 Royal Crescent opened to the public as an historic house museum by Bath Preservation Trust after a two-year restoration.
  - 23–29 September: Adam Fergusson's essay criticising inappropriate development, "The Sack of Bath", is published in The Times newspaper by the editor William Rees-Mogg; it is subsequently expanded into a book with photographs by Snowdon and verses by John Betjeman.
- 1971
  - 25 April: Population: 84,670.
  - New semicircular Pulteney Weir in the Avon, designed by Neville Conder is completed.
  - Bath gasworks ceases production.
- 1973 – 30 March: Beaufort Hotel (later Hilton Bath City Hotel) opens in Walcot Street.
- 1974
  - 1 April: Bath becomes part of Avon non-metropolitan county under terms of the Local Government Act 1972.
  - 9 December: Irish Republican Army bomb exploded in The Corridor.
- 1975
  - Bath College of Higher Education established.
  - Herman Miller furniture factory built by Farrell/Grimshaw Partnership.
- 1978 – Spa baths closed due to contamination.
- 1979
  - 27 April: Bath Postal Museum opens in Great Pulteney Street.
  - Roper Rhodes bathroom accessories business launched.
- 1981 – Bath Fringe Festival and Bath Half Marathon begin.
- 1986
  - 26 July: Major fire at The Colonnades, Bath Street.
  - Bristol and Bath Railway Path laid out.
- 1987
  - 22 May: GWR FM Bath launches as an independent local radio station.
  - December: City of Bath inscribed as a World Heritage Site.
- 1989 – 11 January: Closure of Stothert & Pitt is announced.
- 1991
  - 21 April: Population: 78,689.
  - Summer: Major fire at Prior Park.
- 1993
  - April: Museum of East Asian Art opens.
  - May: Bath Royal Literary and Scientific Institution relaunched at its Queen Square premises; new public library opened in the Podium.
- 1995 – Bath Literature Festival begins.
- 1996 – 1 April: City becomes part of the Bath and North East Somerset non-metropolitan district. Charter Trustees of the City of Bath established.
- 1997 – Ustinov Studio (theatre) built.
- 1999 – 15 November: Bath FM launches as an independent local radio station, broadcasting until 24 March 2010.

== 2000s ==
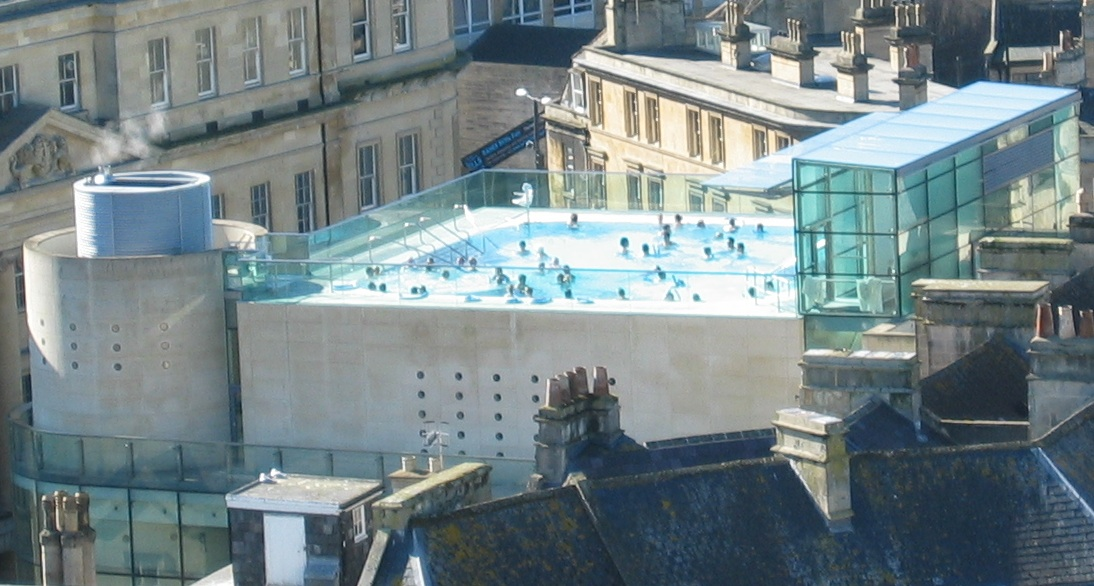
Thermae Bath Spa

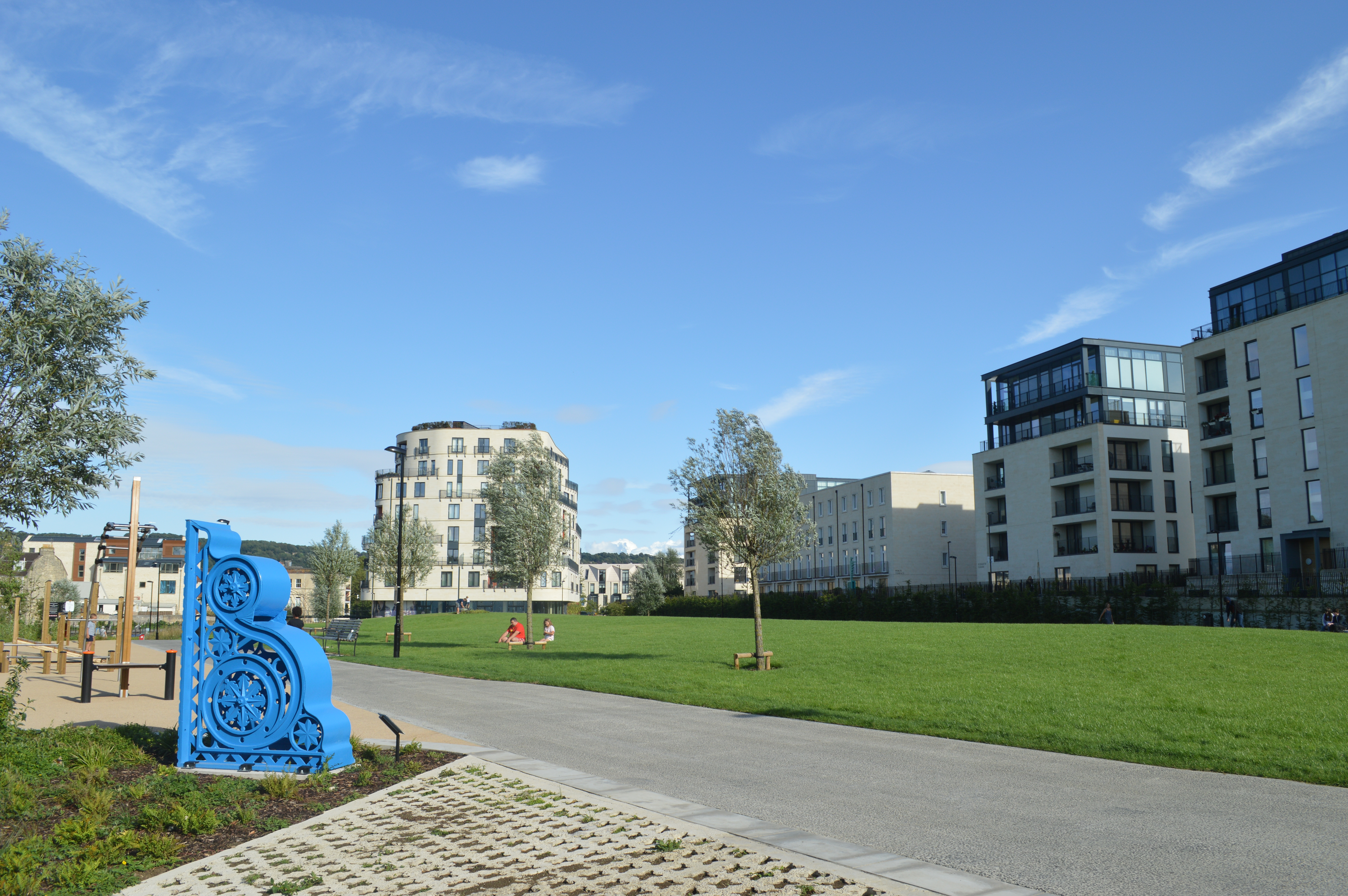
Elizabeth Park in the Bath Western Riverside residential development, opened in 2019

- 2000 – New Wessex Water headquarters on Claverton Down built to the design of Bennetts Associates.
- 2001 – April: city population recorded by the census is 83,992.
- 2002 – Bath Times newspaper begins publication as a free weekly; it ceases publication by 2007.
- 2005
  - August: Bath Spa University gains full university status.
  - October: The Egg theatre opens.
- 2006 – 7 August: Thermae Bath Spa facility opens.
- 2007
  - September: Bath Festival of Children's Literature begins.
  - October: Bath Chronicle changes from daily to weekly publication.
- 2008 – Beau Street Hoard found.
- 2009 – Bath bus station and SouthGate shopping centre open.
- 2011
  - April: city population recorded by the census is 88,859.
  - October: Occupy Bath begins.
  - Construction of Bath Western Riverside residential development on former Stothert & Pitt crane factory site begins.
- 2015
  - 9 February: A child and three adults are killed and four others seriously injured when a poorly maintained tipper truck runs away down Lansdown Lane into Weston.
  - April: City of Bath College renamed Bath College.
- 2019 – The Royal National Hospital for Rheumatic Diseases leaves its 1742 building in the city centre, for a newly completed building on the Royal United Hospital site
- 2021 – March: Clean Air Zone introduced in central Bath.

== Births ==
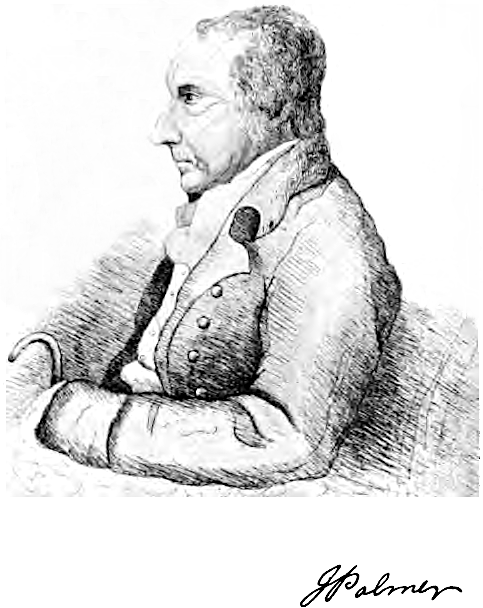
John Palmer (postal innovator) at age 75

- c.953 – Ælfheah of Canterbury, archbishop (d. 1012)
- c.1080 – Adelard of Bath, natural philosopher (d. c.1152)
- 1704 – John Wood, the elder, architect (d. 1754)
- 1707 – Benjamin Robins, military engineer (d. 1751)
- 1728 – 25 February: John Wood, the younger, architect (d. 1782)
- 1732 – David Hartley, the younger, statesman and inventor (d. 1813)
- c.1738 – John Palmer, architect (d. 1817)
- 1742 – John Palmer, postal innovator and theatre owner (d. 1818)
- 1744 – 31 May: Richard Lovell Edgeworth, politician, writer and inventor (d. 1817)
- 1751 – Honora Sneyd, educationalist (d. 1780)
- 1754 – September: Elizabeth Ann Linley, soprano (d. 1792)
- 1771 – Frances Brett Hodgkinson, actress in the United States (d. 1803)
- 1773 – 14 January: William Amherst, 1st Earl Amherst, diplomat and Governor-General of India (d. 1857)
- 1780
  - 3 June: William Hone, libertarian writer, satirist and bookseller (d. 1842)
  - Approximate date: Daniel Terry, actor and playwright (d. 1829)
- 1790 – 19 December: William Parry, Arctic explorer (d. 1855)
- 1792 – prob: Paul Bedford, comedian (d. 1871)
- 1794
  - 9 September: William Lonsdale, geologist (d. 1871)
  - James Dredge, the elder, civil engineer and brewer (d. 1863)
- 1796 – John Pinch the Younger, architect (d. 1849)
- 1807 – Robert Montgomery, poet (d. 1855)
- 1808 – 15 July: Henry Cole, civil servant and inventor (d. 1882)
- 1810 – 2 April: Edward Vansittart Neale, Christian socialist (d. 1892)
- 1816 – 17 March: Abraham Marchant, Mormon leader (d. 1881)
- 1820 – 22 June: Charles Lowder, Anglo-Catholic priest (d. 1880)
- 1835 – 2 April: William Eden Nesfield, domestic revival architect (d. 1888)
- 1840 – 29 July: James Dredge, the younger, civil engineering journalist (d. 1906)
- 1846 – 26 October: C. P. Scott, newspaper editor (d. 1932)
- 1872 – Edith Garrud, née Williams, pioneer martial artist and suffragist (died 1971)
- 1880 – 28 October: Thomas Ley, politician in Australia and murderer (d. 1947)
- 1881 – 7 July: Sidney Horstmann, engineer and businessman (d. 1962)
- 1888 – 15 June: Martin D'Arcy, Catholic intellectual (d. 1976)
- 1896 – 7 January: Arnold Ridley, playwright and actor (d. 1984)
- 1898 – 17 June: Harry Patch, supercentenarian and last surviving combat soldier of World War I (d. 2009)
- 1901 – 29 September: Caryll Houselander, Catholic lay mystic (d. 1954)
- 1903 – 17 October: G. E. Trevelyan, novelist (d. 1941)
- 1908 – 27 March: Alberto Semprini, conductor (d. 1990)
- 1935 – 24 March: Mary Berry, food writer and presenter
- 1943 – 3 April: Jonathan Lynn, stage and screen director, producer, writer and actor
- 1945 – 17 December: Jacqueline Wilson, née Aitken, children's fiction writer
- 1947 – 4 October: Ann Widdecombe, politician (d. 2026)
- 1964
  - 24 February: Bill Bailey, comedian and musician
  - John Douglas Thompson, actor in the United States
- 1973
  - 11 April: Kris Marshall, actor
  - 14 May: Indira Varma, actress
- 1974 – 18 January: Princess Claire of Belgium, née Coombs, princess consort

== See also ==
- History of Bath, Somerset
- Timeline of Somerset history
- Timelines of other cities in South West England: Bristol, Exeter, Plymouth

== Bibliography ==
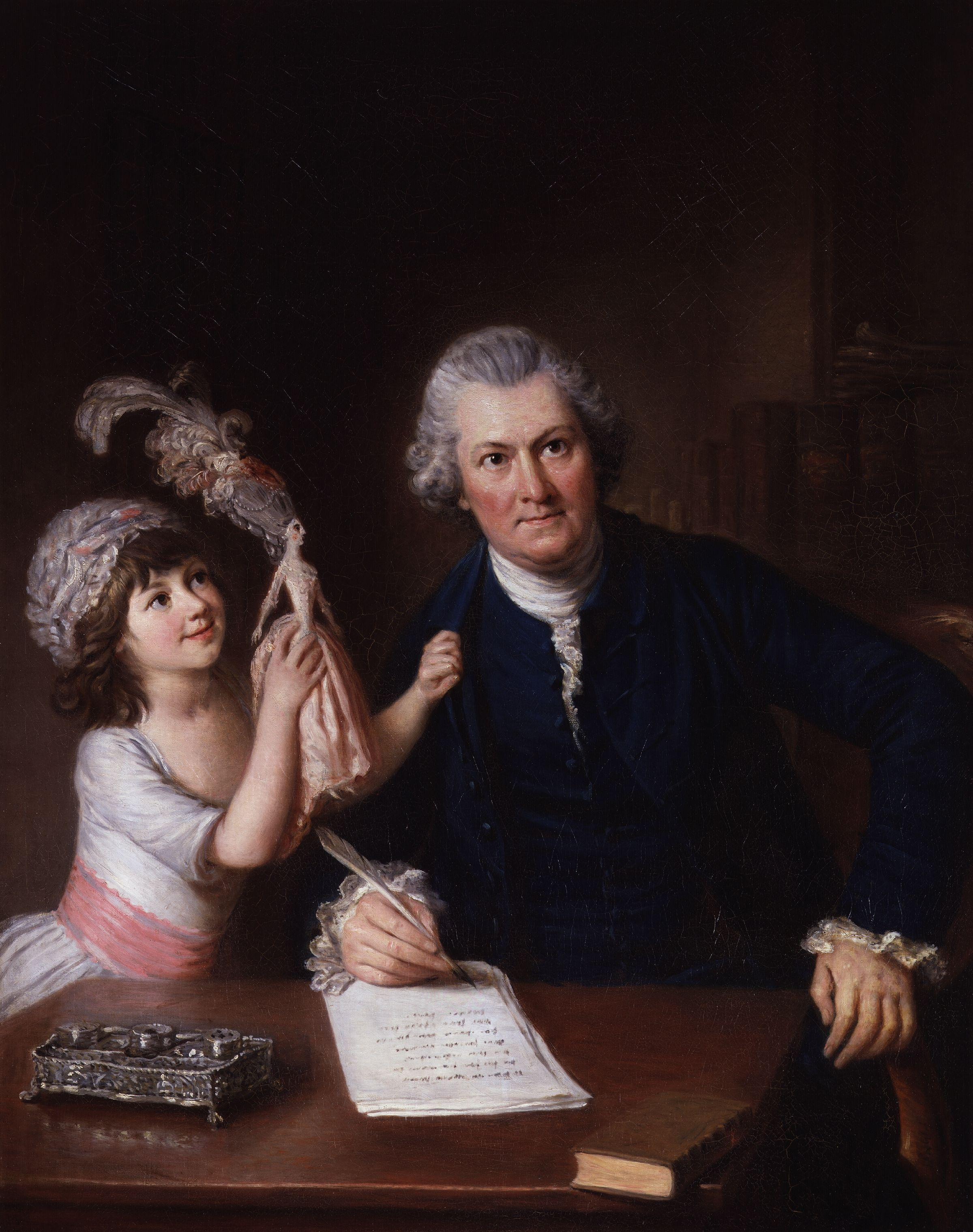
Christopher Anstey, author of The New Bath Guide, with his daughter, painted by Bath resident artist William Hoare c.1777

=== Published in 18th century ===
- New Bath Guide, or, Useful Pocket-Companion. Bath: Printed by C. Pope, for W. Taylor. c. 1765.
  - New Bath Guide, or, Useful Pocket-Companion (New ed.). Bath: Printed by R. Cruttwell for W. Taylor. 1789. hdl:2027/hvd.hxjnl3.
- Christopher Anstey (1766). New Bath Guide: or, Memoirs of the Blunderhead Family (3rd ed.). London: J. Dodsley. OL 16314966M.
- Daniel Defoe; Samuel Richardson (1778). "Bath". A Tour Through the Island of Great Britain (8th ed.). London: J.F. and C. Rivington.
- Philip Thicknesse (1778). New Prose Bath Guide, for the Year 1778. London: Printed for the author. OL 23412268M.
- John Collinson (1791). "Bath". History and Antiquities of the County of Somerset. Vol. 1. Bath: Printed by R. Cruttwell.
- New Bath Directory, for the Year, 1792. Bath: W. Gye. 1792.
- Archibald Robertson (1792). "Modern Bath". Topographical Survey of the Great Road from London to Bath and Bristol. London. OCLC 1633468.

=== Published in 19th century ===
==== 1800s–1840s ====
- Richard Warner (1801). History of Bath. Bath. OCLC 5837002.
- John Claude Nattes (1806). Bath, illustrated by a series of views. London: W. Miller and W. Sheppard. OCLC 32851779.
- Joseph Nightingale (1813). "Bath". Beauties of England and Wales. Vol. 13. London: J. Harris.
- Historic and Local New Bath Guide (4th ed.). Bath: C. Duffield. c. 1815.
- Pierce Egan (1819). Walks Through Bath. Bath: Meyler and Son. OL 7233349M.
- James Dugdale (1819). "Somersetshire: Bath". New British Traveller. Vol. 4. London: J. Robins and Co.
- Gye's Bath Directory. Bath: W. Gye. 1819.
- Robert Watt (1824). "Bath". Bibliotheca Britannica. Vol. 3. Edinburgh: A. Constable. hdl:2027/nyp.33433089888832. OCLC 961753.
- David Brewster, ed. (1830). "Bath". Edinburgh Encyclopædia. Edinburgh: William Blackwood.
- "Bath". Great Western Railway Guide. London: James Wyld. 1839. OCLC 12922212.
- Thomas Bartlett (1841). "Bath". New Tablet of Memory; or, Chronicle of Remarkable Events. London: Thomas Kelly.
- "Bath". Mogg's Great Western Railway and Windsor, Bath, and Bristol Guide. London: Edward Mogg. 1841.
- And Co, Hunt E. (1848). Hunt & Co.'s Directory & Court Guide for the Cities of Bath, Bristol, & Wells.

==== 1850s–1890s ====
- "Bath". Bradshaw's Descriptive Railway Hand-Book of Great Britain and Ireland. London: W.J. Adams. 1860.
- John Earle (1864). A guide to the knowledge of Bath, ancient and modern. Longman, Green, Longman, Roberts, and Green.
- "Bath (Somerset)". Where Shall We Go?: A Guide to the Healthiest and Most Beautiful Watering Places in the British Islands (4th ed.). Edinburgh: A. and C. Black. 1866.
- William Henry Overall, ed. (1870). "Bath, Somerset". Dictionary of Chronology. London: William Tegg. OCLC 2613202.
- Smith, George; Thackeray, William Makepeace (July 1873). "Some Literary Ramblings about Bath: III". Cornhill Magazine. Vol. 28.
- James Tunstall (1876). Rambles about Bath and its neighbourhood (6th ed.). London: Simpkin, Marshall, and Co. OCLC 12987741. OL 6919886M.
- John Parker Anderson (1881). "Somersetshire: Bath". Book of British Topography: a Classified Catalogue of the Topographical Works in the Library of the British Museum Relating to Great Britain and Ireland. London: W. Satchell.
- R. E. M. Peach (1883–1884). Historic houses in Bath, and their associations. Vol. 2. London: Simpkin, Marshall, & Co. OCLC 5463468. OL 7096295M. Archived.
- Concise Guide to Bath. Bath: R.B. Cater. 1885.
- R. E. M. Peach (1888). Bath, Old and New. London: Simpkin, Marshall & Company.
- British Association for the Advancement of Science (1888). J. W. Morris (ed.). Handbook to Bath. Bath: I. Pitman and Sons. OL 19530108M.
- J. G. Douglas Kerr (1898). Popular Guide to the Use of the Bath Waters (12th ed.). Bath Herald. OL 14035086M.
- Bijou Guide to Bath. Bath: Tylee & Co. 1890. OCLC 12987828. OL 19368029M.
- Charles Gross (1897). "Bath". Bibliography of British Municipal History. New York: Longmans, Green, and Co.

=== Published in 20th century ===
- Emanuel Green (1902). Bibliotheca Somersetensis. Vol. 1: Bath Books. Taunton: Barnicott and Pearce. OCLC 7080200.
- G. K. Fortescue, ed. (1902). "Bath". Subject Index of the Modern Works Added to the Library of the British Museum in the Years 1881–1900. London: The Trustees.
- William Tyte (1903). Bath in the Eighteenth Century. Bath: Chronicle Office.
- Robert Donald, ed. (1908). "Bath". Municipal Year Book of the United Kingdom for 1908. London: Edward Lloyd. hdl:2027/nyp.33433081995593.
- Bryan Little (1947). The Building of Bath 47-1947: an architectural and social study. London: Collins.
- Walter Ison (1948). The Georgian Buildings of Bath from 1700 to 1830. London: Faber.
- Benjamin Boyce (1967). The benevolent man: a life of Ralph Allen of Bath. Cambridge, Mass.: Harvard University Press.
- "Bath in the Eighteenth Century". Apollo. London. November 1973.
- Peter Coard (1973). Vanishing Bath: buildings threatened and destroyed (3rd ed.). Bath: Kingsmead Press. ISBN 0-901571-67-9.
- Adam Fergusson (1973). The Sack of Bath: a record and an indictment. Salisbury: Compton Russell. ISBN 978-0-85955-002-4.
  - Adam Fergusson; Tim Mowl (1989). The Sack of Bath and after. Salisbury: Compton Russell. ISBN 0-85955-161-X.
- Charles Robertson (1975). Bath: an architectural guide. London: Faber. ISBN 0-571-10750-8.
- Kenneth Hudson (1977). Pleasures and People of Bath. Folio Miniatures. London: Michael Joseph. ISBN 978-0-718-11588-3.
- Larry R. Ford (1978). "Continuity and Change in Historic Cities: Bath, Chester, and Norwich". Geographical Review. 68 (3): 253–273. Bibcode:1978GeoRv..68..253F. doi:10.2307/215046. JSTOR 215046.
- Bryan Little (1980). Bath Portrait: The Story of Bath, its Life and its Buildings (4th ed.). Bristol: Burleigh Press. ISBN 0-902780-06-9.
- R. S. Neale (1981). Bath 1680-1850: a social history. London: Routledge & Kegan Paul. ISBN 978-0-7100-0639-4.
- Christopher Pound (1981). Genius of Bath: the city and its landscape. Bath: Millstream. ISBN 978-0-948975-01-1.
- Barry Cunliffe; Peter Davenport, eds. (1985). The Temple of Sulis Minerva at Bath. Monograph 7. Vol. 1: The site. Oxford University Committee for Archaeology. ISBN 0-947816-07-0.
- Barry Cunliffe (1986). The City of Bath. Gloucester: Alan Sutton. ISBN 0-86299-297-4.
- Tim Mowl; Brian Earnshaw (1988). John Wood: architect of obsession. Bath: Millstream Books. ISBN 978-0-948975-13-4.
- Peter Davenport, ed. (1989). Archaeology in Bath 1976–1985. Monograph 28. Oxford University Committee for Archaeology. ISBN 0-947816-28-3.
- G. A. Kellaway, ed. (1991). Hot Springs of Bath. Bath City Council. ISBN 978-0-901303-25-7.
- Peter Davenport (1999). Archaeology in Bath: excavations 1984–1989. BAR British series 284. Oxford: Archaeopress. ISBN 1-84171-007-5.
- Peter Borsay (2000). Image of Georgian Bath, 1700–2000. Oxford University Press. ISBN 0-19-820265-2.
- Barry Cunliffe (2000). Roman Bath Discovered (3rd ed.). Stroud: Tempus. ISBN 0-7524-1902-1.

=== Published in 21st century ===
- Peter Davenport (2002). Medieval Bath uncovered. Stroud: Tempus. ISBN 0-7524-1965-X.
- Michael Forsyth (2003). Bath. Pevsner Architectural Guides. New Haven: Yale University Press. ISBN 978-0-300-10177-5.
- John Wroughton (2004). Stuart Bath: Life in the forgotten city, 1603–1714. Bath: Lansdown Press. ISBN 0-9520249-5-0.
- Peter Borsay (2006). "Myth, Memory, and Place: Monmouth and Bath 1750–1900". Journal of Social History. 39 (3): 867–889. doi:10.1353/jsh.2006.0001. JSTOR 3790298. S2CID 144152506.
- John Wroughton (2006). Tudor Bath: Life and strife in the little city, 1485–1603. Bath: Lansdown Press. ISBN 0-9520249-6-9.
- Peter Wallis, ed. (2008). Innovation and discovery: Bath and the rise of science. Bath Royal Literary and Scientific Institution; William Herschel Society. ISBN 978-0-948975-82-0.
- Cathryn Spence (2010). Bath – City on Show. Brimscombe Port: The History Press. ISBN 978-0-7524-5674-4.
- Dan Brown & Cathryn Spence (2012). Bath in the Blitz: Then & Now in colour. Brimscombe Port: The History Press. ISBN 978-0-7524-6639-2.
- Roger Rolls (2012). Douched and Doctored: thermal springs, spa doctors and rheumatic diseases. London Publishing Partnership. ISBN 978-1-907994-09-8.
- Cathryn Spence (2012). Water, History & Style – Bath: World Heritage Site. Brimscombe Port: The History Press. ISBN 978-0-7524-8814-1.
- Mike Jenner (2013). The Classical Buildings of Bath. Bristol: Redcliffe. ISBN 978-1-908326-03-4.
