= Cheap Street =

Cheap Street may refer to:

- Cheap Street, Bath, a historic street in Bath, England
- Cheap Street, Frome, a historic street in Frome, England
- Cheap Street Press, a defunct American publishing company
