= List of Bath City Architects =

The prominent post of Bath City Architect was bestowed by the Corporation of Bath, England, on an architect who would be repeatedly chosen for civic projects. It is a form of council architect.

- Thomas Warr Attwood (unofficially) c.1733–1775
- Thomas Baldwin 1780–1792
- John Palmer 1792–1817
- John Lowder 1817–1823
- George Phillips Manners 1823–1862
- Charles Edward Davis 1862–1902

== See also ==
- Bath City Surveyor
- List of British architects
