= Thomas Warr Attwood =

English builder, architect and local politician in Bath

Thomas Warr Attwood (c.1733 – 15 November 1775) was an English builder, architect and local politician in Bath.

== Life ==
He was a member of a prominent local family and a member of the city Council from 1760. Although he held no formal appointment, he acted as city surveyor and architect. He was able to use his position to obtain contracts and building concessions on council-owned land — indeed, he was Mayor of Bath in 1769 when the council adopted his proposal to build a new gaol, and this caused controversy in the city.

Much of the controversy surrounding him is justified since he was a plumber, but because of his political connections he was routinely appointed as the architect, surveyor, and city planner for all of the Corporation of Bath's civic projects, including the new gaol, which he designed and built between 1772 and 1774. All of his designs were almost certainly executed by his assistants, but he received both the credit, payment, and future commissions at a time when late 18th-century Bath was host and birthplace to some of the greatest architects in the kingdom.

== Death ==
He was killed 15 November 1775 by violent contusions he received in his headduring the collapse of a derelict building which he was inspecting on the site of the proposed new Guildhall. His assistant Thomas Baldwin was appointed City Architect and City Surveyor.

Attwood's pedestal monument is in the churchyard at Weston. South of the church of All Saints, Weston, it was designed by Baldwin and features an example of 18th-century cast-iron railings.

== List of works ==
- Paragon Crescent (1768)
- Oxford Row (1773)
- The New Gaol, Bathwick (1772–3)
- Guildhall (His name was on the original designs but like the rest of his work, Baldwin and other assistants were responsible for them. As soon as he died, Baldwin was selected as the architect of the Guildhall with no noticeable change to "Attwood's design," mainly because it had always been Baldwin's.)

Preceded by ?	Bath City Architect ?–1775	Succeeded by Thomas Baldwin

Preceded by ?	Bath City Surveyor ?–1775	Succeeded by Thomas Baldwin
