= John Lowder =

John Lowder was a gentleman architect and surveyor working in Bath, Somerset, England in the late 18th and early 19th centuries. He was the Bath City Surveyor from 1817 to 1823.

As a banker, Lowder was associated with some of the building work in late-18th-century Bath. With the builder Charles Spackman, he purchased an acre of ground in August 1785 called the Crannells off Lansdown Hill, on which they were to build No.1 Lansdown Crescent in 1789.

In Bath, Lowder designed the Commissioners' church of Holy Trinity, James Street (1819–1822) in the classical style but it was constructed in a Gothic style. Declared redundant after being severely damaged by bombing in 1942, the structure was demolished in 1957 and its congregation moved to a neighbouring church, which has subsequently been renamed Holy Trinity, Queens Square.

== List of works ==
- Rectory, now Bishopstone House, Bishopstone near Salisbury, 1812–1819
- The National School, Bath, 1816–1818 (demolished in the late 1960s)
- Holy Trinity, James Street, 1819–1822 (demolished in the late 1950s)

== Footnotes ==
Preceded by John Palmer	Bath City Surveyor; 1823–1862	Succeeded by George Phillip Manners
