= Thomas Baldwin (architect) =

English architect

Thomas Baldwin (c.1750 – 7 March 1820) was an English architect in the city of Bath, who was responsible for designing some of Bath's principal Georgian buildings.

In 1775, he was appointed as the official Bath City Architect. In this role he designed Guildhall, Argyle Street, Laura Place, Great Pulteney Street and many others. In 1793, he was dismissed for financial irregularities, and as a result he was forced into bankruptcy and his reputation was ruined. Jane Root, biographer of Baldwin, writes; "he had a history not merely of imprudence, but of deliberate dishonesty".

== Career ==
Baldwin was born in 1749 or 1750. His place of birth is not recorded, however, he was not native to Bath. He was first recorded in the city of Bath in 1774. He was initially a clerk (later builder and assistant) to plumber, glazier, and politician Thomas Warr Attwood. By 1775, he was appointed as the Bath City Architect after Attwood's death. During the construction of the Guildhall he was officially appointed the position of Bath City Surveyor. He was surveyor to the Pulteney Estate and planned the development of Bathwick as well as being responsible for much of the building. Around the same time he was appointed to the Office of Architect and Surveyor for the Improvement Commissioners, formed by the Bath Improvement Act 1789 (29 Geo. 3. c. 73), on 9 April 1790 (at a salary of £200 per annum), which he held until 1793.

Baldwin married Elizabeth Chapman in St James' Church, Bath on 15 September 1779, which was designed by John Palmer of Bath between 1768 and 1769. Palmer was the man who would later investigate Baldwin and replace him. The Chapmans were a local political family, and a month after his marriage he was appointed Deputy Chamberlain to the Corporation of Bath. He was again appointed to this post on 7 January 1782, and again on 6 October 1783. His salary for this post, as recorded in October 1790 was 210 pounds per annum.

== Bankruptcy ==
Between 1790 and 1792 Baldwin refused to provide financial accounts to The Improvement Commissioners and the Corporation of Bath. By 17 May 1793, a committee was formed by the Improvement Commissioners to investigate Baldwin and he was dismissed on 28 June 1793. This was followed by dismissal from his other positions for financial irregularities. He was arrested for failing to provide accounts on 26 July 1793. On 29 July of that year he was freed by a judge.

A creditor named Edmunds commenced bankruptcy procedures against him on 15 August 1793. Baldwin didn't contest the bankruptcy and his estate was sold on 16 January 1794. In 1802, The Corporation of Bath discharged him from bankruptcy and he was allowed to relaunch his career.

Baldwin historian Jane Root, writes "he had a history not merely of imprudence, but of deliberate dishonesty." She writes that the late 18th century saw a country wide speculative boom in town building and personal bankruptcies. With Baldwin one of the lucky few to be allowed to practice again.

== Death ==
He died at age 70 in his Great Pulteney Street terrace house home, which he had designed. He was buried at St. Michael's, Bath on 14 March 1820.

== Legacy ==
He was one of the leading architects of Georgian Bath, designing some of its principal buildings, mainly in a Palladian style, with Adamesque detailing.

=== List of works ===
- The Guildhall, Bath (1775–1779)
- "So-called" Kitchen of King's Bath Repair, Bath (1777, demolished four years later for his re-imagined scheme)
- Northumberland Buildings, Bath (1778–1780)
- New King's Bath Pavilion, Bath (1781, demolished in the 19th century)
- The original (now only east facade) of The Cross Bath, Bath 1784
- The Old Pump Room, Bath (1783–1784)
- Colonnade, Old Pump Room, Bath (1786)
- Hafod House, Cardiganshire (1786–1788)
- The New Private Baths, Bath (1788–1789)
- Sydney Place and Bathwick Street, Bathwick (1788–1792)
- Argyle Buildings, Bath (1789)
- Laura Place, Bath (1789)
- Great Pulteney Street, Bathwick (1789)
- Northampton Street, Bath (1791–1805), continued by John Pinch the elder and George Phillips Manners
- Union Street, Bath (1790)
- Cheap Street refronted, Bath (1790)
- Stall Street refronted, Bath (1790)
- Bath Street, Bath (1791, originally named Cross Bath Street)
- Nash Street, Bath (from Bath Street to Westgate Street)
- Hot Bath Street, Bath
- Bow Street, Bath
- The Great Pump Room's Colonnade (12 March 1790 to Summer 1791)
- The Grand Pump Room, Bath (1790–1791), finished to John Palmer's designs by the latter (1794–1794)
- Union Street, Bath (Begun 3 June 1791 on "the ground in the Bear Yard" but not completed in 1793)
- 1–4 Henrietta Street Bath (c.1795)
- Sydney Hotel, Bathwick (1796–1797) – now Holburne Museum of Art, built to a modified design by Charles Harcourt Masters within Sydney Gardens
- Bathford Church, Somerset extensions (1803, 1817)
- Skaiteshill House, Chalford, Gloucestershire (c.1805)
- Town Hall, Devizes, Wiltshire (1806–1808)
- Hafod House, Cardiganshire, rebuilt after fire (1807)
- Chapel, Duchess of Somerset's Hospital, Froxfield, Wiltshire (1813 or 1814)
- Rainscombe House, Oare, Wiltshire, remodelled (1816)
- The house (now demolished) at Hafod Uchtryd

== Sources ==
- H.M. Colvin, A Biographical Dictionary of British Architects, 1600–1840 (1997) ISBN 0-300-07207-4
- Michael Forsyth, Bath, Pevsner Architectural Guides (2003) ISBN 0-300-10177-5
- Jane Root, "Thomas Baldwin: His Public Career in Bath, 1775–1793" (in, ed. Trevor Fawcett. Bath History, Volume V Bath: Millstream Books Publishing Limited, 1994), 80–103.
- "Baldwin, Thomas" . Dictionary of National Biography. London: Smith, Elder & Co. 1885–1900.

Preceded by Thomas Warr Attwood	Bath City Architect; 1775–1793	Succeeded by John Palmer

Preceded by Thomas Warr Attwood	Bath City Surveyor; 1775–1793	Succeeded by John Palmer

Preceded by Post created	Surveyor to the Pulteney Estate ?–Retained after 1793	Succeeded by John Pinch the elder
