= Bath City Surveyor =

The prominent post of Bath City Architect and Surveyor was bestowed by the Corporation of Bath, Somerset, England, on an architect who would be repeatedly chosen for civic projects. The posts were often bestowed separately with surveyor being the first appointment. Surveyors such as Lowder never shared the title with that of City Architect.

- Thomas Warr Attwood (unofficially) until 1775
- Thomas Baldwin 1776–1792
- John Palmer 1792–1817
- John Lowder 1817–1823
- George Phillips Manners 1823–1862

== See also ==
- Bath City Architect
