= Cheap Street, Bath =

Cheap Street
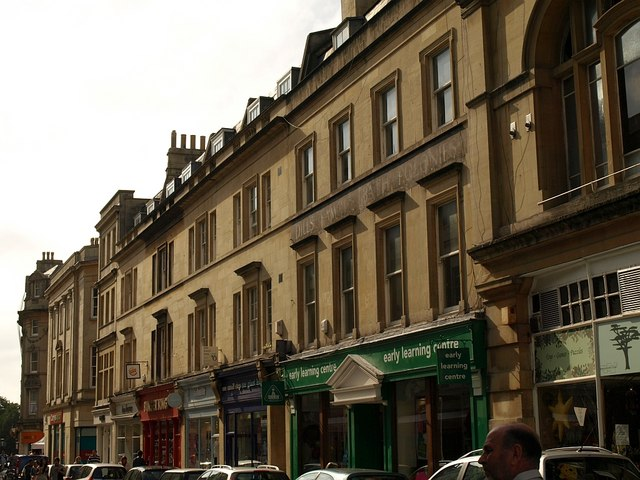

- Location within Somerset
- 51°22′54″N 2°21′35″W
- Location: Bath, Somerset, England

Listed Building – Grade I
- Official name: 14, Cheap Street
- Designated: 12 June 1950
- Reference no.: 1395620

Listed Building – Grade II*
- Official name: 13, Cheap Street
- Designated: 12 June 1950
- Reference no.: 1395619

Listed Building – Grade II
- Official name: 15-20, Cheap Street
- Designated: 12 June 1950
- Reference no.: 1395623

Listed Building – Grade II
- Official name: 21, Cheap Street
- Designated: 11 August 1972
- Reference no.: 1395664

Listed Building – Grade II
- Official name: 3-6 Cheap Street
- Designated: 20 December 2011
- Reference no.: 1406040

Listed Building – Grade II
- Official name: 7 and 8 Cheap Street
- Designated: 11 August 2011
- Reference no.: 1404113

Listed Building – Grade II
- Official name: 9-10 Cheap Street
- Designated: 20 December 2011
- Reference no.: 1406041

Cheap Street in Bath, Somerset, England is adjacent to Bath Abbey and contains several listed buildings.

The road was known as Souter Street (meaning Shoemakers Street) until 1398.

Number 13 adjoins the abbey and is Grade II* listed.

Number 14 was built around 1720. The central doorway is flanked on either side by pairs of windows with elliptical arches and Doric pilasters. There are also four Ionic pilasters and a central pediment on the 1st floor above the doorway and four Corinthian pilasters on the floor above that. It is adjacent to Marshal Wade's House in the Abbey Church Yard, and has been designated as a Grade I listed building.

Number 15 to 19 were built as a block, including shop fronts divided by Doric columns, by Thomas Baldwin around 1789.

Number 21 and The Roundhouse, which used to be known as the Abbey Wine Vaults, is a mid to late 19th century radiused round corner of Cheap Street and Stall Street.

== See also ==
- List of Grade I listed buildings in Bath and North East Somerset
