= Argyle Street, Bath =

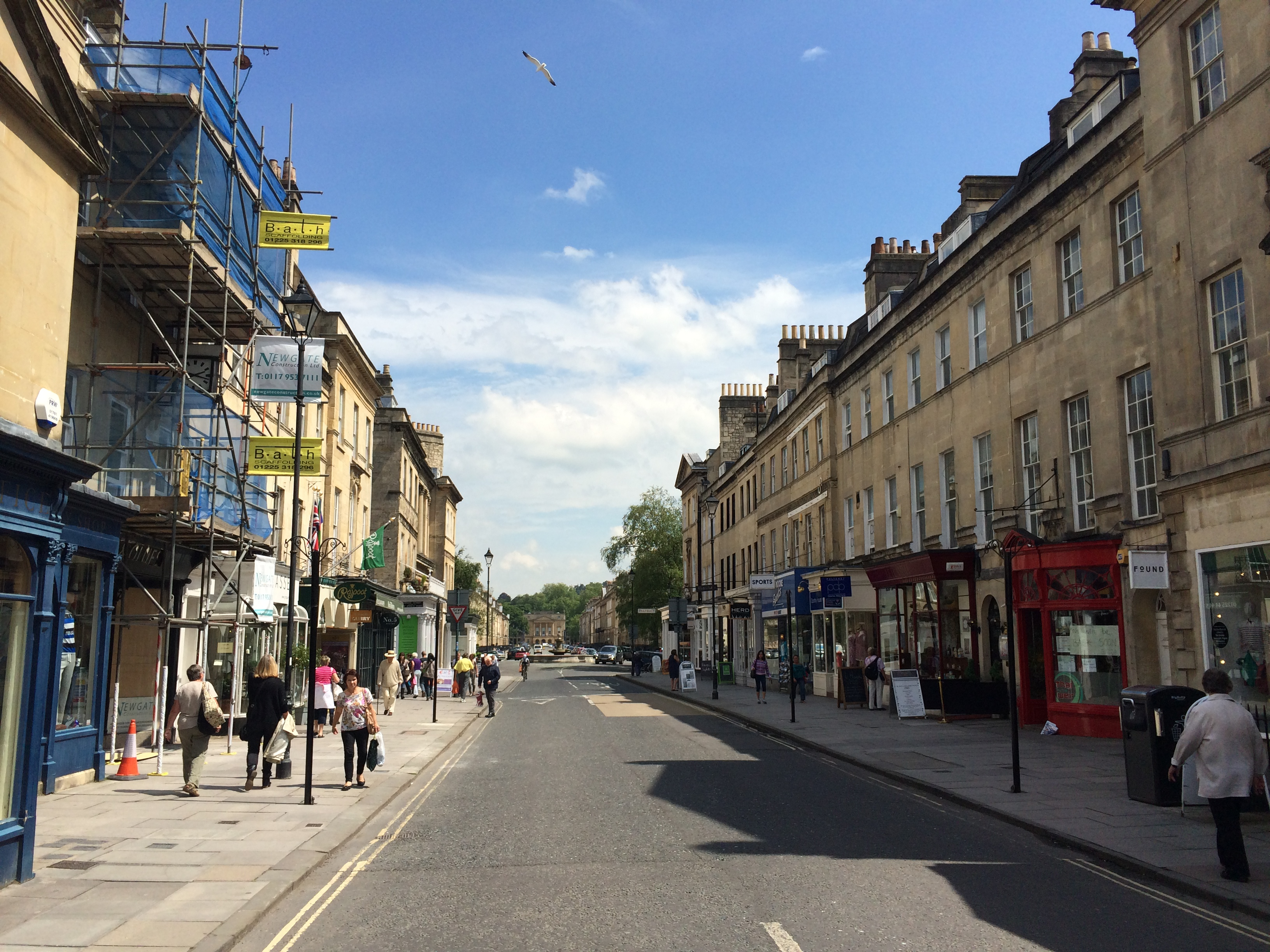
- View of Argyle Street, Bath looking east from Pulteney Bridge

- Location within Somerset
- 51°23′0″N 2°21′26″W
- Location: Bathwick, Bath, Somerset, England

History
- Built: circa 1789

Site notes
- Architect: Thomas Baldwin
- Architectural styles: Georgian, with some later shopfronts

Listed Building – Grade II
- Official name: Numbers 1 to 5
- Designated: 11 August 1972
- Reference no.: 1394146

Listed Building – Grade II
- Official name: Number 6
- Designated: 12 June 1950
- Reference no.: 1394147

Listed Building – Grade II
- Official name: Argyle Congregational Chapel
- Designated: 12 June 1950
- Reference no.: 1394150

Listed Building – Grade II
- Official name: Number 7
- Designated: 12 June 1950
- Reference no.: 1394148

Listed Building – Grade II*
- Official name: Numbers 8 to 17
- Designated: 12 June 1950
- Reference no.: 1394149

Argyle Street (formerly Argyle Buildings) is a historic street in the centre of Bath, England, located between Pulteney Bridge and Laura Place.

== History ==
As part of the Bathwick Estate, Argyle Street was designed by Thomas Baldwin for Sir William Pulteney. Construction of the street was completed around 1789. The buildings were intended to serve as residential townhouses like those immediately adjacent in Laura Place. However, over several decades shopfronts were added to form an extension to the shopping parade on Pulteney Bridge. As a result the street now has a fine selection of shopfronts with designs from several different architectural periods. Particularly noteworthy are the late Georgian shopfronts to numbers 8, 9, and 16, and Victorian shopfronts to numbers 6, 7, and 12.

The former Argyle Congregational Chapel is located on the north side of the street between numbers 6 and 7. It was used by a United Reformed Church congregation from 1890 to 2020. It closed during the COVID-19 pandemic, and was sold for development in 2023.

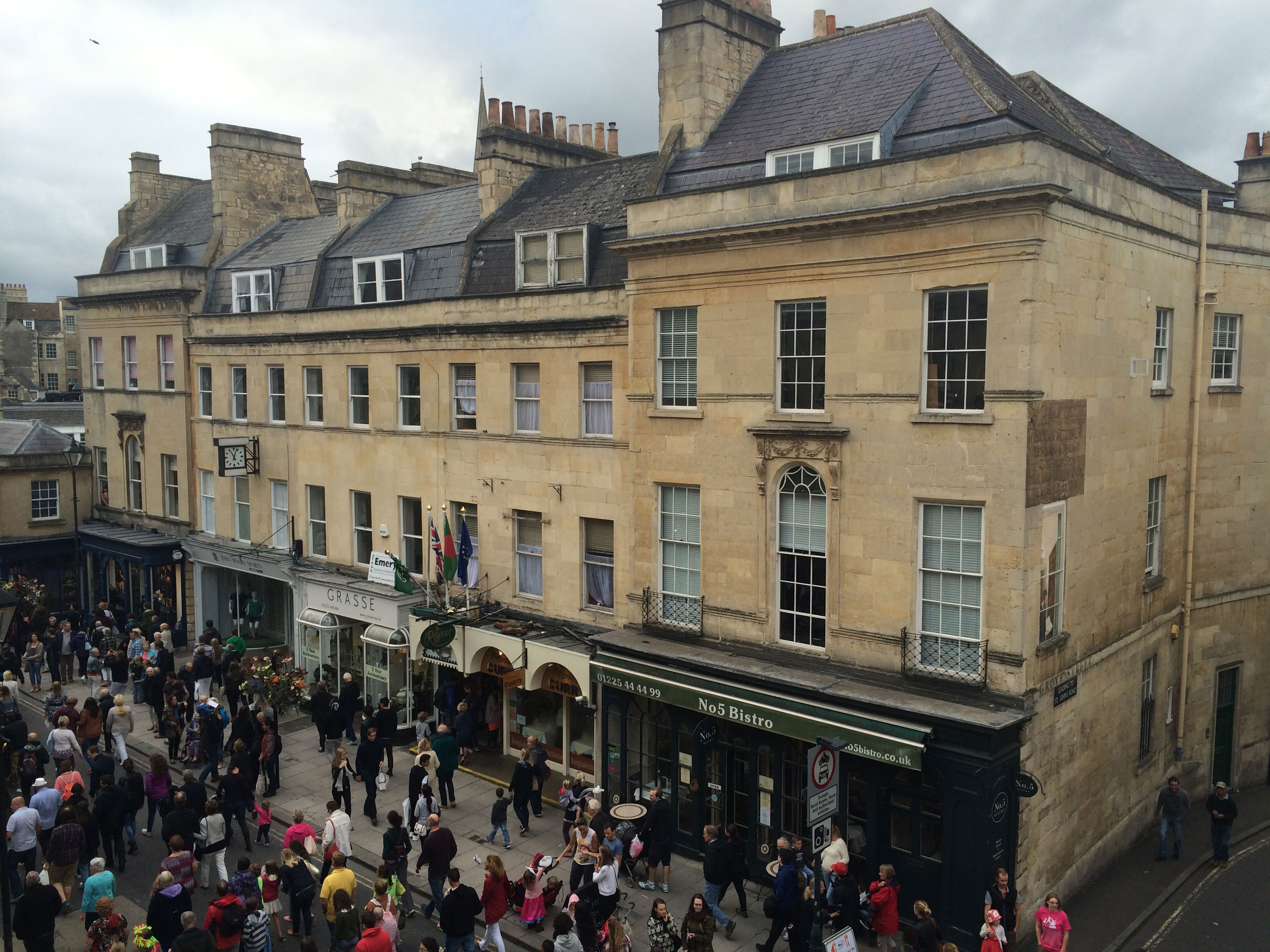
Numbers 1 - 5

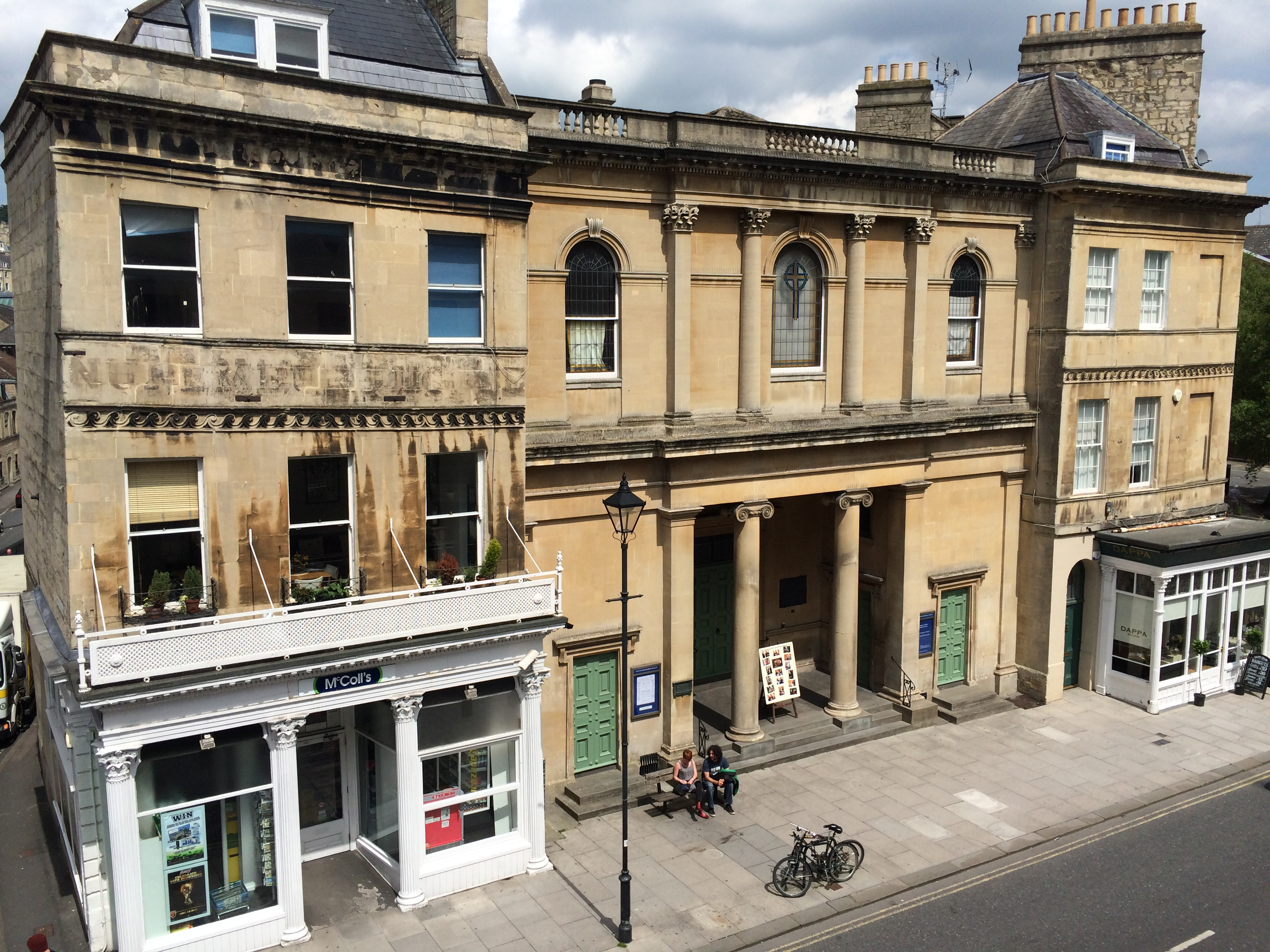
Argyle Congregational Chapel, flanked by Number 6 (left) and Number 7 (right)

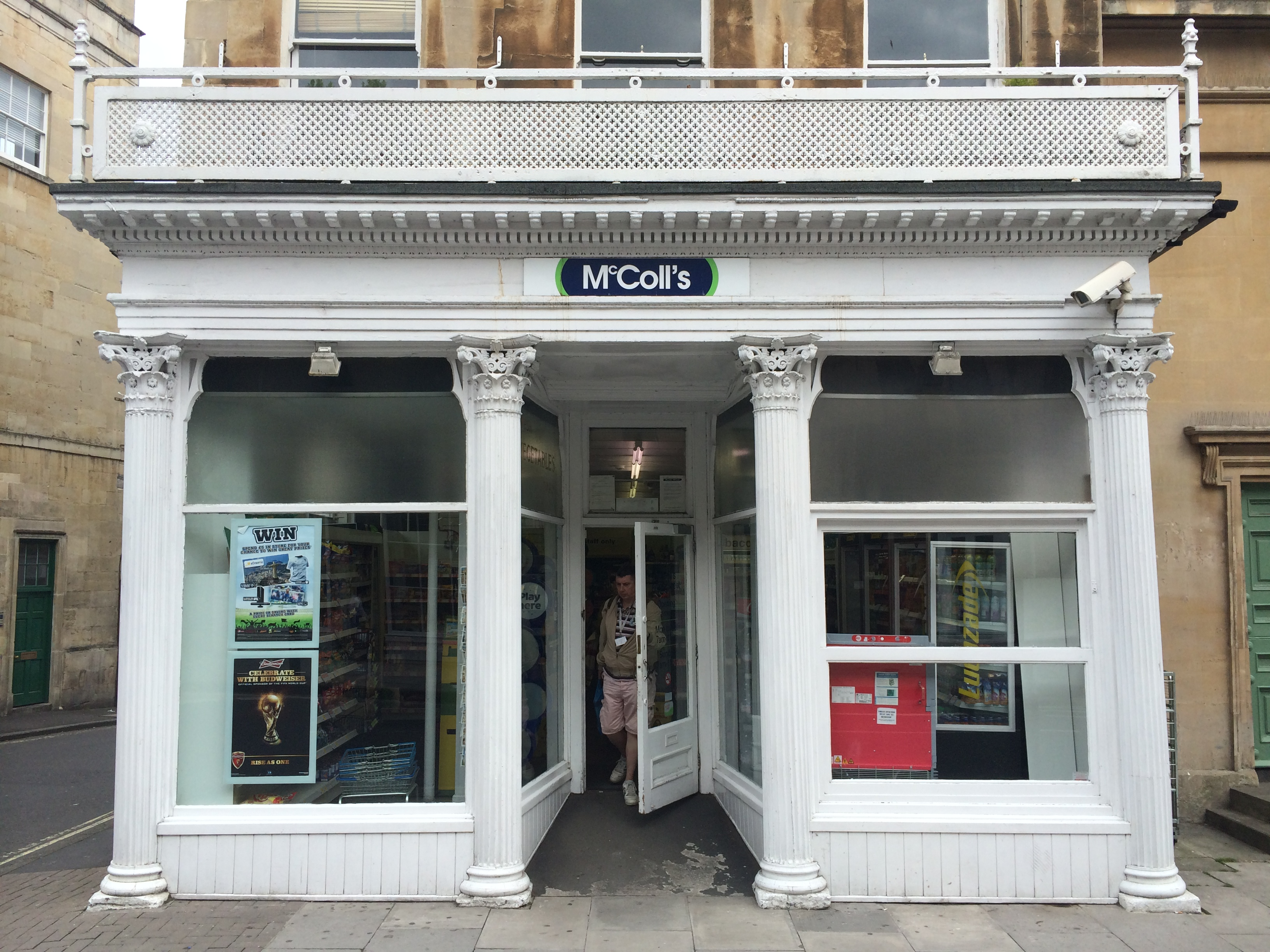
Victorian shopfront to Number 6

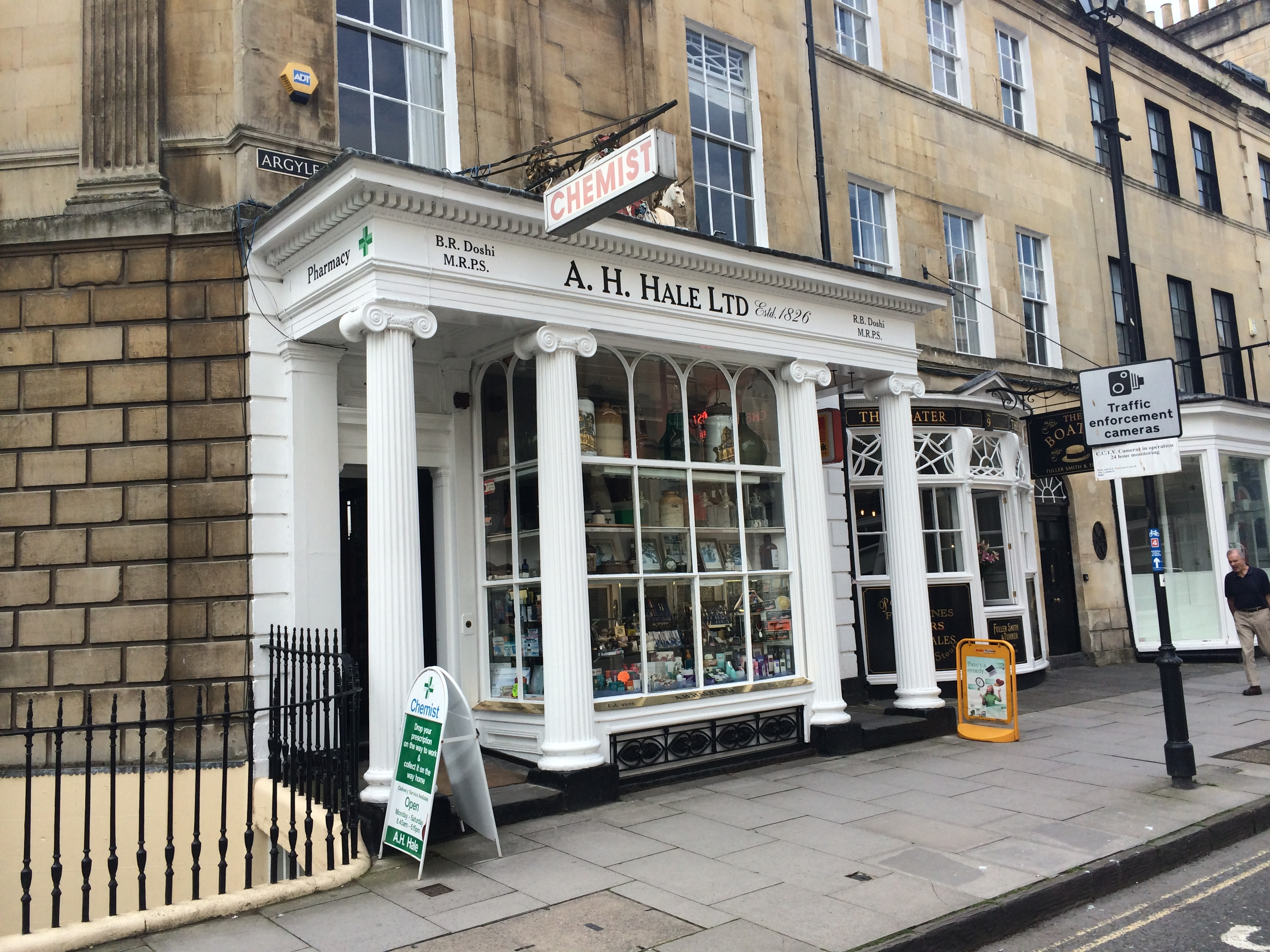
Late Georgian shopfront to Number 8

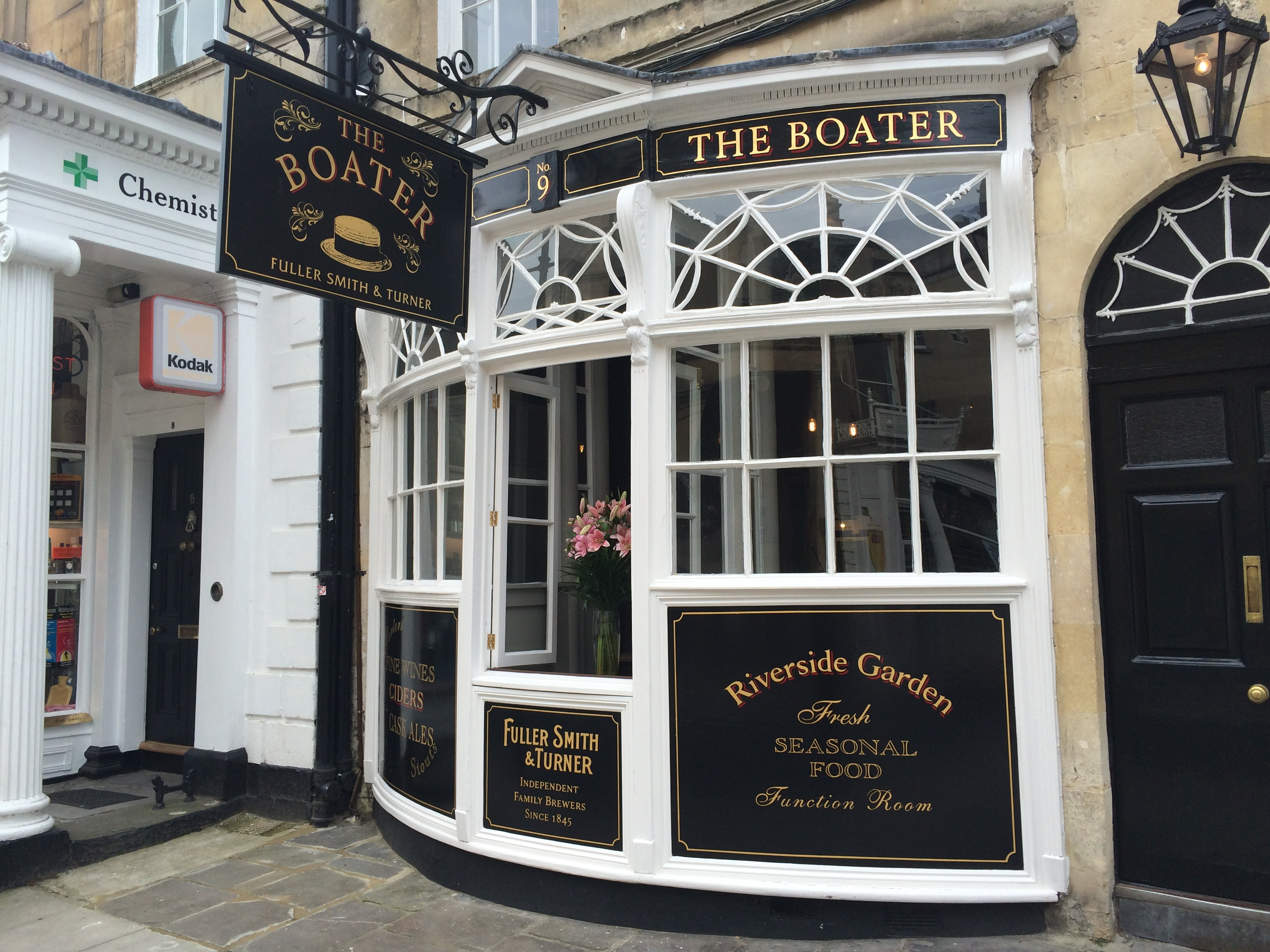
Late Georgian shopfront to Number 9

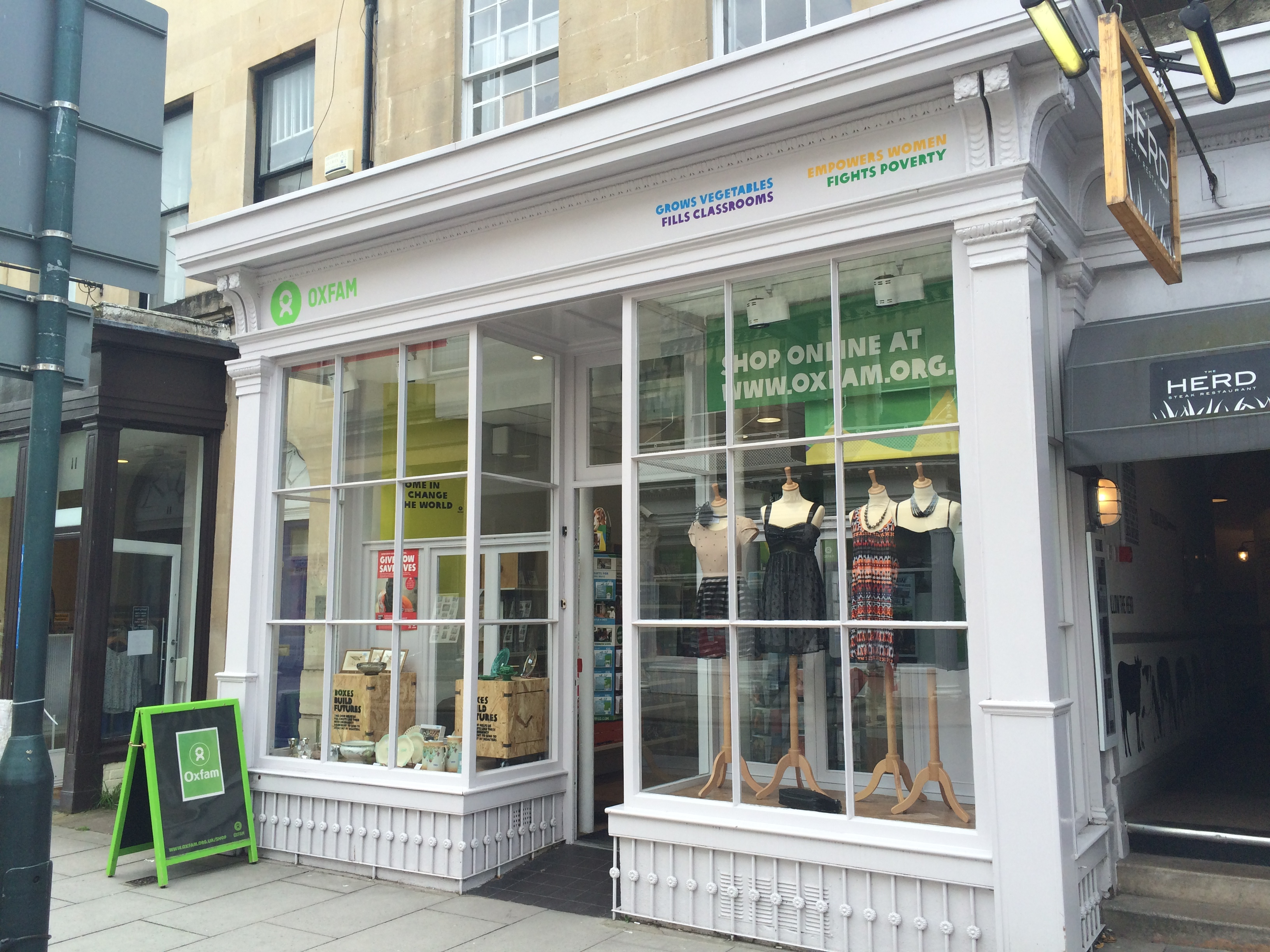
Victorian shopfront to Number 12

== See also ==
- Grade II* listed buildings in Bath and North East Somerset
