= Guildhall, Bath =

Municipal building in Bath, Somerset, England

The Guildhall
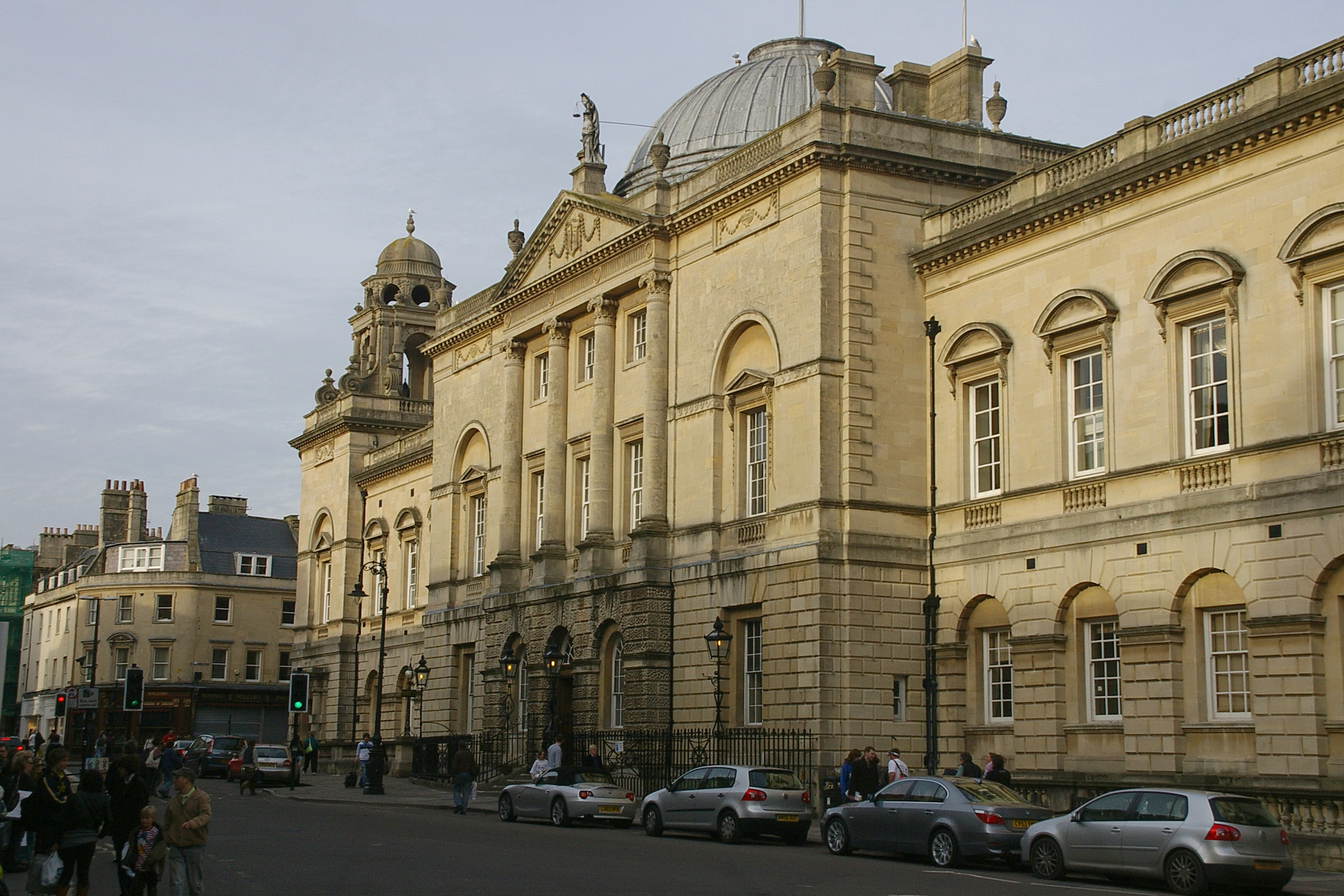

- Location within Somerset
- 51°22′55″N 2°21′32″W
- Location: Bath, Somerset, England

History
- Built: 1778

Site notes
- Architect: Thomas Baldwin

Listed Building – Grade I
- Official name: Guildhall
- Designated: 12 June 1950
- Reference no.: 1396021

Guildhall is an 18th-century municipal building in central Bath, Somerset, England. It is a Grade I listed building.

== History ==
The earliest mention of a guildhall here was in 1359, where it used to be the meeting place of the powerful trade guilds. The medieval guildhall (situated behind the modern building) was mentioned by Elizabeth Holland in 1602 as a timber-framed building with a tiled roof and stone floors strewn with rushes. This building was replaced by a Jacobean guildhall, on approximately the same site, in 1625. The building consisted of a council chamber and an armoury (where weapons were stored prior to the civil war) on the first floor. By the end of the 17th century, the room was used for social gatherings, concerts and plays.

The building was considerably enlarged to a design by William Killigrew in 1725, and a series of specially commissioned paintings by Jan Baptist van Diest was subsequently put on display.

The current Bath stone building, designed by Thomas Baldwin, was built between 1775 and 1778 and extended by John McKean Brydon in 1893. The central facade has four Ionic columns and the building is surmounted by the figure of Justice. The central dome and the north and south wings were added in 1893 and form a contiguous building with the Victoria Art Gallery, which was also built around the same time.

The interior has a banqueting hall with engaged Corinthian columns, 18th-century chandeliers and royal portraits. The room is used on royal visits to the city: Queen Elizabeth II had lunch in the banqueting room in May 2002.

The building now houses the council chamber for Bath and North East Somerset Council and the register office for Bath and North East Somerset; the building is also used as a wedding venue, and the record office also houses the Bath and North East Somerset Archives and Local Studies services. The Guildhall also serves as one of the venues for the Bath International Music Festival and other cultural events. It has been used for filming period dramas and miniseries such as The Trial of Christine Keeler (in 2019).

The 19th-century archway at the rear of the building, on Orange Grove, is a Grade II listed structure. The archway connects the Guildhall to the Old Police Station.

== Bath Guildhall Market ==
In 1552, a single-storey market house was built on the site of the medieval marketplace on High Street. This building was later demolished and combined with the Jacobean guildhall, completed in 1627. Bath Guildhall Market is behind the Guildhall, and can be accessed by its own entrance tunnel through the Guildhall. It has traded on its site for the last 800 years. About 20 stall holders trade there nowadays. The Guildhall Market suffered considerable damage in a fire on 25 April 1972.

== Gallery ==
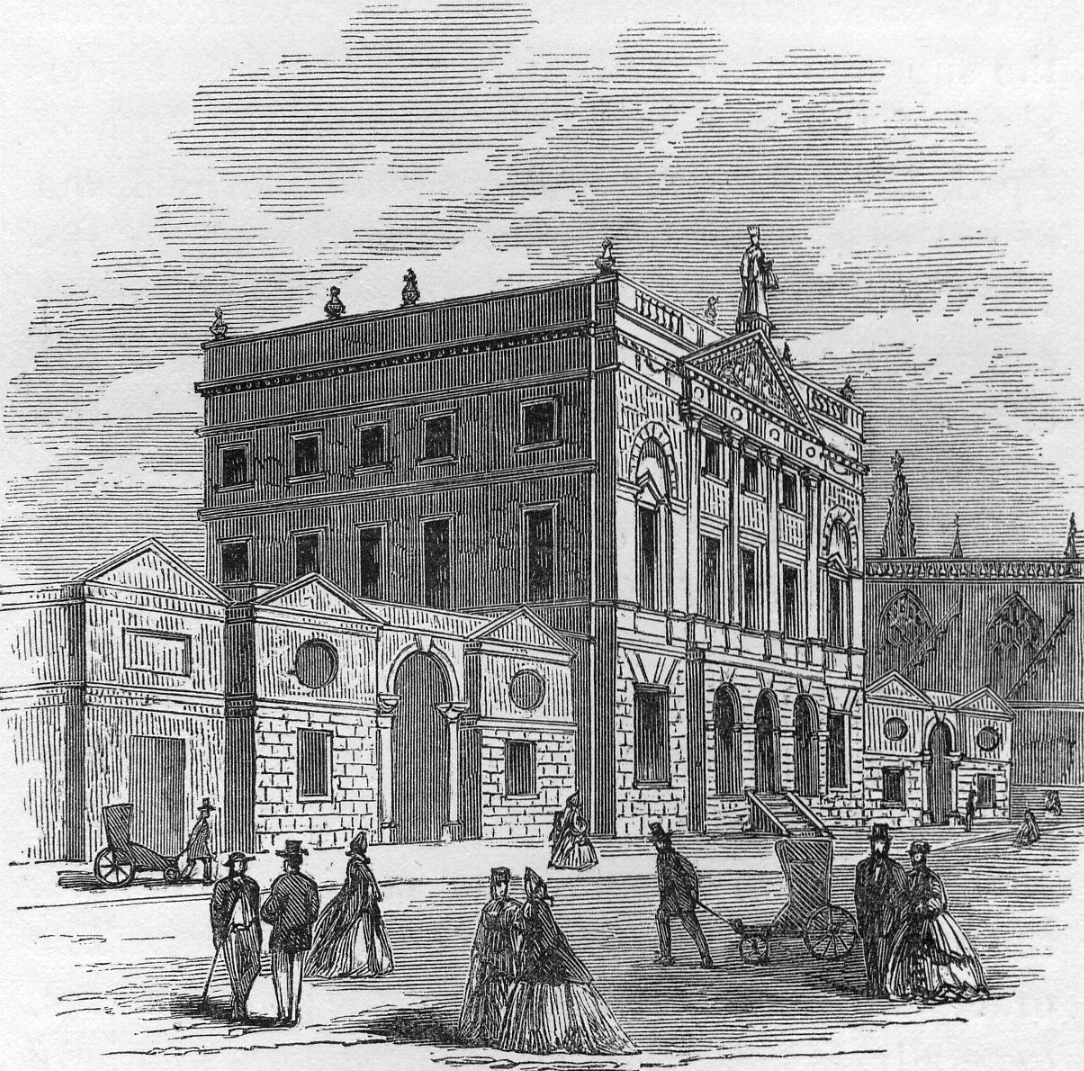
The Guildhall in 1864 before the extensions were built

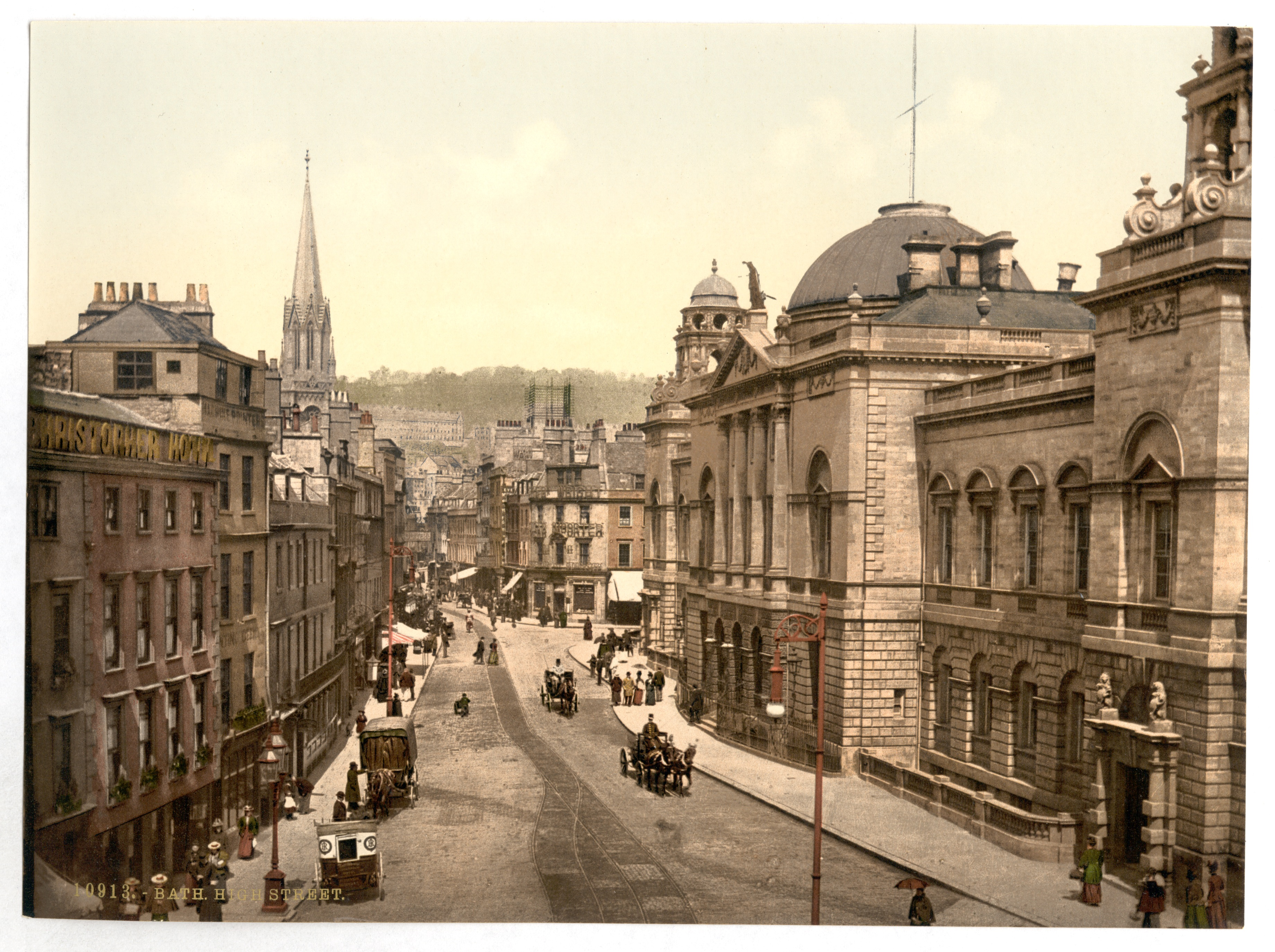
The Guildhall circa 1895

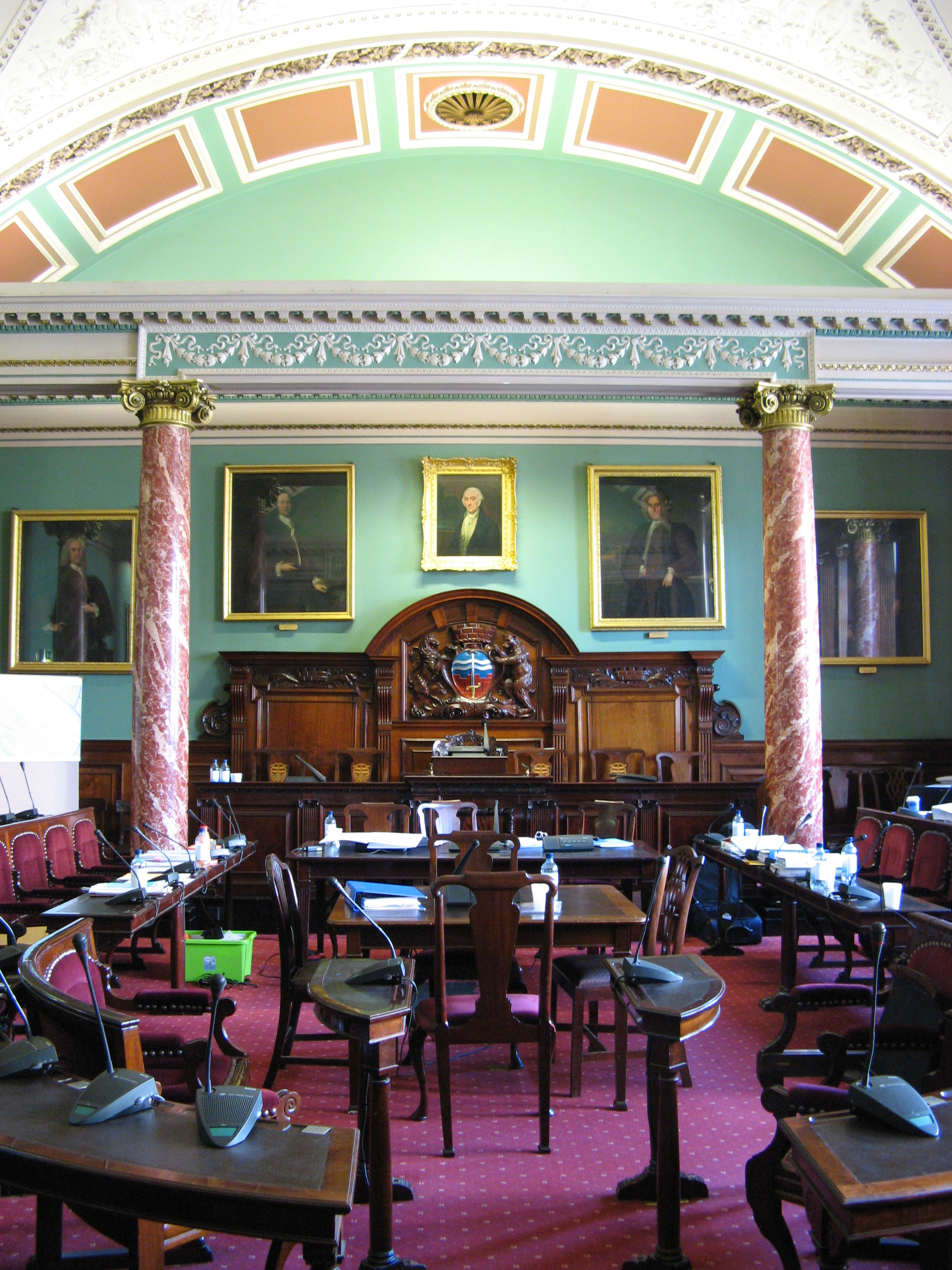
Council Chamber

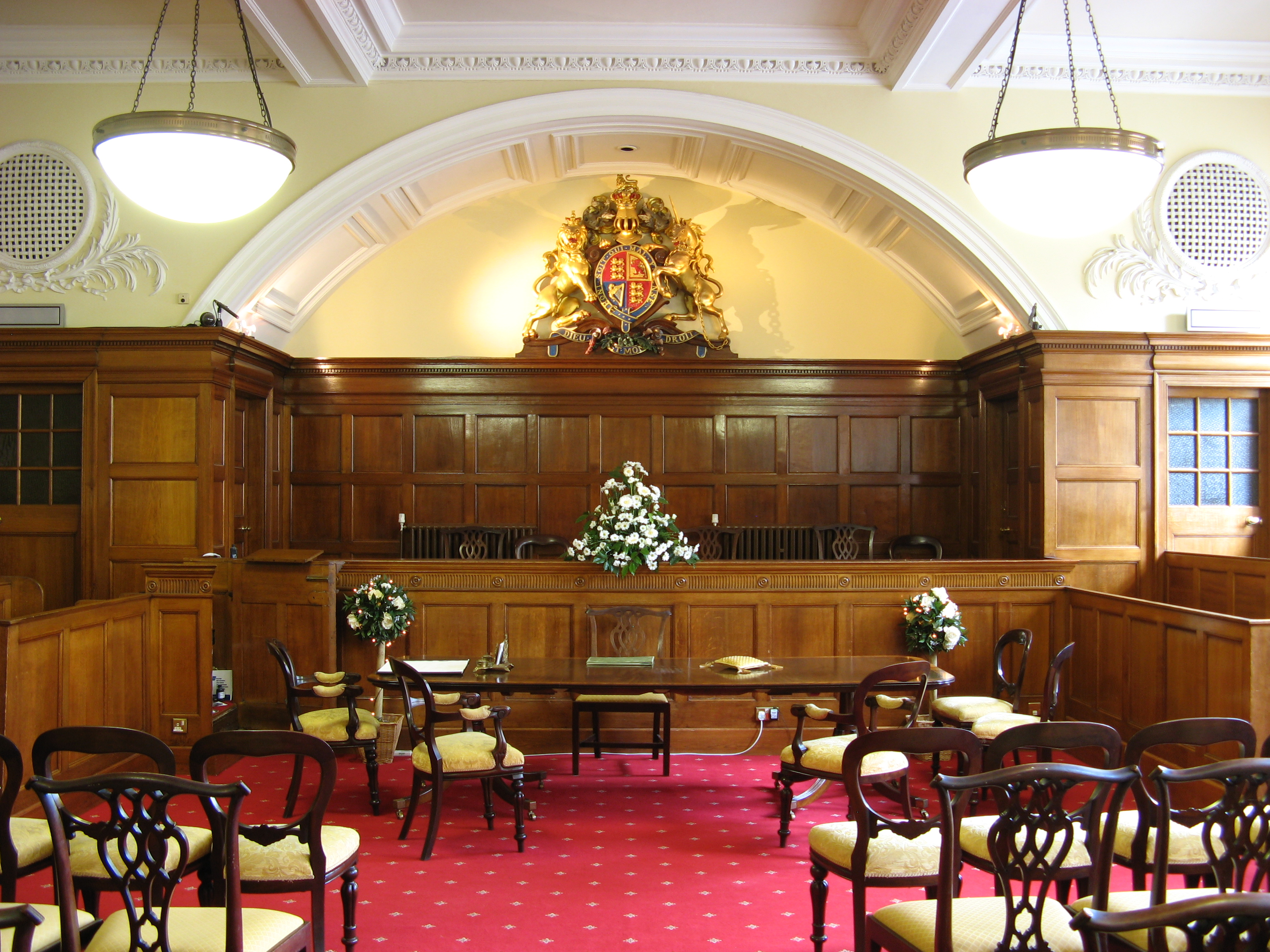
Alkmaar Room

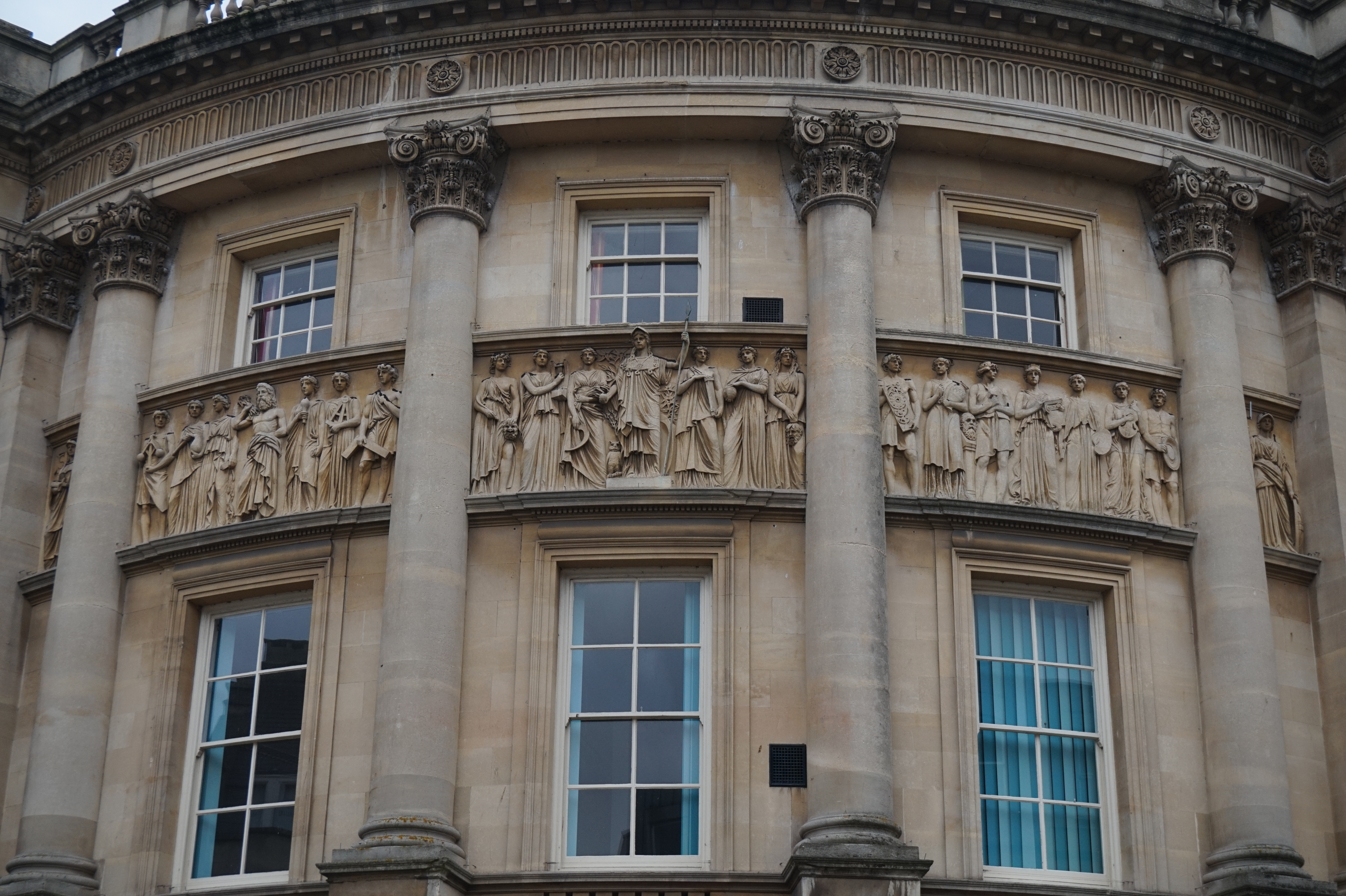
Neoclassic frieze (John Brydon, architect)
