= St Andrew's Church, Compton Bishop =

Church in Somerset, England

Church of St Andrew
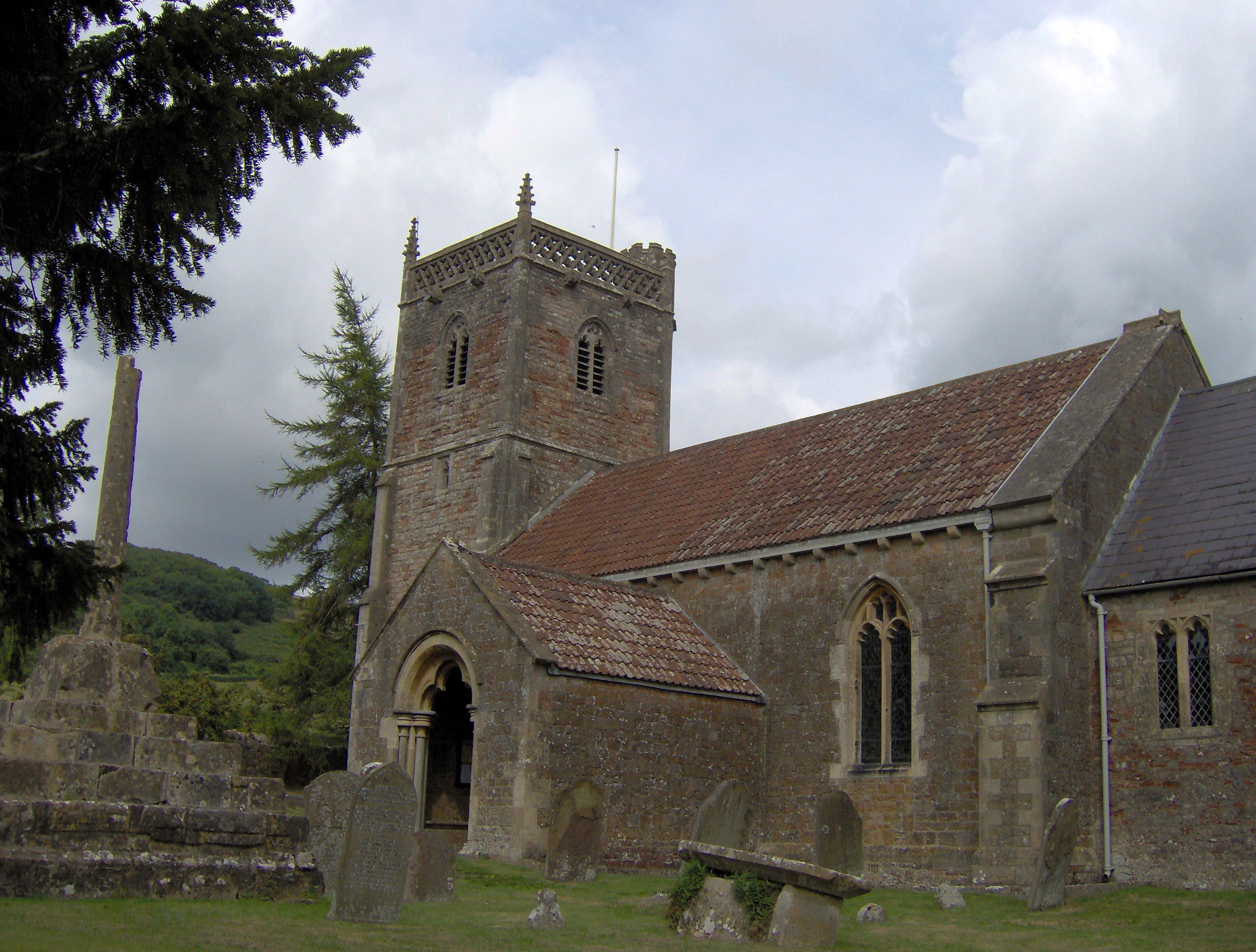

- Location within Somerset

General information
- Location: Compton Bishop, England
- Coordinates: 51.2945°N 2.8676°W
- Completed: 13th century

The Church of St Andrew in Compton Bishop, Somerset, England dates from the 13th century, being consecrated by Bishop Jocelin in 1236, with more recent restoration. It is a Grade I listed building.

The church has a 14th- or 15th-century pulpit with tracery panels, carved friezes and cresting, described as "one of the best in Somerset". Above the pulpit is a large pedimented wall monument to John Prowse who died in 1688, as well as several of his children.

The two-stage tower with pinnacles and a stair turret has been dated to around 1380, although Harvey believes it is from the 15th century. The south porch was added and the roof renewed in 1852 by the Bath architectural practice of George Phillips Manners and John Elkington Gill.

The churchyard cross is grade II listed, as are two chest tombs in the churchyard.

The church is part of Crook Peak United Parish, which also includes the churches at Badgworth, Biddisham, Christon, Loxton and Weare.

== See also ==
- List of Grade I listed buildings in Sedgemoor
- List of towers in Somerset
- List of ecclesiastical parishes in the Diocese of Bath and Wells
