= Keasberry =

Keasberry is a surname. Notable people with the surname include:

- Benjamin Keasberry (1811–1875), Indian-born Protestant missionary
- William Keasberry (1726–1797), English actor and theatre manager
