= St Michael's Church, Bath =

Church in Bath, England

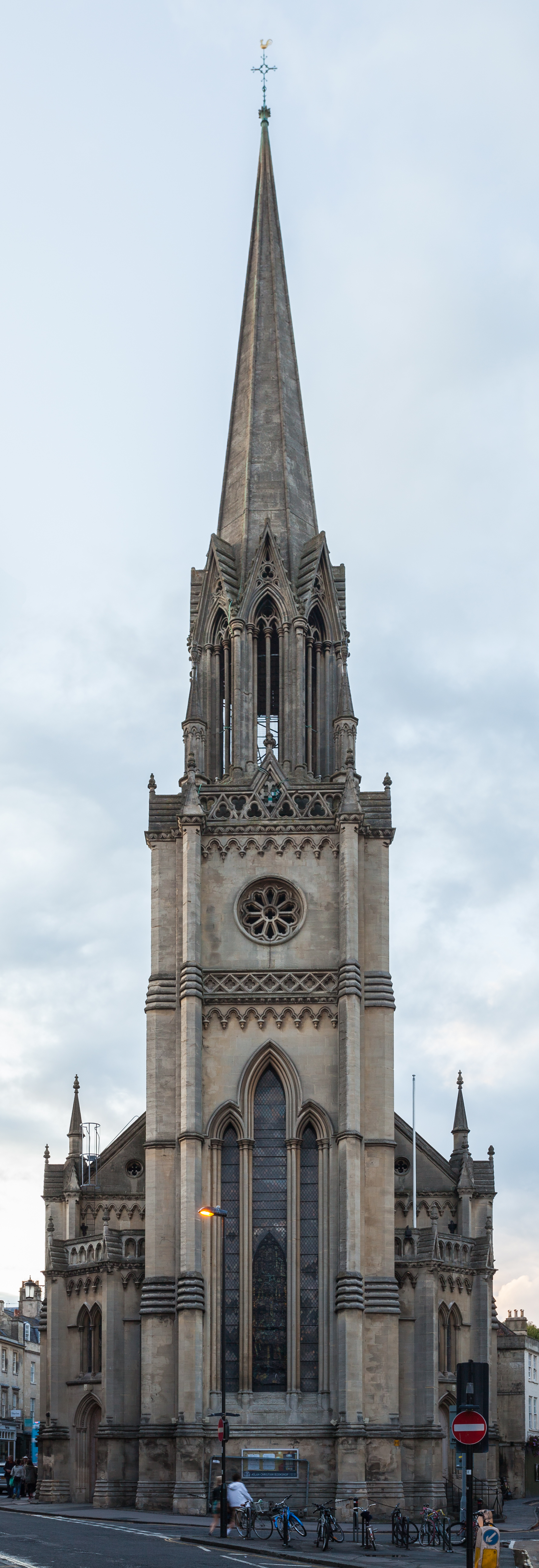
- St Michael's Church, Bath
- St Michael's Church, Bath
- 51°23′1″N 2°21′35″W
- Denomination: Church of England
- Churchmanship: Open Evangelical
- Website: www.stmichaelsbath.org.uk

History
- Dedication: St. Michael

Administration
- Province: Canterbury
- Diocese: Bath and Wells
- Parish: Bath, Somerset

St Michael's Church is a Church of England parish church in Bath, Somerset. Completed in 1837 to replace an earlier church, its spire is a landmark in the north of the city centre.

== Background ==
The church stands between Broad and Walcot Streets, where they merge onto Northgate Street, next to the Post Office building. The south tower (referred to as the W tower) fronts Northgate street and is prominent on Bath's skyline.

The church is known as St Michael's Without, it being the first church to be found outside Bath's city walls when exiting from the North Gate. The parish was in the past known as St Michael's with St Paul's. In 2013, with the closure of Holy Trinity Church on Queen's Square, the two parishes were merged and the parish reverted to its original name of St Michael Without.

== Medieval church ==
The parish has been located here, outside the city walls, since medieval times. It was outside the Northgate and would have been passed by wool merchants travelling on London Road. The area that would in Georgian times be called Bath New Town (not to be confused with neighbouring Bathwick New Town) was known as St. Michael's.

== Georgian church ==
Designed and constructed by craftsman J. Harvey between 1734 and 1742, the structure featured an impressive dome and was half the size of the current Victorian structure. The church is associated with several famous people. The actress Elizabeth Linley was baptised here in 1754. Lord Byron's parents, John Byron and Catherine Gordon, were married here on 13 May 1785.

== Victorian church ==
The Georgian church was rebuilt in 1835–1837 to designs in Early English style by G. P. Manners, the city architect. The building provided seating for 780 and cost £6,000.

The rectangular limestone ashlar building is under one roof to provide enough height in the aisles to accommodate galleries (since removed). The tall three-light aisle windows have pointed heads and decorative colonnettes, and the tower which projects to the south has a matching, taller, triple window on its south side below a smaller rose window. The tower carries an ornate octagonal open lantern and a spire.

Fittings include canvasses from the mid-18th century altar-piece of the earlier church, among them a Christ with the Cross by William Hoare. The organ was installed by William Sweetland in 1847. The interior of the church was remodelled in 1901 by Wallace Gill.

The church was designated as Grade II* listed in 1950. The listing describes it as a notable example of a pre-Pugin Gothic Revival church with an opulent High Victorian sanctuary, and notes that the high-quality interior is in fine condition.

== See also ==
- List of ecclesiastical parishes in the Diocese of Bath and Wells
