= St Paul's Church, Tiverton =

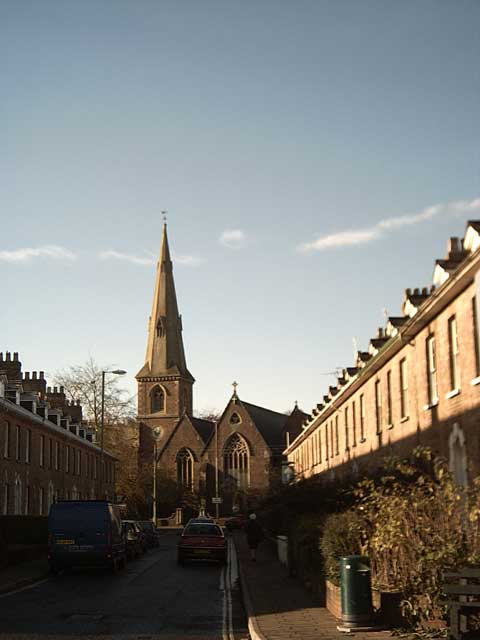
- St Paul's Church, Tiverton
- St Paul's Church, Tiverton
- 50°54′8.69″N 3°29′35.46″W
- OS grid reference: SS 95111 12525
- Location: Tiverton, Devon
- Country: England
- Denomination: Church of England
- Website: Tivertonchurch.org

Architecture
- Heritage designation: Grade II listed
- Architect(s): George Phillips Manners and John Elkington Gill
- Groundbreaking: 1854
- Completed: 1856

Administration
- Diocese: Diocese of Exeter
- Archdeaconry: Exeter
- Deanery: Tiverton

St Paul's Church, Tiverton, is a Grade II listed parish church in the Church of England in Tiverton, Devon.

== History ==
The church was built between 1854 and 1856 by George Phillips Manners and John Elkington Gill of Bath. The site was given by John Heathcoat and the construction cost was met by Ambrose Brewin and Mary Beard's charity.

The chancel was raised and refurbished by Nevinson and Newton in 1910 and 1911.

== Organ ==
The organ was paid for by John Heathcoat. The organ case is by H. P. Dicker of Exeter and dates from 1857. It was originally located at the west end. A specification of the organ can be found on the National Pipe Organ Register.
