= Clandown =

Village in Somerset, England

Coordinates: 51.3017°N 2.4575°W

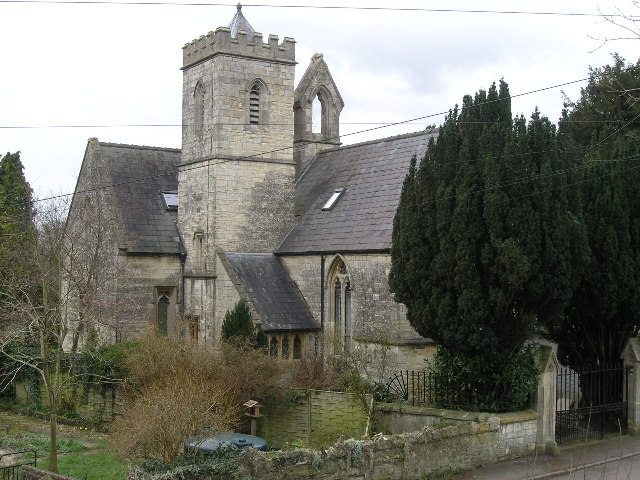
former Holy Trinity Church, Clandown

Clandown is a village lying north of Radstock in Somerset, England, just off the Fosseway. It is 1 mile (1.6 km) north of Radstock. The nearby Bowlditch Quarry is a 0.25 hectare geological Site of Special Scientific Interest.

== History ==
Clandown was formerly a mining village, on the Somerset Coalfield, but the last pits in the area closed in the late 1960s. The colliery at Clandown opened in 1811 and closed in 1929 and had a maximum shaft depth of 1,437 feet (438 m). In 1896 it was owned by the trustees of the late C. Hollewy and by 1908 by the Clandown Colliery Co.

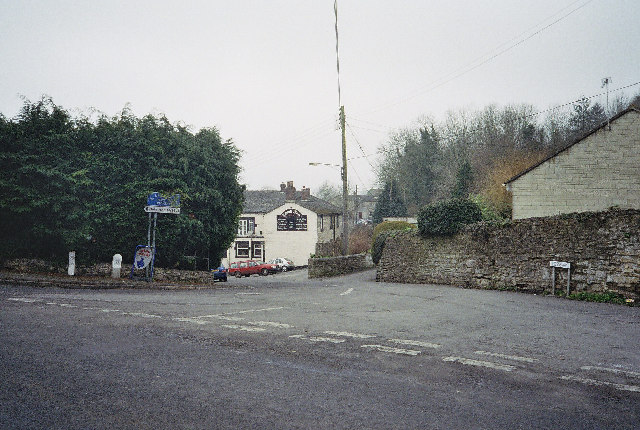
Road junction in Clandown with the Lamb Inn in the background

Artefacts from a Roman site have been found close to the village. Clandown Farmhouse on Pow's Hill was built in the 1720s. As well as a church, there were two chapels and three public houses. One of the chapels has been demolished and the other has been converted to apartments. Two pubs have been demolished. A school was opened in 1861 (there having been a dame school before this) and closed in 2006.

== Governance ==
Clandown forms part of the North East Somerset and Hanham constituency, which elects a Member of Parliament to the House of Commons of the Parliament of the United Kingdom. It was also part of the South West England constituency of the European Parliament prior to Britain leaving the European Union in January 2020.

Almost all significant local government functions are carried out by Bath and North East Somerset, a unitary authority.

== Religious sites ==
The Church of the Holy Trinity was built in the 1840s in a perpendicular style, designed by George Phillips Manners. It was built for the Rev. Charles Otway Mayne of Midsomer Norton. It has a small three-stage tower, a two bay nave and two bay chancel. It is a Grade II listed building. The building is now used as a residence.
