= Mechanics' Institute Library =

Mechanics' Institute Library may refer to:

- Mechanics Institute Library, King City, Ontario, which became part of the King Township Public Library system
- Bradford Mechanics' Institute Library, established 1832 in Bradford, United Kingdom
- San Francisco Mechanics' Institute Library of the Mechanics' Institute, San Francisco
- PMI Victorian History Library, a library in Victoria, Australia

== See also ==
- Mechanics' Institutes
