= Holy Trinity Church, Clandown =

Church in Somerset, England

Holy Trinity Church
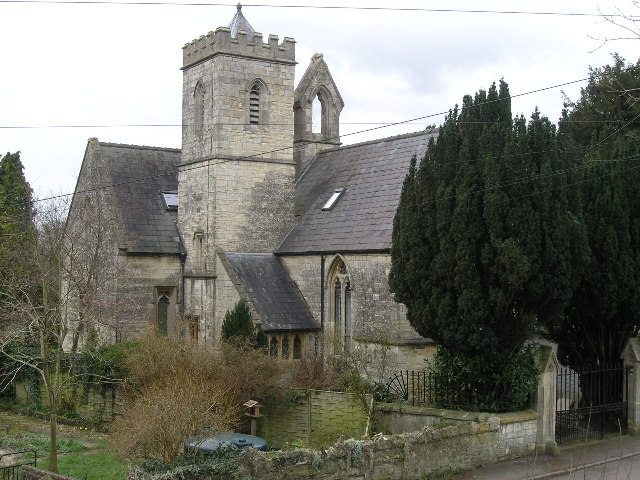

Religion
- Affiliation: Church of England
- Ecclesiastical or organizational status: Closed
- Year consecrated: 1847

Location
- Location: Clandown, Somerset, England
- Interactive map of Holy Trinity Church
- Coordinates: 51.3024°N 2.4609°W

Architecture
- Architect: George Phillips Manners
- Type: Church

Holy Trinity Church is a former Church of England church in Clandown, Somerset, England. Designed by George Phillips Manners, it was built in 1846–47 and closed in 1983. The church, now a private residence, is a Grade II listed building.

== History ==
Prior to the construction of Holy Trinity, the residents of Clandown were served by the parish church of St John at Midsomer Norton. In circa 1834, the Bishop of Bath and Wells licensed a schoolroom at Clandown to be used for services, but the increasing population led to the need for better church accommodation. Rev. Charles Otway Mayne, the vicar of Midsomer Norton, began raising funds for a purpose-built church by grants and private subscription. Plans for the church and its parsonage house were drawn up by George Phillips Manners, with Mr. John Thatcher of Weston hired as the builder. The Church Building Association granted £105 in late 1845 and the Prince of Wales donated £100 in early 1846. £300 was also received from the Incorporated Society.

The church's corner stone was laid by Mr. W. C. James on 29 June 1846. The church was completed but awaited consecration by February 1847, when an appeal was made to raise the remaining £500 required. A further £350 had been raised by the time the church was consecrated by the Bishop of Bath and Wells, the Right Rev. Richard Bagot, on 19 October 1847. £2,200 had been spent on the church and its parsonage house. In addition to the remaining debt of £150, a further £500 was required for the endowment. Clandown was made its own ecclesiastical parish in 1849.

Holy Trinity was declared redundant on 1 March 1983 and permission was granted in 1983-84 for its conversion into a single dwelling. The potential use of the church as a community hall was investigated in 1986, but the church was subsequently sold by the Church Commissioners to a private owner in 1987. In 1988–89, planning permission was granted to split the church into two dwellings. Retrospective permission was granted in 2014 for the building's conversion into a single residence.

== Architecture ==
Holy Trinity is built of local stone with slate roofs in the Perpendicular style. It has a cruciform plan and is made up of a two-bay nave, chancel, transepts, vestry, south porch, tower and bellcote. The church was designed to accommodate 380 persons.
