= Bowlditch Quarry =

Geological Site of Special Scientific Interest in Somerset, England

- Site of Special Scientific Interest
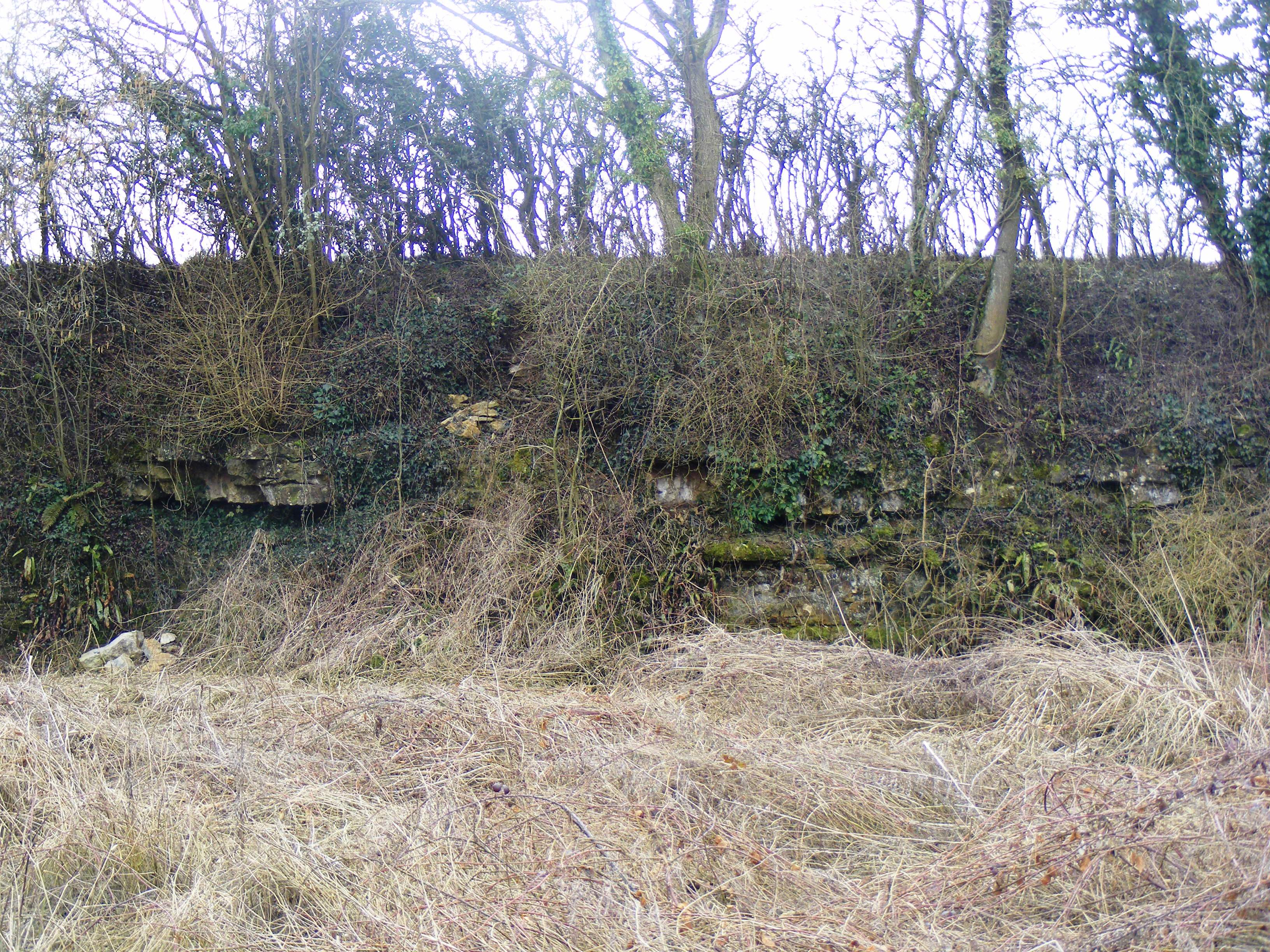

- Location within Somerset
- Location of Bowlditch Quarry.
- Area of search: Avon
- Grid reference: ST668558
- Coordinates: 51.30035°N 2.47759°W
- Interest: Geological
- Area: 0.6 acres (0.0024 km^{2}; 0.00094 sq mi)
- Notification date: 1952

Bowlditch Quarry (grid reference ST668558) is a 0.25 hectare geological Site of Special Scientific Interest near the village of Clandown, Bath and North East Somerset, notified in 1952.

The site provides a remarkable attenuated and broken succession stretching from the top of the Rhaetian to the lowest Pliensbachian periods. This Lias section provides a good example of biostratigraphic principles.
