= Theatre Royal, Bath =

Theatre in Bath, Somerset, England

Theatre Royal
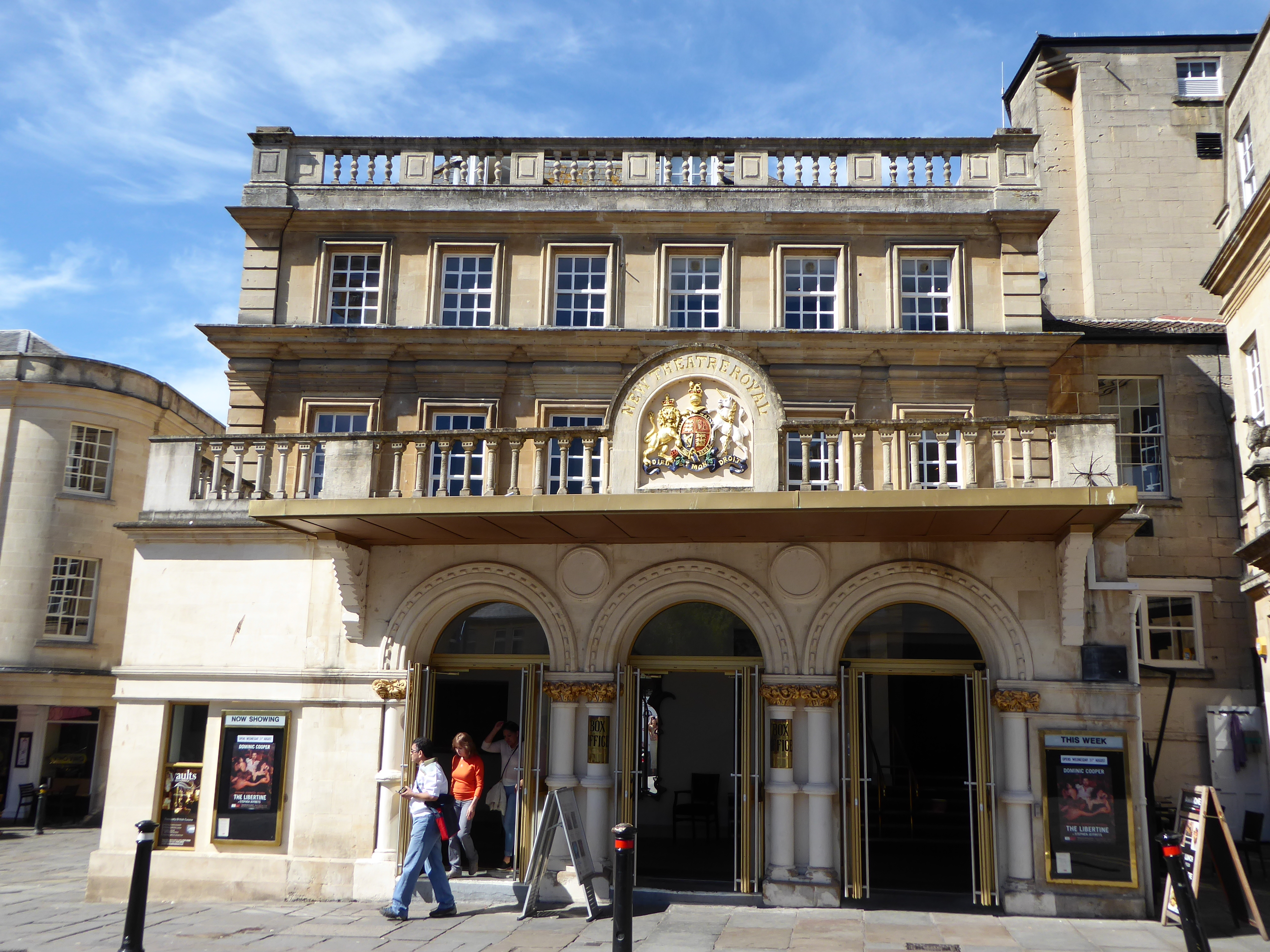
- The entrance from Sawclose which was added in 1863

- Shown within Somerset
- Address: Sawclose, Bath, BA1 1ET; Bath; England
- Coordinates: 51.3821°N 2.3629°W
- Capacity: 888
- Type: Provincial
- Designation: Listed Building Grade II*

Construction
- Opened: 1805
- Rebuilt: 1863
- Architects: John Palmer, George Dance

Website
- www.theatreroyal.org.uk

The Theatre Royal in Bath, England, was built in 1805. A Grade II* listed building, it has been described by the Theatres Trust as "One of the most important surviving examples of Georgian theatre architecture". It has a capacity for an audience of around 900.

The Theatre Royal was built to replace the Old Orchard Street Theatre, funded by a tontine and elaborately decorated. The architect was George Dance the Younger, with John Palmer carrying out much of the work. It opened with a performance of Shakespeare's Richard III and hosted performances by many leading actors of the time including Dorothea Jordan, William Macready and Edmund Kean. A major fire in 1862 destroyed the interior of the building and was quickly followed by a rebuilding programme by Charles J. Phipps, which included the construction of the current entrance. Further redecoration was undertaken in 1892; more extensive building work, including a new staircase and the installation of electric lighting, followed in 1902. Despite performances by casts including Sarah Bernhardt, the ballerina Anna Pavlova and Mrs. Patrick Campbell, the theatre was rarely very profitable. During World War II Donald Wolfit, Irene Vanbrugh, John Gielgud and Sybil Thorndike appeared, with shows including Noël Coward's Private Lives and Blithe Spirit, a performance by Ballet Rambert and light entertainment such as Charley's Aunt, but audiences declined.

In 1979 the theatre was bought by a trust and, following public donations, it underwent refurbishment, with the rebuilding of the stage and the installation of a new taller fly tower for scenery and lighting. In 1997 a new 120-seat theatre, known as the Ustinov Studio, was opened. Further restoration work to the main auditorium was needed in 2010. In 2005 a children's theatre known as The Egg was opened. The complex also includes bars and The Garrick's Head pub.

== History ==
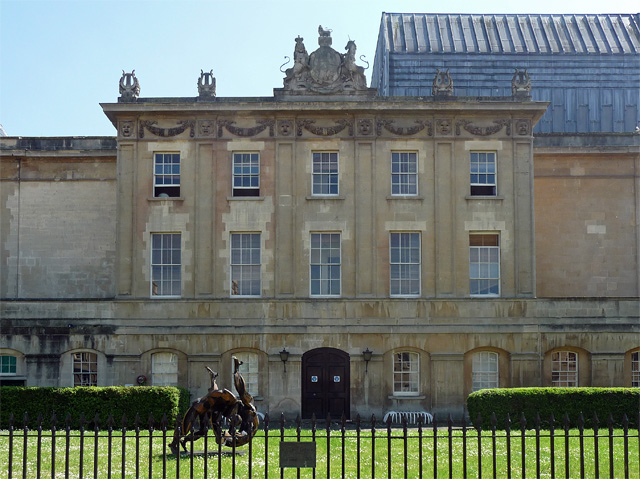
The original entrance from Beauford Square. The fly tower which was added in 1980 can be seen above the façade.

=== Construction ===
The theatre was erected in 1805, replacing the Old Orchard Street Theatre which had obtained a royal patent by the Bath Theatre Act 1768 (8 Geo. 3. c. 10) enabling the use of the title 'Theatre Royal', the first to achieve this outside London. The Orchard Street site became a church and is now a Freemason's Hall. The new theatre was first proposed in 1802 at several sites in Bath until the current site was chosen in 1804; funding was raised by the use of a tontine, an investment plan named after the Neapolitan banker Lorenzo de Tonti, who is credited with inventing it in France in 1653. It combined features of a group annuity and a lottery. Each subscriber paid an agreed sum into the fund, and thereafter received an annuity. As members died, their shares devolved to the other participants, and so the value of each annuity increased. On the death of the last member, the scheme was wound up. Shares, which cost £200, were rapidly purchased, with the Prince Regent, who later became George IV, and his brother Prince Frederick among the subscribers. A similar scheme had previously been used for the construction of the Bath Assembly Rooms.

The exterior of the building, with arches, pilasters, garlands and ornaments, which is visible from Beauford Square, was designed by George Dance the Younger who also designed the decorative sections of the interior. The main fabric of the building was by John Palmer, who supervised the construction. The ceiling was decorated with panels from Fonthill Splendens, a mile from Fonthill Abbey, which were painted by Andrea Casali and donated to the theatre by Paul Cobb Methuen. Because of the potential damage from the gas lights, which were installed in 1827, the paintings were moved by William Blathwayt to Dyrham Park.

The opening night was on 12 October 1805 was a production of Richard III, with an unknown actor in the lead. Though not a success, the theatre soon established a good reputation and thrived under the management of William Wyatt Dimond. Early performances included appearances by the child actors Master Betty and Clara Fisher, with adult leads from prominent actors on the London stage including Dorothea Jordan, William Macready and Edmund Kean. In addition to Shakespeare and other serious drama, the productions included opera and comedy with Joseph Grimaldi playing the clown in a pantomime of Mother Goose in November 1815.

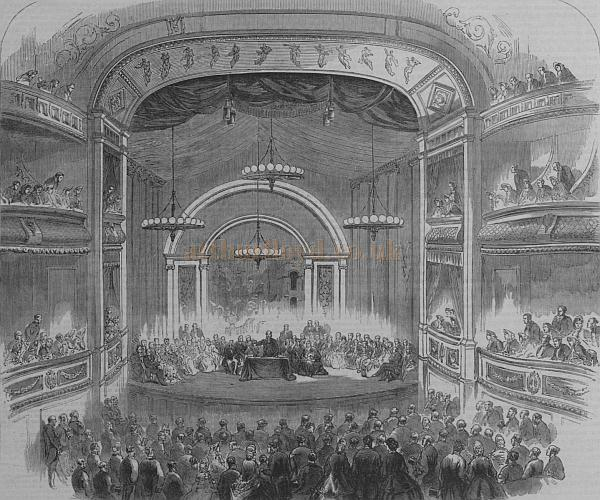
The auditorium of the Theatre Royal in 1864 during a meeting of the British Association. First published in the Illustrated London News

Between the 1810s and 1850s there were a series of changes in ownership and management. These coincided with a Puritan revival and a fall in Bath's popularity; reductions in receipts were compounded by rising payments for actors from London. As a result, the theatre underwent financial crises and fell into a period of decline. Fortunes began to improve when James Henry Chute, who was the manager of the Bath Assembly Rooms and the son-in-law of the owner Mrs Macready, took over as the manager of the theatre and once again audiences began to rise.

=== Fire and rebuilding ===
On 18 April 1862 a major fire destroyed the interior of the building including the stage, scenery, wardrobe and library, leaving just the exterior walls still standing. A new company was formed to rebuild the theatre and a competition held for designs. The winner was C.J. Phipps and rebuilding, which included the new entrance on Sawclose, quickly followed. The present main entrance to the Theatre Royal, in Sawclose, was built in 1720 by Thomas Greenway, and was previously at Beau Nash's house. Pevsner criticizes the mouldings of window-frames, frieze and volutes of the door-hood brackets as "characteristically overdone", and mentions Wood citing its "profuse ornament" which was typical of a mason rather than an architect. Chute remained as manager and employed Charles Kean and Ellen Terry to play in A Midsummer Night's Dream on the opening night, 3 March 1863.

Initially the reopened theatre struggled to become profitable despite appearances by Henry Irving among others. In 1885 William Lewis took over as the lessee and was followed, in 1892, by his son Egbert Lewis. They redecorated the theatre in 1892 and attracted larger regular audiences to performances of melodrama and comedy while starting to put on Gilbert and Sullivan operas and other attractions.

=== 20th century ===
In 1902 the theatre closed for nine months to enable extensive building work to be carried out in accordance with the terms of the Royal Charter. This involved a new staircase, the installation of electric lighting, a new fire curtain and hot water radiators throughout the auditorium. In 1905, on the anniversary of the opening of the Theatre Royal, numerous William Shakespeare's plays were performed by the company of actors led by Frank Benson.

In 1914 the theatre impresario Arthur Carlton, from Worcester, took over the lease. As he was responsible for 14 theatres around the country at the time, he appointed Mrs D. Valantine Munro as the local manager. Performances were maintained during World War I, and in 1916 Sarah Bernhardt portrayed a wounded male French soldier in Du Théâtre au Champ d'Honneur. In the 1920s there were appearances by the Russian ballerina Anna Pavlova and Mrs. Patrick Campbell. During the Great Depression of the 1930s the theatre was not profitable and closed completely for six months. In 1938 the lease was taken over by Reg Maddox, whose family were involved with the theatre for the next 40 years. During World War II the theatre fared better, with appearances by prominent actors including Donald Wolfit, Irene Vanbrugh, John Gielgud and Sybil Thorndike. In the Post-War years, receipts suffered as audiences dwindled in the face of competition from cinema and television. Unsuccessful proposals were made for a trust to run the theatre in 1968, and in the 1970s, shares in the owning company were bought by the property developer Charles Ware, who sold to Charles Clarke, a solicitor from Bristol. Clarke was responsible for a redecoration of the building, but as profits were still small, in 1976 he sold it to Louis I. Michaels, who ran the Haymarket Theatre in London.

In March 1979, the dilapidated theatre was purchased by a trust headed by Jeremy Fry for £155,000. The following year, an appeal was launched to raise money for renovations, including the complete rebuilding of the stage, installation of a steel grid to hold stage lighting and scenery and a higher fly system, to allow major touring companies, including the Royal National Theatre under Peter Hall, to be booked to perform. The total projected cost was £3.5 million, of which £1.8 million was seen as being essential to reopening the theatre. Money and donations in kind were received from the city council, Arts Council England, Bath Preservation Trust, Leche Trust, Historic buildings council, Manifold Trust, South-West Stonecleaning and Restoration Company and many individuals. Work on the building started to designs by Dowton and Hurst. However, as insufficient funds had been raised by 1982 to complete the work, loans were negotiated with the Bristol & West and Lombard North Central with guarantees from local councils. The theatre reopened on 30 November 1982 with a performance of A Midsummer Night's Dream, featuring a cast from the National Theatre led by Paul Scofield. The event was attended by Princess Margaret, Countess of Snowdon.

=== 2010 refurbishment ===
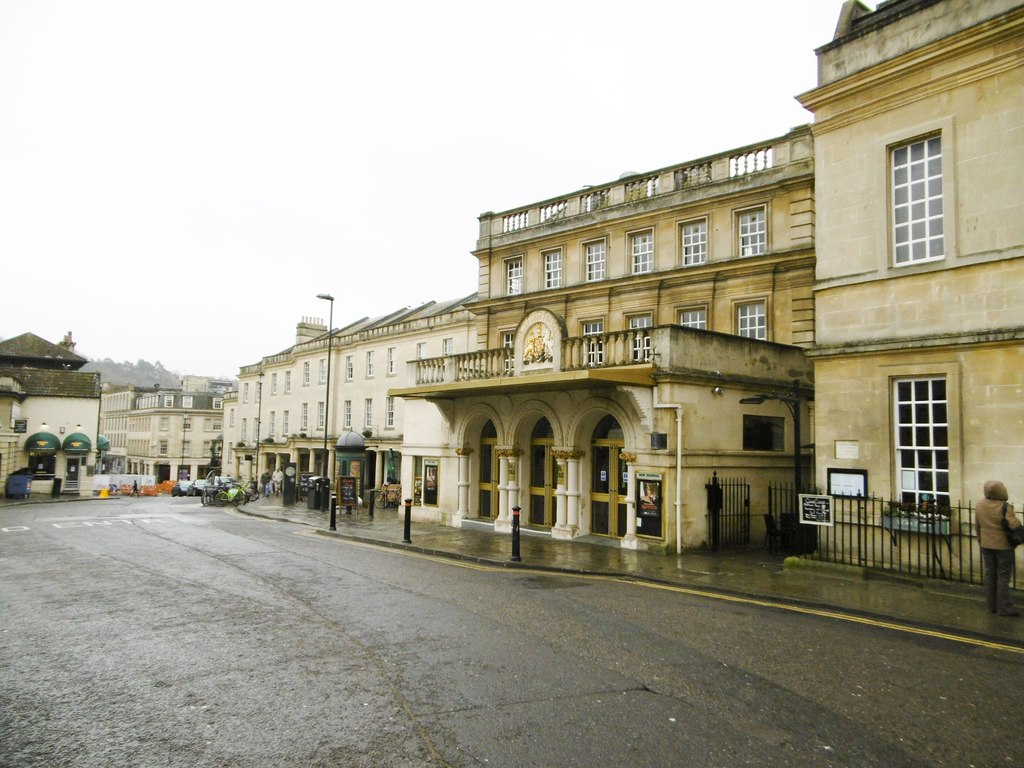
The theatre in 2015

In October 2009, the '2010 Refurbishment Appeal' was launched by Camilla, Duchess of Cornwall, Royal Patron of the Theatre Royal Bath, to raise money for a programme of work to preserve the 200-year-old building, while ensuring that it remained suitable for 21st-century audiences. The £3million refurbishment, the most extensive programme of work since the theatre had been saved from virtual collapse by Fry almost 30 years before, included an expanded foyer, improved lift and disabled access to the stalls and royal circle levels, complete refurbishment of the bars and the creation of The Jeremy Fry Bar, in the former cellars of The Garrick's Head pub, and redecoration of the auditorium. Technical improvements included the rebuilding of the Main House stage, and an extensive rewiring and lighting programme around the entire building, with new fire alarm systems, air-conditioning and lighting, all designed to improve the building's efficiency and reduce the carbon footprint by some 30%. The design was by architects of the Fielden Clegg Bradley Studios, and the construction firm Midas was contracted to complete the building work.

A successful campaign, led by writer and novelist Bel Mooney, who had been instrumental in previous fund-raising campaigns for the Theatre Royal Bath, saw almost a third of the money raised through donations and sponsorship, enabling work to begin away from public areas in March 2010. The theatre's Main House was closed in July 2010, to allow the work on the foyer, bars and auditorium to be completed.

The official re-opening took place on Wednesday, 8 September 2010, just ten and a half months after the original campaign was launched, with the building work being completed on schedule. The ceremonial re-opening was performed on-stage by actors Penelope Keith and Peter Bowles, who were starring in the Theatre Royal's own production of The Rivals, Richard Brinsley Sheridan's classic Restoration comedy, set in and around 18th-century Bath. In 2011, the theatre won a British Construction Industry Award Conservation Award.

The theatre itself is said to be haunted by several ghosts including the Grey Lady, who was an actress centuries ago. She has been seen watching productions in the Grey Lady Box, and she leaves the distinctive scent of jasmine. She has purportedly been seen and scented in recent years.

== Architecture and features ==
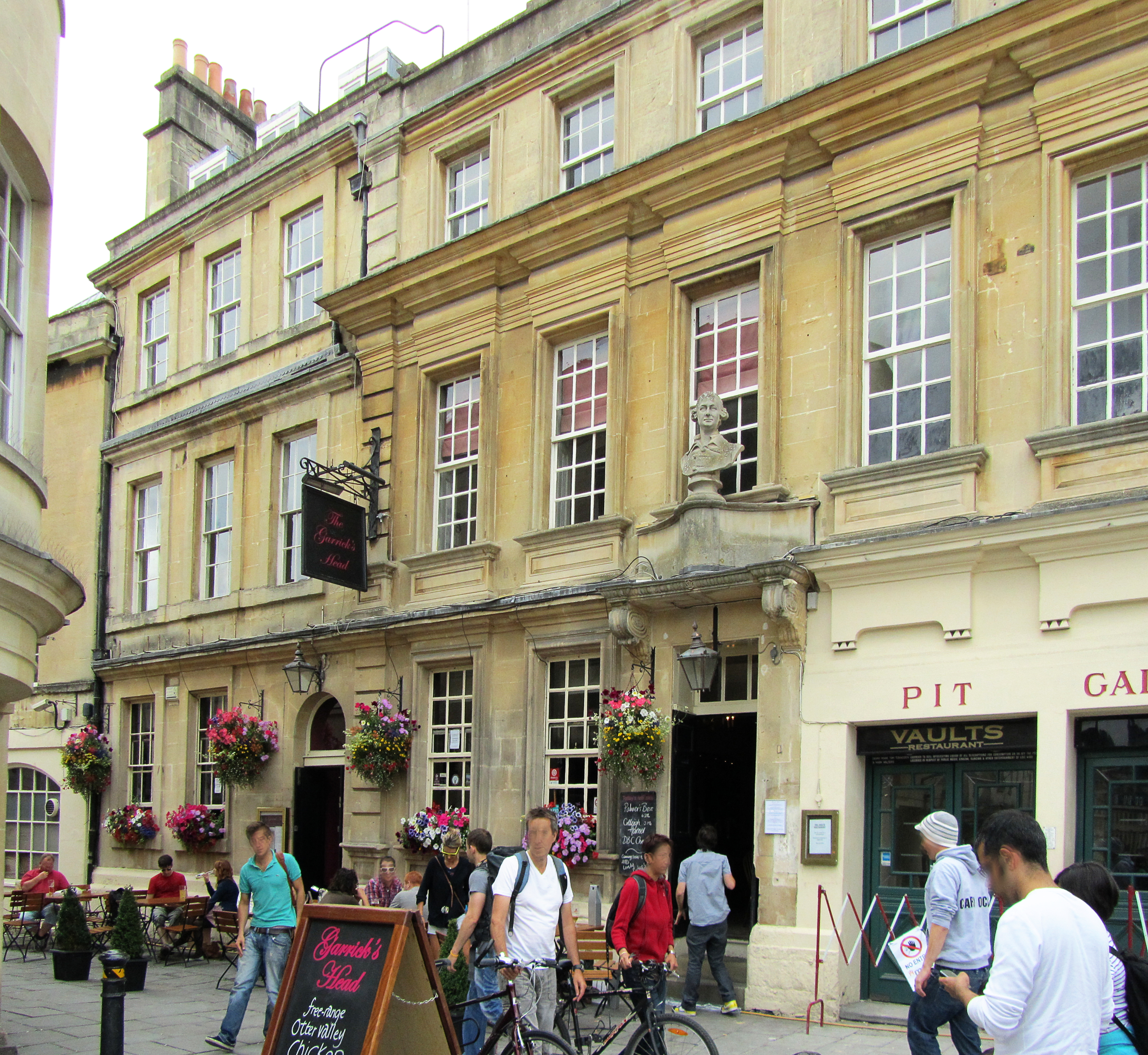
The Garrick's Head on St John's Close

The theatre, along with the neighbouring Garrick's Head public house, is a Grade II* listed building and is considered a prime example of Georgian architecture. The oldest part of the building is the former Garrick's Head on St John's Close. The three storey five bay building, with a basement, has a hipped roof with a part-balustraded parapet. Above the door is a bust of David Garrick, which was made in 1831 by Lucius Gahagan. The Beauford Square side of the building, originally designed by George Dance the Younger, is of five bays with pilasters carrying a frieze of comic and tragic muses. The central door was the main entrance for the pit and galleries. The east front, now the main entrance which opens onto Sawclose, was altered from a plain six-bay entrance by the addition of the round-arched foyer hiding four of the original bays. The 900-seat auditorium has tiers of ornate plasterwork, with red and gilt decoration, and a trompe-l'œil ceiling and glittering chandelier. It has three galleries in a horseshoe plan, supported by cast iron pillars.

In 2017 the Sawclose area between the current Theatre Royal main entrance and the former Bluecoat School was made into a pedestrian-friendly shared space area for pedestrians, cyclists and cars.

=== Ustinov Studio ===
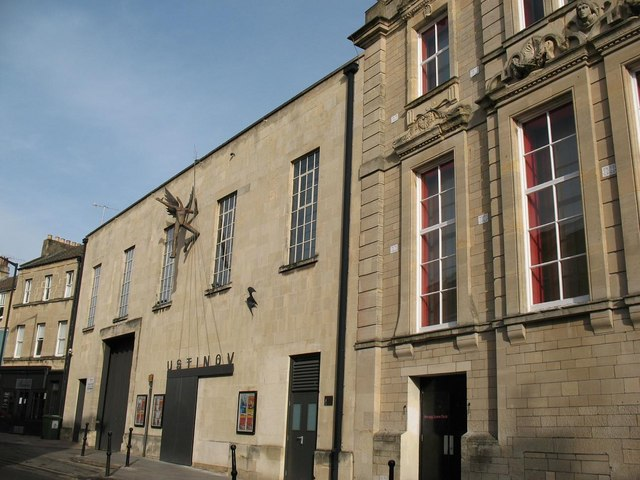
Frontage of the Ustinov Studio

In 1997, a studio theatre was built at the rear of the building on Monmouth Street, called the Ustinov Studio, named after the actor Peter Ustinov. The front of the building is decorated with a bronze winged figure which was designed by his son, Igor Ustinov, entitled Hopefully. The 150-seat auditorium was originally a space for the youth theatre and small-scale touring productions, but the Ustinov programme soon expanded to encompass classical concerts, stand-up comedy (including high-profile acts such as Bill Bailey, Stewart Lee and Lucy Porter) and in-house productions. To accommodate the technical needs of these productions, a refurbishment was planned to take place throughout 2007, improving the backstage & technical facilities, the foyer, bar and auditorium. The Ustinov Studio re-opened in February 2008, with their own production of Breakfast With Mugabe, starring Joseph Marcell, Miles Anderson and Nicholas Bailey.

In 2011, Laurence Boswell was appointed the first Artistic Director of the Ustinov Studio. In the 2012 American Season at the Ustinov Studio, Sarah Ruhl's In the Next Room (or The Vibrator Play) was the winner of the Best New Play — Theatre Awards UK 2012 and nominated for three Tony Awards. The Ustinov Studio was also nominated for the prestigious Empty Space ... Peter Brook Award 2012. The Daily Telegraph's Dominic Cavendish praised the venue as a "constantly bubbling fount of marvels" at the awards ceremony. The Ustinov also received a second consecutive nomination for the 2013 awards.

In Autumn 2013, the Ustinov presented The Spanish Golden Age Season, three new translations of rarely seen plays. These included the tragedy Punishment without Revenge, and the romantic comedies Don Gil of the Green Breeches and A Lady of Little Sense, which ran in repertory with a cast of ten actors in all three plays between September and December 2013. It was later transferred to the Arcola Theatre.

In Summer 2014, the Ustinov Studio presented a new comedy, 'Bad Jews', and in November of the same year, a black comedy by Florian Zeller, 'The Father' starring Kenneth Cranham. Both of these plays have gone on to huge national and international success in following two years, running almost continuously on several tours and West End transfers, culminating in Kenneth Cranham winning the Olivier Award for Best Actor in a Play at the 2016 Awards Ceremony.

In January 2020, theatre and opera director Deborah Warner, was appointed Artistic Director of the Ustinov Studio. Her inaugural season in 2022 included successful productions of Shakespeare's The Tempest; Benjamin Britten's Phaedra; Purcell's Dido and Aeneas; Kim Brandstrup's new dance piece Minotaur and Dickie Beau's inventive Showmanism. 2023 sees an equal line up of productions. The season begins with THEATRE and a new production of Sophie Treadwell's Machinal from director Richard Jones. OPERA follows with Benjamin Britten's The Turn of the Screw directed by rising star Isabelle Kettle. Kim Brandstup's Minotaur returns in a DANCE double bill with a brand new work featuring ballet stars Matthew Ball, Alina Cojocaru, Kristen McNally and Tommy Franzen. The season continues with a yet to be announced new project conceived and directed by Deborah Warner. Finally, a new RECITAL strand is introduced which brings some important names in classical music including internationally renowned tenor Ian Bostridge, leading mezzo-soprano Christine Rice, acclaimed lyric soprano Sophie Bevan and master pianist Julius Drake.

=== The Egg ===
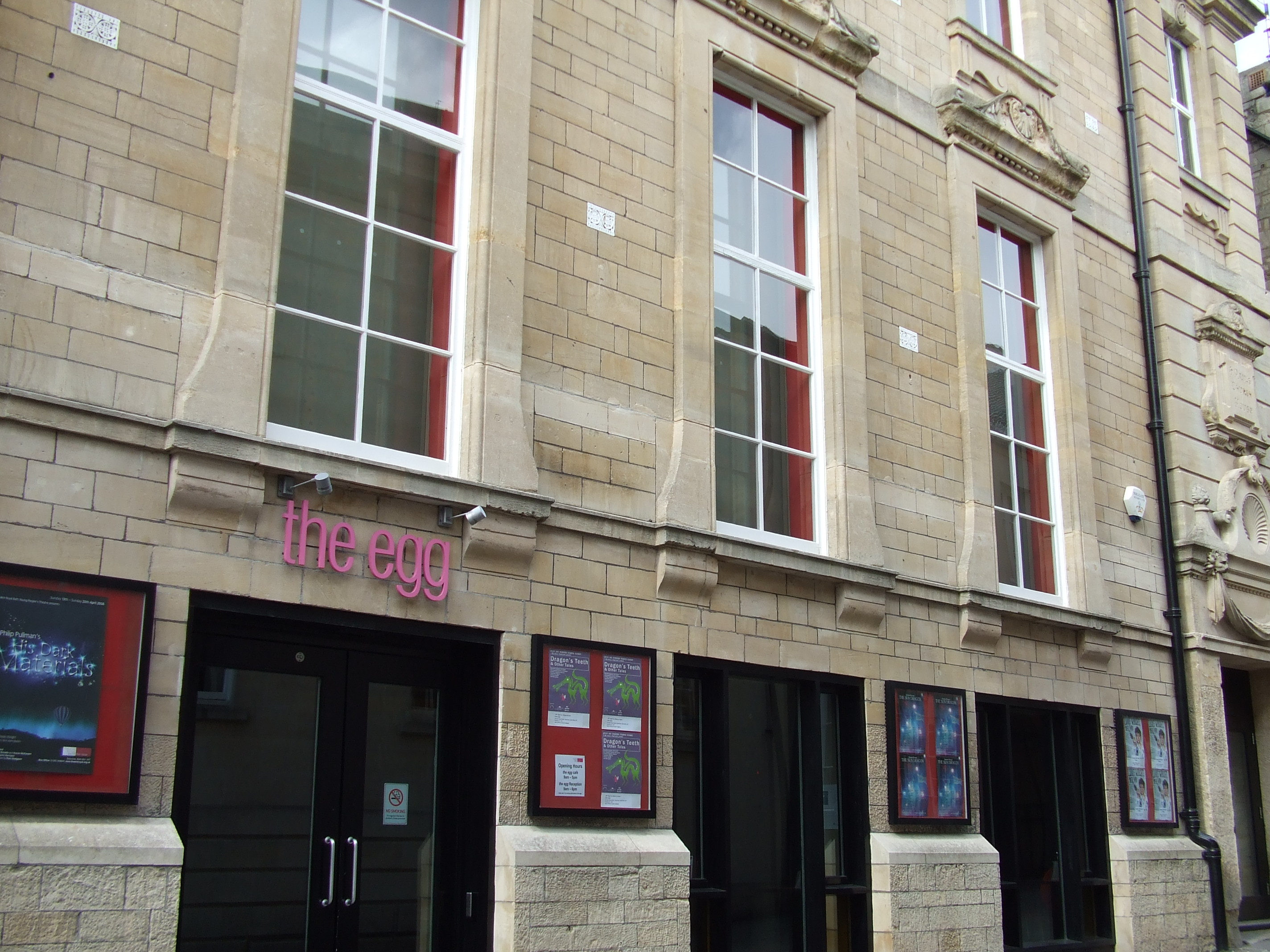
The front doors of The Egg

In 2005 another new theatre was opened behind the Theatre Royal, The Egg, which provides professional theatre productions for children and their families, alongside workshops and youth theatre productions. It includes a cafe, which is also the venue for children's and family events, and occasional teenage arts events.

== Performances ==
Alongside the weekly touring productions which make up most of its programme, the Theatre Royal hosts a Summer Season, curated by Jonathan Church. This followed on from the Peter Hall Company Season, which was held from 2003 until 2011. Many plays start at the Theatre Royal before their official opening in London.

== Bibliography ==
- Forsyth, Michael (2003). Pevsner Architectural Guides: Bath. Yale University Press. ISBN 978-0-300-10177-5.
- Gadd, David (1971). Georgian Summer. Bath: Adams & Dart Ltd. ISBN 978-0-239-00083-5.
- Haddon, John (1982). Portrait of Bath. London: Robert Hale. ISBN 978-0-7091-9883-3.
- Harris, John (2007). Moving Rooms. Yale University Press. ISBN 978-0-300-12420-0.
- Lowndes, William (1982). The Theatre Royal at Bath. Redcliffe. ISBN 978-0-905459-49-3.
- Marshall, Gail (2012). Shakespeare in the Nineteenth Century. Cambridge University Press. ISBN 978-0-521-51824-6.
- Swindells, Julia; Taylor, David Francis (2014). The Oxford Handbook of the Georgian Theatre 1737–1832. OUP. ISBN 978-0-19-960030-4.
