= Bluecoat School, Bath =

Bluecoat School
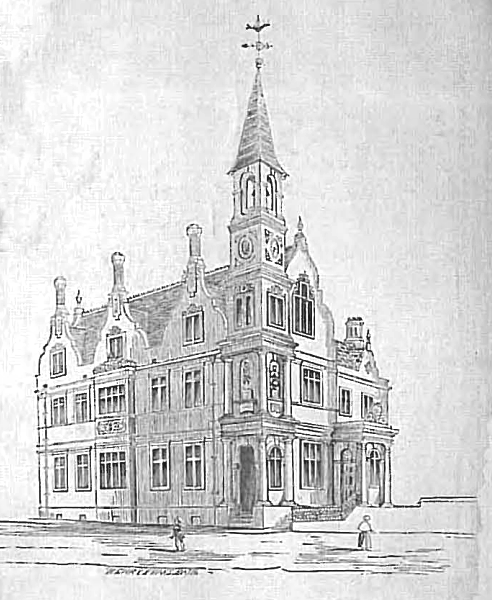
- 1856 drawing of the new school

Location
- Saw Close; Bath; United Kingdom; 51.382247°N 2.36208°W

Information
- Religious affiliation: Christian
- Denomination: Anglican
- Founded: 1711
- Founder: Robert Nelson
- Closed: 1921
- Gender: boys and girls
- Colour: Blue
- School fees: free
- Alumni: Benjamin Godwin

Bluecoat School was a former school in Sawclose in Bath, Somerset, England. The school was founded in 1711 and operated as a charity offering free education to Anglican boys and girls. The building, which was rebuilt in 1860, is now known as Bluecoat House.

== History ==
The school for fifty boys was opened 11 July 1711, and the girls school for fifty girls opened 21 December 1711. Robert Nelson established a public subscription to provide the funding. Nelson died three years later and a building was not started until 1722, using a design by William Killigrew.

Benjamin Godwin, who gained a place at the school in the 1790s because of his mother's Anglican connections, describes how the school supplied free education to 55 pupils. The children were supplied with all materials and uniforms.

Killigrew's building was demolished in 1859 and a new "Northern renaissance" style building was created. This development, by John Elkington Gill and the city architect George Phillips Manners, was part of a restyling of that part of the city. This building continued as a school. It was sold in 1921 and eventually was used by the local government for offices. The building was designated as Grade II listed in 1975. Today it is possible to rent an apartment in the building which is now called Bluecoat House.

The Sawclose immediately to the west of the building is a pedestrian-friendly shared space for pedestrians, cyclists and cars.
