= Christ Church, Bradford-on-Avon =

Church in Bradford-on-Avon, Wiltshire, England

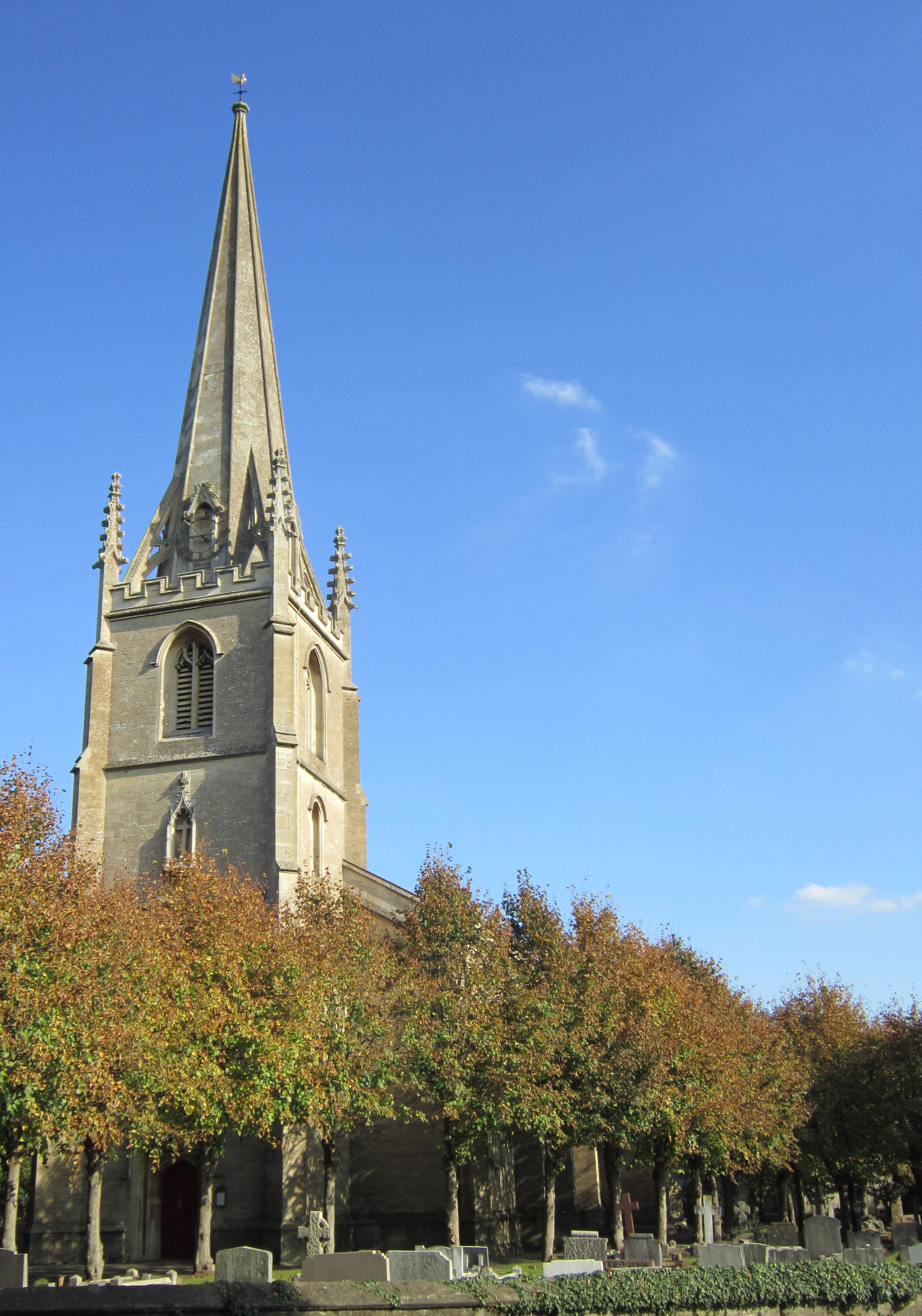
- Interactive map of the Christ Church, Bradford-on-Avon area

General information
- Architectural style: Victorian
- Location: Bradford-on-Avon, Wiltshire, England
- Coordinates: 51.351°N 2.249°W
- Completed: 1841

Technical details
- Structural system: Oolitic limestone masonry walls with iron clamps

Design and construction
- Architect: G. P. Manners

Listed Building – Grade II*
- Reference no.: 1036077

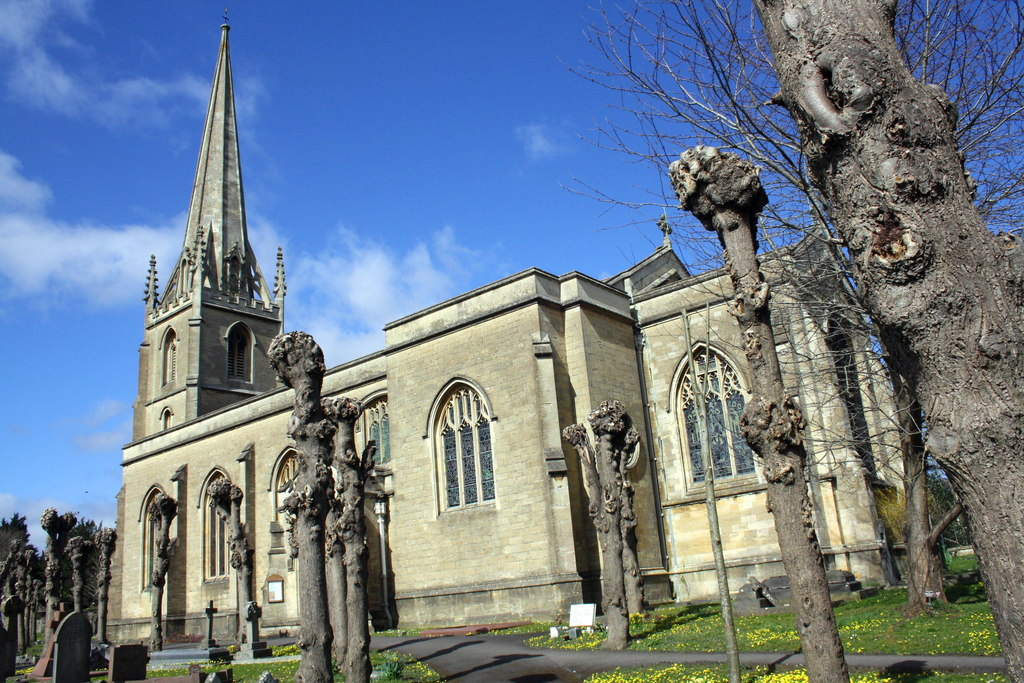
A view of the church in 2015

The Anglican Christ Church is in the northern Hillside Terraces district of Bradford-on-Avon, Wiltshire, England. It is in the Bradford Deanery of the Diocese of Salisbury.

Early in the 19th century, people in this area of town objected to going down the hill to the northern town centre to their parish church, the originally Norman church of Holy Trinity, which was considered to be "in a bad part of the town." The church was in need of repair and the nearby Saxon Church of St Lawrence across the road from Holy Trinity was yet to be discovered.

The new parish of Christ Church was created and a new structure was commissioned to be designed by Bath architect G. P. Manners in 1839. Consecrated in 1841, it was "originally...a simple design with plain walls, clear glass windows and stone flagged floors and was in the Perpendicular style." Later Victorian taste in churches was for something more elaborate, so in 1875 it was "restored" by Sir George Gilbert Scott; the east end was rebuilt, with an extra bay beyond the east wall to form a sanctuary. After Scott's death in 1878, interior work was overseen by his son John Oldrid Scott. Further work in 1884 included the addition of a south porch, and in 1919 C.E. Ponting added the south chapel as a war memorial to C. Eric Moulton.

The church has a ring of eight bells cast in 1923 by Gillett & Johnston of Croydon.

The church was designated as Grade II* listed in 1952. Nikolaus Pevsner describes it as a "big, prosperous church". Today the parish forms part of the North Bradford-on-Avon benefice.
