= Benjamin Godwin =

English clergyman and abolitionist

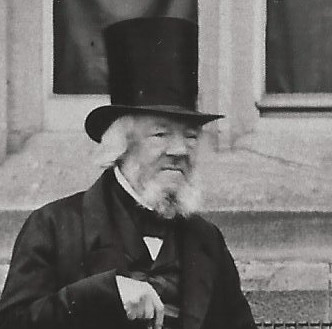
- from a photograph by his son
- Born: 10 October 1785; Bath
- Died: 20 February 1871 (aged 85); Bradford
- Spouse: Elizabeth

Reverend Benjamin Godwin (10 October 1785 – 20 February 1871) was a Baptist clergyman, abolitionist and activist. He was a pastor at Dartmouth, Great Missenden, Bradford, and Oxford as well as a teacher of classics. He became involved in debates on the ethics of slavery and a schism in the Baptist missionary community. Godwin's writing's are an interesting source as he wrote 58 letters to his son to record his autobiography. Godwin's son and his grandson were Mayors of Bradford.

== Life ==
Godwin was born on 10 October in Bath in 1785. His mother was about forty, but he was given the biblical name Benjamin because his father was 70 and a keen Baptist. His father had been married before and Benjamin had two adult siblings. His family were poor but he was sent to a Dame school until his education and upkeep was undertaken by the charity that ran the Bluecoat School in Bath This school was free and included the supply of uniforms. When Godwin finished school he was apprenticed to a shoemaker.

== Sailor ==
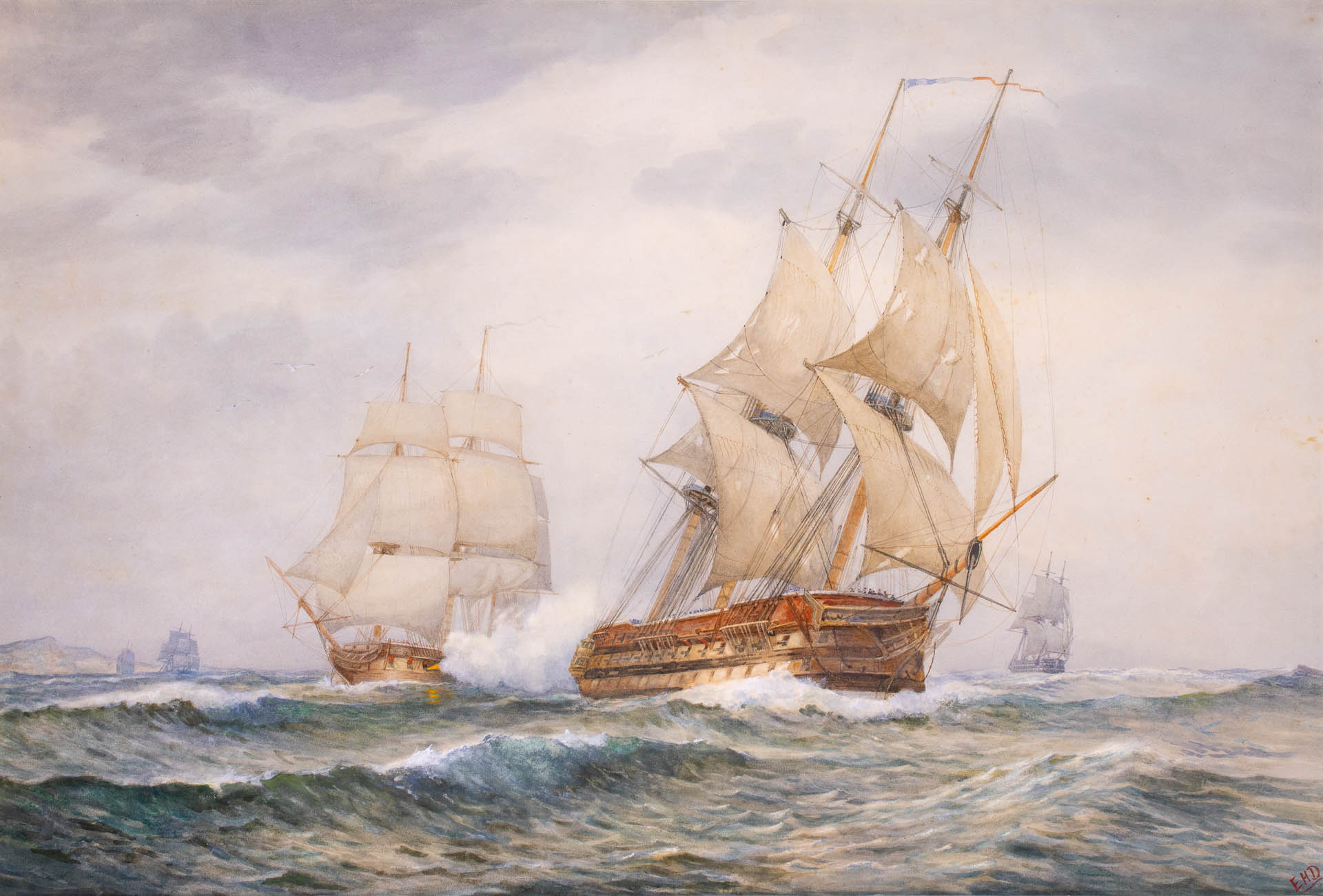
HMS Généreux (before the ship joined the Royal Navy and Godwin was in the crew.)

Godwin was unhappy during his apprenticeship and this resulted in the fifteen-year-old running away with a friend on a ship bound for the Mediterranean. During the journey Godwin reported that he gained a close relationship with his god. Godwin jumped ship in Palermo and he was able to find work as a cabin boy bound for London. However, in Menorca the whole crew of his ship was impressed into the Royal Navy on Godwin's 16th birthday, serving onboard the HMS Généreux. Godwin continued to serve in the British navy during the War of the Second Coalition until the Treaty of Amiens was signed. Godwin and the rest of crew were dismissed at Spithead on 27 July 1802.

== Cobbler and evangelist ==
Godwin renewed his religious interests attending his family's Baptist Church with his, much older, half-sister. He also lodged with his half sister and her husband. He initially tried his hand at building with his brother-in-law before realising that his poor skills as a cobbler were superior to his ability to be a builder. In line with the Baptist faith, Godwin confirmed his faith when he was baptised with five other adults. Through the church he met Elizabeth Hall, but she refused to marry him until he could support her. "Betsy" Hall was unimpressed by Godwin delivering a sermon, until he had given three successful sermons in Bath. Others were also impressed and Godwin was offered a part-time position as an evangelist at Aylburton in Gloucestershire. Betsy was satisfied and they were married on 14 August 1806 and they were given the use of a cottage in Aylburton. Here they set up a home and they established church meetings. Godwin was inspired by his wife who he regarded as "the name of a powerful spell". However, despite Godwin's efforts they were reduced to eating potatoes and drinking water and their evangelical mission came under active opposition. They had to contend with merciless persecution including eggs being thrown. Hearing that he had been mischievously drafted into the militia, Godwin left Aylburton in 1807.

Godwin was sure now that he wanted to be a minister and he was given a probationary year looking after a Cornish congregation at Chacewater. Here he was mentored by the nearby minister at Redruth. Betsy had to remain in Bath as the money was poor, but Godwin's was helping at the local school and completing his own education. It was Godwin who decided to leave when the year was completed to join his wife; and to become a minister.

== Minister ==
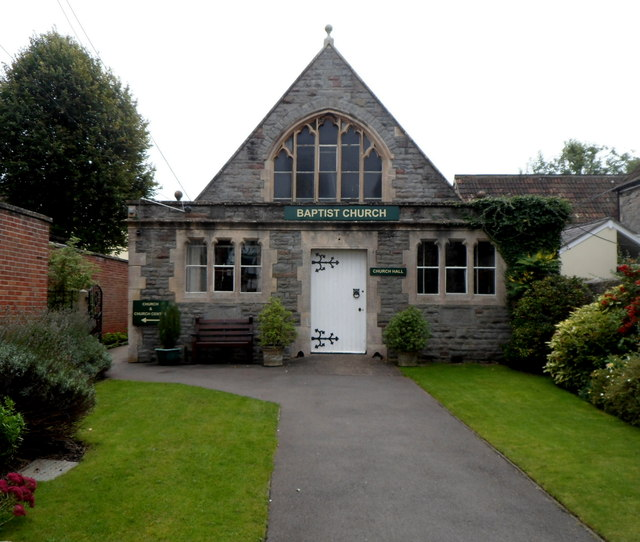
Chipping Sodbury Baptist Church

Godwin and Betsy spent a year at Chipping Sodbury, but he modestly refused an offer of becoming their pastor and took up another offer in Dartmouth where he could not only preach but also learn and teach. His ordination as a minister for Dartmouth was in 1812. Within his new congregation were Calvinistic Baptists who debated with Godwin and his Particular Baptist views. Godwin was a Baptist but gave his support to the evangelical ideas of Andrew Fuller and his Baptist Missionary Society. In Dartmouth, the Godwin's daughter, Mary, died of whooping cough, but they also had a son on 23 December 1814 who they named John Venimore Godwin. Godwin was ready to move.

Godwin became a minister at Great Missenden where he wrote the memoirs of the pastor he had replaced. He worked well with his Anglican counterpart raising money for missionary work, but he was disappointed to find that he was gaining some of his diminishing congregation. Godwin was paid well but the money failed to arrive on time.

== Tutor in Bradford ==
Godwin arrived at his new position in Bradford in 1822. Here he was employed as a teacher of classics by William Steadman who led the Horton Academy in Bradford. The academy was training Baptist ministers and Godwin had initially turned down an offer to join the staff. Steadman had persevered as he was impressed by Godwin's first published sermon. Horton Academy was teaching adults and Godwin was concerned that his education was not sufficient. This proved not to be the case and he enthusiastically introduced new classes in maths, physics and geography. Godwin was however not preaching.

== Minister and tutor in Bradford ==
In 1824 a new Sion Chapel was built in Bradford and Godwin became its minister on 31 October 1824 when he had the honour of Robert Hall giving a sermon. Godwin was pleased with the autonomy that this new position allowed him.

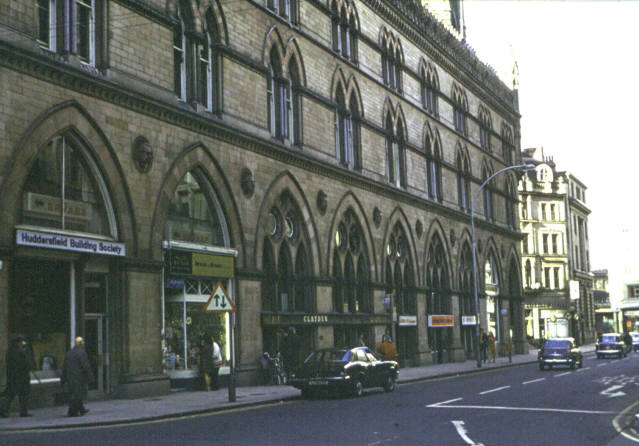
The Wool Exchange Building in Bradford

Godwin had now achieved his ambition. In 1830 Godwin launched himself on what he, and his wife, believed was their next challenge and that was to oppose slavery. After consulting the leading abolitionist James Stephen, he gave a series of well-attended talks at the newly built Bradford Exchange buildings. The lectures were given with an entrance fee of a shilling, but these were more than just a series of four plain lectures. Godwin had not only prepared transparencies he had also hired an artist to prepare large paintings that could illustrate the results of slavery. The young artist was called Thomas Richmond (and he may be this one). Godwin believed that the truth would make its own argument and he just needed to make sure that the information was presented and that it was accessible. Godwin wanted minds to be persuaded so he had Thomas Richmond prepare a second series of panels that illustrated the benefits of an egalitarian and multi-racial world that result from the abolition of slavery.

NO SLAVERY!

ELECTORS OF THE COUNTY OF YORK

You honourably distinguished yourselves

In the ABOLITION OF THE SLAVE TRADE

by your zealous support of

WILLIAM WILBERFORCE

Who can be more worthy of your choice as a

REPRESENTATIVE FOR THE COUNTY

the enlightened friend and champion of Negro Freedom

HENRY BROUGHAM

by returning him

YOU WILL DO AN HONOUR TO THE COUNTY

and

A SERVICE TO HUMANITY

Godwin and his talks would have been just the right kind of activity needed for the planned Bradford Mechanics' Institute Library. The new building was encouraged by Godwin and the new facility was designed to assist in adult education. It opened in 1832. Meanwhile, Godwin's abolitionist talks attracted wider attention and Zachary Macaulay who edited the Anti-Slavery Reporter invited him to arrange a series of talks around the country. The proposal was too ambitious, but Godwin did deliver the four illustrated lectures in York and Scarborough and the texts were summarised in the local papers. They were also published as a 170-page booklet in London and in Boston, Massachusetts (in 1836). Godwin arranged for a grand petition to be assembled in Yorkshire to persuade the British Anti-Slavery movement to be more active. John Hustler helped with travel expenses in order that he could lobby the next meeting of the British and Foreign Anti-Slavery Society in London. This was not successful but he did get to set forth his case with Zachary Macauley who led the organisation. Godwin also offered active assistance to Henry Brougham who was standing for parliament with an abolitionist agenda. Godwin wanted to help and he devised and funded posters that appealed to Yorkshire. Godwin knew that voters had supported the famous abolitionist William Wilberforce and he appealed to them to repeat their choice (and Godwin's) with the new candidate, Henry Brougham.

Godwin's four lectures had become a book that was rapidly out of print in London. Copies were sent to peers and members of parliament and speakers and agents for anti-slavery looked on Godwin's book as a standard work. Reader's included the international activists George Thompson and John Scoble. Scoble was the secretary of the British and Foreign Anti-Slavery Society.

By 1833 parliament was more democratic following the Reform Bill and the abolitionists wanted to ensure that their elected Members of Parliament voted to outlaw slavery. Petitions were again organised across Bradford and Godwin was one of the delegates sent to Exeter Hall in London to attend a meeting to organise the lobbying of parliament. The Slavery Abolition Act 1833 was passed and this made slavery illegal throughout the empire. On 24 April 1834 Godwin was awarded a testimonial dinner for his leadership during the anti-slavery campaign. He was given thanks and presents including tea sets and silver plate at a celebration that was attended by members from both houses of parliament.

In 1834 the Liberal Bradford Observer newspaper was formed by selling shares to ninety people. The idea for the newspaper had come from an informal book club that Godwin attended. Godwin was one of several people who led this initiative. He proposed that the newspaper needed to aim for a general appeal which meant that it should not exclusively champion the Liberal cause but should attempt to demonstrate the common interests of both employer and employees. The newspaper was a success and Godwin organised a local group to support parliamentary reform and another group against slavery. When Godwin became dissatisfied and he resigned his position in 1836 there was a campaign to raise money to keep him in Bradford. Godwin relented, but within a few months he again felt that he was not enjoying the support he deserved. He had given up his role at the Horton Academy to concentrate on his ministry but still he heard criticism. Godwin resigned again and despite having nowhere to go he did not give in to those who asked him to retract again.

== Peacemaker in Liverpool ==
Godwin was at a loose end and he became involved in a schism between the Baptist Missionary Society and the missionaries in charge of the mission to Serampore in India. Godwin and his wife moved to Liverpool where he was given £150 a year to be secretary to the committee set up to solve the problem. The latter organisers were known as the "Serampore Three". The ten-year-long schism arose because the mission at Serampore had been set up with a degree of independence from the main society. Following the death of long-serving and successful missionary society secretary Andrew Fuller it was decided to formalise the ownership. The new missionary society secretary required everything to be explained and documented. By this time the elder missionaries had in their ownership a number of buildings which they held in safe-keeping. Some saw that this could be interpreted as personal profit although no one made this accusation. The problem arose because these missionaries saw the request to transfer the ownership as a slur on their character.

Godwin's role was employed in Liverpool to talk his way around Britain explaining the misunderstandings that were in circulation and to try to arrange a visit to the splintered missionaries in India. Godwin acted outside his remit and he organised a difficult two-day meeting in November 1836 which agreed a merger between the two splintered groups. With no schism Godwin had no job. With a feeling of great success he was again out of work.

== Minister in Oxford ==
In 1838 Godwin became the Baptist minister in New Street Church in Oxford. In the March of that year he started the first of 58 autobiographical letters which he would continue to write until December 1855.

Godwin is shown below the main speaker's raised shoulder in the painting of the 1840 Anti-Slavery Convention. Move your cursor to identify him or click the icon to enlarge

During the 1840 World Anti-Slavery convention he prepared a paper on the ethics of slavery. The convention unanimously accepted his paper which condemned not only slavery but the religious leaders and communities who had failed to condemn the practise. The convention resolved to write to every religious leader to share this view. The convention called on every religious communities to eject any supporters of slavery from their midst.

Godwin was included in a large commemorative painting of the 1840 convention where he can just be seen behind the head of Joseph Sturge who organised the conference. The painting now hangs in the National Portrait Gallery. Godwin was meeting and mixing with the international anti-slavery activists. He was invited to meet French abolitionists in Paris the following year.

Godwin resigned his Oxford position in 1845 due to his failing health and the following year he and his wife returned to Bradford. They lived in a house that his son had organised. In 1847 his son was married. Godwin continued to work for the Baptist Missionary Society as well as lecturing at Horton College again in 1850. One of his latter successes was to become President of Bradford's Ragged School which opened with seven pupils in 1854. Another late honour was to be president of a newly formed Bradford female Anti-Slavery Society with his wife as secretary in 1856 and a committee of 24 women.

On 23 December 1855, on his son's birthday, Godwin presented to his son 58 autobiographic letters which he had agreed to write nearly twenty years before. These letters have been evaluated academically and they are considered to be a good source on Godwin's life and the debates and affairs that he was involved with.

Godwin died in 1871.

== Selected publications ==
- The Substance of a Course of Lectures on British Colonial Slavery: Delivered at Bradford, York and Scarborough, 1830
- Paper presented to the General Anti-Slavery Convention, 1840
- The Philosophy of Atheism Examined and Compared with Christianity. A course of popular lectures delivered at the Mechanics’ Institute, Bradford, on Sunday afternoons, in the winter of 1852-1853, 1853
