= Compton Bishop =

Village and civil parish in England

Coordinates: 51.295°N 2.869°W

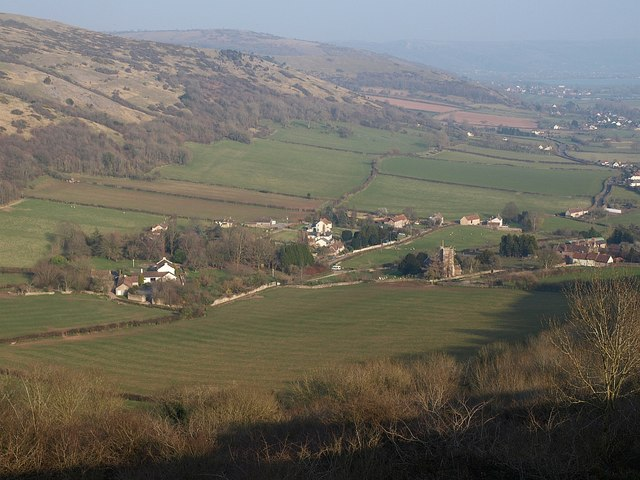
- Compton Bishop seen from the Mendip Hills

- Location within Somerset
- Population: 620 (2011)
- OS grid reference: ST395555
- Unitary authority: Somerset Council
- Ceremonial county: Somerset
- Region: South West
- Country: England
- Sovereign state: United Kingdom
- Post town: AXBRIDGE
- Postcode district: BS26
- Dialling code: 01934
- Police: Avon and Somerset
- Fire: Devon and Somerset
- Ambulance: South Western
- UK Parliament: Wells and Mendip Hills

Compton Bishop is a small village and civil parish, at the western end of the Mendip Hills in the English county of Somerset. It is located close to the historic town of Axbridge. Along with the village of Cross and the hamlets of Rackley and Webbington it forms the parish of Compton Bishop and Cross.

== History ==
It was listed in the Domesday Book of 1086 as Comtone. It was the property of Giso, Bishop of Wells. The parish was part of the Winterstoke Hundred. The current manor house is a Grade II listed building and was built in the early 17th century.

The parish includes the hamlet of Rackley which was a trading port on the River Axe in the Middle Ages following construction of a wharf in 1200. It now north of the River Axe as the course has been diverted, but on the Cheddar Yeo near the confluence. In 1324 Edward II confirmed it as a borough; however, by the end of the 14th century the port was in decline. In the 14th century a French ship sailed up the river and by 1388 Thomas Tanner from Wells used Rackley to export cloth and corn to Portugal, and received iron and salt in exchange. Later slate was imported through this route and it may have still be possible to trade through Rackley until the act of Parliament of 1915 authorising the drainage of the Axe and installation of the flood gate at Bleadon.

Also within the parish is the small village of Cross, where Wavering Down House was, for the last 20 years of his life, the home of the British comedian Frankie Howerd. The house is now a tourist attraction, and in the summer hosts concerts and opens regularly as a museum of Howerd's collection of memorabilia to raise fund for charities.

The name Webbington is believed to mean 'The weaving enclosure' from the Old English webbian and tun. Webbington is popular with hikers as it has many good footpaths leading up to Crook Peak and Shute Shelve, at the western edge of the Mendip Hills, and is part of the West Mendip Way route leading from Weston-super-Mare to Wells. The Webbington Hotel dominates the hamlet and is the only commercial building in the immediate area.

== Governance ==
The parish council has responsibility for local issues, including setting an annual precept (local rate) to cover the council's operating costs and producing annual accounts for public scrutiny. The parish council evaluates local planning applications and works with the local police, district council officers, and neighbourhood watch groups on matters of crime, security, and traffic. The parish council's role also includes initiating projects for the maintenance and repair of parish facilities, as well as consulting with the district council on the maintenance, repair, and improvement of highways, drainage, footpaths, public transport, and street cleaning. Conservation matters (including trees and listed buildings) and environmental issues are also the responsibility of the council.

For local government purposes, since 1 April 2023, the village comes under the unitary authority of Somerset Council. Prior to this, it was part of the non-metropolitan district of Sedgemoor, which was formed on 1 April 1974 under the Local Government Act 1972, having previously been part of Axbridge Rural District.

It is also part of the Wells and Mendip Hills county constituency represented in the House of Commons of the Parliament of the United Kingdom. It elects one Member of Parliament (MP) by the first past the post system of election, and was part of the South West England constituency of the European Parliament prior to Britain leaving the European Union in January 2020, which elected six MEPs using the d'Hondt method of party-list proportional representation.

== Religious sites ==
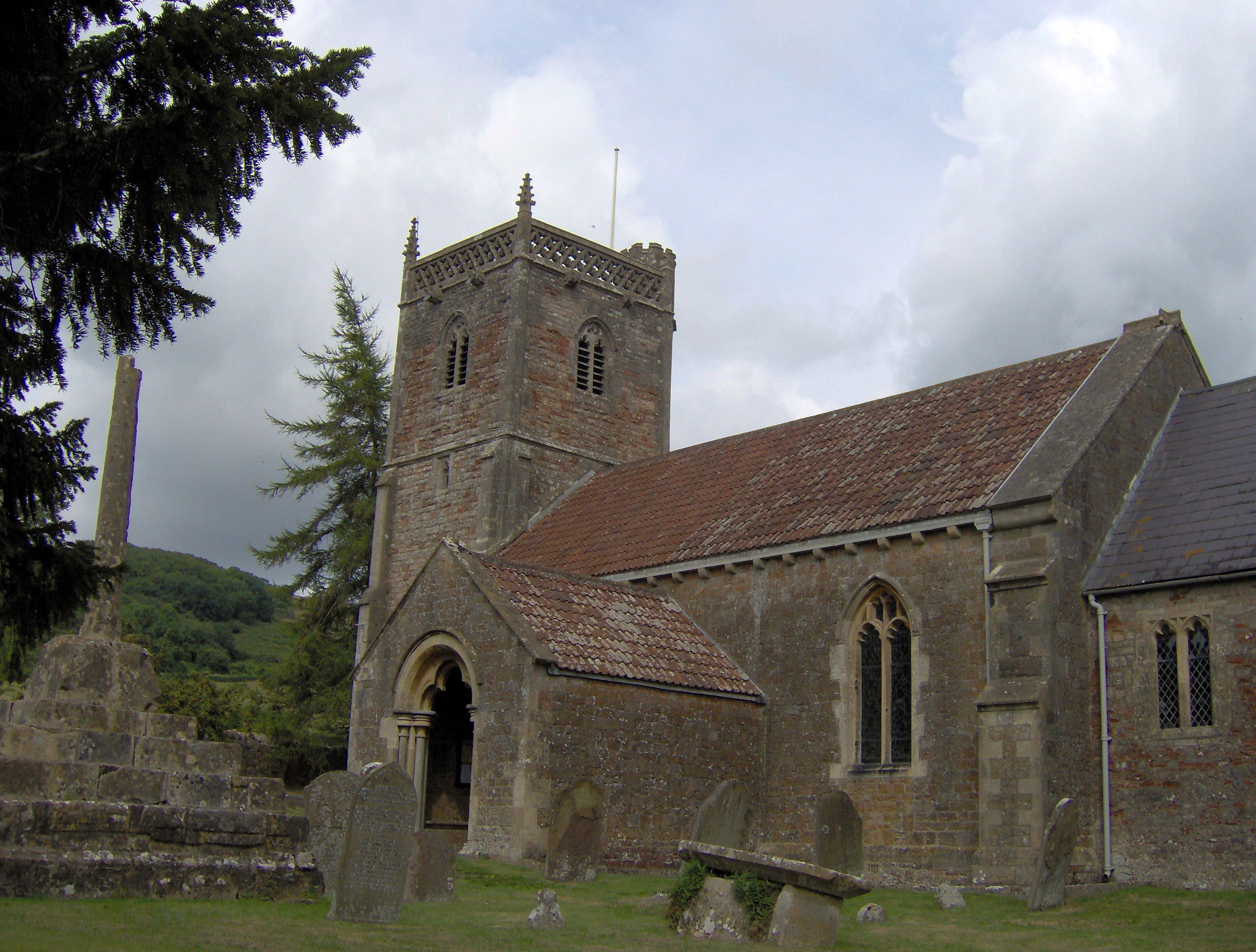
Compton Bishop Church

The Church of England parish church of St Andrew dates from the 13th century, being consecrated by Bishop Jocelin in 1236, with more recent restoration. It has a 15th-century pulpit with tracery panels, carved friezes and cresting. Above the pulpit is a large pedimented wall monument to John Prowse who died in 1688, as well as several of his children. It is a Grade I listed building. The churchyard cross is grade II listed, as are two chest tombs in the churchyard.

== Notable residents ==
- Frankie Howerd
