= St Thomas à Becket Church, Widcombe =

St Thomas à Beckett Church
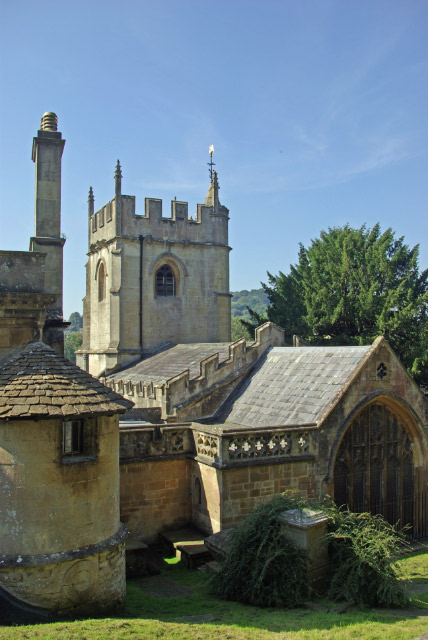
- St Thomas à Beckett Church
- 51.373425°N 2.346556°W
- Denomination: Church of England
- Website: https://widcombe.church

History
- Dedication: St Thomas Becket

Architecture
- Functional status: Parish church
- Heritage designation: Grade II*
- Architectural type: Church

Administration
- Diocese: Bath & Wells
- Archdeaconry: Bath
- Deanery: Bath
- Parish: Widcombe

St Thomas à Becket Church is a parish church of Widcombe in Bath, Somerset southwest England, and is one of a number of churches named after Thomas Becket. It is a Grade II* listed building.

== History ==
The church was built between 1490 and 1498 by John Cantlow, Prior of Bath Abbey and took the place of an older Norman church. However, there was a common tradition that a weaver was the founder of the church, and an escutcheon bearing a weaver's shuttle can be seen (Note: as of 1791) on the outside of one of the north battlements of the tower. It is believed that there was originally a Saxon chapel on the site. The church was commonly called Old Widcombe Church and used to be the principal church of the parishes of Widcombe and Lyncombe. The Domesday survey of 1086 shows a small settlement around the church although no trace of it remains.

In 1847 a much larger church, St Matthews, was built in Widcombe parish. On 22 April 1847, it was announced that the church bells, which had for centuries been in the tower of St. Thomas à Becket, were to be removed and installed in the new St. Matthew's. Legend has it that the bells were seized by force from the wardens of St Thomas's.

After the opening of St Matthews, closure of St Thomas à Becket was suggested due to its poor condition at the time. However funds were raised for refurbishment and in 1860 three windows were installed, the ceiling of the tower raised by 10ft, with further work being completed in the following years.

In 1889 a new organ by Messrs. Clark and Son of Bath was installed, and choir stalls placed in the chancel.

On 15 January 1924 what was believed to have been the first ever evening service was held at the church. Parish registers extending back centuries had revealed only morning service had been held there previously.

== Burials ==
- William Keasberry, 1797
- Bennet, family tomb 1700s

== See also ==
- List of ecclesiastical parishes in the Diocese of Bath and Wells
