= St Matthew's Church, Widcombe =

St. Matthew's Church
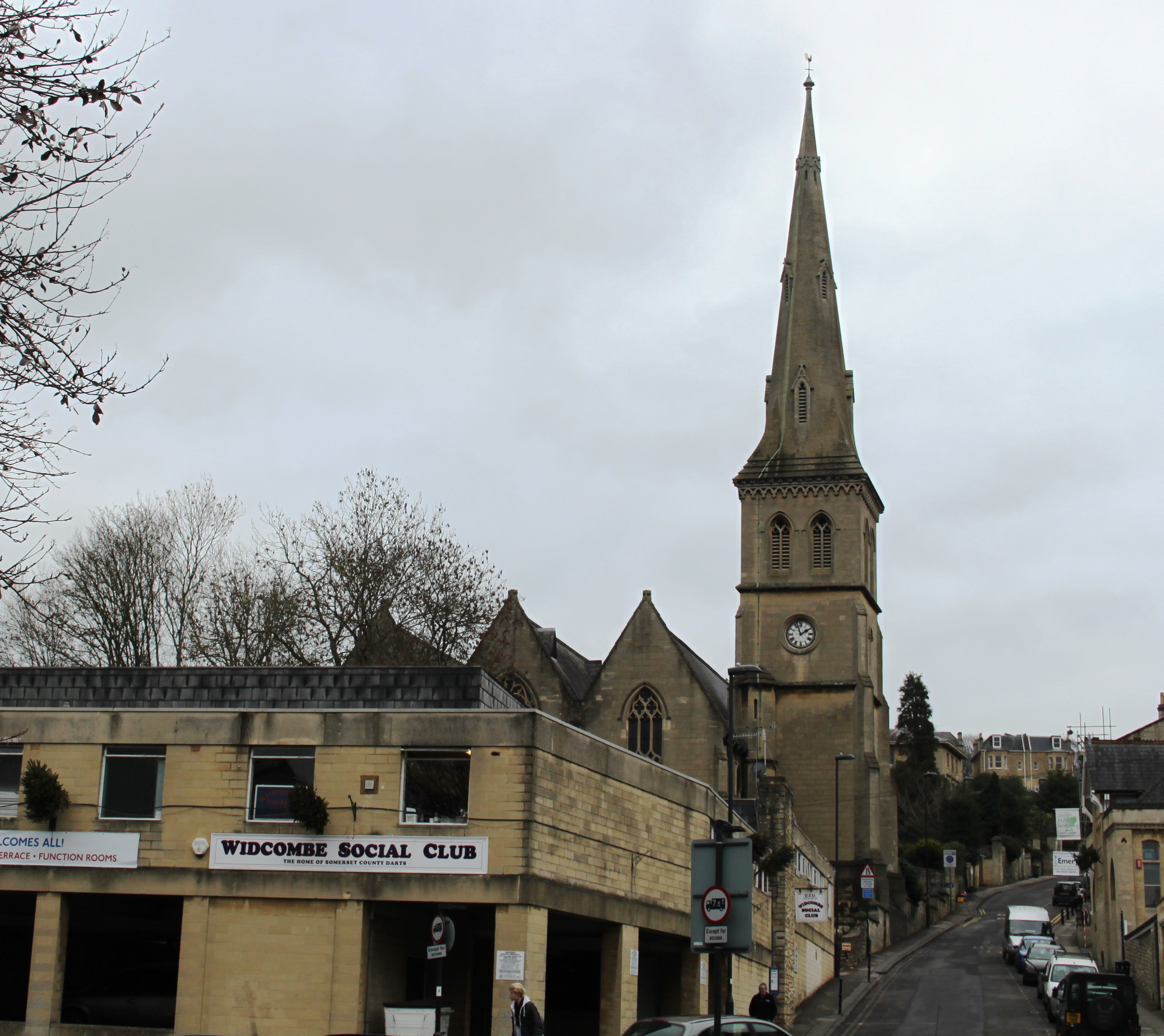
- Interactive map of the St. Matthew's Church area

General information
- Architectural style: Victorian architecture
- Location: Widcombe, Bath, England
- Coordinates: 51°22′35″N 2°21′7″W
- Construction started: 1846
- Completed: 1847

Technical details
- Structural system: Bath Stone masonry

Design and construction
- Architect: G. P. Manners

St Matthew's Church in Widcombe is an Anglican church on Cambridge Place in Widcombe, the southeastern area of Bath, Somerset, England. Built in 1846–1847 principally to designs by Bath City Architect George Phillips Manners, the church stands above the Widcombe Locks of the Kennet and Avon Canal and opposite the Church Room Institute on Cambridge Place. It is one of two churches in the parish of Widcombe, the other being the much older St Thomas à Becket.

The church is dismissively described by Nikolaus Pevsner in his Buildings of England guides as "St. Matthew, Cambridge Place, Widcombe. 1846–7 by Manners & Gill. Dull, in the Dec[orative] style, with a [south] tower carrying a broach spire." The tall spire has six bells, four of them predating the church; the oldest was made at Bristol in around 1500.

Refurbishment during the 1970s adapted the church for use as a parish hall and provided meeting rooms and venues for various community and church events.

In the summer of 2014 a newly planted congregation led by a new full-time Priest in Charge recommenced weekly worship service on Sunday evenings.
