= Old Orchard Street Theatre =

Theatre turned church turned Masonic Hall

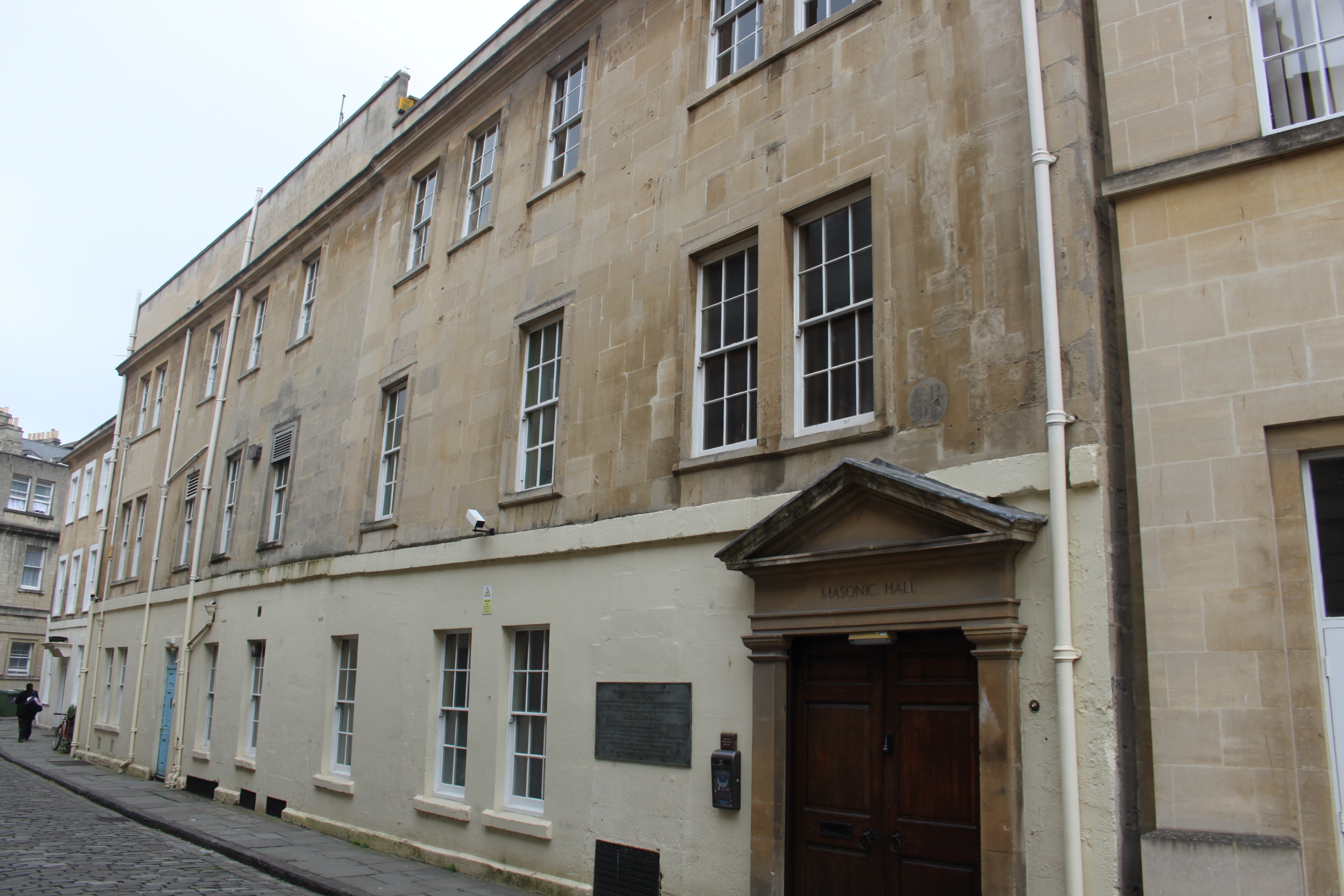

- Location within Somerset
- 51°22′48″N 2°21′28″W
- Location: Bath, Somerset, England

History
- Built: 1747-1750

Site notes
- Architect(s): Hippesley and Watts

Listed Building – Grade II
- Official name: Masonic Hall formerly Theatre
- Designated: 12 June 1950
- Reference no.: 1396228

Old Orchard Street Theatre in Bath, Somerset, England, was built as a provincial theatre before becoming a Roman Catholic church. Since 1865, it has been a Masonic Hall. It is a Grade II listed building.

== Theatre ==
In 1705 the first theatre opened in Bath. The building by George Trim was small and cramped and made little profit in the years before its demolition in 1738. The site it was on is now the Royal National Hospital for Rheumatic Diseases. A New Theatre opened in Kingsmead Street in 1723 and operated until 1751.

In 1747 John Hippisley proposed the construction of a new theatre and a revised version in 1748 just before his death. The planning was taken over by John Palmer, a local brewer and chandler, and Thomas Jelly. The site for a new theatre was chosen by John Wood, the Elder, who laid out much of the city, on the site of the old orchard of Bath Abbey. Construction work for the theatre in Old Orchard Street began in 1748, to designs by the architect Thomas Jolly of Hippesley and Watts, with the work being completed by John Powell in 1750. The theatre was 60 feet (18 m) long and 40 feet (12 m) board. The theatre, known as The St James Theatre, opened on 27 October, under the management of John Palmer, with a performance of William Shakespeare’s Henry IV, Part 2.

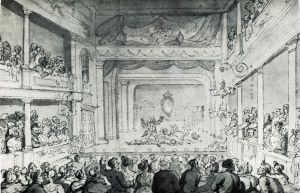
Old Orchard Street Theatre. Drawn by Thomas Rowlandson circa 1790

Palmer obtained a royal patent by the Bath Theatre Act 1768 (8 Geo. 3. c. 10) which enabled the use of the title 'Theatre Royal'; the first to achieve this outside London. He handed control to his son, also John Palmer who worked as his father's London agent, frequently travelling between London and Bath. Palmer also owned the Theatre Royal, King Street, in Bristol, which now houses the Bristol Old Vic. The two theatres shared one acting company, so Palmer had to move his actors, stagehands and props quickly between Bristol and Bath, he set up a coach service which provided safe, quick and efficient transport for his actors and materials. Later, when Palmer became involved in the Post Office, he believed that the coach service he had previously run between theatres could be utilised for a countrywide mail delivery service. He continued to manage the theatre until 1785 when he was appointed as Comptroller-General of the Post Office, and handed control to two existing members of the company, William Keasberry and William Wyatt Dimond. Keasberry (1726–1797) was associated with the theatre as actor and manager from 1757 to 1795, first acting as manager during the season of 1760.

In 1772 the young actor John Henderson joined the company and developed into a popular leading man before moving to theaters in London. Sarah Siddons joined the company between 1778 and 1782 and was among many leading actors of the day who performed at the theatre. During these years, the theatre performed an increasing number of plays written by women, and it has been suggested that this was due chiefly to the presence of Siddons in the company, as well as being related to the retirement of David Garrick. In 1791 Robert William Elliston made one of his earliest performances at the theatre.

The building was used as a theatre until 1805, when the present Theatre Royal opened. In the early years of the 19th century, Jane Austen was familiar with the theatre in Orchard Street, which is believed to be the original of that described in chapter 12 of Northanger Abbey.

== Catholic church ==
After four years standing empty the building was converted into a Roman Catholic chapel by the authorities of Prior Park and Downside Abbey and consecrated in 1809. The conversion involved the removal of the stage, gallery and boxes. It was adapted by Henry Goodridge.

After the Roman Catholic Relief Act 1829 removed many of the restrictions on Roman Catholics which had been introduced by the Act of Uniformity, the chapel became a church and was a site for the ordination of bishops, including Peter Augustine Baines. The vaults which had been used to store scenery was used to create stone tombs with 286 bodies being interred.

The congregation grew and in the 1850s and early 1860s a new St John's Church was designed and built by Charles Francis Hansom. In 1863 the congregation transferred to St John's Church and most of the bodies which had been in the vaults moved to a new churchyard.

== Masonic Hall ==
The building stood empty until 1866 when it and adjacent buildings in Pierrepont Place were acquired by the Masonic Royal Cumberland Lodge No. 53 for £636, to become their meeting hall.

The building was damaged during the Baedeker Blitz of 1942.

The hall is now the meeting place of eight Craft Lodges and 15 other Degrees.

It is also currently available for functions and is occasionally used for performances.

== Bibliography ==
- Lowndes, William (1982). The Theatre Royal at Bath. Redcliffe. ISBN 978-0905459493.
- O'Quinn, Daniel; Moody, Jane (2007). The Cambridge Companion to British Theatre, 1730-1830. Cambridge University Press. ISBN 978-0-521-61777-2.
- Gay, Penny (2006). Jane Austen and the Theatre. Cambridge University Press. ISBN 978-0-521-02484-6.
- Wilkinson, Tate; Larsen, Lyle (1998). Memoirs of his own life. Fairleigh Dickinson University Press. p. 231. ISBN 978-0-8386-3767-8.
