= William Wyatt Dimond =

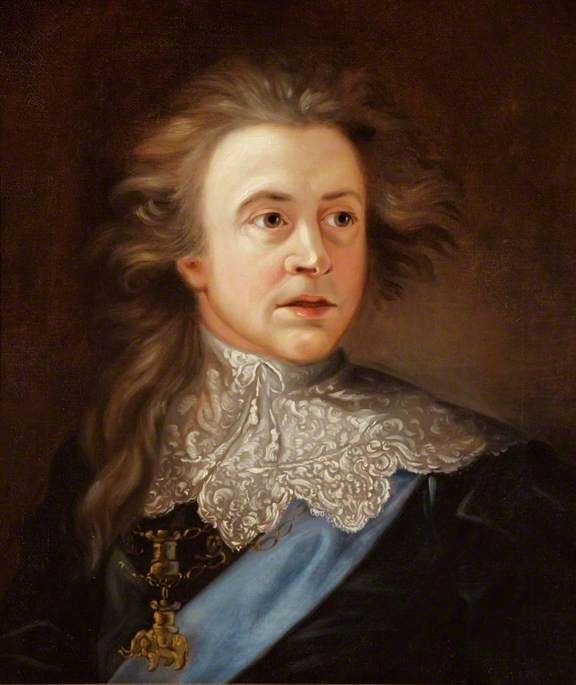
William Wyatt Dimond by Thomas Barker

William Wyatt Dimond (1750 – 2 January 1812) was an actor and theatre manager of the late 18th-century whose career was largely based in Bath in Somerset.

== Early career ==
The Monthly Mirror for May 1808 made a number of fanciful claims about the origin and childhood of Dimond, perhaps based on information supplied by Dimond himself; it claimed that he had been born in London and that while young his father had died leading his mother to remarry to a naval officer. It further added that Dimond had been sent as a boarder to Richmond Grammar School where he received the rudiments of a classical education and where he remained until the age of 15 when it was claimed a commission was purchased for him in the British Army. The Monthly Mirror stated that his mother not wishing him to go with his regiment to the West Indies she persuaded him to resign his commission. Dimond was then apprenticed as a chaser, the artist William Hogarth having served a similar apprenticeship about 50 years before. But where Hogarth was content to paint actors Dimond was determined to be one. According to the actor-manager Tate Wilkinson, Dimond's good manners and easy-going personality gave him the attitude of a gentleman and he resolved for a career on the stage. His first known theatrical appearance was made anonymously as a 'Young Gentleman, first appearance on any stage' when claiming to be aged 19 he played Romeo in Romeo and Juliet opposite Miss Mansell as Juliet at the Theatre Royal, Drury Lane on 1 October 1772. He again appeared anonymously as 'A Young Gentleman who played Romeo' when he appeared as Dorilas in Mérope in January 1973. When he and Miss Mansell shared a benefit performance in May 1773 he played Moneses in Tamerlane. In his diary the theatre's prompter William Hopkins wrote of Dimond 'He is very young a Smart Figure good Voice and made a very tolerable first appearance he met with great applause'. While remaining at Drury Lane for the rest of the season he only appeared on stage for five more nights. While in Canterbury in the summer of 1773 Dimond took on a managerial role at the "Theatre over the butter market" before returning to Drury Lane to appear in minor roles in Garrick's company during the 1773–4 season, his most successful roles being Rovewell in Shadwell's The Fair Quaker, Radwell in A Christmas Tale, Lorenzo in The Heroine of the Cave and The Dauphin in King John. For his benefit in May 1774 Dimond played Florizel in Florizel and Perdita adapted by Garrick from Shakespeare's The Winter's Tale. In August 1774 Dimond was acting in Birmingham while in July 1775 he was at the Haymarket Theatre in London appearing in Eldred, a new play.

== Move to Bath ==
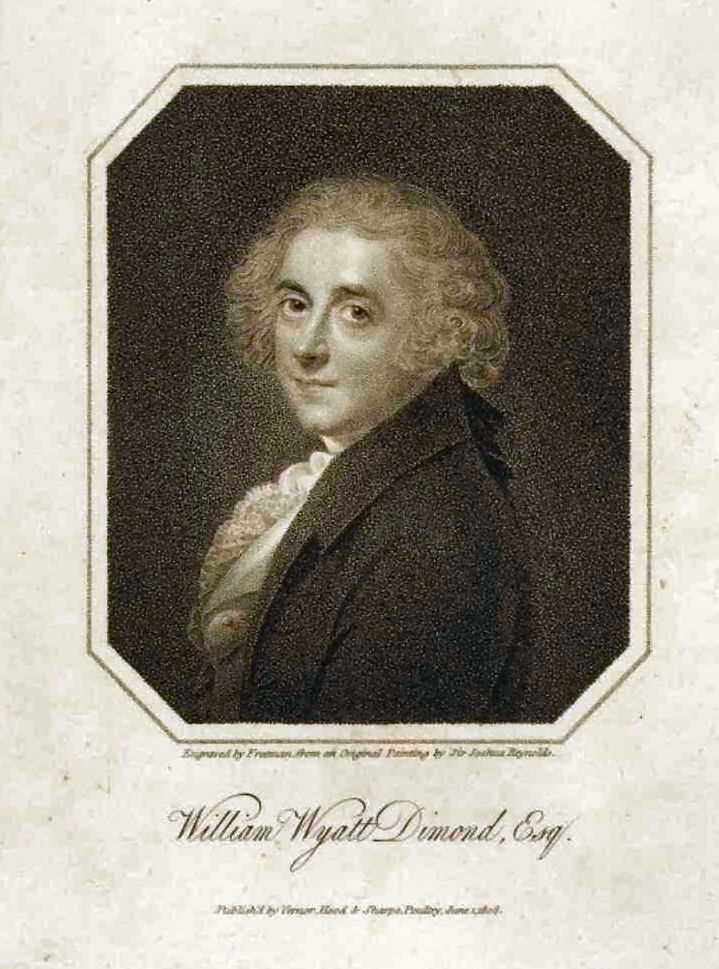
William Wyatt Dimond - print after a portrait by Joshua Reynolds

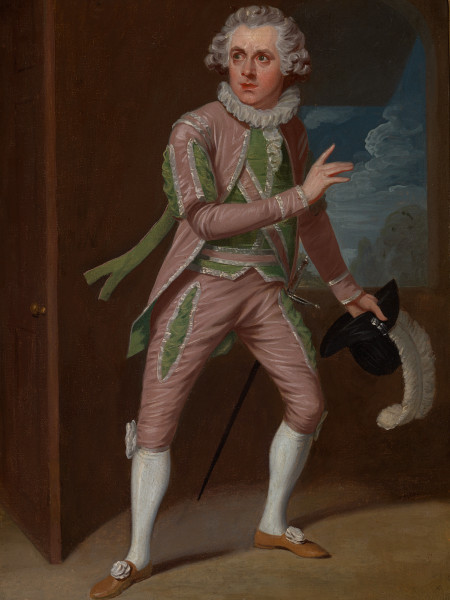
Dimond as Don Felix in Susanna Centlivre's The Wonder; A Woman Keeps a Secret - painted by Samuel De Wilde c1792

Dimond could not have realised when he made his first visit to the Theatre Royal, Bath in the summer of 1774 that he would be associated with Bath for the next 30 years. He returned to Bath in October 1774 to play a minor role opposite John Henderson in Richard III at the Old Orchard Street Theatre. By this time Bath had become perhaps the most fashionable of the rapidly developing British spa towns, attracting many notable visitors and the Orchard Street theatre being too small to accommodate all who wished to see performances it was expanded to double its capacity by its managers. When Dimond returned for the 1775–6 season he was at last able to play the leading roles he had desired, especially after Henderson went to London in 1777. From 1779 to 1782 Dimond acted opposite Sarah Siddons, playing Jaffier to her Belvidera in Otway's Venice Preserv'd, Posthumus to her Imogen in Cymbeline, Bassanio to her Portia in The Merchant of Venice, and Lord Townly to her Lady Townly in The Provoked Husband (1728), an unfinished fragment by John Vanbrugh reworked and completed by Colly Cibber.

Dimond was particularly effective in society comedies such as The Provoked Husband which gave him the opportunity to wear fashionable and extravagant costumes that showed off his graceful body to his audiences. Sheridan considered Dimond's Joseph Surface in The School for Scandal: 'more consonant to his own ideas when he wrote the part, than anybody else'. However, Dimond also continued to play tragic roles including Romeo in 1790 and Hamlet in both Bath and Bristol. Just before his retirement from acting the Bristol Journal gave an appreciation of his skills in comic roles but added that his performances in tragedy were too orderly: 'nothing is irregular, nothing is left to chance. ... Hence it is, that if you have little to excite astonishment, you have a great deal to admire'.

By now a resident of Bath in Somerset, on 2 December 1779 at Westminster in London (and claiming to be 22 years old) he married Matilda Martha Baker (1757-1823), a Norfolk woman of independent means, and their three known children were born and raised in Bath. The elder son, William Dimond, became a "prolific playwright of little quality and a theatrical manager of little more." William Wyatt Dimond's opportunity to manage the theatre in Bath came in 1786 when John Palmer, who acted as his father's London agent and frequently had to travel between London and Bath. Palmer also owned the Theatre Royal in Bristol, which now houses the Bristol Old Vic. The two theatres shared one acting company, so as Palmer had to move his actors, stagehands and props quickly between Bristol and Bath he set up a coach service which provided safe, quick and efficient transport for his actors and materials. Later, when Palmer became involved in the Post Office, he believed that the coach service he had previously run between theatres could be utilised for a countrywide mail delivery service. He continued to manage the theatre until 1785 when he was appointed as Comptroller-General of the Post Office, and handed control to two existing members of the company, William Keasberry and Dimond. As a theatre manager Dimond was extremely popular with everyone - not only with the directors but also with the public and the actors.

== Later years ==
Dimond made his farewell performance in Bristol on 1 July 1801 as Edgar in Nahum Tate's The History of King Lear, but he continued in theatre management until his death having been granted a 17-year lease on the Old Orchard Street Theatre in 1799. Probably his greatest achievement was the building of the Theatre Royal, Bath. Opening on 12 October 1805 with a lacklustre performance of Richard III but Dimond was successful in persuading notable actors from London to make the long journey to Bath, including Sarah Siddons in her final tour in 1811, Dorothea Jordan, George Frederick Cooke, Robert William Elliston, Joseph Shepherd Munden, Charles Kemble and John Bannister. At the height of his success as a manager Dimond suffered a stroke on 24 December 1811, and died at his home in Norfolk Crescent on 2 January 1812. The Bath Herald and The Literary Panorama state that he was aged 62 at the time of his death, which conflicts with the statement that he was 19 in 1773. In his will he bequeathed his property and theatrical interests to his widow. From her their son William Dimond obtained the management of the Theatre Royal, Bath which he gave up on her death in 1823.
