= William Keasberry =

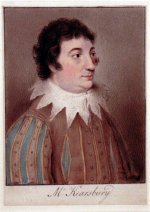
William Keasberry c. 1775

William Keasberry (1726 – 15 November 1797), sometimes spelt Keasbury, was an English actor and theatre manager of the 18th century whose career was chiefly in Bath, Somerset.

== Life ==
The son of another William Keasberry, by his marriage to Catherine Liddell, he was born in London.

Keasberry was "brought up to the china business in London", but took instead to "the more alluring profession of the stage". He joined the Edinburgh theatre in 1755, and from 1757 to 1795 was associated with the Orchard Street Theatre, Bath, as both actor and manager, taking over as manager in 1760, Outside Bath, he also acted in Bristol, London, and Richmond. a role he shared with William Wyatt Dimond.

In 1760, Keasberry and Richard Griffith established a temporary theatre at Winchester "in consequence of a Camp consisting of eight regiments".

On 30 August 1773, at New Brentford, Middlesex, Keasberry married Henrietta Hamilton (1737–1812), a member of an Irish family of actors. Her mother was Sarah Hamilton. They had several children, William (1760–1797), John Palmer (1773–1840), Catherine Liddell (1763–1845), Henrietta (1768–1797), Julia Maria (1769–1849), and Henry Edward (1771–1847).

At the time of his death, Keasberry was described in a brief obituary as "Mr. William Keasbury, in his 71st year, formerly an actor, and late one of the joint patentees and managers of the Bath Theatre."

He was buried at St Thomas à Becket's church, Widcombe, Bath.
