= Bradford Mechanics' Institute Library =

Technical library in Bradford, England

Coordinates: 53.79407°N 1.75594°W

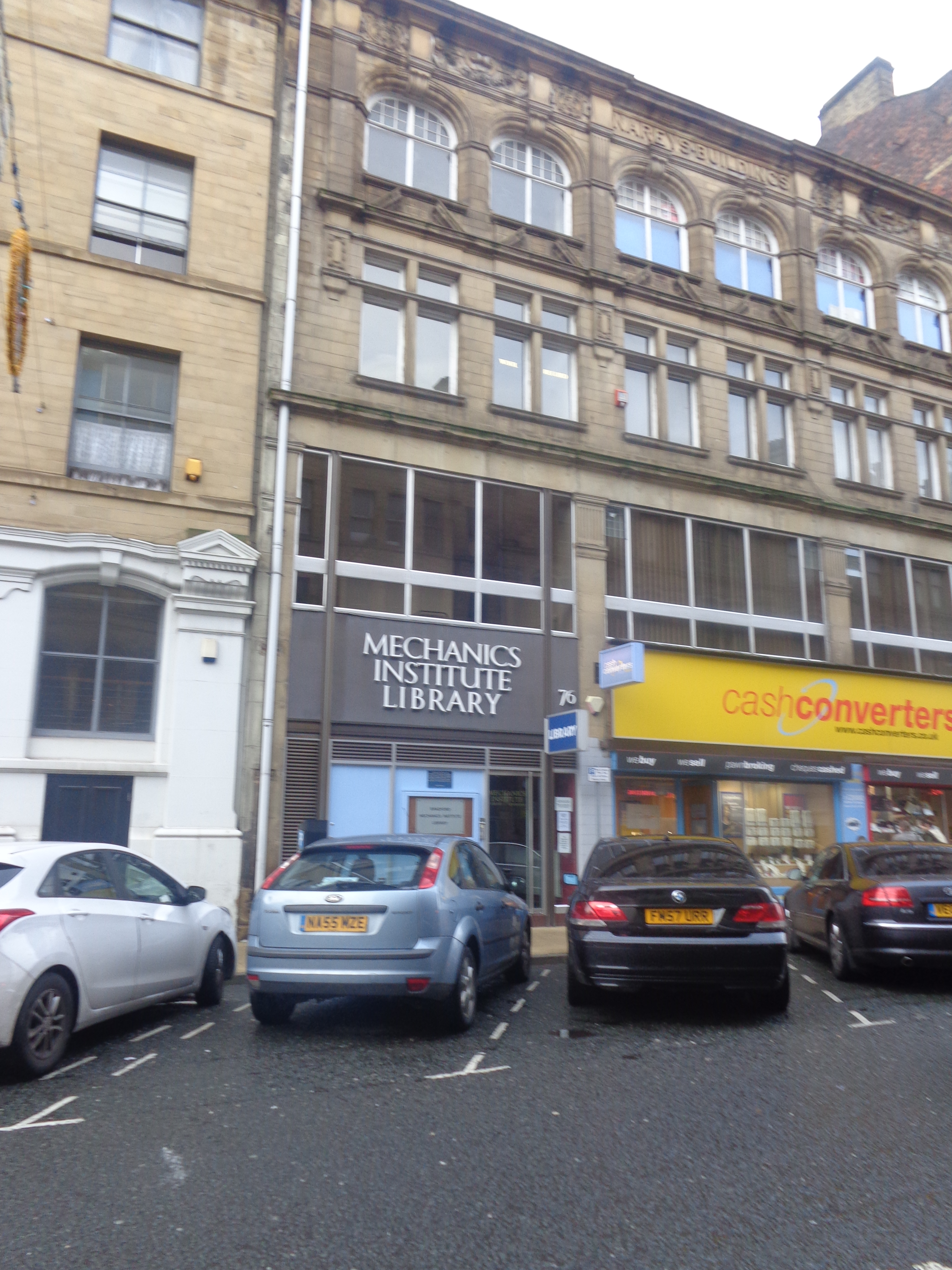
The Mechanics' Institute Library on Kirkgate, Bradford

The Bradford Mechanics' Institute Library was established in Bradford, England, in 1832 as part of a national initiative to provide adult education especially in technical subjects for working men. The institute in Bradford was supported by numerous local worthies, including James Hanson after whom is named one of Bradford's largest high schools.

== 19th century ==
The institute library was established in 1832 helped by James Hanson, Benjamin Godwin and others. These included members of the local artistic community such as the Bradford-born artist William Overend Geller (1804–1881). Sufficient funds were raised for a building at the junction of Leeds Road and Vicar Lane. The Mechanics' Institute played a leading role in adult education in Bradford, providing books, classes and later, a series of very popular public lectures over a century.

As an international centre of the worsted cloth industry there was a huge demand in Bradford for education in technical and commercial subjects, chemistry (for the dyeing industry), building construction and industrial art and design. Modern languages teaching was also important: it was said that on the Bradford Wool Exchange it was possible to hear every European language on any morning of the week.

The Bradford Observer happily declared that the "Mechanics' Institute was the body best adapted and most likely to afford technical education so desirable in an industrial town like ours."

In 1871 the Bradford MP, the Rt Hon W.E. Forster, opened the magnificent new building in Bridge Street, opposite the steps of Bradford Town Hall. With shops and a newsroom at street level, a large library above surrounded by teaching rooms which could accommodate 700 students, a lecture theatre with raked seating for 1,500 people and, on the upper floor, an elegant restaurant. This building was to become a Bradford landmark for the next hundred years, providing a thriving intellectual and social centre in the very heart of the city of Bradford.

William Forster's Elementary Education Act 1870 (33 & 34 Vict. c. 75) had created local school boards throughout the country. Ironically, the spread of state-provided education which followed Forster's Elementary Education Act 1870 led to the Education Act 1902 which empowered local authorities to co-ordinate the work of the various educational bodies in its area. In 1904 it was agreed that all classes at the Bradford Mechanics' Institute should be transferred to the control of the local council through the recently established Bradford Technical College. The teaching rooms of the building were let to the city council for classes over-flowing from the college but, effectively, the Mechanics' Institute had lost its role as a provider of formal education.

== 20th century ==
The Mechanics' Institute continued to attract the full cross section of Bradford society from clerks and engineers to merchants and wool barons. It is said that, at the turn of the century, there were more Rolls-Royce owners in Bradford than any other city in the country and ladies could be seen arriving by chauffeured cars to take coffee or luncheon whilst their gentlemen would spend time in the smoking and reading rooms of the institute or on the trading floor of the nearby Wool Exchange.

In the early years of the 20th century there were attempts to develop a social side to the institute. Clubs for chess and rambling were formed and a reading circle was established. In 1909 a conversazione with entertainment and music attracted an audience of 700 and the long-established public lectures continued to flourish. The 40 lectures given in 1908 were on topics as diverse as Himalayan Jungle Trek, Parliament from the Press Gallery and The Humour of a Parson's Life. On the outbreak of war in 1914 a recruiting station with a room for medical examinations were established at street level, a practice repeated in 1939. It was here that men enlisted for the famous Bradford Pals battalions of the West Yorkshire Regiment.

When the institute celebrated its centenary in 1932 the Archbishop of York gave the address and the Earl of Harewood took the chair. However, membership began to fall in the 1930s especially as interest from the younger generation waned. Rents from ground floor shops and the letting of meeting rooms kept the institute financially solvent but the outbreak of war in 1939 led to harder times. Blackout restrictions kept people at home, many societies ceased to function and the loss of room hire fees was a blow. Membership declined even further and by 1968 stood at 268 compared with over 1,700 members in 1899. Despite the continued meetings of the Bradford Historical and Antiquarian and the Bradford Scientific Societies and the letting of rooms for magistrates' courts, public examinations and religious meetings the leaders of the Institute realised that the position was unsustainable.

In the late 1960s Bradford Corporation declared its intention to reorganise the buildings within the area of Bradford City Hall. As the Mechanics' Institute was a Grade II listed building, application had to be made to the secretary of state, Geoffrey Rippon. This was granted in 1970, and in spite of public protests, by 1976 the magnificent Bridge Street building had disappeared and the Bradford Mechanics' Institute Library was installed in its present more modern premises at Narey's Buildings, 76 Kirkgate, Bradford.

== Mechanics' Institute today ==
Today the institute offers rooms for hire, accommodating from 12 to 50 people with catering facilities, Wi-Fi and the usual digital facilities. It continues to function as a subscription library and is stocked with over 14,000 books and media resources available on loan. The majority of the titles are fiction although there is a particularly good stock of books on specialist subjects, such as both world wars, local history and poetry. There is very little on dyeing, spinning and weaving cloth or the languages needed for trading on the floor of the wool exchange.

Library members can also attend the meetings of a range of interest groups which meet regularly in the library's reading room and second floor J. B. Priestley Room. Regular social events and the regular newsletter enhance the benefits which members enjoy.

The Mechanics' Institute Library is a charitable organisation and a member of the Association of Independent Libraries. The institute continues to fulfil its objectives of the advancement of education of the inhabitants of the district of Bradford, and the provision of a library and facilities for study, and a room to be used for meetings and lectures.

== Interest groups ==
Bradford Mechanics' Institute Library hosts a number of interest groups, including;

- Bradford Group (local history)
- Book Worms
- Bridge Group
- Poetry Group
- Bradford WW1 Group
