= George Phillips Manners =

British architect (1789–1866)

George Phillips Manners (1789 – 28 November 1866) was a British architect, who was Bath City Architect from 1823 to 1862.

In his early career, he worked with Charles Harcourt Masters, and after about 1845 was in partnership with J. E. Gill. He retired in 1862.

== Architectural practice ==
The architectural practice bore the following names (compiled by Michael Forsyth in Pevsner Architectural Guide: Bath, 2003):

- George Phillips Manners: 1820–1845
- Manners & Gill: 1845–1866 (with John Elkington Gill)
- John Elkington Gill: 1866–1874
- Gill & Browne: 1874–1879 (with Thomas Browne)
- Browne & Gill: 1879–1899 (with Wallace Gill)
- Gill & Morris: 1899–1903
- Wallace Gill: 1903–1909
- Mowbray A. Green: 1909–1914
- Mowbray A. Green & Hollier: 1914–1947
- Frank W. Beresford-Smith: from 1947 (later acquired by Beresford-Smith’s son)

From 1846 to 1909, the practice had its offices at No. 1 Fountain Building.

== Works ==
His works include a number of churches, initially in Perpendicular or Norman style, latterly in Gothic.

Churches in and around Bath:

- Bath Abbey, restoration (his additions were later removed by Sir Gilbert Scott)
- St Michael's Church, Broad Street (1836)
- St Michael's Church, Twerton (1839)
- Catholic Apostolic Church, now Guinea Lane Nursery (1840)
- Bath Abbey Cemetery Mortuary Chapel, Widcombe (1844)
- St Matthew's, Widcombe (1846–1847)

Churches elsewhere:

- Holy Trinity Church, Godney, Somerset (1838)
- Christ Church, Bradford-on-Avon, Wiltshire (1839) (again, his work was remodelled to lose its integrity by Sir G. G. Scott)
- Church Of Holy Trinity, Cleeve, Somerset (1840)
- Holy Trinity Church, Clandown, Somerset (1846–1847)
- St Paul's Church, Tiverton, Devon (1854–1856)

Other designs include:

- Obelisk (Victoria Column) to commemorate the coming-of-age of Princess Victoria, Royal Victoria Park, Bath (1837)
- Bath City Gaol (1843) in East Twerton (often referred to as Twerton Gaol)
- Rectory, Kingston Deverill, Wiltshire, remodelling (1858)
- Bluecoat School, Bath (1859–1860) (now in residential use)

| Preceded by ? | Bath City Architect; 1823–1862 | Succeeded by John Elkington Gill |

| Preceded by John Lowder | Bath City Surveyor; 1823–1862 | Succeeded by John Elkington Gill |
