= John Elkington Gill =

British architect (1821–1874)

- Born: 1821
- Died: 1874
- Known for: Architect

John Elkington Gill (1821–1874) was a 19th-century architect in Bath, Somerset, England.

== Life ==
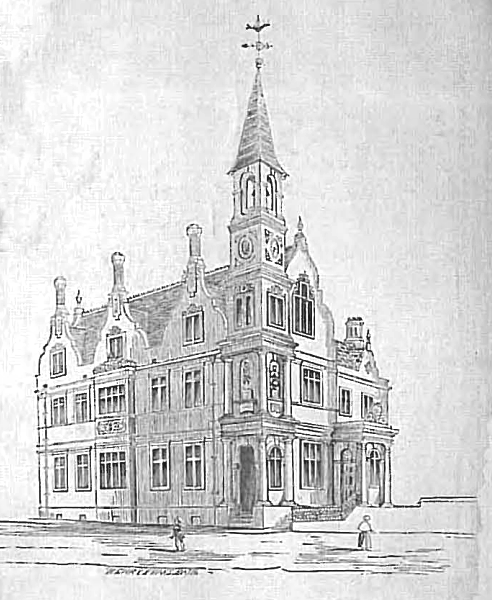
The former Bluecoat School in Bath is credited to Gill and Manners.

Gill was born in 1821. He was partnered in the firm Manners and Gill with the more famous George Phillips Manners. Gill continued the latter's practice upon Manners' retirement in 1862. On Manners' death in 1866, he changed the name of the practice to his name alone. He set up the practice of Gill & Browne in 1874 before he died, but he was then mostly retired and the work of Gill & Brown is almost entirely the work of Thomas Browne alone.

Gill lived at 7, Mount Beacon, Bath, from the 1860s.

John Elkington Gill's son was Wallace Gill, who in 1879 had his name added to the practice and in 1899 renamed the practice Gill & Morris. Wallace Gill went by his own name from 1903 and retired in 1909, transferring the practice to Mowbray A. Green.

== Architectural practice ==
The architectural practice of George Phillips Manners from the early 19th century into the mid 20th century (compiled by Michael Forsyth):

- George Phillips Manners: 1820–1845
- Manners & Gill: 1845–1866
- John Elkington Gill: 1866–1874
- Gill & Browne 1874–1879
- Browne & Gill: 1879–1899
- Gill & Morris: 1899–1903
- Wallace Gill: 1903–1909
- Mowbray A. Green: 1909–1914
- Mowbray A. Green & Hollier: 1914–1947
- Frank W. Beresford-Smith: 1947– (and later acquired by Beresford-Smith's son)

From 1846 to 1909, the practice office was at No. 1, Fountain Building.
