= Keynsham Abbey =

Former monastic abbey in Keynsham, England

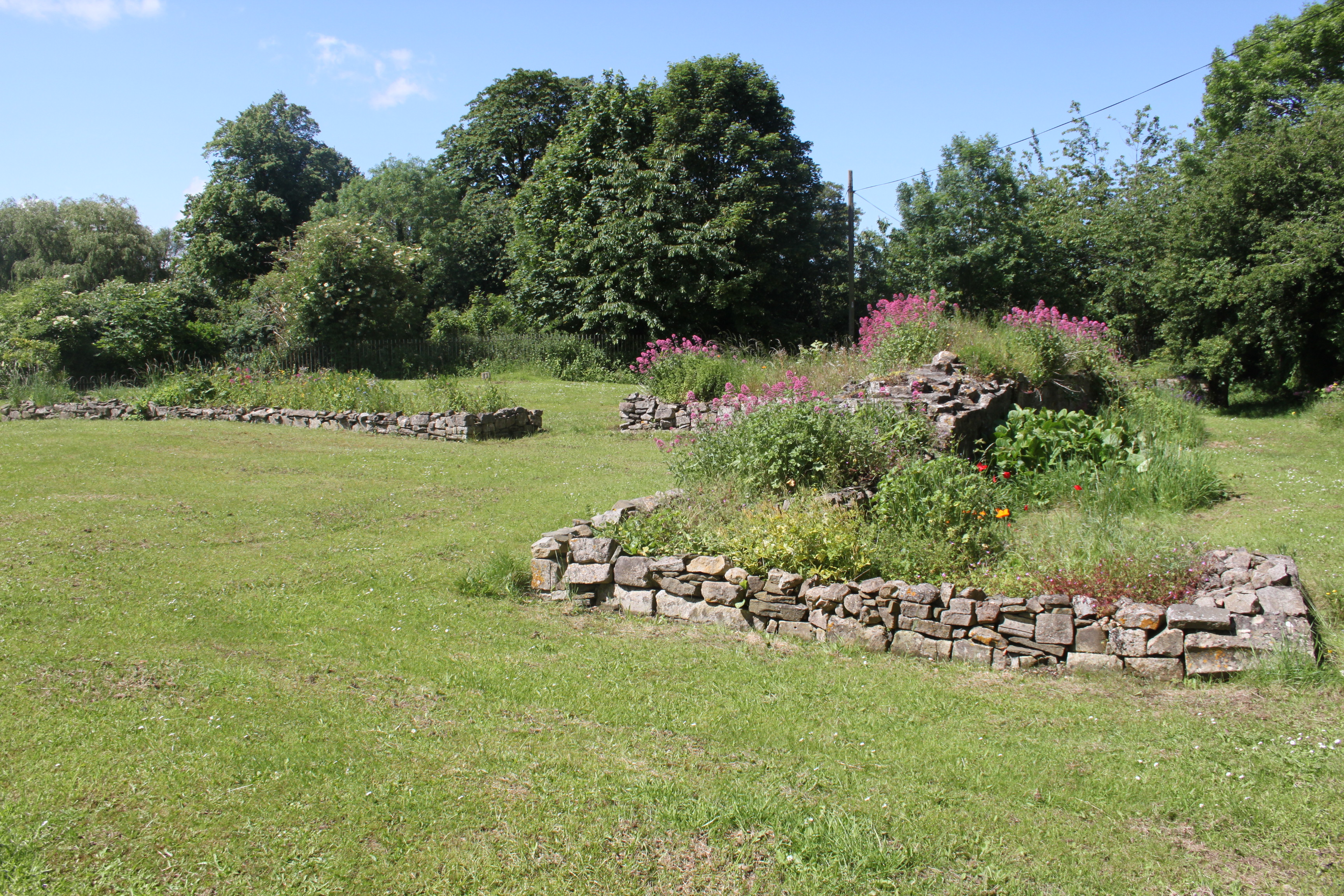
- Ruins of Keynsham Abbey
- Interactive map of Keynsham Abbey

Monastery information
- Full name: The house of the Canons of the Order of St. Austin and St. Victor
- Order: Augustinian
- Established: c. 1170
- Disestablished: 1539

People
- Founder: William, Earl of Gloucester

Site
- Location: Keynsham, Somerset, England
- Coordinates: 51.4172°N 2.4961°W

Keynsham Abbey in Keynsham, Somerset, England, was a monastic abbey founded c. 1166 by William, Earl of Gloucester. The abbey was established as a house of Augustinian canons regular, and operated until the dissolution of the monasteries in 1539.

== Location ==
Keynsham Abbey stood on the south side of the River Avon at its confluence with the River Chew, in what is now known as the Keynsham Hams, an alluvial flood plain consisting of open fields, pastures, and meadows, divided by hedgerows and ditches. The site has been inhabited since prehistoric times, and was also the site of a 4th-century Roman settlement, possibly called Trajectus, which was abandoned after the withdrawal of the Roman legions from Britain. The abbey was built near the old Roman Road, which became the Bath Road connecting London with Bath and Bristol. The ruins of the abbey can be seen in Keynsham's Memorial Park near the A4 and Keynsham railway station.

== History ==
=== Foundation ===
There had been a religious settlement in Keynsham during the 9th and 10th centuries, but the abbey was founded by William, Earl of Gloucester, the year of his son's Robert's death in 1166, and (according to tradition) at his son's dying request. It was founded as a house of Augustinian canons regular, or priests living in a monastic community and performing clerical duties. The canons at Keynsham adopted the then-popular monastic order of Saint Victor, so that the head of the religious house was always called an abbot, and the house was known as the House of the Canons of Saint Austin and Saint Victor.

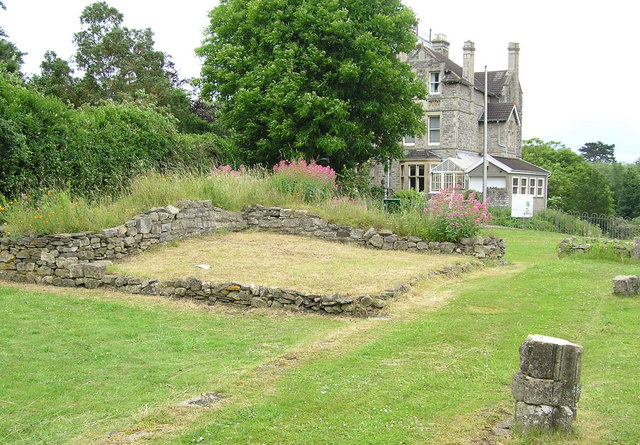
Ruins of Keynsham Abbey with the mansion house of Hanham Court in the background

At its foundation, the whole of the manor and the hundred of Keynsham, which covered an area of 24,520 acres (9,920 ha), was conferred upon the abbey. This included the parishes of Brislington, Burnett, Chelwood, Compton Dando, Farmborough, Keynsham, Marksbury, Nempnett Thrubwell, Pensford, Priston, Publow, Queen Charlton, Saltford, Stanton Drew, Stanton Prior, and Whitchurch. This also included numerous parish properties such as the church of St. Mary and St. Peter and St. Paul, and the chapels of Brislington, Charlton, Felton (or Whitchurch), Publow and Pensford.

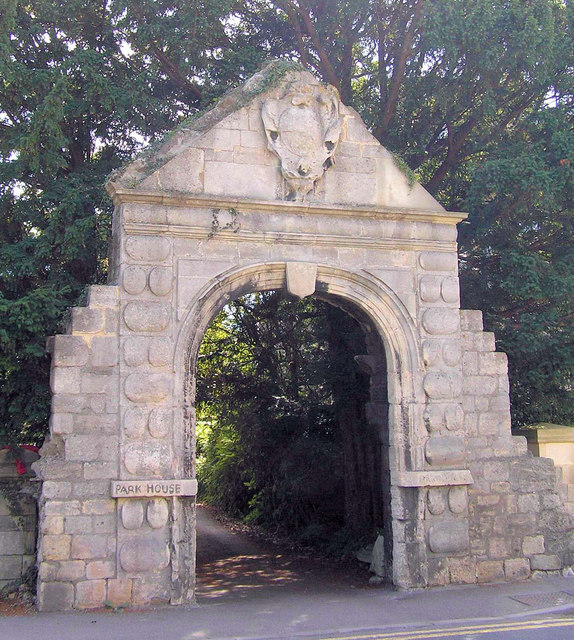
Many pieces of Keynsham Abbey were used in the construction of this archway, which used to stand at the entrance to the Tithe Barn or Estate Office of Keynsham, but was moved to Station Road in the 19th century

The arms of the abbey included six golden clarions or trumpets on a red ground, from the de Clares, Earls of Gloucester.

=== Growth and management ===
In 1276, King Edward I stayed at the abbey on his way from Bath to Bristol. A township eventually grew up around Keynsham Abbey, and in 1307, King Edward II granted the abbey a weekly market which was to be held on Tuesdays, as well as a yearly fair on the festival of the Assumption. These rights were confirmed by Edward IV in 1461. The abbey also acquired considerable property in Ireland.

As the centuries progressed, the abbey seems to have had occasional struggles with discipline issues. In 1350, the bishop drew attention to the fact that the canons were failing to properly guard and secure the outer gate of the abbey, and that the ornaments of the church and treasures of the house would be easily stolen as they were so poorly guarded. The canons were also admonished to keep better household accounts, attend prayers more regularly, and give up luxuries such as hunting dogs and dining outside the precinct. In 1353, the bishop visited again, and found great neglect throughout the abbey. The doors were again unguarded, household accounts were not properly kept, prayers were not attended to regularly, and up to two-thirds of the canons were regularly missing community meals and engaging in gaming. A similar issue arose again in 1450, and the bishop had many similar complaints and admonishments about the management and upkeep of the abbey.

=== Dissolution and deconstruction ===
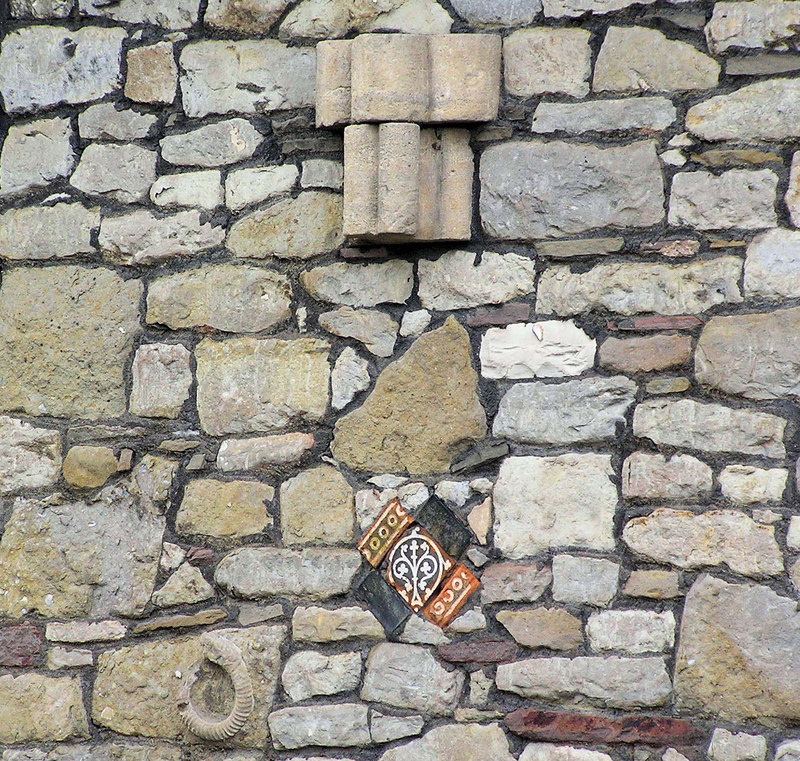
Abbey remains incorporated into a wall at Station Road

The Act of Supremacy was passed in 1534, making Henry VIII the supreme head of the English Church. The last abbot of Keynsham Abbey, John Staunton, along with the prior William Herne, the subprior John Arnold, and 12 other canons, subscribed to the Act of Supremacy, pledging fidelity to Henry VIII as the head of the church. The following year, in 1535, Henry VIII ordered a survey of the finances of the church, entitled the Valor Ecclesiasticus. He sent Richard Layton, one of his principal agents in church reform, on a tour of British monasteries and other institutions, with the aim of assessing their financial state and reviewing their documents and account books. Layton visited Keynsham Abbey in August 1535. Four years later, on 28 January 1539, John Tregonwell and William Petre, Henry VIII's privy councillor and Secretary of State, were sent to the abbey as "visitors". The abbot and ten canons surrendered the abbey, and the abbot and canons received pensions or annuities.

The surrender of the abbey began a 400-year period of disassembly and robbing the site for suitable building materials. The changes began almost immediately: within two years of the surrender of the abbey, the conventual church began to be dismantled and sold off. Records indicate that Richard Walker was paid £12 for melting the lead on the church, the cloister, and the steeple at Keynsham. Frances Edwards bought the seven bells of the church, and various unused buildings attached to it. The entire site was eventually sold to Thomas Bridges, who dismantled the existing structures and built his family house on the site. In 1559, Bridges bequeathed additional leftover stone from the Abbey Church for the repair of the bridge and causeway over the nearby River Avon.

The house built by the Bridges family was demolished in 1776. Victorian housebuilders and excavators began taking stone from the site in 1865, and continued until the turn of the century, until only isolated stretches of unsuitable stone or stone buried under discarded material were left. In some places, so much material was disturbed and excavated for reuse that quarrying penetrated down to bedrock.

== 20th century ==
In the 1960s, plans were made for the Keynsham bypass of the A4 to pass directly through the site of the abbey, which would necessarily destroy what was left of portions of the site. An archaeological excavation was made in advance of the construction. Amongst the finds was a fipple flute, a type of early recorder. The remains have been designated as a Grade I listed building and Scheduled Ancient Monument.

== Burials ==
- Jasper Tudor, Duke of Bedford died at Thornbury Castle on 21 December 1495, and was buried at Keynsham Abbey, which Lady Agnes Cheyne, the incumbent of Chenies Manor House, bequeathed to him in 1494.
- William Fitz Robert, 2nd Earl of Gloucester
- Robert Fitzwilliam, his son

== See also ==
- List of Grade I listed buildings in Bath and North East Somerset
- List of towers in Somerset
