= Church of St Lawrence, Stanton Prior =

Church in Somerset, England

Church of St Lawrence
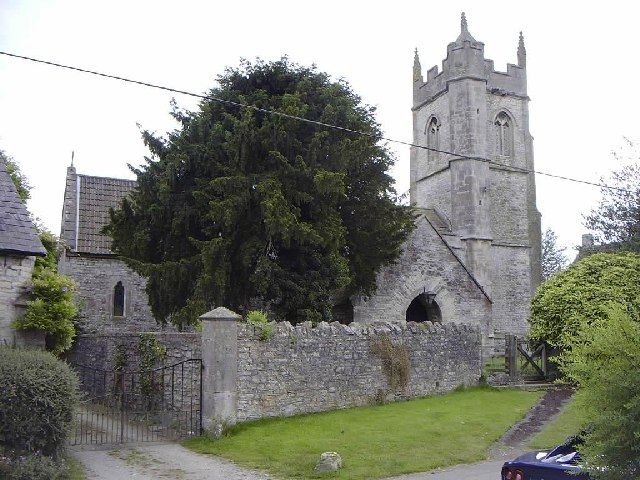

- Location within Somerset
- 51°21′46″N 2°27′50″W
- Location: Stanton Prior, Somerset, England

History
- Built: 12th century

Site notes
- Governing body: Church of St. Lawrence

Listed Building – Grade II*
- Designated: 1 February 1954
- Reference no.: 1129527

The Anglican Church of St Lawrence in Stanton Prior, Somerset, England, has its origins in the 12th century but is mainly 15th century. The church has been designated by English Heritage as a Grade II* listed building.

The church has a 3-stage tower, supported by diagonal buttresses with polygonal stair turret on the north east corner.

In 1860 a major restoration was undertaken and it was found that the nave and chancel were the same height, which had been obscured since the insertion of windows, raising of the walls and erection of the open timber roof during the Perpendicular Period.

The parish is part of the benefice of Farmborough with Marksbury and Stanton Prior, Clutton with Cameley, and within the archdeaconry of Bath.
