= Wilmington, Somerset =

Hamlet in Somerset, England

Coordinates: 51.3607°N 2.4394°W

Wilmington
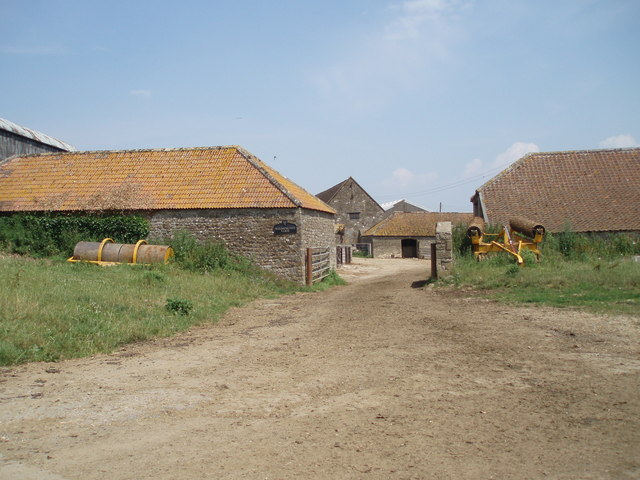
- Wilmington Farm

- Location within Somerset
- OS grid reference: ST6950362495
- Unitary authority: Bath and North East Somerset
- Ceremonial county: Somerset
- Region: South West
- Country: England
- Sovereign state: United Kingdom
- Post town: BATH
- Postcode district: BA2 9
- Police: Avon and Somerset
- Fire: Avon
- Ambulance: South Western
- UK Parliament: Frome and East Somerset

Wilmington is a hamlet in the civil parish of Priston within the unitary authority of Bath and North East Somerset, England. It is nestled in the hilly countryside between the villages of Marksbury, Newton St Loe, Stanton Prior and Priston, 5 miles (8 km) west of Bath.

It was previously in the hundred of Keynsham. The Domesday Book shows that in 1086 the settlement formed part of the estates of Bath Abbey under the lordship of a Walter Hussey, and consisted of nine households and a mill, with 10 acres of meadow and 10 of pasture.

Wilmington Farm, adjacent to the hamlet, is a cattle farm of 320 acres owned by the Duchy of Cornwall.
