= Church of St Peter, Marksbury =

Church in Somerset, England

Church of St Peter
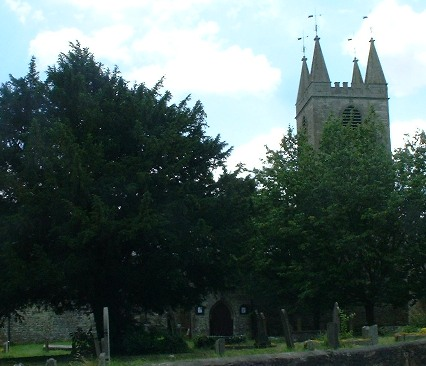

- Location within Somerset
- 51°21′33″N 2°28′49″W
- Location: Marksbury, Somerset, England

Listed Building – Grade II*
- Designated: 1 February 1954
- Reference no.: 1320777

The Church of St Peter in Marksbury, Somerset, England dates from the 12th century, although most of the current fabric is from the 15th century and is a Grade II* listed building.

The nave has two 2-light windows under hood moulds flanking a blocked, moulded round-headed door under a plaque dated 1627. The buttressed, off-centre chancel, which is out of line with the nave, has a three-light east window from 1875, which was also when the chancel arch and chancel roof were replaced. The organ chamber was built in 1893. The altar is a Jacobean oak table by Francis Leyborne Popham who died in 1880. A second altar table, which was previously in the church at Stanton Prior, was placed in the tower. The font is Norman.

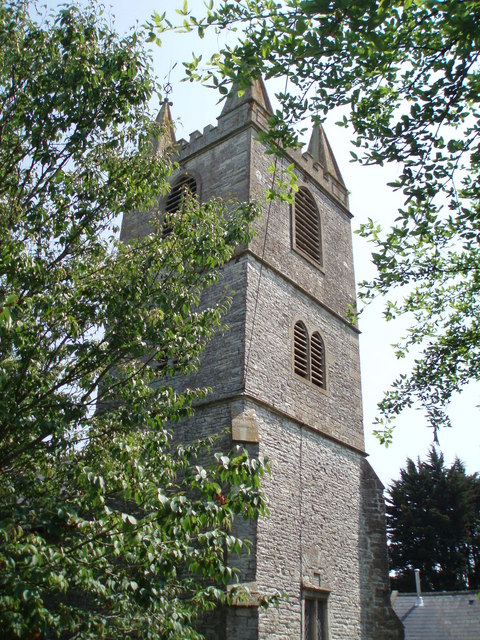
The tower

The three stage tower is supported by diagonal buttresses to the first stage, a canted stair turret in the return of tower and nave and a very small west door with a canted flat arch under a two-light, chamfered mullion window dating from 1634. The second stage has a cusped two-light window with heavy louvres to the north, a blocked single light to the east and two-light chamfered, vaguely pointed windows south and west. The third stage has one large, round headed window with raised architrave and louvres on each side, thin, embattled parapet dominated by four pyramidal pinnacles with vanes. The spikes above the tower angles were added in the 18th century. The four bells in the tower in 1782 were sent to the Bilbie family of Chew Stoke to be recast and additional metal added to make a set of six bells. The tenor bell was cracked in 1820 and recast in London. In the early 20th century a new roof was put on the tower and the bells rehung.

There are several monuments in the chancel including those to Counsell, 1671, and Wadden, 1682. In the nave is a monument to Boulter 1782, by Brewer of Box. Reverend William Counsell was the rector (1662–74). Francis Popham, of Littlecote House, died at Hunstrete House in 1779 and was buried in the chancel of the church. One of the stained glass windows is a memorial to a local resident who lost her life in Great Flood of 1968 when the River Chew flooded.

An unidentified monument in the churchyard is also listed by English Heritage. Joseph Harding who was responsible for the introduction of modern cheese making techniques and has been described as the "father of Cheddar cheese" is buried in the churchyard and there is a memorial plaque to his memory in the nave which was moved from the Methodist chapel.

== See also ==
- List of ecclesiastical parishes in the Diocese of Bath and Wells
