= Warrell =

Warrell is a surname. Notable people with the surname include:

- Charles Warrell (1889–1995), English schoolteacher
- Lincoln Warrell, founder of The Warrell Corporation

== See also ==
- Worrell
