= Dragon Boy =

Dragon Boy may refer to:

- Dragon Boy (manga), a 1983 manga by Akira Toriyama
- Dragon Boy (novel), a 1993 book by Dick King-Smith
