= Somerset Agriculture College =

Educational institution in Somerset, England

Somerset Agriculture College was a higher education institution based in Taunton, Somerset, England. Originally founded in the nineteenth century as a school for dairy production, it later generalised to other agricultural education. It has now been assimilated into Cannington College, a constituent of University Centre Somerset (UCS).

== Foundation ==
The college's origin was in the proposal of cheesemaker Joseph Harding, of Marksbury, who, having insisted on new standards of food hygiene in Cheddar cheese production, desired a place where dairy workers could be trained in advanced techniques for the safer production of his cheese. There was not enough demand at that time for such a college, so Somerset Agriculture College was founded as its realisation instead.

== Assimilation and continuation ==
In the twentieth century, Somerset Agriculture College became a constituent of UCS, which now offers Agricultural Management as a BSc honours degree.
