= Hundred of Keynsham =

Historical Hundred of Somerset, England

Keynsham Hundred
- Area
- 24,520 acres (9,920 ha)
- Status: Hundred
  - HQ: Keynsham
- Subdivisions
  - Type: Parishes
  - Units: Brislington, Burnett, Chelwood, Compton Dando, Farmborough, Keynsham, Marksbury, Nempnett Thrubwell, Pensford, Priston, Publow, Queen Charlton, Saltford, Stanton Drew, Stanton Prior, and Whitchurch

The Hundred of Keynsham is one of the 40 historical Hundreds in the ceremonial county of Somerset, England, dating from before the Norman conquest during the Anglo-Saxon era although exact dates are unknown. The structure, history, and development of the hundred and its putative Romano-British predecessor, from the mid-4th century to the mid-16th, have been studied in detail by Dr Lee Prosser. Each hundred had a 'fyrd', which acted as the local defence force and a court which was responsible for the maintenance of the frankpledge system. They also formed a unit for the collection of taxes. The role of the hundred court was described in the Dooms (laws) of King Edgar. The name of the hundred was normally that of its meeting-place.

The hundred of Keynsham consisted of the ancient parishes of: Brislington, Burnett, Chelwood, Compton Dando, Farmborough, Keynsham, Marksbury, Nempnett Thrubwell, Pensford, Priston, Publow, Queen Charlton, Saltford, Stanton Drew, Stanton Prior, and Whitchurch. It covered an area of 24,520 acres (9,920 ha).

The manor and Hundred was conferred on the Canons of Keynsham Abbey.

The importance of the hundred courts declined from the seventeenth century. By the 19th century several different single-purpose subdivisions of counties, such as poor law unions, sanitary districts, and highway districts sprang up, filling the administrative role previously played by parishes and hundreds. Although the Hundreds have never been formally abolished, their functions ended with the establishment of county courts in 1867 and the introduction of districts by the Local Government Act 1894.
