= Dick King-Smith =

English writer of children's books (1922–2011)

Dick King-Smith OBE Hon.MEd
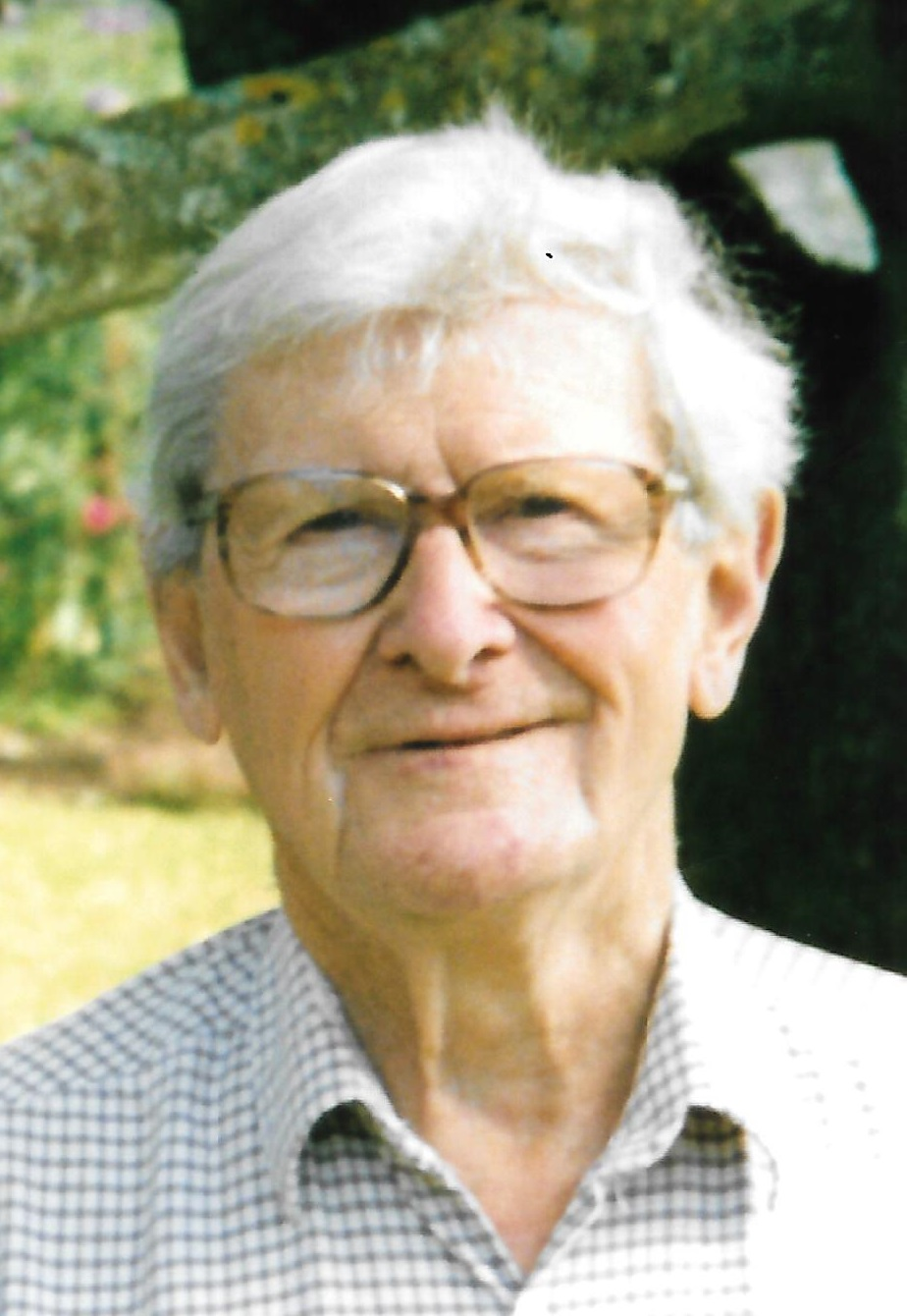
- King-Smith in 2002
- Born: Ronald Gordon King-Smith; 27 March 1922; Bitton, Gloucestershire, England
- Died: 4 January 2011 (aged 88); Bath, Somerset, England
- Resting place: Church of St Margaret, Queen Charlton
- Occupation: Writer
- Spouses: Myrle (m. 1943; died 2000) Zona Bedding (m. 2001)
- Children: 3
- Writing career
- Pen name: Dick King-Smith
- Period: 1978–2007
- Genres: Children's novels, picture books
- Notable work: The Sheep-Pig
- Notable awards: Guardian Prize; 1984
- Website: dickkingsmith.com

Ronald Gordon King-Smith OBE (27 March 1922 – 4 January 2011), known by his pen name Dick King-Smith, was an English writer of children's books. He is best known for The Sheep-Pig (1983), which was adapted as the movie Babe (1995) and translations have been published in fifteen languages. He was awarded an Honorary Master of Education degree by the University of the West of England in 1999 and appointed Officer of the Order of the British Empire (OBE) in the 2010 New Year Honours.

== Early life, military service ==
King-Smith was born on 27 March 1922 in Bitton, Gloucestershire and grew up in the West Country. His father was Captain Ronald King-Smith DSO MC, who ran several paper mills. King-Smith was educated at Beaudesert Park School and Marlborough College. He was a soldier in World War II, serving with the Grenadier Guards in Italy, and a farmer for 20 years before he became a teacher at Farmborough Primary School and author. King-Smith's first book was The Fox Busters, published in 1978 while he was living and teaching in Farmborough.

In 1941, at the age of 19, King-Smith enlisted as a recruit in the Grenadier Guards, and was subsequently commissioned into the Grandier Guards in December 1942. As a young platoon commander in September 1943, he took part in the Salerno Landings in Italy. On arrival in Salerno, his platoon fought their way up Italy, along with many others, which took months. On 12 July 1944, King-Smith was seriously injured by a British hand grenade thrown by a German soldier. He was only saved from certain death because he was sheltering behind a tree, which took the brunt of the explosion. He suffered extensive sharp wounds, and later, when he was back in England, a cerebral embolism, either of which could have killed him. He relinquished his commission in June 1946, "on account of disability", and returned to farming.

== Personal life ==
King-Smith met his wife, Myrle, on Christmas Day 1936. They were both 14. They were married at St. Mary's Church, Bitton, on 6 February 1943. They had three children: Juliet, Giles and Liz. Myrle died in 2000, and King-Smith subsequently married Zona Bedding, a family friend. He presented a feature on animals on TV-AM's children's programme Rub-a-Dub-Tub (1983).

== Death ==
King-Smith died on 4 January 2011 at his home near Bath, Somerset at the age of 88. He was survived by his 3 children, 14 grandchildren, 4 great-grandchildren, and 1 great-great-grandchild.

== Awards ==
King-Smith and The Sheep-Pig won the 1984 Guardian Children's Fiction Prize, a once-in-a-lifetime book award judged by a panel of British children writers.

== Works ==
- The Fox Busters (1978)
- Daggie Dogfoot; US title, Pigs Might Fly (1980)
- Magnus Powermouse (1982) (illustrated by Mary Rayner)
- The Mouse Butcher (1982)
- The Queen's Nose (1983) (illustrated by Jill Bennett)
- The Sheep-Pig (1983); US title, Babe: The Gallant Pig
- Harry's Mad (1984)
- Lightning Fred (1985) (illustrated by Michael Bragg)
- Saddlebottom (1985)
- Dumpling (1986)
- E.S.P. (1986)
- Noah's Brother (1986) (illustrated by Ian Newsham)
- The Hodgeheg (1987) (illustrated by Ann Kronheimer)
- Tumbleweed (1987)
- Country Watch (1987)
- Town Watch (1987)
- Farmer Bungle Forgets (1987) (illustrated by Martin Honeysett)
- Friends and Brothers (1987)
- Cuckoobush Farm (1987) (illustrated by Kazuko)
- George Speaks (1988)
- Emily's Legs (1988)
- Water Watch (1988)
- Dodo Comes to Tumbledown Farm (1988)
- Tumbledown Farm – The Greatest (1988)
- The Jenius (1988)
- Martin's Mice (1988) (illustrated by Jez Alborough)
- Sophie
  - Sophie's Snail (1988)
  - Sophie's Tom (1991)
  - Sophie Hits Six (1991)
  - Sophie in the Saddle (1993)
  - Sophie is Seven (1994)
  - Sophie's Lucky (1995)
- Ace (1990)
- Alice and Flower and Foxianna (1989)
- Beware of the Bull (1989)
- The Toby Man (1989)
- Dodos Are Forever (1989)
- The Trouble with Edward (1989) (illustrated by Jacqui Thomas)
- Jungle Jingles (1990)
- Blessu (1990)
- Paddy's Pot of Gold (1990) (illustrated by David Parkins)
- Alphabeasts (1990)
- The Water Horse (1990)
- The Whistling Piglet (1990)
- Mrs. Jolly (Series)
  - The Jolly Witch (1990)
  - Mrs. Jollipop (1996)
  - Mrs. Jolly's Brolly (1998)
  - The Jolly Witch Trilogy (2000)
- The Cuckoo Child (1991) (illustrated by Leslie W. Bowman)
- The Guard Dog (1991) (illustrated by Jocelyn Wild)
- Lightning Strikes Twice (1991)
- Caruso's Cool Cats (1991) (illustrated by Peter Clarke)
- Dick King-Smith's Triffic Pig Book (1991)
- Find the White Horse (1991)
- Horace and Maurice (1991) (illustrated by Sami Sweeten)
- Lady Daisy (1992)
- Pretty Polly (1992) (illustrated by David Parkins)
- Dick King-Smith's Water Watch (1992)
- The Finger Eater (1992)
- The Ghost at Codlin Castle and Other Stories (1992)
- Super Terrific Pigs (1992)
- The Invisible Dog (1993)
- All Pigs Are Beautiful (1993) (illustrated by Anita Jeram)
- The Merrythought (1993)
- The Swoose (1993)
- Uncle Bumpo (1993)
- Dragon Boy (1993)
- Horse Pie (1993)
- Connie and Rollo (1994)
- The School Mouse (1994)
- Triffic: A Rare Pig's Tale (1994)
- Mr. Potter's Pet (1994) (illustrated by Mark Teague)
- Harriet's Hare (1994) (illustrated by Roger Roth)
- The Excitement of Being Ernest (1994) (illustrated by Nigel McMullen)
- I Love Guinea Pigs (1994)
- Three Terrible Trins (1994)
- Happy Mouseday (1994)
- Bobby the Bad (1994)
- The Clockwork Mouse (1995)
- King Max the Last (1995)
- Omnibombulator (1995)
- The Terrible Trins (1995)
- Warlock Watson (1995)
- All Because of Jackson (1995)
- The Stray (1996)
- Clever Duck (1996) (illustrated by Nick Bruel)
- Dirty Gertie Macintosh (1996) (illustrated by Ros Asquith)
- Smasher (1996)
- Godhanger (1996)
- Hogsel and Gruntel (1996)
- Treasure Trove (1996)
- Mixed-Up Max (1997)
- What Sadie Saw (1997)
- The Spotty Pig (1997)
- A Mouse Called Wolf (1997) (illustrated by Jon Goodell)
- Robin Hood and His Miserable Men (1997) (illustrated by John Eastwood)
- Thinderella (1997)
- Puppy Love (1997) (illustrated by Anita Jeram)
- The Merman (1997)
- Round About 5 (1997)
- Mr. Ape (1998) (illustrated by Roger Roth)
- How Green Was My Mouse (1998)
- The Big Pig Book (1998)
- Creepy Creatures Bag (1998)
- The Robber Boy (1998)
- The Crowstarver (1998)
- Pig in the City (1999)
- Poppet (1999) (illustrated by Mike Terry)
- The Witch of Blackberry Bottom (1999) (illustrated by Ann Kronheimer)
- The Roundhill (2000)
- Spider Sparrow (2000)
- Just in Time (2000)
- The Magic Carpet Slippers (2000)
- Julius Caesar's Goat (2000) (illustrated by Harry Horse)
- Mysterious Miss Slade (2000)
- Lady Lollipop (2000)
- The Biography Center (2001)
- Back to Front Benjy (2001)
- The Great Sloth Race (2001) (illustrated by Tim Warnes)
- Fat Lawrence (2001) (illustrated by Mike Terry)
- Funny Frank (2001) (illustrated by John Eastwood)
- Chewing the Cud (2001) (autobiography)
- Titus Rules! / Titus Rules OK! (2002)
- Billy the Bird/All Because of Jackson (2002)
- Story Box (2002)
- The Golden Goose (2003)
- Traffic (2003)
- Clever Lollipop (2003)
- The Adventurous Snail (2003)
- The Nine Lives of Aristotle (2003)
- Aristotle (2003)
- Just Binnie (2004)
- The Catlady (2004)
- Under the Mishmash Trees (2005)
- Hairy Hezekiah (2005)
- Dinosaur Trouble (2005)
- Nosy (2005)
- The Mouse Family Robinson (2007)

== Adaptations ==
- Harry's Mad (1993–1996): TV series based on Harry's Mad
- The Queen's Nose (1995–2003): TV Series based on The Queen's Nose
- Babe (1995) and its sequel: film based on The Sheep-Pig
- Foxbusters (1999–2000): TV cartoon loosely based on The Fox Busters
- The Water Horse: Legend of the Deep (2007): film based on The Water Horse book
