= Sophie (book series) =

Series of children's books by Dick King-Smith

Sophie is a series of six children's books written by Dick King-Smith, and illustrated by David Parkins. The six books were written between 1988 and 1995.

== Plot ==
It is implied that the canon takes place from mid-1991 to December 1995 (see below for details), and follows the adventures of the titular character, Sophie, between the ages of four-and-a-bit, and roughly one week after her eighth birthday (Christmas Day, 1995). It is implied in 'Sophie Hits Six' that her family lives somewhere near Wessex, but at the end of the final book, the family relocate to the Scottish Highlands. The youngest of three children, she lives with her mother and father, and her identical twin brothers - Matthew and Mark - both two years older than her. She is a keen animal lover, and over the course of the six books she acquires various pets, including a cat (Tomboy), a rabbit (Beano), a dog (Puddle), and finally a pony (Lucky). During this time she starts school, goes on family holidays, and has riding lessons. She is constantly supported throughout the books in her ambition to become a 'Lady Farmer', and saves up 'farm money' (i.e. pocket money) so that one day she can purchase a farm. At the end of the final book, 'Sophie's Lucky', after her beloved Great-Great-Aunt Alice ('Aunt Al') peacefully dies of old age, she is left a Scottish farm as her eventual inheritance.

== Characters ==
Sophie – The titular character in the series. Her birthday falls on Christmas Day, and it is indirectly implied that she was born on 25 December 1986 (see below). In the first book she is four years old. She is often described as wearing a faded blue jumper with her name written on it, jeans and red wellies, and her hair is often quoted as looking like she's come through a hedge backwards. Her sole ambition in life - revealed in 'Sophie's Snail' - is to become a Lady Farmer. To this end she initially keeps 'flocks and herds' of various insects such as woodlice, earwigs and snails, down in the garden potting shed. However, as the series progresses, she accrues a collection of pets such as a cat named Tomboy (the focus of 'Sophie's Tom', a rabbit named Beano, a dog named Puddle ('Sophie Hits Six') and eventually a pony named Lucky ('Sophie's Lucky'). She is repeatedly described by several characters in the book, such as her family members and teachers, as 'small but very determined'. Despite often coming across as practical, stubborn and stern to other people, she is portrayed as loveable to her animals. She repeatedly employs certain phrases throughout the books, exclaiming 'yikes' when amazed or alarmed, and frequently describes people with whom she is displeased as 'mowldy [sic], stupid and assive'. The stories are told from Sophie's point of view, and there is the implication that she perceives certain animals she encounters as using the same phrases, or possessing the same traits, as she does. In 'Sophie's Snail' a snail Sophie finds is described as 'small but very determined'. Sophie has a continuous habit of refusing to accept when others try to correct her when she pronounces words wrong, she also disapproves of crying ('Sophie's Tom'), of telling lies ('Sophie's Snail') and of telling tales ('Sophie Hits Six'). However, her eyes fill with tears upon discovering that her parents have in fact bought Puddle the puppy at the end of 'Sophie Hits Six'(see below); and when Aunt Al dies, she is described as having gone down to the potting shed on her own, looked at Beano the rabbit (see below), remembered Aunt Al giving him to her, and broken into 'a really good howl' ('Sophie's Lucky').

Matthew and Mark – Sophie's identical twin brothers. Two years older than Sophie, they are practically indistinguishable in appearance to outsiders. They also speak and act very similarly, often saying the same things at the same time, though they don't always dress identically ('Sophie's Snail'). They love making visitors guess which twin is which, lying if the visitor correctly identifies them ('Sophie's Snail'). At times they can be quite disparaging of Sophie, running off and leaving her alone at times despite their parents' instructions to include her in their games, and initially telling her that she cannot be a farmer since 'farmers are men' ('Sophie's Snail'). Nevertheless, they are loyal and supportive of her in important or difficult situations. They give her a tractor and trailer for her birthday and Christmas combined in support of her aspirations, and call Dawn a 'beastly girl' for squashing one of Sophie's woodlice in 'Sophie's Snail'. They take time out from their football to watch and support her and Andrew practicing for the three-legged race in 'Sophie Hits Six', and describe her as having been 'brilliant' in her role as the Pied Piper in 'Sophie is Seven'. Their catchphrase involves Matthew saying "I know!" and Mark saying "I know what you're going to say!" in various situations, to which other family members sometimes interject with '...And so do I,' usually with disapproval or resignation. They are very sporty, are fast runners, and are often seen to be playing football.

Mother and Father – Sophie's mother and father are a traditional married couple of unspecified age. They initially humor her decision to become a lady farmer, but as they come to realize that she is serious in this ambition, they do whatever they can to help. Sophie's mother, being 'clever' at art ('Sophie's Tom'), is described as having drawn five different farm animal pictures - a pig, two hens, a cow, and a Shetland pony - all of which hang on Sophie's bedroom wall above her bed. She is gentle and patient with Sophie when Sophie uses malapropisms (a running gag throughout the series), or gets the wrong idea about certain things (such as her 'sponsored walk' in 'Sophie is Seven'). Sophie's father is said to like all animals except cats, but under Sophie's persistence, he soon allows Sophie to adopt a stray cat (Tomboy), and even takes a liking to her ('Sophie's Tom'). He is described as being fond of cricket ('Sophie is Seven', and is very into organizing sports at home, including the annual 'Olympic games' in late April for the twins' birthday ('Sophie's Tom'). He is occasionally seen to become somewhat impatient with Sophie's antics, such as when he has a bad back ('Sophie's Snail'); when Sophie pleads with him for a puppy ('Sophie Hits Six'); and when Sophie keeps interrupting the cricket ('Sophie is Seven'). The parents are never named in the series. We learn in 'Sophie Hits Six' that Sophie's father was never allowed to have a pet of his own growing up, but that Sophie's mother got her first dog - a terrier - when she was twelve.

Aunt Alice – 'Aunt Al' as the children call her, is the Scottish Great-Aunt of Sophie's father, and so is Great-Great-Aunt to the children themselves. In 'Sophie's Snail' she reveals to Sophie that she is eighty. In 'Sophie Hits Six', Aunt Al shares a childhood photo of herself aged nine, riding a pony. The photo is dated 1920, thus making Aunt Al's year of birth 1911, and placing the start of the canon (at which she is eighty, as she reveals to Sophie in 'Sophie's Snail') somewhere in 1991, during Sophie's fifth year of life. Sophie is especially fond of Aunt Al, since they both love animals, and share a no-nonsense approach to life. Nevertheless, Aunt Al is seen speaking sharply to Sophie for being disparaging of Dawn during her first riding lesson in 'Sophie Hits Six'. Aunt Al lives in a large house – complete with at least one employed domestic staff member – in the Scottish Highlands. She is described in the books as being quite 'bird-like', and, like the rest of Sophie's family, is very encouraging of Sophie's wish to become a Lady Farmer. She dies peacefully in the night at the end of 'Sophie's Lucky', shortly before her eighty-third birthday, and leaves her entire estate to Sophie's parents, and her farm to Sophie - on the condition that the family moves up to Scotland and inhabits the house. The book - and the canon - ends with the family fulfilling this condition.

Dawn – Described as a pretty little girl in the year above Sophie, of whom Sophie thoroughly disapproves. Dawn is portrayed as wearing immaculate frocks, as well as 'coral pink nail' varnish ('Sophie His Six'). She always has her golden hair tied in bunches that often colour-coordinate with her frocks, and is often seen carrying bright plastic toy ponies. Sophie and Dawn first meet in 'Sophie's Snail' when Sophie's mother invites Dawn and her mother round out of concern that Sophie is spending too much time alone, but Dawn calls Sophie 'Silly' for thinking that woodlice eat wood, and Sophie is scornful of Dawn's general presentation and manner. When Dawn stamps on one of Sophie's woodlice (insects she refers to as 'horrible, dirty creepy crawlies', thus offending Sophie further), Sophie retaliates by destroying her pink toy pony. Dawn is rarely portrayed as directly standing up to or deriding Sophie, but in revenge for Sophie squashing her toy pony, Dawn lures Sophie's future farm laborer, Duncan, away from her when Sophie is off school (see below). Thus they become longstanding enemies, although at Aunt Al's insistence, Sophie manages to speak some words of reassurance to her during their first riding lesson. Dawn is portrayed as being timid, rather spoiled, and scared of Sophie on multiple occasions, given Sophie's behavior towards her. Her parents are described as buying her many sweets, as well as a complete event outfit for her first riding lesson in 'Sophie Hits Six'.

Duncan – A short, tubby little boy with shaggy red hair, who is described as resembling a Shetland pony. He is a playmate of Sophie's from her class at school. He likes sweets, and is the smallest child in their class. She initially decides that he will work on her farm when they are older, and often instructs him to pretend to be a horse when they are playing, 'lungeing' him with a skipping rope. He is promised payment in kind upon his commencement as her future farm laborer, in the form of eggs, milk and cornflakes. However, when Sophie falls ill with chickenpox, Dawn bribes him with sweets and takes over the lungeing in Sophie's absence, thus transferring his allegiance from Sophie to herself in revenge for Sophie having destroyed her toy pony. Upon returning to school and discovering Duncan's defection to Dawn, Sophie 'sacks' Duncan as her farm laborer ('Sophie's Tom').

Andrew – A farmer's son who is the same age as Sophie. When Sophie discovers he is a farmer's son, she immediately sets out to make friends with him, in declaration that if she can't have a farm of her own, she will marry Andrew and inherit his father's farm when he retires or dies ('Sophie Hits Six'). However, when Sophie reveals her plan to marry Andrew, he is watching Television and inattentively replies "Oh, alright" to everything she says, thus is unaware of his fate ('Sophie Is Seven'). Just before Sophie moves away to Scotland, she reminds him of her fixed plan for their future together and to keep saving his pocket money. Andrew however remains glued to a sports channel on television, apparently uninterested anymore in farming talk or at all bothered that his 'fiancé's' is moving away. This is made evident when he's says "goodbye" to Sophie and is "Plainly anxious" to get back to his television program. Sophie then decided to call off her engagement to Andrew after inheriting a farm of her own in Aunt Al's will. ('Sophie's Lucky').

Tomboy – Sophie's first pet. She first appears in the book 'Sophie's Tom', on Sophie's fifth birthday (Christmas Day, 1991). She is mistakenly identified as a male by Sophie, on the basis that she is greedy like a boy. Tomboy is a coal black cat, and was originally named Tom by Sophie (who is unaware at this point that all male cats are called toms). However, when she gives birth to four kittens Aunt Al comes up with a new name - Tomboy - on the grounds that a Tomboy is a 'high-spirited girl who likes romping around' ('Sophie Hits Six'), as Sophie's cat does. Sophie initially decides the kittens are all queens, naming them 'Molly, Dolly, Holly and Polly'. However, it is later discovered that only one of them - Dolly - is a queen, identified as such by her tortoiseshell pattern, unique to queens. Two of Tomboy's kittens - both toms - are rehomed by strangers. One kitten - the only female, named 'Dolly' by Sophie - goes to Meg Morris, who pays five pounds for her at Sophie's specification. Dolly and Meg Morris reappear in 'Sophie Hits Six', when Sophie begins riding lessons at Meg's stables. The last of Tomboy's kittens is given to Aunt Al, with its name being changed from 'Polly' to 'Ollie' in keeping with its gender. Tomboy is subsequently spayed, much to Sophie's disappointment, as she had wanted to breed kittens to raise money for her farm ('Sophie Hits Six').

Beano – Sophie's second pet; a large albino rabbit who is a present from Aunt Al in return for Tomboy's kitten, Ollie. Sophie wonders what to call her new rabbit, and when she learns from Aunt Al that he has pink eyes because he is Albino, she settles for 'Beano' on the grounds that they already have an 'Al' in the family ('Sophie Hits Six').

Puddle – A white terrier puppy with a black patch over his eye, who appears in 'Sophie Hits Six'. He is bought as a pet for the whole family, but Sophie prefers to think of him as 'her' dog. In 'Sophie Hits Six', Sophie asks for a dog but is told by her parents she is too young. At Andrew's farm she discovers that his dog Lucy (a terrier) has given birth to a litter of puppies, one of which Sophie falls in love with. Both parents discuss how when they were younger they wanted a dog and had to wait until they were old enough, and laugh that they are definitely old enough now. On Christmas Day (1992) - Sophie's sixth birthday - they bring home puppy Sophie had fallen in love with at Andrew's father's farm. The family let Sophie choose a name for the puppy, suggesting things like Patch or Pirate in keeping with his appearance, but when the puppy urinates in a corner of the room, Sophie decides call him Puddle.

Lucky – A pony who appears in the final book 'Sophie's Lucky'. She first encounters Lucky when visiting Aunt Al up in the Scottish Highlands with her family. After Aunt Al's subsequent death, the house in Scotland and her large fortune is left to Sophie's family, along with money for Matthew and Mark and the farm for Sophie, to be inherited by her when she turns eighteen if she still wishes to be a lady farmer at that time. The week after that Christmas, when the family have moved into Aunt Al's property, the twins are given two brand new mountain bikes, and Sophie is given Lucky for her own. She says then that she is 'the happiest that I have ever been in my whole life'.

Dolly – Tomboy's only daughter; a tortoiseshell cat. When Tomboy has her four kittens Sophie hopes they are all girls and calls them Molly, Polly, Dolly and Holly in the hope that they themselves will grow up and have more kittens. However, when a 'large, tall lady' (later revealed to be Meg Morris - the owner of the local riding stables) visits with the intent of buying one of the kittens, she tells Sophie that all the kittens are boys except for Dolly, whom she buys. A couple of years later, when Sophie and her mother visit the stables to ask about riding lessons, Dolly is shown to remember Sophie; she runs straight up to her and rubs against her legs, which causes the stable owner to remember Sophie as well.

Ollie – Tomboy's son. Just like his mother, he is coal black. During the process of rehoming the kittens in 'Sophie Hits Six', Aunt Al rings up to ask if they have all gone, and Sophie explains that only one is left - the black one. Aunt Al asks if she may have him since her elderly cat has died, and changes his name from Holly to Ollie, short for Oliver.

== List of Books ==
- Sophie's Snail
- Sophie's Tom
- Sophie Hits Six
- Sophie in the Saddle
- Sophie is Seven
- Sophie's Lucky

In addition to appearing in print, all six books have been recorded undramatised and unabridged, read by Bernard Cribbins, and have been subsequently released both as Cassette tapes and CDs.
