= Queen Charlton =

Village in Somerset, England

Coordinates: 51.4018°N 2.5271°W

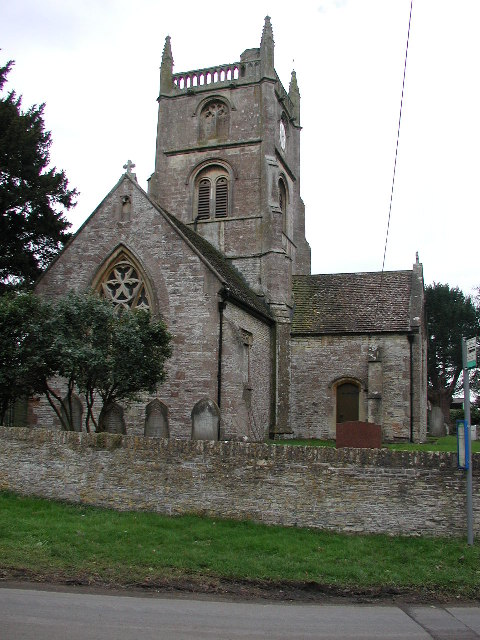
- Church of St Margaret

- Location within Somerset
- OS grid reference: ST634671
- Civil parish: Compton Dando
- Unitary authority: Bath and North East Somerset
- Ceremonial county: Somerset
- Region: South West
- Country: England
- Sovereign state: United Kingdom
- Post town: KEYNSHAM
- Postcode district: BS31 2
- Dialling code: 0117 986
- Police: Avon and Somerset
- Fire: Avon
- Ambulance: South Western
- UK Parliament: North East Somerset and Hanham

Queen Charlton is a small village within the civil parish of Compton Dando, within the unitary authority area of Bath and North East Somerset in Somerset, England. The nearest town is Keynsham, which lies approximately 2 miles (3.2 km) north east of the village.

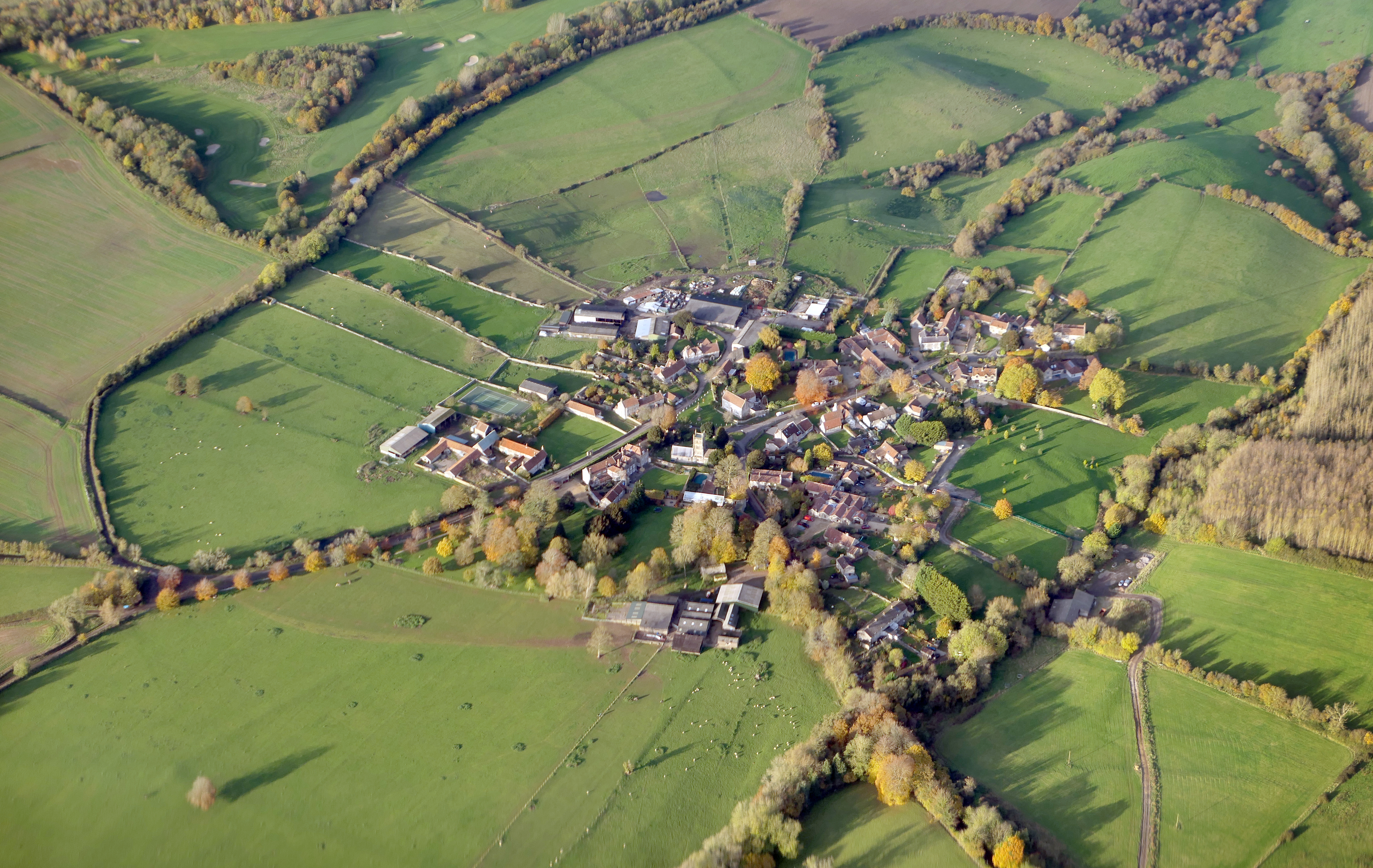
An aerial view of the village.

The village was originally simply Charlton, recorded in 1291 as Cherleton. It was an estate of Keynsham Abbey until the Dissolution, and the prefix was added when the estate was given by Henry VIII to Catherine Parr.

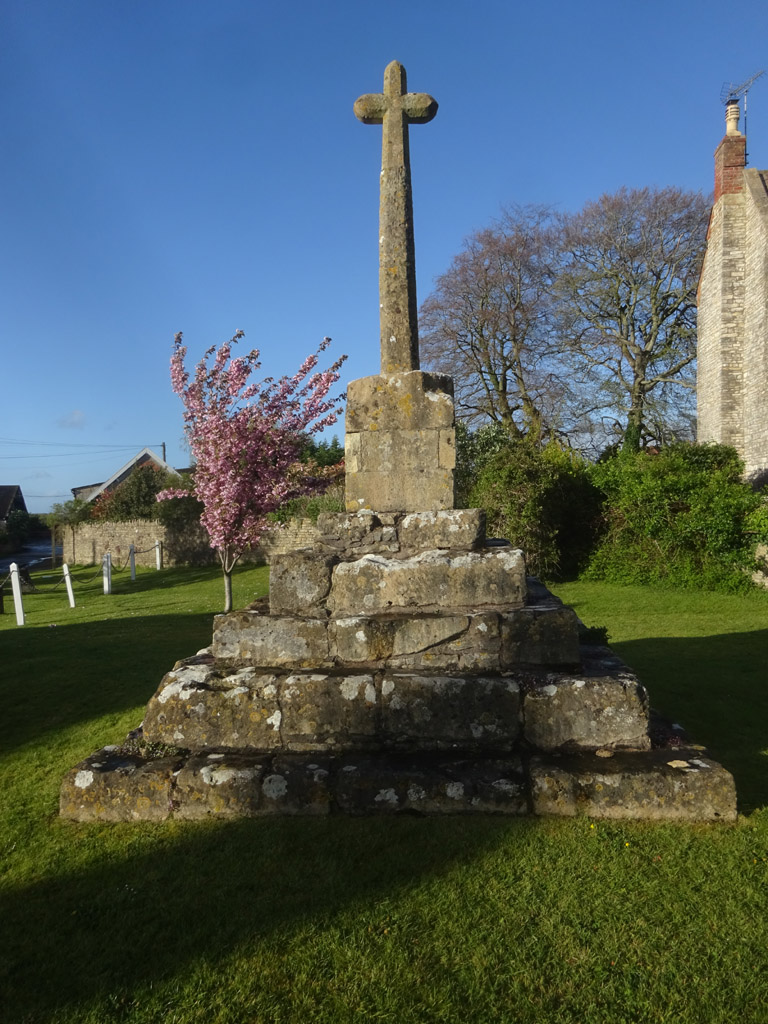
Village Cross, Queen Charlton, Compton Dando

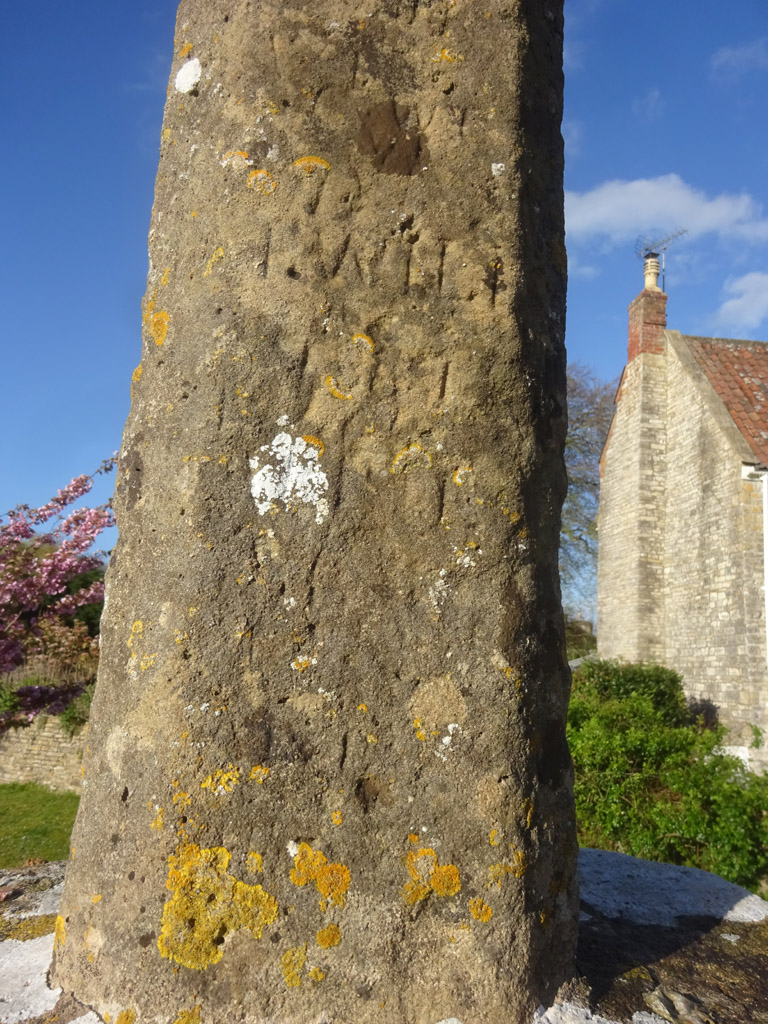
lower shaft of cross with traces of inscription

The Church of St Margaret dates from the 12th century. It has been designated by English Heritage as a Grade II* listed building. There is a late medieval cross on the village green. with decipherable inscription on the lower medieval section of the shaft.

In 1931 the civil parish had a population of 94. On 1 April 1933 the parish was abolished and merged with Compton Dando.

== Notable residents ==
The author Dick King-Smith lived in Queen Charlton until his death in 2011.
