= Joseph Harding =

English cheesemaker

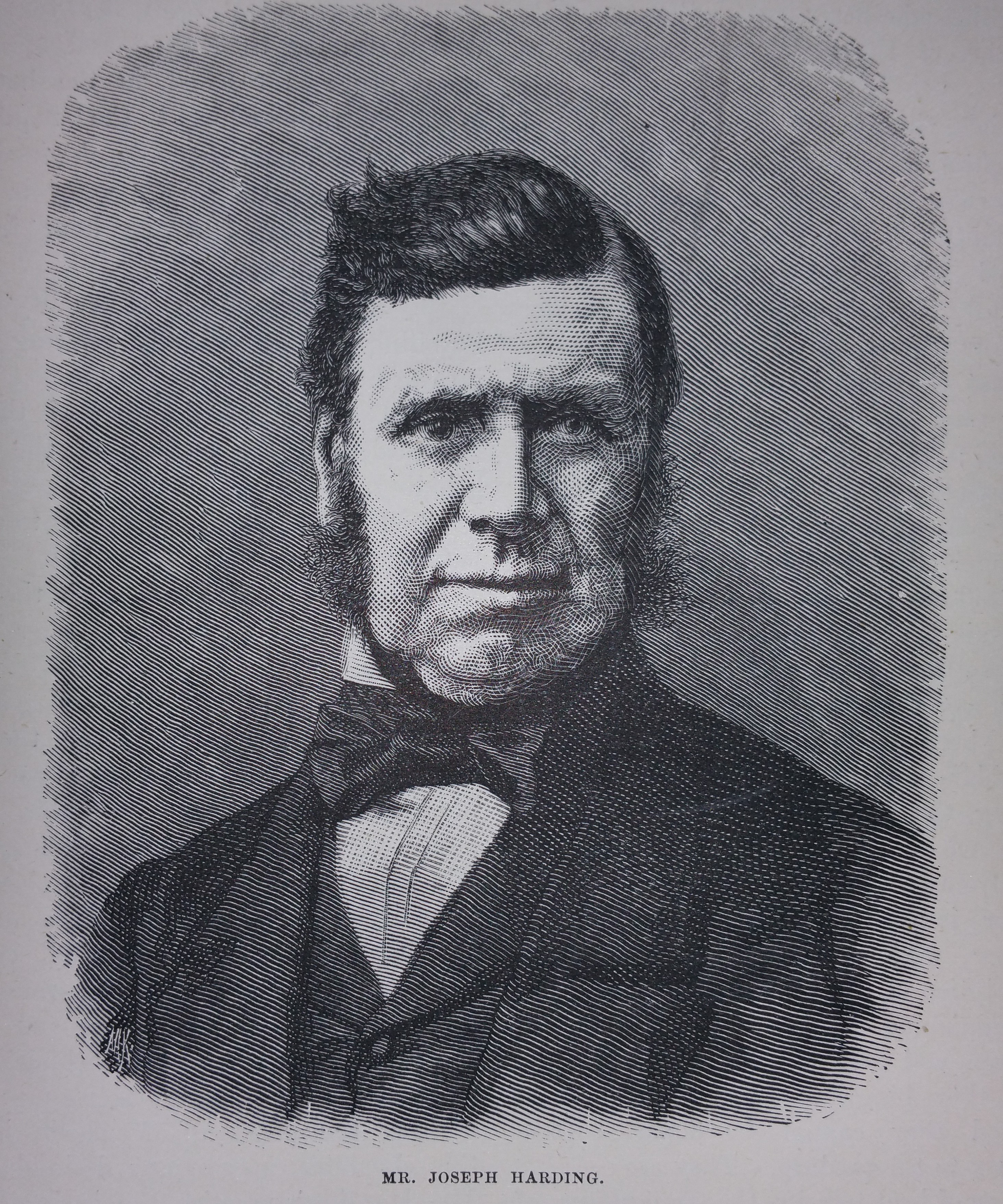
Etching of Cheese Maker Joseph Harding (1805–1876) of Wanstrow, Somerset, England

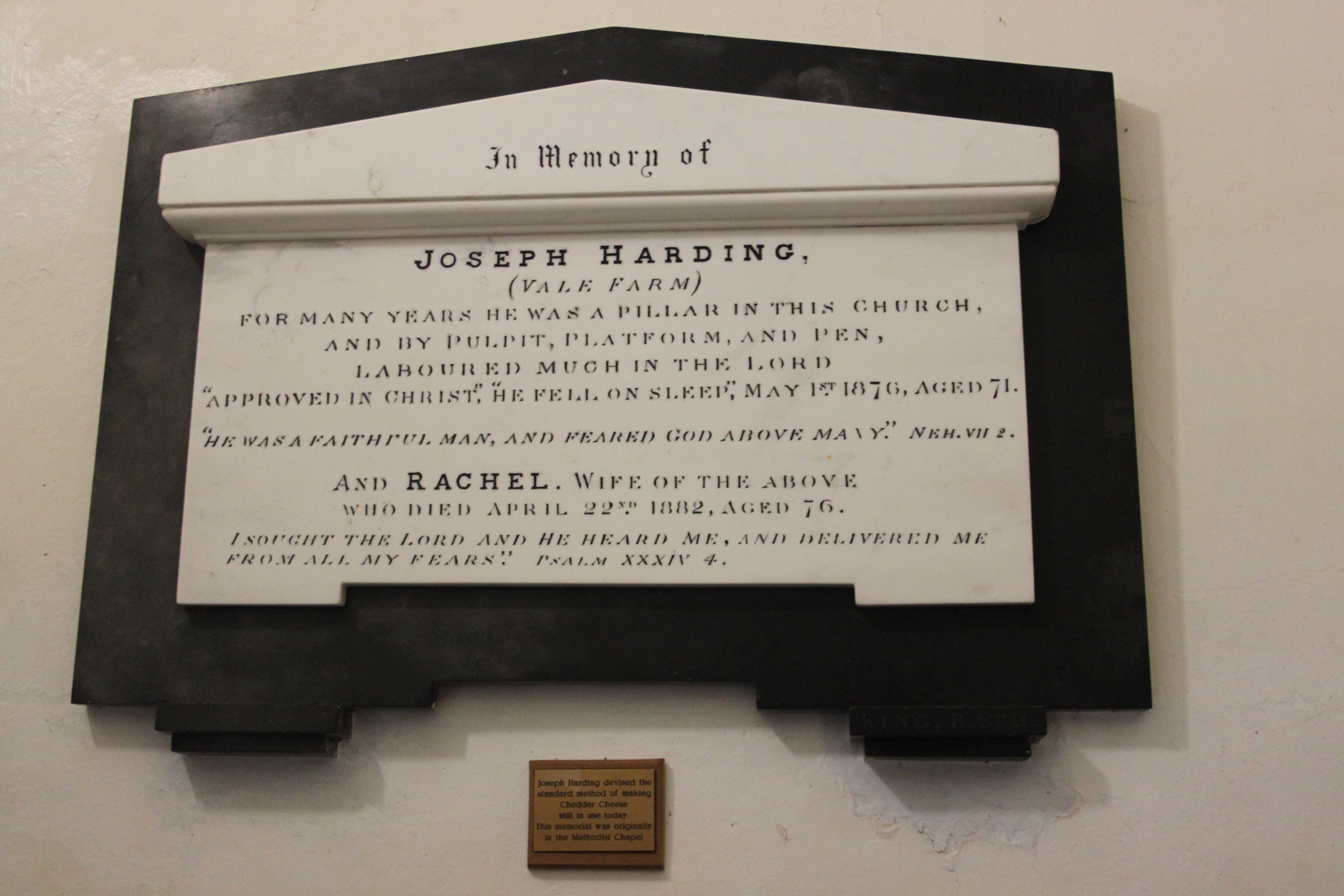
The memorial to Joseph Harding in the Church of St Peter, Marksbury

Joseph Harding (22 March 1805 in Sturton Farm, Wanstrow, Somerset, England – 1 May 1876 in Vale Court Farm, Marksbury, Somerset) was responsible for the introduction of modern cheese-making techniques and has been described as the "father of Cheddar cheese". He is credited with inventing the "definite formula" for the production of cheddar cheese.

A number of websites describe him as the inventor of the Cheese Mill. It is unclear if this assertion is true. The cheese mill is different from the cheese press, which has been used traditionally for centuries. Certainly, Harding introduced new equipment into the process of cheese making, including a "revolving breaker" for curd cutting, which saved much manual effort.

== Family background ==
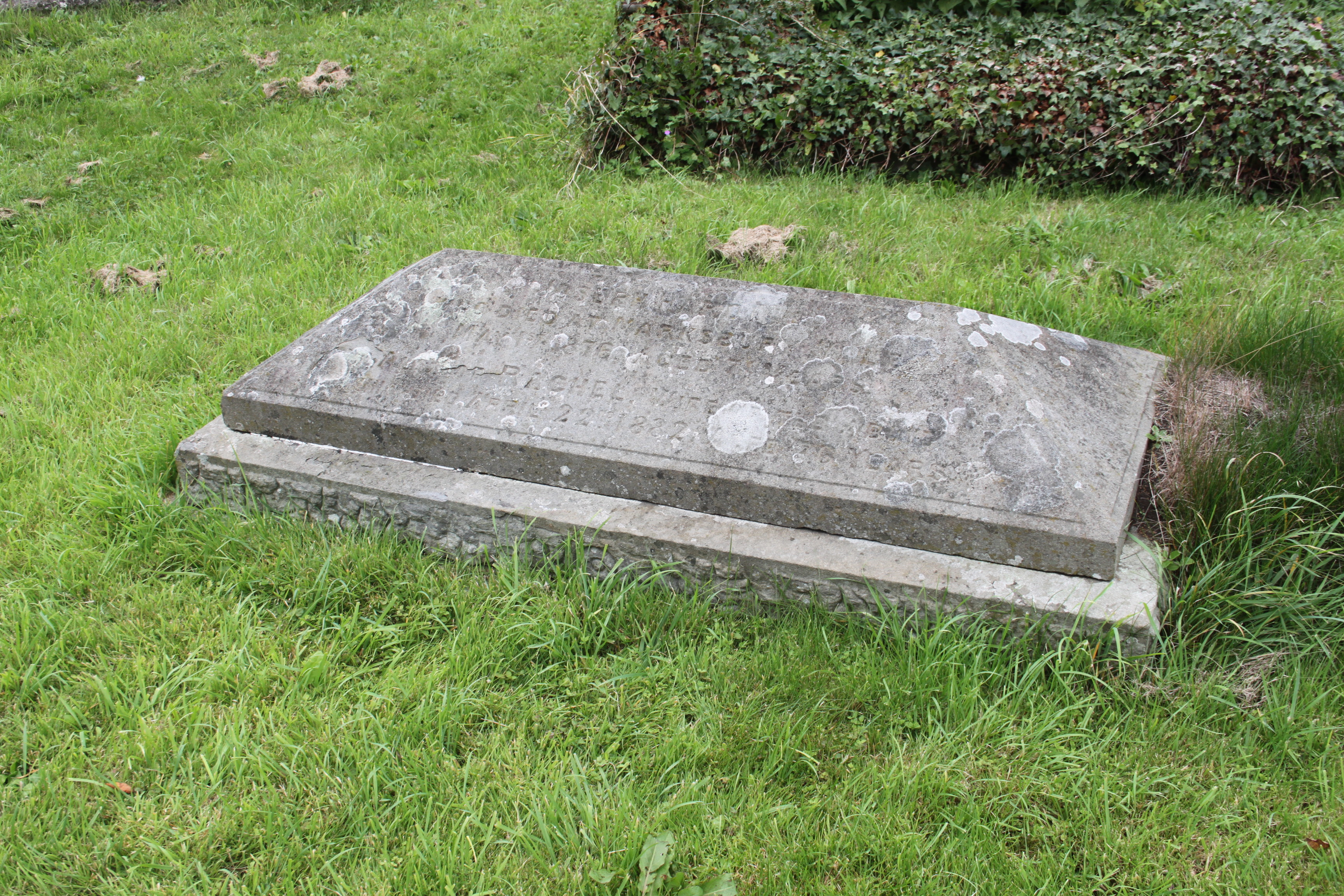
Joseph Harding's grave in the Church of St Peter, Marksbury

The Harding family had originally come from Pewsey, Wiltshire where they had farmed for five generations. Joseph Harding was the second son of Joseph Harding (born 24 June 1778, died Friday 23 September 1814) of Sturton Farm and Mary Yeoman of the Great House, Wanstrow. Mary was the daughter of John Yeoman who kept diaries of visits to London in 1774 and 1777. Joseph Harding's siblings were:

- Alonzo Harding, born on Friday 13 October 1802 (who died on Friday 7 February 1806)
- Joseph Harding born on Friday 22 March 1802 (of Cheddar Cheese fame, but clearly year of birth differs from that in introduction)
- John Harding, born on Saturday 18 March 1807
- Richard Harding, born on Sunday, 7 May 1809. Became a missionary to Jamaica.
- George Harding, born on Thursday 21 February 1811
- Mary Yeoman Harding, born on 18 December 1812 and mother of Rev. Henry Hayes Vowles. She had "a life of much sadness, but her sweet disposition, like her mother's, made her a favourite with everybody".
- Isaac Harding born on Monday 20 February 1815. Isaac became a missionary in Australia at the time of the great gold discoveries. There "he led a very active and adventurous life until he died in 1897. It is said that he was stoned from one town and stopped the cricketers' Sunday play in another by pocketing their ball". He also became a missionary in New Zealand and had many descendants there.

Gravestone of Joseph Harding's sister Mary Yeoman Harding (right) at Stalbridge, Dorset: "Mary Yeoman Harding wife of Henry Vowles died Jan 10th 1886 aged 74 years. Hab im 17–18". Left is the grave of her son "Sacred to the memory of John Alonzo Vowles (of Bruton) who was drowned whilst bathing in the river Stour july 19 1865 aged 20 years"

Joseph Harding married Rachel Wimboult in St. Mary's Redcliffe, Bristol in 1824. They lived in Compton Dando and Marksbury. She was active in his teaching of cheese making techniques.

Joseph Harding was related to the family of Richard Hardinge (c1593 – ), groom to the Bedchamber to Charles II and Member of Parliament in 1640 for Great Bedwyn.

The Victoria County History of Somerset says: "In 1856 the Joseph Harding system of cheese-making was made public as the result of a deputation of Scotchmen coming south to investigate the originators of the system. To Mrs Harding, Marksbury, and her nephew, Joseph Harding, of Compton Dando, is due the institution of a definite procedure in cheese-making for mere rule of thumb. For twenty years the Harding system was the model, though nearly every maker had his or her variations in detail. The main feature, as we view it now, was the insistence on absolute cleanliness. The milkers were not allowed to bring the milk in direct from the farmyard. They had to pour it into a receiver outside the dairy wall, whence by means of a pipe it was conveyed inside to the cheese tub... [Here follows details of the method – R.D.R]. this was founded the real Cheddar cheese of modern commerce. The name of Harding must go down with it for all time. It will be noticed that he did not use either the acidimeter or sour whey, but he lifted the make out of the old ruts of mere practical chance and introduced to it the more definite methods of science. Indeed, he must be rightly termed the first scientific instructor in Cheddar cheese-making".

== Technical innovations in the production of cheese ==
Joseph Harding is attributed with "an easy way of draining the curds of as much of their moisture as possible. This resulted in a semi-hard, close-textured, non-crumbly cheese, the style universally associated with Cheddar. Harding, born into a cheesemaking family in 1805, was more than any other individual responsible for the international spread of Cheddar as a popular cheese, helping to introduce Cheddar-making into Scotland, and also training American cheesemakers on their visits to Somerset." Another commentator has put his contribution thus: "his major contribution was to improve dairy hygiene and to standardise the methods used for making cheddar".

His dictum was "Cheese is not made in the field, nor in the byre, nor even in the cow, it is made in the dairy".

The English method of producing cheddar cheese was known in America as "the Joseph Harding Method".

Joseph Harding described good cheese as: "close and firm in texture, yet mellow in character or quality; it is rich with a tendency to melt in the mouth, the flavour full and fine, approaching to that of a hazlenut".

Harding believed that "a sharp cutting instrument in breaking the curd is injurious and that the curd should be allowed to split apart according to its natural grain".

Harding was insistent upon temperature control and strict hygiene in the production of cheese. He stated "the milkers may not enter the dairy, a tin receiver is placed outside the house, into which the milk is poured and conveyed to the cheese tub by a conduit, at each end of which is a strainer to prevent any filth from the yard from passing into the cheese-tub". This technique is notable as a development in food hygiene.

== Joseph Harding method ==
The Joseph Harding (or English) Cheddar system differed from later systems as follows:

- the manner in which the necessary acidity in the milk is produced. In the old method a certain quantity of sour whey was added to the milk each day before adding the rennet
- in the old method the curd was allowed to mature in the bottom of the tub

== Globalisation of a very English Cheese ==
Harding and his wife visited Ayrshire, Scotland and were responsible for the introduction there of modern cheese-making techniques. Similarly he received visits from Americans who took his ideas across the Atlantic. For these reasons cheddar cheese is produced not only in Somerset, but across the world. He did not charge for his educational efforts.

Not only did Harding himself teach his cheddaring methods in Scotland, but his wife was also invited to Ayrshire to teach.

The American dairyman Xerxes Willard visited Harding in England in 1866 and noted that in Harding's Cheddar system "He has simplified the process of manufacture and helped to reduce it more to a science". As a result of Willard's visit, cheddar cheese production and its popularity increased enormously in the United States.

Joseph Harding's son Henry Harding was responsible for introducing cheddar cheese production to Australia.

As a result of Harding's willingness to share his knowledge with foreign cheesemakers, later makers of cheddar from the West of England faced severe competition, in particular from intensive production in North America.

== Educational ideas ==
Harding was a strong believer in the promotion of education and proposed the establishment of a Dairy College in the West of England which was realised in the form of the Somerset Agriculture College.

== Literary capabilities and poetry ==
According to one early twentieth-century account: "although in the [account of the Victoria County History of Somerset (see earlier)] we do not see by any means the whole side of his character. His literary capabilities were of no mean order, and some of his poetry and prose shows great talent, while his work for his church was also noteworthy.

An example of Joseph Harding's poetry is cited below. This is a response to Rev. Samuel Wray, who had sent Harding a poem to thank him for sending a hare and Cheddar cheese for Christmas:

My dear Mr. Wary, I answer your lay
On behalf of myself and my wife
Your poetical lore has raked up my store
Long hid' neath the business of life
When you speak of our God in sending you here
And thank Him for blessings into the third year.
You should not have mentioned the cheese and the game
They do not deserve among presents a name
But I'm pleased that the hare, the "unparadised hare"
Stood so high in your own estimation,
For though it was sweet, and perhaps a treat,
I did not expect its translation.
His honours were great, as ordained by fate,
For just in the midst of its run
With Jerry on trail, just close to its tail
She died by a short from my gun. And this was not all, for after her fall 'Twas served on your table so good
Supplying two dinners for famishing sinners.
At last was angelical food.

== Publications ==
- "The Practical Aspects of Cheesemaking", The Ayrshire Advertiser (c.1859)
- "Recent Improvements in Dairy Practice", Royal Agricultural Society of England Journal (1860)
- "Cheese making in Small Dairies", Bath and West and Southern Counties Journal (1868)

== See also ==
- List of cheesemakers
- Somerset Rural Life Museum, Glastonbury, England
