= Martin's Mice =

1988 children's novel by Dick King-Smith

First edition

Martin's Mice is a children's book about a cat who befriends mice. It was written by Dick King-Smith. The first edition was published in 1988 by Gollancz Books.

== Plot ==
Martin is a farm kitten who likes to keep mice as pets, despite the mockery from his siblings, Robin and Lark, and the disapproval of his mother, Dulcie Maude. He keeps a pregnant pet mouse he met named Drusilla in a hidden tub before she gives birth to eight baby mice. Because of this, he learns how to take care of all nine mice while keeping them safe from being eaten by the other farm cats. He meets his dad for the first time, a smug tomcat named Pug, while simultaneously discovering the difficulties of caring for, finding love for Drusilla (a male mouse named Cuthbert), and protecting an entire family from the world. When Martin's baby mice eventually grow old enough, they complain to him and want to leave the tub, even though they recognize the dangers of the outside world. With an unfortunate encounter and a misunderstanding, Drusilla convinces herself that Martin killed Cuthbert, and runs away.

Martin later experiences existence as a pet for himself when he is 'bought' by a visitor to the farm, but eventually manages to escape. He returns to the farm after a meeting with a fox (although, unknown to Martin, the fox briefly tries to attack the farm before he is driven away by Pug and Dulcie Maude). Having learnt about freedom and responsibility, when he finds Drusilla's new home after returning to the farm, he leaves her and Cuthbert to make their own lives, treating her as a friend rather than a pet. Out of respect for his son, Pug notes that he has also given Drusilla's family a password- 'Martin's mice'- to use to prevent him accidentally eating any of them.
