= I-Spy (Michelin) =

Children's travel book series

The I-Spy books are spotters' guides written for British children. They were originally created by Charles Warrell in 1948 and have been published since then except for a gap in publication from 2002 to 2009.

== Concept ==
The I-Spy books are a series of small volumes that have sold hundreds of thousands of copies each, totalling sales of 25 million worldwide by 2010. Each book in the I-Spy series covers a different subject, such as I-Spy Birds, I-Spy Cars, I-Spy Horses & Ponies, I-Spy on a Train Journey, and so on. As children spot the objects listed, they record the event in the book and gain points, varying in amount according to how unusual the sight. In the early years of the series, completed books could be sent to Charles Warrell, (known as Big Chief I-Spy) for a feather and order of merit. The children participating in the game were known as The I-Spy Tribe, and by 1953 there were half-a-million members.

== History ==
The company was supposedly run by a Red Indian chief called Big Chief I-Spy. The original Big Chief I-Spy was Charles Warrell, a former headmaster who created I-Spy towards the end of his working life. He retired in 1956, but lived until 1995 when he died at the age of 106. After Warrell's retirement his assistant Arnold Cawthrow became the second Big Chief, and served in this role until 1978. For part of this time he also worked as an antiques dealer in Islington. He died in 1993, and is commemorated by a stone plaque placed on the outside of the Boatmen's Rooms, the house where he spent some of his last years in Deal, Kent.

The books were originally self-published in 1948 by Charles Warrell but, after a brief period when they were published by the Daily Mail, they were taken over by the News Chronicle newspaper and based in the paper's building in Bouverie Street. The regular I-Spy column, which appeared in the News Chronicle, reverted to the Daily Mail when the News Chronicle ceased publication in 1960, and continued to appear until the late 1980s. The books have had various publishers over the years including The Dickens Press, a company set up to continue the book publishing interests of the News Chronicle, and Polystyle Publications, a publisher of children's comics.

The books became very popular, with print runs well into six figures. Big Chief I-Spy had a succession of assistants, usually known as "Hawkeye". In the early 1970s, this position was held by Ralph Mills. Earlier assistants included Max Heinz and John Tagholm. In the 1980s, following a short-lived third Big Chief, Robin Tucek. David Bellamy replaced Big Chief I-Spy as the person to whom completed books were sent, and the earlier Red Indian connections were quietly dropped.

Michelin Travel Publications acquired and published the series from 1991 until 2002 when they effectively ceased publication. There were ad-hoc sales after that date to clear stocks.

The series was relaunched by Michelin in December 2009 with 12 new titles, followed by a further 12 in Spring 2010. The Bookseller announced the launch in October 2009 with an interview with Michelin Commercial Director Ian Murray. Murray confirmed that the initial 12 titles would include I Spy Birds, Cars, Trees, On a Car Journey and On a Train Journey. The new I-Spy titles are faithful to the original concept but are fully updated and include all new colour images.

The relaunch of the books and subsequent multiple expansions of the title list suggested that their popularity is being enjoyed by a new generation of children.

== Spotterbook Series ==
5 titles, self-published in 1948. Pricing was 1/-.

1. Spotting Famous Cars
2. Spotting Car Numbers
3. Spotting Football Stars
4. Spotting by the Sea
5. Spotting in the Country

== Daily Mail Series ==
8 titles, published in 1949 & 1950. Pricing was -/6.

1. At the Circus
2. Secret Codes
3. Dogs
4. In the Country
5. At the Zoo – Animals
6. At the Zoo – Birds and Reptiles
7. Horses
8. History

== Der Späher (The Scout) Series ==
German editions, published from 1956–57.

1. Aūto / Automobiles
2. Aūf der Strasse / On The Road
3. Kunst und Geschichte / Art and History
4. Eisenbahn / Railway
5. Auf dem Land / The Land
6. Sport
7. Strassen-fahrzeuge / Road Vehicles
8. Haustiere / Pets
9. Das Rad / The Wheel
10. Bäume und Sträucher / Trees and Shrubs
11. Vom Fahrrad zūm Kleinstaūto / From The Bicycle to The Microcar
12. Werkzeūge / Everyday Work Tools

== National I-Spy Ranger Association Series ==
American editions, published from 1957–59 by TAB Books Inc, pricing was 15c.

1. On The Highway
2. Animals
3. Uniforms
4. Dogs
5. Railroads
6. Sports
7. Airplanes
8. Buildings
9. Signs & Symbols
10. Automobiles & Trucks
11. My Home Town
12. Wheels
13. Trees
14. People at Work
15. The World of Music
16. Rivers & Streams

== News Chronicle Series ==
=== I-Spy 6d Series ===
Launched in 1952, these followed the same basic format as the earlier Spotterbooks, as well as keeping the concept of a Big Chief I-Spy, but were issued in a more standard portrait format 4" by 5" (13 by 10 cm). Pocket sized, with thinner covers, each I-Spy title had 48 pages of pen drawings and descriptive text. The series was in print until 1966, with older titles refreshed every so often and updated.

The News Chronicle was taken over by the Daily Mail in 1960 and closed, but the I-Spy books were by now so popular that the Mail decided to re-associate themselves with the publication once more. The covers were redesigned to remove the News Chronicle name, but the Daily Mail logo was inside the books. Around 1963 this was also removed and the titles were simply published by The Dickens Press (who printed the Mail). With all these changes, up to five different editions exist of some titles.

1. At the Seaside
2. On the Farm
3. History
4. On a Train Journey
5. Dogs
6. In the Country
7. At the Zoo – Animals
8. At the Zoo – Birds and Reptiles
9. In the Street
10. On the Road
11. The Sights of London
12. Horses and Ponies
13. Ships and Harbours
14. Boats and Waterways
15. Aircraft
16. Cars
17. The Army
18. The Wheel
19. Sport
20. People and Places
21. Musical Instruments
22. Men at Work – Building
23. Antique Furniture
24. The Unusual
25. Road Transport
26. Town Crafts
27. Country Crafts
28. The Sky
29. People In Uniform / People
30. Motorcycles and Cycles
31. Bridges
32. Sports Cars
33. Roadmaking
34. The Land
35. Everyday Machines
36. In Hospital
37. Pets
38. On the Pavement
39. Churches

=== I-Spy Colour Series ===
Launched in 1952 as a companion range to the 1/- books, the I-Spy Colour Series was the same size and had the same number of pages as their 6d cousins, but used better, thicker quality paper with some inside pages in full colour. All 12 titles covered natural history subjects and the aim seems to have been to emulate similar but more expensive offerings from publishers like Ladybird and Observer's. Eight titles were issued under the News Chronicle name and four by The Dickens Press (which were new editions of discontinued titles that had originally appeared in the 6d black and white series). The 12 books were never numbered. The listing below is in order of their release, with the last title published in 1963. The covers of some of the earlier titles were later updated, appearing without the News Chronicle logo.

- Birds
- Wild Flowers
- Butterflies and Moths
- Wild Fruits and Fungi
- Trees
- Insects
- In Pond and Stream
- In the Garden
- Horses and Ponies
- Zoo Animals
- Dogs
- Fish and Fishing

=== I-Spy Priory Tea Cards ===
13 series released between 1957 and 1964. Series 1–8 each had 24 cards, series 9–13 each had 50 cards. The albums to collect the cards in cost sixpence.

1. Out & About
2. Pets
3. People in Uniform
4. Dogs
5. Cars
6. Flowering Trees
7. Men at Work
8. Bridges
9. Cycles & Motorcycles
10. Wild Flowers
11. Aircraft
12. Birds
13. Cars

=== Other publications ===
- I-Spy Annual (1954)
- I-Spy Annual (1955)
- I-Spy Annual Number Three (1956)

== The Dickens Press ==
=== I-Spy Super Series ===
A larger format launched in 1964, initially costing 2'6. The last title was published in 1968 and cost 3'6.

- Abroad
- All the Year Round
- Animals in Danger
- Archaeology
- At the Zoo
- British Wild Animals
- Cars
- Garden Flowers
- On a Car Journey
- On a Train Journey
- On the Seashore
- Ships and Boats

=== I-Spy Series ===
44 titles published from 1966 to 1972. Pricing was 1'- in 1966–68, 1'6 in 1968–70, 1'6 or 7.5p in 1970–71, 9p in 1971–72, 10p in 1972.

- Aircraft
- Animals at the Zoo
- Archaeology
- At the Airport (Note: New title)
- At the Seaside
- Birds
- Birds and Reptiles at the Zoo
- British Coins
- Buses & Coaches
- Butterflies & Moths
- Car Numbers
- Cars
- Churches
- Civil Aircraft
- Cricket
- Dogs
- Farm Animals
- Fishing
- Football
- Foreign Coins
- History
- Horses & Ponies
- In the Country
- In the Hedgerow
- In the Street
- In the Wood
- London from Trafalgar Square
- Lorries & Vans
- Military Aircraft
- On a Car Journey
- On a Train Journey
- On the Farm
- On the Motorway
- On the Road
- People
- Pets
- Ships & Boats
- The Sights of London
- Signs & Symbols
- The Sky
- Stamps
- Starter Book
- Trees
- Wild Flowers

=== Other publications ===
- I-Spy Adventure Annual (1965)

== Polystyle Publications Limited ==
=== I-Spy Series ===
43 titles published from 1972 to 1981. Pricing was 10p in 1973, 12p in 1973–74, 15p in 1974–76, 20p in 1976–77, 25p in 1977–78, 30p in 1977–79, 35p in 1978–80. I-Spy Sets, costing £1 in 1977, included the Animals and Birds Set, Car Travel Set and Countryside Set.

- Animals at the Zoo
- Archaeology
- At the Airport
- At the Seaside
- Birds
- Birds and Reptiles at the Zoo
- British Coins
- British Wildlife
- Buses & Coaches
- Butterflies & Moths
- Car Numbers
- Cars
- Cats
- Churches
- Civil Aircraft
- Cricket
- Dogs
- Farm Animals
- Fishing
- Football
- Gold Top
- History
- Horses & Ponies
- In Spring & Summer
- In the Country
- In the Hedgerow
- In the Street
- In the Wood
- Industry
- London from Trafalgar Square
- Membership and Code Book
- Lorries & Vans
- On a Car Journey
- On a Train Journey
- On the Motorway
- On the Road
- Pets
- Ships & Boats
- The Sky
- Stamps
- Starter Book
- Trees
- Wild Flowers

=== Other publications ===
- I-Spy Holiday Special (1974)
- I-Spy Annual (1976)
- I-Spy Holiday Special (1977)
- I-Spy Annual (1979)
- I-Spy Annual (1980)

== Ravette Limited ==
=== I-Spy Series ===
16 titles published from 1981 to 1982, before rebranding to I-Spy with David Bellamy in 1983. Pricing was 40p in 1981–82, 45p in 1982.

- Animals at the Zoo
- At the Seaside
- Birds
- Butterflies & Moths
- Cars
- Cats
- Fish & Fishing
- Horses & Ponies
- In Spring & Summer
- In the Country
- Membership and Code Book
- On a Train Journey
- Starter Book
- The Sky
- Trees
- Wild Flowers

=== I-Spy with David Bellamy ===
26 titles published from 1983 to 1987. Pricing was 65p in 1983–84, 75p in 1985–87.

- Archaeology
- At the Airport
- At the Art Gallery
- Birds and Reptiles at the Zoo
- British Coins
- British Wildlife
- Car Numbers
- Cars
- Civil Aircraft
- Creepy Crawlies
- Dinosaurs
- Fish and Fishing
- Garden Birds
- Garden Flowers All the Year Round
- Mammals at the Zoo
- Membership and Code Book
- Night Sky
- On a Car Journey
- On a Day at the Seaside
- On a Train Journey
- On the Farm
- Pets
- Pond Life
- Supermarkets
- Trees
- Wild Flowers

=== Other publications ===
- David Bellamy's I-Spy Book of Nature 1985
- I-Spy with David Bellamy Book of Nature (1986)
- I-Spy Book of Facts (1986)
- I-Spy Book of Transport (1986)
- I-Spy Guide to London (1986)
- I-Spy Guide to Windsor (1986)
- The I-Spy Quiz Book (1986)
- David Bellamy's I-Spy Book of Nature 1988

== Michelin Series ==
=== I-Spy Series (Original Launch) ===
From February 1991 to May 2001 Michelin published seventy titles including four "Mini-Atlases" and a special colour edition for the opening of the Channel Tunnel. Price was 99p in 1991, £1.25 in 1991–94, £1.50 in 1995–98, £1.99 in 1999–2001. Hardcover editions were available for selected titles, priced £1.99 or £2.50.

- Above Your Head
- Aircraft (Note: Hardcover edition available.)
- At the Airport
- At the Seaside
- At the Zoo
- Below Your Feet
- Bicycles
- Big Diggers & Working Machines
- Birds
- Birds of Prey & Owls
- Buses & Taxis
- Butterflies & Moths
- Caravans & Motor Caravans
- Cars
- Cars II
- Castles
- Cathedrals, Abbeys & Churches
- The Channel Tunnel
- Classic Cars
- Computers
- Creepy Crawlies
- Dinosaurs & Prehistoric Animals
- Dogs
- Dover Castle & Historic Kent
- Fishing & How To Do It
- Flags
- Football
- Ghosts, Mysteries & Legends
- Green Britain
- Hadrian's Wall
- History
- Horses & Ponies
- In Scotland
- In the Country
- In the Lake District
- In the Night Sky
- In the Town
- Inn Signs
- London (96 pages)
- The London Borough of Barnet
- The London Borough of Sutton
- Michelin Mini-Atlas Britain
- Michelin Mini-Atlas Britain 1992
- Michelin Mini-Atlas France (96 pages)
- Michelin Mini-Atlas France 1992 (96 pages)
- Michelin Mini-Atlas Italy
- Michelin Mini-Atlas The World
- Minerals, Rocks & Fossils
- Motorcycles
- Motor Sport
- Music
- Nature
- On a Car Journey
- On a Car Journey II
- On a Car Journey in France
- On a Ferry
- On a Train Journey
- On the Motorway & Car Numbers
- On the Seashore
- Pets
- Rugby Union
- Ships & Boats
- Sports
- Steam Engines & Locomotives
- Stonehenge & Historic Wessex
- Surrey
- Trees
- Trucks & Trucking
- Trucks & Working Vehicles
- The Weather
- Wild Flowers
- Zoos & Wildlife

=== Other publications ===
- The Big I-Spy Book (1991)

==== The I Spy Guide To ====
The I Spy Guide To was a series of thicker, colour books published in 1995–6 for £4.99 each:

- I-Spy Guide To Aircraft
- I-Spy Guide To British Birds
- I-Spy Guide To Cars
- I-Spy Guide To Wild Flowers

Two more titles were launched in 1997 but these were rebranded as Michelin Field Guides:

- The Michelin Field Guide To Insects
- The Michelin Field Guide to Minerals, Rocks & Fossils

=== I-Spy Series (Relaunch) ===
From November 2009 to 2015 Michelin published 62 books plus three boxed sets (one of which is made up of 70 individual cards). Price was £2.50 except Notebook (£1.99), Paris (£2.99), Goodwood: Festival of Speed (£3.50), Explore London (£4.99), Car Collection, Nature Collection, Out & About Car Set (£8.99).

- Aircraft
- Ancient Britain
- Animals
- At the Airport
- At the Seaside
- Bath
- Birds
- Black Country Living Museum
- Book of Facts
- Brooklands Museum
- Cambridge
- Camping
- Car Badges
- Car Collection (4-book boxed set containing Cars, Car Badges, Classic Cars, Every Vehicle on the Road, Notebook)
- Cars
- Castles & Battles
- Classic Cars
- Cool Cars
- Cotswolds
- Creepy Crawlies
- Dinosaurs & Prehistoric Animals
- Dogs
- Edinburgh
- Every Vehicle on the Road
- Explore London (128 pages)
- Flags
- Football Grounds
- Goodwood Festival of Speed
- 'Great' Britain
- Green Britain
- High Weald: Things to spot in the countryside of Kent, Sussex & Surrey
- History
- In the Countryside
- In the Garden
- In the Street
- Isle of Wight
- Kings & Queens
- Lake District
- London
- London's Transport
- Minerals, Rocks & Fossils
- Mini World Atlas
- Modern Britain
- National Portrait Gallery
- Nature
- Nature Collection (4-book boxed set containing Nature, In the Garden, Trees, Wild Flowers, Notebook)
- The Night Sky
- Notebook
- On a Car Journey
- On a Car Journey in France
- On a Ferry
- On a Road Trip
- On a Train Journey
- On the Motorway
- On the Water
- Out & About Car Set (boxed set of 70 cards and Notebook)
- Oxford
- Paris
- People & Places
- RHS Garden Wisley
- Scottish Nature
- Sports & Games
- Trees
- Wild Flowers
- Working Vehicles

== Collins Michelin ==
=== What can you spot? (2016 to 2018) ===
Price was £2.99 or £3.99.

- At the Airport
- At the Gallery
- At the Museum
- At the Seaside
- At the Shops
- At the Zoo
- Birds
- Butterflies & Moths
- Camping
- Car Badges
- Cars
- Cool Cars
- Creepy Crawlies
- Dogs
- Every Vehicle on the Road
- Flags
- Football Grounds
- Garden Birds
- Holiday Sticker Book
- In the City
- In the Countryside
- In the Garden
- In the Night Sky
- In the Street
- London
- Nature
- On a Car Journey
- On a Car Journey in France
- On a Ferry
- On a Road Trip
- On a Train Journey
- On the Motorway
- Something Beginning With...
- Trees
- Wild Flowers

=== Spy It! Score It! (2020–23) ===
Price is £3.99.

- At the Airport
- At the Seaside
- Autumn
- Birds
- Butterflies & Moths
- Camping
- Car Badges
- Cars
- Castles
- Christmas
- Churches & Cathedrals
- Cool Cars
- Creepy Crawlies
- Dogs
- Every Vehicle on the Road
- Fossils & Rocks
- Garden Birds
- Horses & Ponies
- In the Countryside
- In the Garden
- In the Night Sky
- In the Park
- In the Woods
- Ireland
- London
- Nature
- On a Car Journey
- On a Car Journey in France
- On a Road Trip
- On a Train Journey
- On a Walk
- On the Farm
- On the Motorway
- Rivers & Canals
- Scotland
- Spring
- Summer
- Trees
- Wales
- Wild Flowers
- Winter

=== Spy It! Solve It! (2020) ===
Price is £6.99.

- At the Airport Activity Book
- At the Seaside Activity Book
- In the Countryside Activity Book
- On a Car Journey Activity Book
- On a Train Journey Activity Book

=== Do It! Score It! (2022–23) ===
Price is £7.99.

- Countryside Challenge
- Garden Challenge
- Nature Challenge
- Seaside Challenge

=== Spy It! Stick It! (2022–23) ===
Price is £4.99.

- My First Birds
- My First Farm
- My First Journey
- My First Minibeasts
- My First Park
- My First Seaside
- My First Things That Go
- My First Wildlife

== I-Spy for Grown Ups ==
I-Spy for Grown Ups was a spoof series released by HarperCollins in 2016.

- Signs and Instructions You Must Obey
- The UK While It Lasts
- At the School Gate
- Pets When Human Friendship Is Not Enough

== See also ==
- Collecting
- I spy, a children's game after which the I-Spy books were named
- I Spy With My Little Eye, a children's book based on the I spy game
