= Magnus Powermouse =

1982 novel by Dick King-Smith

- First edition
- Author: Dick King-Smith
- Illustrator: Mary Rayner
- Cover artist: Jon Miller
- Language: English
- Publisher: Victor Gollancz Ltd
- Publication date: 12 November 1982
- Publication place: United Kingdom
- Media type: Print (hardback and paperback)
- Pages: 118 pp (first edition)
- ISBN: 0140316027

Magnus Powermouse is a children's novel by Dick King-Smith, first published by Gollancz in 1982 with illustrations by Mary Rayner.

== Plot ==
Magnus Powermouse was a large mouse, who gains supermouse strength fattened on patent Porker Pills.

Magnus is not just big; he has a ravenous appetite. His parents struggle desperately to keep him fed. In a moment of sheer desperation, Madeleine remembers finding a box of pills—Pennyfeather's Patent Porker Pills—which are, in fact, used for fattening pigs.

Madeleine accidentally ate a small amount of the pills while pregnant, and now they decide to feed the rest of them to the hungry infant Magnus. The pills work too well. Magnus doesn't just grow larger; he grows and grows until he is an enormous, fearless, and incredibly strong mouse—a true Power Mouse.

While his parents and their kind-hearted rabbit friend, Roland, are initially thrilled by Magnus's might—especially when he defeats a "Nasty Cat" that threatens the farmyard—his size and ferocity start to cause problems.

He is difficult to hide; a mouse that big can't stay a secret for long. His strength attracts attention and he becomes the talk of the farmyard.

The biggest threat comes from a cunning, sinister rat named Jim, who hears the legends of the enormous mouse and decides he wants to capture and tame Magnus for his own purposes, like running a rodent circus.

== Reception ==
The book received a positive review from Kirkus Reviews.
