= Church of St Luke and St Andrew, Priston =

Church in Somerset, England

Church of St Luke and St Andrew
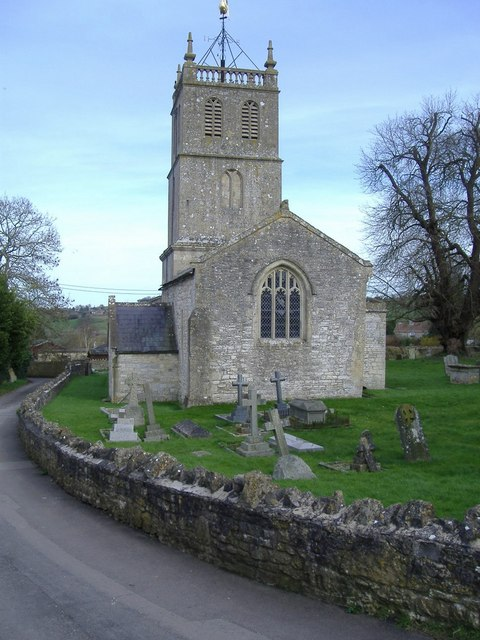

- Location within Somerset
- 51°20′31.2″N 2°26′32.2″W
- Location: Priston, Somerset, England

History
- Built: 12th century

Listed Building – Grade I
- Official name: Church of St Luke and St Andrew
- Designated: 1 February 1954
- Reference no.: 1312703

The Church of St Luke and St Andrew in Priston, Somerset, England has a nave dating from the 12th century, on the site of an earlier Norman church. It has been designated as a Grade I listed building.

The arches under the central tower include original stonework from the Norman era, but were rebuilt in 1859, with the chancel being restored 10 years later under Sir George Gilbert Scott.

The tower dates from the 15th century and is crowned with a disproportionately large weather vane given as a gift by the lord of the manor in 1813.

The interior includes a 14th-century octagonal font.

The parish is part of the benefice of Timsbury with Priston, Camerton and Dunkerton within the Diocese of Bath and Wells.

== See also ==
- List of Grade I listed buildings in Bath and North East Somerset
- List of towers in Somerset
- List of ecclesiastical parishes in the Diocese of Bath and Wells
