= I spy =

Children's guessing game

I spy is a guessing game where one player (the spy or it) chooses an object within sight and announces to the other players that "I spy with my little eye something beginning with...", naming the first letter of the object. Other players attempt to guess this object. It is often played as a car game.

== Rules ==
One player is chosen to be the Spy, and they silently select an object that is visible to all the players. They do not announce their choice, and instead say, "I spy with my little eye something beginning with ...", naming the letter the chosen object starts with (e.g. "I spy with my little eye something beginning with C" if the chosen object is a cow).

Other players then have to guess the chosen object. Traditionally players ask directly about particular possibilities ("Is it a cat?"). Once a guesser has correctly identified the object, they become the Spy for the next round and the game starts again. If younger children are playing who are not so good at guessing, the role of Spy can be passed around in a set order.

The Spy cannot change the object once it has been chosen. The game relies on trust as the Spy is the only person who knows whether the guessers are correct or not.

=== Variants ===
In situations where players are traveling from place to place through the course of the game, such as a car journey, players may agree that any chosen object should remain visible, rather than an item such as a particular street sign which will only be visible for a few moments when the game begins. Players may also agree to decide if the objects will be all outside or all inside the vehicle.

Some versions of the game allow players to narrow down the search with yes-or-no questions such as "Is it on your left?" or "Is it an animal?". The Spy can also offer clues if the guessers are stumped, such as saying ‘Hot’ when a guess is close or ‘Cold’ if it is not.

An alternative version is substituting the initial letter for an adjective such as the colour of the object (e.g. "I spy with my little eye something blue"), while another is to say "I Spy with my little eye something that sounds like". Some sites such as About Parenting describe the letter version as the variant to the colour-based game. This site has the form "I spy something, and it's blue" as the traditional version, deeming "I spy with my little eye..." as an alternative. Having clues based on an object's shape is another alternative, while quick thinkers can deliberately choose objects that can only be seen for a limited amount of time. Howcast notes that looking at an object when announcing its colour is a "dead giveaway" so this should be avoided.

Another variation that encourages language development involves the Spy giving various descriptive clues, such as describing a watch as "something made of metal and glass that makes a quiet noise".

== Purpose ==
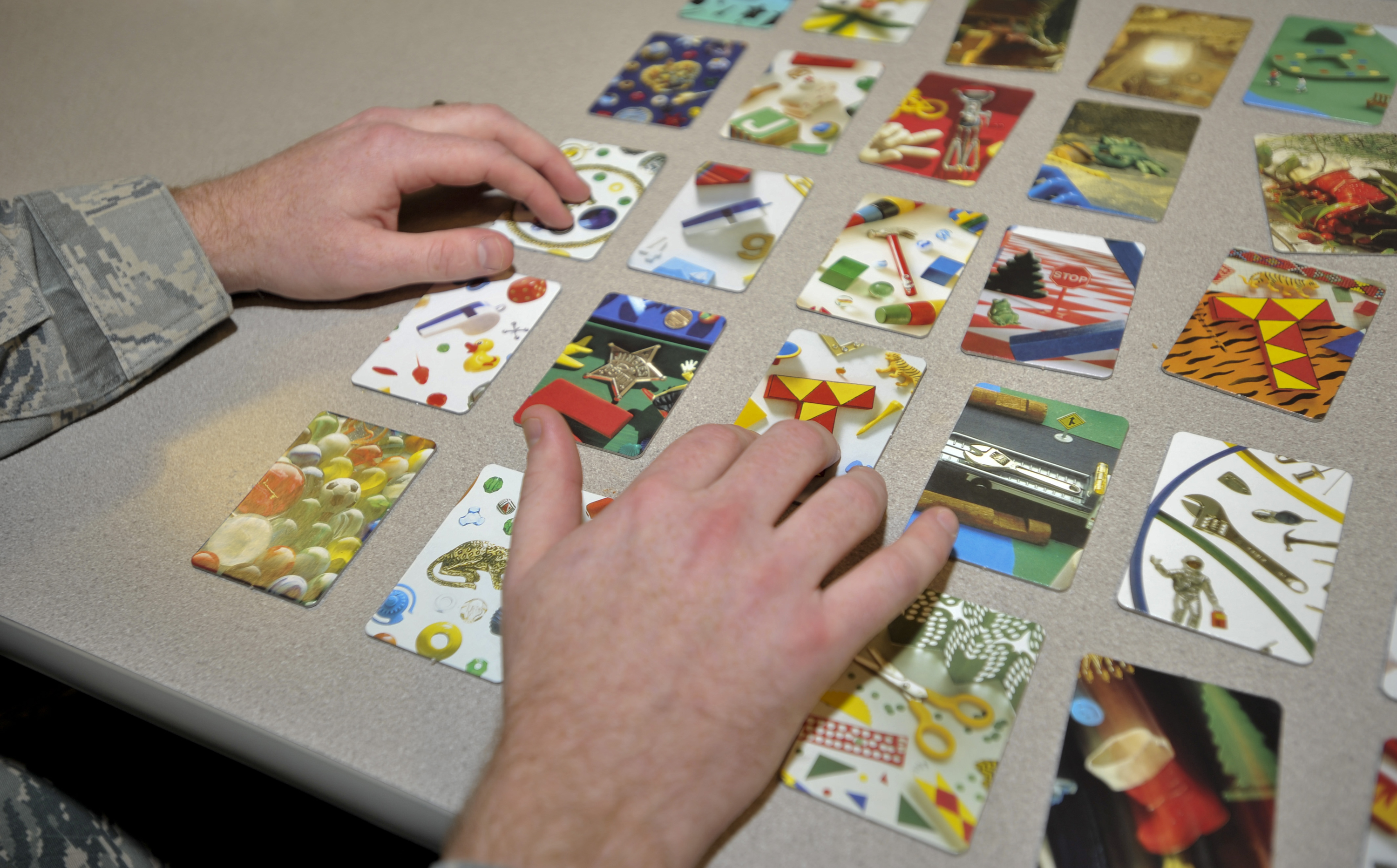
A patient in a traumatic brain injury clinic plays a game of "I Spy" with photographic cards, to help with cognitive functions that may have been lost

About Parenting notes, "I Spy is one of the first games that most children learn to play", and recommends the game for "doctor's offices, restaurants and other places where you sometimes have to wait with kids", but discourages its use in moving cars. The game "requires no equipment and can be played almost anywhere and with as many people as you want", both with adults and children, though a minimum of 2 players is required. I spy is often played with young children as a means to avert boredom in long journeys. A survey by British insurance company Direct Line found that 58% of families played I spy, and 65% of the parents consulted had played it on journeys as a child. Raising Children Network recommends a colour-based variation of the game for pre-schoolers, and a variation encouraging the learning of sounds for school age kids ("I spy with my little eye something beginning with f-f-f. What do you think I’m looking at that starts with that sound?") The fun comes with trying to discover the identity of a mysterious object. The game allows kids to practice their oral/aural skills.

Mary Tomczyk argues I Spy is a clever reasoning game that allows kids to solve puzzles, and gives them an opportunity to "'stump' Mom or Dad". She says children "learn to be more observant about the world around them, learn about colours, shapes, and textures, and use logic and reasoning to draw conclusions". She recommends it for preschool and kindergarten kids. Despite its simplicity and repetitiveness, the game grows a child's vocabulary and can also serve as a distraction for an impatient child. Howcast argues "It will keep their minds occupied just about anywhere." The game can be played in almost any environment, indoors or outdoors, including indoors on a rainy day.

== History ==
The game I Spy is first recorded in the early 20th century. The Oxford English Dictionary (OED) defines it, under Spy giving the earliest citation as a mention in Rosamond Lehmann's 1946 work The Gipsy's Baby. A Brief Manual of Games for Organized Play lists a game named "I See" which is similar to "I Spy". One etymological website though reports an earlier mention in a 1937 Canadian publication. The concept likely originated from the spy-mania that occurred during and after World War II. In a 1985 The Free Lance-Star article Games to play on the road, I Spy is described as a variant of The Detective Game, and has the player say "I spy something, the color _____. Can you guess what I spy?" Detective involves the player telling one of their children they are looking for a certain object and giving them clues until they get it right. After succeeding, the child becomes the clue giver. This version can only be played with two people.

The Oxford English Dictionary also records I Spy as a variant spelling for the different children's game of Hy Spy, with citations going back to 1777. Phrase Finder notes "The guessing game was preceded by another children's game called I Spy (or Hy Spy), a variant of what is now called Hide and Seek and was known in the UK from the 18th century." A 1931 edition of The Age describes I Spy (literally "Eye Spy") as a dynamic variant of Hide and Seek. Another variant was played at the Art Institute of Chicago in 1972 where children heard a tape and watched slides that gave them hints to certain art pieces. One 19th century children's book is titled "I Spy With My Little Eye".

== Popular culture ==
There are many games that are based on this concept, examples being the I-Spy series of gamebooks that ask players to find objects in a Where's Wally?-esque setting, and an I Spy computer game.

The game was the namesake for the 2017 song "iSpy", featuring American rappers Kyle and Lil Yachty, which features the wording in its chorus.

The game and its wording are well known in western popular culture, for example the title of the 2002 horror film My Little Eye uses part of the wording from the game.

An American short film directed by Alexander Nebel titled I Spy has the following synopsis: "Full of imagination, Mia convinces bored Ingo to play the game of ‘I Spy’. More and more the game dissolves the ordinary kitchen into a wildly animated sea-adventure dream reality."

In 2007, The Wiggles: a popular children's music brand included the song "I Spy" based on the game. The song is available on The Wiggles' Getting Strong (Wiggle and Learn) DVD and audio CD.

There's also a "John Cleese on How to Irritate People" sketch in which two bored airline pilots are playing I Spy as a pastime while on cruise flight.

The term 'I spy with my little eye' has been used by singer Robbie Williams in his song "Love Supreme", released in 2000.

The video game Minecraft has an in-game achievement that is named "Eye Spy". The horror video game Andy's Apple Farm also features a minigame where the player plays some rounds of "I spy".

Strawberry Shortcake attempts to play the game during one episode of Strawberry Shortcake: Berry in the Big City when she gets trapped in a traffic jam.

== See also ==
- "Cock Robin", a nursery rhyme that includes the phrase "my little eye"
- I Spy (book series), an American series of picture books published by Scholastic Press (1990s-)
- I-Spy (book series), a British book series published from the 1950s
- I Spy with My Little Eye, a book of the game
