= Church of St Margaret, Queen Charlton =

Church in Somerset, England

Church of St Margaret
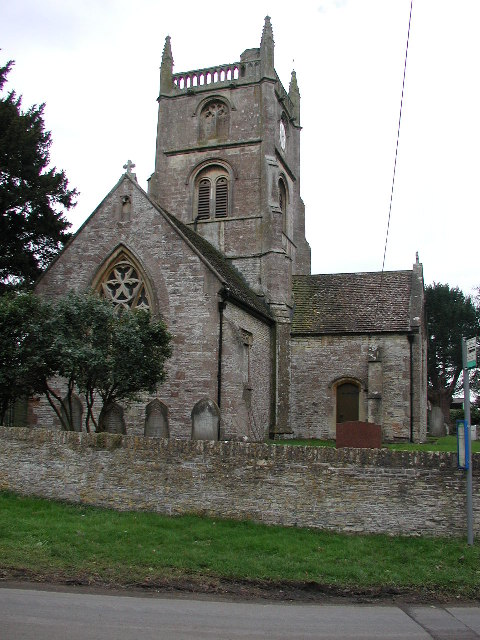

- Location within Somerset
- 51°24′03″N 2°31′38″W
- Location: Queen Charlton, Somerset, England

History
- Built: late 12th century

Listed Building – Grade II*
- Designated: 1 February 1956
- Reference no.: 1115380

The Anglican Church of St Margaret in Queen Charlton, Somerset, England, dates from the late 12th century. It has been designated by English Heritage as a Grade II* listed building. It is within the civil parish of Compton Dando, but the ecclesiastical parish of Keynsham and the Diocese of Bath & Wells.

The church was attached to Keynsham Abbey but also had its own collection of ecclesiastical buildings around 1200.

The building was altered in the 13th century and restored in the 15th. It was originally cruciform, but only the north transept remains.

The central two-stage tower is supported by diagonal buttresses, and is topped with a parapet with pierced arcading surrounded by pinnacles and gargoyles. It has a polygonal stair tower on the northeast corner. Beneath the tower at the crossing are four arches with attached Norman pillars.

In front of the church is a late medieval cross on the village green. It was previously sited further east of its current location, but was moved as part of the celebrations for the Jubilee of Queen Victoria.
