= Dragon Boy (novel) =

1993 children's novel by Dick King-Smith

- First edition
- Author: Dick King-Smith
- Cover artist: Jocelyn Wild
- Language: English
- Publisher: Viking Press
- Publication date: 1993

Dragon Boy is a children's novel by British author Dick King-Smith, first published in 1993. The novel is about John, a young orphan in the Middle Ages who is adopted by dragons.

Dragon Boy appears on numerous school reading lists and is taught in schools. It has been used as one of the practice texts for the English Common Entrance Examination for year 6 students to move to senior school.

== Plot summary ==
Montague Bunsen-Burner is a dragon who is put on a 'no-humans' diet by his wife Albertina. Out on a flight later that day, Montague discovers an orphan boy, John, and takes the boy home with him. John proves his worth as a member of the family when he teaches the dragon couple how to properly season their food to improve the flavour.

John takes in an orphaned wolf cub, naming him 'Bart' and training him as a pet. When Albertina lays her latest clutch of eggs, John, who has previously learnt that the dragons don't know that eggs must be incubated, discreetly takes one to try and heat it in a nest of weeds. A couple of months later, the stolen egg hatches, revealing a young female dragon who names herself 'Lucky.' From this point onwards, John is regularly described as the Bunsen-Burner's adopted son and Lucky's 'little brother.'

While the dragons take a holiday at a beach where Montague and Albertina went on their honeymoon, John and Bart are confronted by wolves. Lucky senses that her brother is in danger and returns to save him. During their time away, the Bunsen-Burners are attacked by a group of ambitious knights, but the dragons easily drive them away without any casualties. Albertina affirms that they must never eat humans again after everything John has come to mean to them.

As Lucky grows older, Montague and Albertina search for a potential husband for her in an arranged marriage, but their search fails; Montague discovers a pleasant family who only have seven daughters, and Albertina is rudely rejected by the head of a family of Welsh dragons. Fortunately, Lucky discovers a boy dragon called Gerald Fire-Drake during a return trip to the beach, and the two form a deep attachment that blossoms into romance. During this time, John has a brief encounter with an outlaw who threatens to kill him, but Bart senses his master's peril and hurries to save him, followed by Albertina, affirming John's growing mythical status as the "Dragon Boy".

After an engagement of a couple of years due to Gerald and Lucky's youth, their wedding takes place near the lake where Lucky hatched. John gives a speech in his role as best man. Gerald and Lucky fly off for their honeymoon, leaving John to reflect on the joys of his life as a dragon boy.

== Reception ==
Critical reception for the book was positive. An unknown reviewer from Quill & Quire stated the author "fills the book with adventure and humour, keeps his touch light and his nonsense uncomplicated, and creates a world of human-dragon relationships that will resemble some young readers' own favourite fantasies: easy to accept and thoroughly entertaining." Shirley Lewis, writing for Emergency Librarian, felt the book was "[f]ull of excitement and danger." Moira Robinson, in Magpies, compared King-Smith's writing to Quentin Blake's illustrations. She stated the adventures in the story were "all good rollicking fun with terrible jokes about knights in armour" or "appalling parodies." The Junior Bookshelf's D. A. Young stated: "Dick King-Smith makes the most of the satirical possibilities offered by attributing the foibles of the class system to the world of dragons." A. Fisher from Books for Your Children likened Dragon Boy to other stories by the author, adding that it is well-written.
