= I Spy with My Little Eye =

2011 children's picture book by Edward Gibbs

I Spy With My Little Eye
- First edition
- Author: Edward Gibbs
- Illustrator: Edward Gibbs
- Language: English
- Genre: Children's picture book
- Published: 2011 (Brubaker, Ford & Friends (Templar UK))
- Publication place: United Kingdom
- Media type: Print (hardback)
- Pages: 32 (unpaginated)
- ISBN: 9781848771970
- OCLC: 1008185858

I Spy With My Little Eye... is a 2011 children's picture book by Edward Gibbs. It is based on the I spy game with the reader being given written and visual clues about an animal on the initial double page and the answer with a picture of the animal on the following double page.

== Reception ==
A review by Booktrust wrote "The guessing game itself is great fun, but it's the bold, elegant illustrations and ingenious design which set this book apart, making it a more complex experience for young readers."

I Spy With My Little Eye has also been reviewed by Kirkus Reviews (star review), Publishers Weekly (star review), The Horn Book Magazine, School Library Journal, and ForeWard Reviews,

It was a 2012 Missouri Building Block Picture Book Award nominee.
