= Priston =

Civil parish in Somerset, England

Coordinates: 51.3432°N 2.4399°W

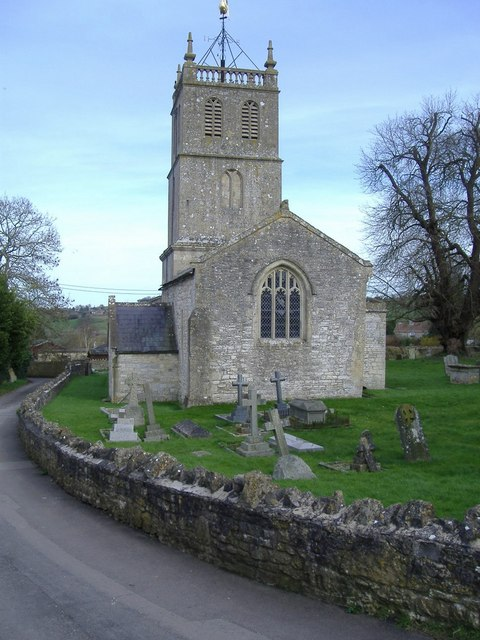
- Church of St Luke and St Andrew, Priston

- Location within Somerset
- Population: 232
- OS grid reference: ST694605
- Unitary authority: Bath and North East Somerset
- Ceremonial county: Somerset
- Region: South West
- Country: England
- Sovereign state: United Kingdom
- Post town: BATH
- Postcode district: BA2
- Police: Avon and Somerset
- Fire: Avon
- Ambulance: South Western
- UK Parliament: Frome and East Somerset

Priston is a civil parish and village 4 miles (6 km) south west of Bath in Bath and North East Somerset, which is within the English ceremonial county of Somerset. The parish includes the hamlet of Wilmington.

== History ==
A walled field boundary, which marks the boundary between the manor of Priston village and the former manor of Wilmington hamlet contains megaliths, indicating it may have been a boundary in pre-historic times.

Priston is the site of a Roman villa dating from about 100 AD. A coffin from this site was discovered in 1917.

Around 925 the manor of Priston was given by king Æthelstan to Bath Abbey.

The parish of Priston was part of the Keynsham Hundred,

The village is recorded in the Domesday Book as including the presence of a church, possibly wooden; however the nave of the Church of St Luke and St Andrew was added in the 12th century, and the church has a tower dating from the 15th century. It has been designated by English Heritage as a Grade I listed building. It is crowned with a disproportionately large weather vane given as a gift by the lord of the manor in 1813.

The manor was held by the Prior of Bath Abbey until the dissolution of the monasteries, passing into the hands of the laity. From the 18th century to 20th centuries it was held by the Jenkins family.

Priston Mill was given by the monks of Bath Abbey in 931. It is powered by a 25 feet (8 m) overshot water wheel. The present building dates from the late 18th or early 19th century and is maintained in working condition. The associated tithe barn was built around 1700 and is currently used as a wedding and conference venue.

Priston was in Keynsham Poor Law Union, with records showing it had a population of 292 in 1861, including the hamlet of Wilmington.

Priston was the site of a mine on the Somerset coalfield. The mine closed in 1930.

== Governance ==
The parish falls within the unitary authority of Bath and North East Somerset which was created in 1996, as established by the Local Government Act 1992. Before 1974 the parish was part of the Bathavon Rural District.

The parish is represented in the House of Commons of the Parliament of the United Kingdom as part of Frome and East Somerset.
