= Farmborough =

Village in Somerset, England

Coordinates: 51.3430°N 2.4844°W

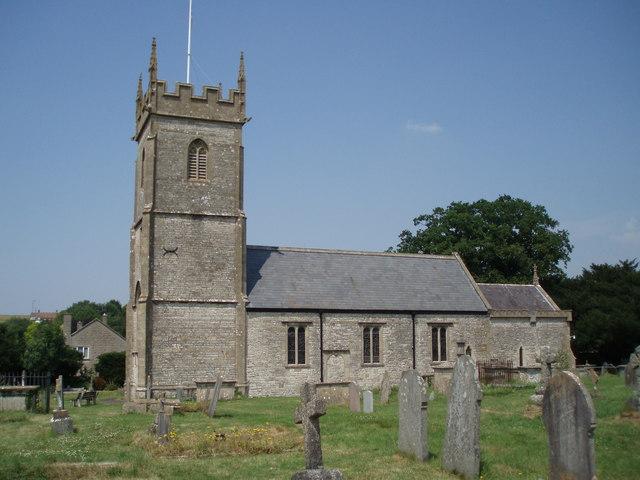
- All Saints Church

- Location within Somerset
- Interactive map showing parish boundary
- Population: 1,312 (2021 census)
- OS grid reference: ST663605
- Unitary authority: Bath and North East Somerset
- Ceremonial county: Somerset
- Region: South West
- Country: England
- Sovereign state: United Kingdom
- Post town: Bath
- Postcode district: BA2
- Police: Avon and Somerset
- Fire: Avon
- Ambulance: South Western
- UK Parliament: North East Somerset and Hanham

Farmborough is a village and civil parish, 6 miles (9.7 km) south west of Bath in Somerset, England. It straddles both the A39 and A368 roads. The parish has a population of 1,312.

== History ==
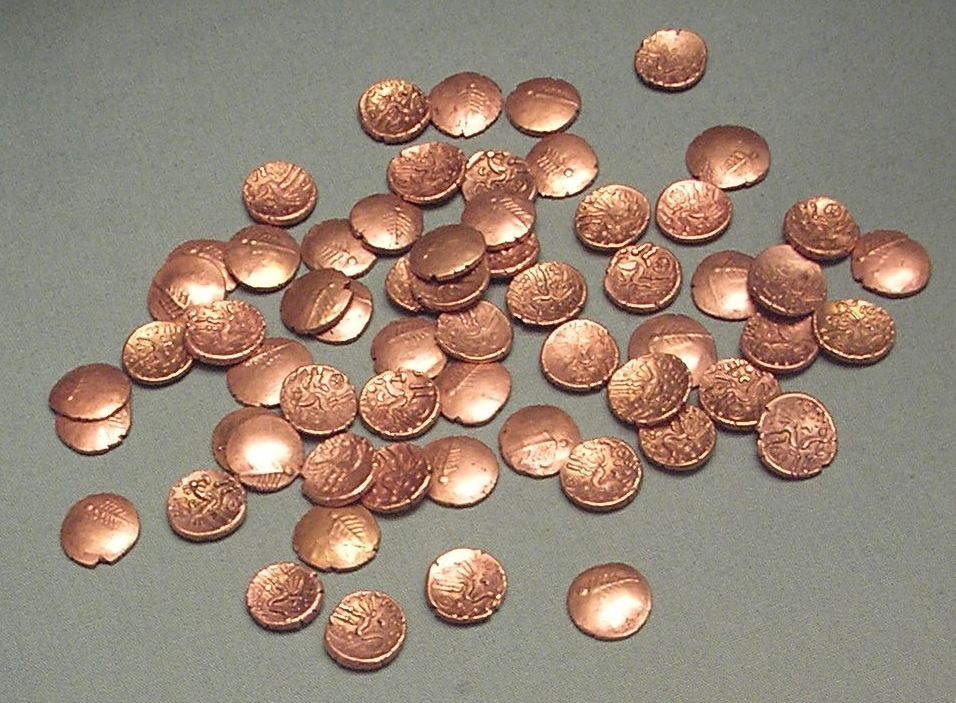
Coins from the Farmborough Hoard, 1st century AD

The Farmborough Hoard of Iron Age coins was found in the village in 1984 and is now in the British Museum.

The parish of Farmborough was part of the Keynsham Hundred, The village has historically been connected with the coal mines of the Somerset coalfield, but these are all now closed.

== Governance ==
At the lower level of local government, Farmborough is a civil parish with a parish council of 9 elected members.

At the upper level, Farmborough is in Bath and North East Somerset, a unitary authority. For elections to the council, since 2019 it has been in Clutton & Farmborough electoral ward, which elects one member to the council. From 1999 to 2019, Farmborough was the name of one of the Bath and North East Somerset electoral wards; in addition to Farmborough parish, it covered a wider area north almost to Keynsham, with a population at the 2011 census of 2,505.

Historically, Farmborough was part of Clutton Rural District between 1894 and 1974, and the Wansdyke district of the county of Avon between 1974 and 1996.

Farmborough is represented in the House of Commons of the Parliament of the United Kingdom as part of North East Somerset and Hanham.

== Demographics ==
At the 2021 census, Farmborough had a population of 1,312 in 567 households.

Census population of Farmborough parish
Census	Population	Female	Male	Households	Source
2001	1,103	549	554	448	
2011	1,035	514	521	454	
2021	1,312	666	646	567	

== Church ==
The Church of All Saints dates from the 15th century and is a grade II* listed building.

In the 13th century John Stafford who later became the Archbishop of Canterbury was the rector of Farmborough.

== Education ==
Farmborough Church of England VC Primary School was built in 1857. In a 2024 Ofsted it was graded as 'good' with 'outstanding' for personal development. In 2007 the local community pre-school playgroup moved into an unused classroom at the school site and a breakfast club was established to assist working parents to leave their children in a safe environment prior to school opening hours. Author Dick King-Smith once taught at the school.

== Notable residents ==
- Anthony Head, actor
- Author Dick King-Smith
- Charles Warrell, creator of the I-Spy children's books; born in Farmborough in 1889
