= Marksbury =

Village and civil parish in Somerset, England

Coordinates: 51.3587°N 2.4790°W

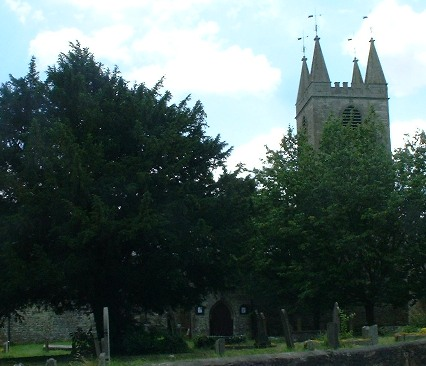
- St Peter's Church, Marksbury

- Location within Somerset
- Interactive map showing parish boundary
- Population: 388 (2021 census)
- OS grid reference: ST666623
- Unitary authority: Bath and North East Somerset
- Ceremonial county: Somerset
- Region: South West
- Country: England
- Sovereign state: United Kingdom
- Post town: Bath
- Postcode district: BA2
- Dialling code: 01761
- Police: Avon and Somerset
- Fire: Avon
- Ambulance: South Western
- UK Parliament: Frome and East Somerset

Marksbury is a small village and civil parish on the eastern edge of the Chew Valley in Somerset, England, about 4 miles (6.4 km) from Keynsham and 7 miles (11.3 km) from Bath on the A39 road where it meets the A368. The parish, which includes the villages of Hunstrete and Stanton Prior, has a population of 388.

== History ==
Stantonbury Camp is the site of an Iron Age hillfort near Stanton Prior. It is a scheduled ancient monument. The hillfort, which is at the top of an isolated outcrop of oolitic limestone, close to the A39 road is on the route of the Wansdyke.

In 926 Æthelstan gave the manor, then spelled Merkesburie, to his son. It was later gifted to Glastonbury Abbey and in one of the Danelaw wars was taken by Danish troops. It was restored to the abbey again after the victory of Edgar the Peaceful.

Marksbury was listed in the Domesday Book of 1086 as Mercesberia. The name of the village is thought to come from Old English either as 'Mǣrec's or Mearc's stronghold' (from an Old English male personal name + burh 'stronghold', 'fortified place', dative byrig), or as 'stronghold on a boundary' (from mearc 'boundary', possibly a reference to the Wansdyke, + burh, byrig).

== Governance ==
At the lower level of local government, Marksbury is a civil parish with a parish council of 7 elected members.

At the upper level, Marksbury is in the unitary authority area of Bath and North East Somerset. For elections to the council, Marksbury is part of the Farmborough Ward, which is represented by one councillor. Bath and North East Somerset's area covers part of the ceremonial county of Somerset but it is administered independently of the non-metropolitan county.

Historically, Marksbury was in the Hundred of Keynsham. From 1894 to 1933, it was in the Keynsham Rural District of the administrative county of Somerset; then from 1933 until 1974, it was in Bathavon Rural District. Between 1974 and 1996, it was the Wansdyke district of the county of Avon.

The parish is represented in the House of Commons of the Parliament of the United Kingdom as part of Frome and East Somerset constituency.

Emergency services are provided by Avon Fire and Rescue Service, Avon and Somerset Constabulary and the Great Western Ambulance Service.

== Demographics ==
At the 2021 census, Marksbury parish had a population of 388 in 163 households.

Census population of Marksbury parish
| Census | Population | Female | Male | Households | Source |
|---|---|---|---|---|---|
| 2001 | 399 | 196 | 203 | 148 | |
| 2011 | 397 | 196 | 201 | 157 | |
| 2021 | 388 | 205 | 183 | 163 | |

According to the 2001 census, the Farmborough electoral ward (which includes Compton Dando, Woollard, Hunstrete, Chewton Keynsham, Saltford and Stanton Prior) had 1,111 residents, living in 428 households, with an average age of 44.5 years. Of these 71% of residents describing their health as 'good', 21% of 16- to 74-year-olds had no qualifications; and the area had an unemployment rate of 1.0% of all economically active people aged 16–74. In the Index of Multiple Deprivation 2004, it was ranked at 22,100 out of 32,482 wards in England, where 1 was the most deprived LSOA and 32,482 the least deprived.

== Church ==
The Church of St Peter, is an ancient structure, with a tower containing six bells. It is believed to be late 12th century in origin but mainly from the 15th century. The tower has three stages; the first stage has diagonal buttresses, a canted stair turret in the return of tower and nave and a very small west door with a canted flat arch under a 2-light, chamfered mullion window dated 1634. The second stage has a cusped 2-light window with heavy louvres to the north, a blocked single light to the east and 2-light chamfered, vaguely pointed windows south and west, contemporary with third stage which has one enormous, round headed window with raised architrave and louvres per side, thin, embattled parapet dominated by four pyramidal pinnacles with vanes. The nave has two 2-light windows under hoodmoulds flanking a blocked, moulded round-headed door under a plaque dated 1627. The buttressed, off-centre chancel has to north one window as elsewhere, 3-light east window of 1875. There are several monuments in the chancel including those to Counsell, 1671, and Wadden, 1682. In the nave is a monument to Boulter 1782, by Brewer of Box. William Counsell was the rector (1662–74). The church is a grade II* listed building. An unidentified monument in the churchyard is also listed.

On Wingsbury Hill are remains of an ancient chapel, probably belonging to a monastery, which formerly existed here.

The parish is part of the benefice of Farmborough with Marksbury and Stanton Prior, Clutton with Cameley, and within the archdeaconry of Bath.

== Education ==
The village has a primary school, Marksbury Church of England Primary School. In July 2024 it was graded as 'good' in an Ofsted inspection.

== Notable residents ==
- Joseph Harding (1805–1876), known for being the "Father of Cheddar Cheese", lived and died in Marksbury.

== Other listed buildings ==
Several houses and farm buildings in Marksbury are grade II listed:

- Historic England. "Church Farmhouse (1136448)". National Heritage List for England.
- Historic England. "Court Farmhouse (1136413)". National Heritage List for England.
- Historic England. "Winsbury House (1129522)". National Heritage List for England.
- Historic England. "No. 123 (1312741)". National Heritage List for England.
- Historic England. "Crispin Cottage (1136484)". National Heritage List for England.
- Historic England. "No. 47 (1320779)". National Heritage List for England.
- Historic England. "May Tree Cottage (1136514)". National Heritage List for England.
- Historic England. "The Cottage (1320780)". National Heritage List for England.
- Historic England. "Badger Cottage (1129526)". National Heritage List for England.
- Historic England. "Barn and attached farm buildings about 30 metres south-east of Poplar Farm (1312733)". National Heritage List for England.
- Historic England. "Becket's Place (formerly Elm Farmhouse) (1312767)". National Heritage List for England.
- Historic England. "Church Farmhouse, Stanton Prior (1136550)". National Heritage List for England.
- Historic England. "Lower Church Farmhouse (1129525)". National Heritage List for England.
- Historic England. "Outbuildings and barn about 15 metres north of Priory Farmhouse (1129529)". National Heritage List for England.
- Historic England. "Poplar Farmhouse (1129530)". National Heritage List for England.
- Historic England. "Pound about 80 metres north-east of Priory Farmhouse (1136589)". National Heritage List for England.
- Historic England. "Priory Farmhouse (1312754)". National Heritage List for England.
- Historic England. "The Cottage (1129531)". National Heritage List for England.
- Historic England. "The Mount (1129524)". National Heritage List for England.
- Historic England. "The Old Rectory (1129528)". National Heritage List for England.
- Historic England. "Whidcombe Farmhouse (1136520)". National Heritage List for England.
