= Stanton Prior =

Village in Somerset, England

Coordinates: 51.3644°N 2.4633°W

- View of Stanton Prior village, August 2007

- Location within Somerset
- Population: 60
- OS grid reference: ST675628
- Civil parish: Marksbury
- Unitary authority: Bath and North East Somerset
- Ceremonial county: Somerset
- Region: South West
- Country: England
- Sovereign state: United Kingdom
- Post town: BATH
- Postcode district: BA2
- Dialling code: 01761
- Police: Avon and Somerset
- Fire: Avon
- Ambulance: South Western
- UK Parliament: Frome and East Somerset

Stanton Prior is a small village within the civil parish of Marksbury, in the Bath and North East Somerset district, in the ceremonial county of Somerset, England. It is set in Duchy of Cornwall countryside between Newton St Loe and Marksbury, 6 miles (9.7 km) west from the UK city of Bath. In 1931 the parish had a population of 85. On 1 April 1933 the parish was abolished and merged with Marksbury.

== History ==
Stanton Prior derives its name from the Old English 'Stantona' (meaning Stone Town) and is reputed to be one of the smallest villages in Somerset, consisting of two farms, 21 houses and the Church of St Lawrence, which has its origins in the 12th century but is mainly 15th century and underwent heavy restoration in 1860. The church has been designated by English Heritage as a Grade II* listed building.

The village was the property of Saxon Kings who gave it to Bath Abbey before the Norman Conquest and it was held by the Prior until the dissolution of the monasteries. It was then granted to Thomas Horner, who sold it to General Erington in 1544. The parish of Stanton Prior was part of the Keynsham Hundred.

Close by, on Stantonbury Hill, are the remains of an Iron Age hill fort known as Stantonbury Camp, which lies on the line of Wansdyke. Stanton is home to a rare chain pump, albeit without its chain.
