= List of scheduled monuments in Bath and North East Somerset =

Bath and North East Somerset shown within Somerset and England

Bath and North East Somerset (commonly referred to as BANES or B&NES) is a unitary authority created on 1 April 1996, following the abolition of the County of Avon, which had existed since 1974. Part of the ceremonial county of Somerset, Bath and North East Somerset occupies an area of 220 square miles (570 km^{2}), two-thirds of which is green belt. It stretches from the outskirts of Bristol, south into the Mendip Hills and east to the southern Cotswold Hills and Wiltshire border. The city of Bath is the principal settlement in the district, but BANES also covers Keynsham, Midsomer Norton, Radstock and the Chew Valley. The area has a population of 170,000, about half of whom live in Bath, making it 12 times more densely populated than the rest of the area.

A scheduled monument is a nationally important archaeological site or monument which is given legal protection by being placed on a list (or "schedule") by the Secretary of State for Culture, Media and Sport; Historic England takes the leading role in identifying such sites. The legislation governing this is the Ancient Monuments and Archaeological Areas Act 1979. The term "monument" can apply to the whole range of archaeological sites, and they are not always visible above ground. Such sites have to have been deliberately constructed by human activity. They range from prehistoric standing stones and burial sites, through Roman remains and medieval structures such as castles and monasteries, to later structures such as industrial sites and buildings constructed for the World Wars or the Cold War.

There are 58 scheduled monuments in Bath and North East Somerset. Some of the oldest are Neolithic, including the Stanton Drew stone circles and several tumuli. The Great Circle at Stanton Drew is one of the largest Neolithic monuments ever built, and the second largest stone circle in Britain (after Avebury). The date of construction is not known but is thought to be between 3000 and 2000 BCE, which places it in the Late Neolithic to Early Bronze Age. There are also several Iron Age hillforts such as Maes Knoll, which was later incorporated into the medieval Wansdyke defensive earthwork, several sections of which are included in this list. The Romano-British period is represented with several sites, most notably the Roman Baths and city walls in Bath. More recent sites include several bridges which date from the Middle Ages to the 18th-century Palladian bridge in Prior Park Landscape Garden. Dundas Aqueduct, built in 1805 to carry the Kennet and Avon Canal, is the most recent site in the list. The monuments are listed below using the names given in the English Heritage data sheets.

== Monuments ==
Name	Location	Type	Completed (Note: The date given is the date used by Historic England as significant for the initial building or that of an important part in the structure's description.)	Grid ref. (Note: The grid reference is based on the British national grid reference system, sometimes known as OSGB36, used by the Ordnance Survey.) Geo-coordinates	Notes	Entry number (Note: The "List Entry Number" is a unique number assigned to each listed building and scheduled monument by Historic England.)	Image	Ref.
Bath city walls	Bath	Defensive wall	Romano-British	ST 74941 64886; 51°22′48″N 2°21′30″W	Bath's first walls were built by the Romans and then extended by the Anglo-Saxons to create a fortified burh.	1007017	Bath city walls	
Bathampton Camp	Bathampton	Univallate hill fort	Iron Age	ST7741965033; 51°23′05″N 2°19′34″W	Bathampton Camp may have been a univallate Iron Age hill fort or stock enclosure. A rectangular enclosure, which is approximately 650 metres (2,133 ft) (east-west) by 500 metres (1,640 ft) (north-south), has been identified which may be a Medieval earthwork.	1002480	Bathampton Camp	
Bathford Bridge	Bathford	Bridge	1665	ST 78651 67004; 51°24′06″N 2°18′30″W	A stone arched bridge, which was built in 1665, carrying the A363, over the Bybrook River close to its confluence with the River Avon.	1004515	Bathford Bridge	
Bowl barrow, Hinton Charterhouse	Hinton Charterhouse	Bowl barrow	Late Neolithic to Bronze Age	ST 77098 59208; 51°19′53″N 2°19′48″W	The barrow is 74 yards (68 m) in circumference and 1.2 metres (3 ft 11 in) high. Roman coins have been found at the site.	1002474	Upload Photo	
Bowl barrow 90 m south-west of Bicknell Farm	Nempnett Thrubwell	Bowl barrow	Iron Age	ST 51641 62732; 51°21′41″N 2°41′46″W	The bowl barrow is 26 metres (85 ft) in diameter and 2 metres (6 ft 7 in) high. In the middle Ages a windmill was built on the mound.	1008294	Upload Photo	
Bowl barrow 400 m west of Bellevue House	Nempnett Thrubwell	Bowl barrow	Late Neolithic to Bronze Age	ST 51234 60246; 51°20′21″N 2°42′05″W	This barrow is 12 metres (39 ft) in diameter and 1.2 metres (3 ft 11 in) high. It was surrounded by a ditch but this has been filled in.	1008183	Upload Photo	
Bridge at Stanton Drew	Stanton Drew	Bridge	13th or 14th century	ST 59679 63444; 51°22′07″N 2°34′51″W	A stone bridge, with two pointed arches, over the River Chew.	1004519	Bridge at Stanton Drew	
Camerton Romano-British town and associated Prehistoric and early medieval monuments	Camerton	Vicus	Romano-British	ST 68646 56623; 51°18′20″N 2°27′01″W	The site of a small Romano-British settlement. There is also evidence of prehistoric and medieval use.	1013881	Upload Photo	
Chewton Keynsham packhorse bridge	Chewton Keynsham	Packhorse bridge	Middle Ages	ST 65465 66437; 51°23′45″N 2°29′52″W	A stone two arch bridge over the River Chew.	1004518	Chewton Keynsham packhorse bridge	
Churchyard cross in St Andrew's churchyard	Chew Magna	Cross	15th century	ST 57674 63198; 51°22′00″N 2°36′35″W	A limestone cross, from which the head is missing, on an octagonal base with six steps.	1017570	Churchyard cross in St Andrew's churchyard More images	
Compton Dando Bridge	Compton Dando	Bridge	Late Middle Ages	ST 64701 64686; 51°22′48″N 2°30′31″W	A stone bridge with three arches, over the River Chew.	1004517	Compton Dando Bridge	
Culverhay Castle	Englishcombe	Ringwork	11th to 13th century	ST 71906 63018; 51°22′00″N 2°24′15″W	A ringwork ditch and bank, up to 5 feet (1.5 m) deep. During the first half of the 13th century a stone circular keep and low curtain wall was built at the castle.	1006992	Culverhay Castle More images	
Deserted medieval farmstead NE of Northwick	Norton Malreward	Earthwork	Middle Ages	ST 59148 66175; 51°23′38″N 2°35′23″W	Traces of several buildings form the 13th and 14th century have been identified. The site was reoccupied in the 18th century.	1004524	Upload Photo	
Dundas Aqueduct	Monkton Combe	Aqueduct	1805	ST 78460 62533; 51°21′42″N 2°18′38″W	Built between 1797 and 1801, the Dundas Aqueduct carries the Kennet and Avon Canal over the River Avon and the Wessex Main Line railway. It is 150 yards (137.2 m) long with three arches built of Bath Stone, with Doric pilasters, and balustrades at each end.	1005631	Dundas Aqueduct More images	
Eastgate, Bath	Bath	City walls	Middle Ages	ST 75173 64872; 51°22′56″N 2°21′29″W	The only one of the medieval gates into the city which has survived.	1007018	Eastgate, Bath	
Fairy Toot	Nempnett Thrubwell	Long barrow	Neolithic	ST 52056 61808; 51°21′13″N 2°41′29″W	The Fairy Toot is an extensive oval barrow of the Severn-Cotswold tomb type which consist of precisely-built, long trapezoid earth mounds covering a burial chamber.	1008181	Upload Photo	
Hautville's Quoit	Stanton Drew	Recumbent stone	Neolithic	ST 60169 63795; 51°22′17″N 2°34′31″W	A (now recumbent) standing stone close to the Stanton Drew stone circles. It was described by William Stukeley in 1723 as being 13 feet (4.0 m) long, it is now about half that length.	1002475	Upload Photo	
Hinton Priory	Hinton Charterhouse	Priory	1232	ST 77806 59157; 51°19′50″N 2°19′17″W	A Carthusian priory established in the 13th century and suppressed as part of the dissolution of the monasteries in 1539. The chapter house, prior's cell and refectory survive as agricultural buildings belonging to the sixteenth century mansion, Hinton Abbey. Surviving earthworks from the great cloister are still visible in an orchard and paddocks.	1007014	Hinton Priory	
Iford Bridge	Freshford & Hinton Charterhouse	Bridge	c. 1400	ST 80023 58896; 51°19′44″N 2°17′17″W	A stone bridge with two arches carrying a minor road over the River Frome.	1007007	Iford Bridge	
Keynsham Abbey	Keynsham	Abbey	1170	ST 65599 68821; 51°25′02″N 2°29′46″W	The abbey was founded around 1170 and survived until 1539. After the dissolution the site was occupied by a house which was itself demolished in 1776.	1005416	Keynsham Abbey More images	
Lansdown camp	Charlcombe	Earthwork	Possibly Iron Age	ST 72123 69866; 51°25′37″N 2°24′10″W	The remains of a bank and ditch from the Iron Age which was probably a stock enclosure.	1002482	Upload Photo	
Large irregular stone circle at Stanton Drew south east of Church Farm	Stanton Drew	Stone circle	Neolithic	ST 59919 63070; 51°21′55″N 2°34′37″W	The largest stone circle is the Great Circle, 113 metres (371 ft) in diameter and the second largest stone circle in Britain (after Avebury).	1007915	Large irregular stone circle at Stanton Drew south east of Church Farm More images	
Large univallate hillfort with outworks 800 m west of White Cross	West Harptree	Univallate hill fort	Iron Age	ST 58247 58497; 51°19′33″N 2°35′34″W	A univallate Iron Age hillfort which has been investigated three times. In 1955 by the University of Bristol Spelaeological Society archaeologists found evidence of postholes, ditches, and pits inside the fort.	1004526	Large univallate hillfort with outworks 800 m west of White Cross	
Large univallate hillfort with a bowl barrow and pillow mounds 970 m west of The Bungalow	North Stoke	Univallate hill fort	Iron Age	ST 70885 68879; 51°25′06″N 2°25′12″W	A hill fort, containing bowl barrows and pillow mounds, surrounded by a bank and ditch, which are now buried.	1004677	Large univallate hillfort with a bowl barrow and pillow mounds 970 m west of The Bungalow	
Lock Up, Monkton Combe	Monkton Combe	Village lock-up	18th century	ST 77358 61957; 51°21′22″N 2°19′34″W	A small stone building with a domed roof. Probably built around 1776.	1004541	Lock Up, Monkton Combe	
Maes Knoll	Norton Malreward	Hill fort	Iron Age	ST 60001 65961; 51°23′32″N 2°34′32″W	The hillfort, which is approximately 390 by 84 feet (119 m × 26 m), and 45 feet (14 m) in height, covering 20 acres (8.1 ha), consists of a fairly large flat open area, roughly triangular in shape, that has been fortified by ramparts and shaping of the steep-sided hilltop around the northern, eastern and southwestern sides of the hill. It rises to an altitude of 197 metres (646 ft) above sea level.	1005424	Maes Knoll More images	
Newton St Loe Castle	Newton St Loe	Fortified manor house	12th century	ST 69408 64003; 51°22′27″N 2°26′27″W	Originally built as a fortified manor house, probably in the 12th century, surrounded by Newton Park, then a medieval deer park. At the start of the 14th century, a keep was built on the site, creating a rectangular, courtyard castle with four corner towers, protected by a ditch on three sides.	1006993	Newton St Loe Castle More images	
Oval enclosure, possibly Iron Age, SW of Stowey House	Stowey	Ringwork	Iron Age	ST 59738 59287; 51°19′52″N 2°34′45″W	The ringwork has a 3 metres (9.8 ft) wide bank and 7 metres (23 ft) wide ditch. There is limited evidence that it was the site of a castle.	1004606	Oval enclosure, possibly Iron Age, SW of Stowey House	
Palladian Bridge, Prior Park, Bath	Prior Park Landscape Garden	Bridge	1750s	ST 76076 63326; 51°22′07″N 2°20′42″W	The bridge crosses a dam between two lakes. It is copied from a similar bridge at Wilton House and has a pulvinated frieze.	1004514	Palladian Bridge, Prior Park, Bath	
Part of the linear boundary known as the Wansdyke 425 m south of New Barn Farm	Norton Malreward	Earthwork	Prehistoric but modified in the Early Middle Ages	ST6103865517; 51°23′14″N 2°33′41″W	A bank and ditch. Part of the surviving remains of the Wansdyke.	1003066	Part of the linear boundary known as the Wansdyke 425 m south of New Barn Farm	
Part of the linear boundary known as the Wansdyke: section E of Maes Knoll camp	Norton Malreward	Earthwork	Prehistoric but modified in the Early Middle Ages	ST 60361 65898; 51°23′27″N 2°34′16″W	A bank and ditch. Part of the surviving remains of the Wansdyke.	1007009	Part of the linear boundary known as the Wansdyke: section E of Maes Knoll camp	
Part of the linear boundary known as the Wansdyke 585 m north of Tuckingmill Farm	Compton Dando	Earthwork	Prehistoric but modified in the Early Middle Ages	ST 65393 64400, 51°22′47″N 2°30′14″W	A bank and ditch. Part of the surviving remains of the Wansdyke.	1007004	Part of the linear boundary known as the Wansdyke 585 m north of Tuckingmill Farm	
Part of the linear boundary known as the Wansdyke 210 m north west of Cottles	Publow	Earthwork	Prehistoric but modified in the Early Middle Ages	ST 62219 65263; 51°23′07″N 2°32′51″W	A bank and ditch. Part of the surviving remains of the Wansdyke.	1007010	Part of the linear boundary known as the Wansdyke 210 m north west of Cottles	
Part of the linear boundary known as the Wansdyke 375 m south east of Knowle Farm	Compton Dando	Earthwork	Prehistoric but modified in the Early Middle Ages	ST6446664935; 51°22′56″N 2°30′43″W	A bank and ditch. Part of the surviving remains of the Wansdyke.	1004523	Part of the linear boundary known as the Wansdyke 375 m south east of Knowle Farm	
Part of the linear boundary known as the Wansdyke 420 m south west of Barrowmead Cottage	Englishcombe	Earthwork	Prehistoric but modified in the Early Middle Ages	ST7268162210; 51°21′30″N 2°23′37″W	A bank and ditch. Part of the surviving remains of the Wansdyke.	1007005	Part of the linear boundary known as the Wansdyke 420 m south west of Barrowmead Cottage	
Part of the linear boundary known as the Wansdyke 285 m north west of Manor Farm	Englishcombe	Earthwork	Prehistoric but modified in the Early Middle Ages	ST 71306 62936; 51°21′56″N 2°25′06″W	A bank and ditch. Part of the surviving remains of the Wansdyke.	1007006	Part of the linear boundary known as the Wansdyke 285 m north west of Manor Farm	
Part of the linear boundary known as the Wansdyke 530 m north west of Park Farm	Newton St Loe	Earthwork	Prehistoric but modified in the Early Middle Ages	ST6890363597; 51°22′10″N 2°26′29″W	A bank and ditch. Part of the surviving remains of the Wansdyke.	1007008	Upload Photo	
Part of the linear boundary known as the Wansdyke: section 1230 yd (1120 m) eastwards from Burnt House Inn	Bath	Earthwork	Prehistoric but modified in the Early Middle Ages	ST 74053 61803; 51°21′17″N 2°22′26″W	A bank and ditch. Part of the surviving remains of the Wansdyke.	1007003	Part of the linear boundary known as the Wansdyke: section 1230 yd (1120 m) eastwards from Burnt House Inn	
Part of a Roman road 565 m north of Abbey Farm	Hinton Charterhouse	Earthwork	Romano-British	ST 77083 59521; 51°20′03″N 2°19′49″W	The remains of a Roman road part of which is visible as an Earthwork; however some sections are only visible as crop marks on aerial photographs.	1005421	Upload Photo	
Queen Charlton village cross	Queen Charlton	Cross	15th century	ST 63418 67057; 51°24′06″N 2°31′38″W	A stone cross on a base with five steps.	1015510	Queen Charlton village cross	
Richmont Castle	East Harptree	Earthwork	11th century	ST 56137 55835; 51°18′00″N 2°37′44″W	The 11th century castle had a single bailey on the south side, possibly making use of an existing Iron Age fortification. Later an inner bailey was added and a circular keep surrounded by a park. The castle was ruined and abandoned by the 1540s and little apart from earthworks are visible today.	1006991	Richmont Castle	
Roman Baths and site of Roman town, Bath	Bath	Baths	Romano-British	ST 74846 64803; 51°22′51″N 2°21′34″W	A Roman site for public bathing which used natural warm springs and surrounding buildings. All of the Roman features are now beneath street level. The buildings above street level date from the 19th century.	1004678	Roman Baths and site of Roman town, Bath More images	
Roman camp 405 m west of The Bungalow	North Stoke	Earthwork	Romano-British	ST7142968918; 51°25′07″N 2°24′44″W	A rectangular enclosure approximately 100 metres (330 ft) long and 55 metres (180 ft) wide internally, surrounded by a 1 metre (3 ft 3 in) high stony bank.	1005422	Roman camp 405 m west of The Bungalow	
Roman Settlement at Keynsham Hams, former Cadbury's Factory	Keynsham	Roman villa	Romano-British	ST6535769411; 51°25′23″N 2°29′41″W	The remains of a Roman settlement, most of which is now beneath ground level. It is within the grounds of an early-20th-century industrial site.	1416459	Roman Settlement at Keynsham Hams, former Cadbury's Factory	
Roman villa at Upper Hayes	Wellow	Earthwork	Romano-British	ST7142968918; 51°19′13″N 2°23′29″W	The site of a Roman villa which had two corridors, mosaics, hypocausts and baths is bow marked by posts in the ground. A relief from the site is now in the British Museum. The site is on the English Heritage list of Heritage at Risk.	1007002	Upload Photo	
Romano-British settlement E of Sir Bevil Granville's Monument	Charlcombe	Earthwork	Romano-British	ST7245870244; 51°25′50″N 2°23′51″W	The site of a Roman settlement or temple and associated buildings possibly used for iron and pewter manufacture. Several stone coffins were found at or near the site. The earthworks of the site are visible in aerial photographs.	1004527	Romano-British settlement E of Sir Bevil Granville's Monument	
Round House, Pensford	Pensford	Village lock-up	18th century	ST 61993 63762; 51°22′18″N 2°32′50″W	An octagonal eighteenth-century village lock-up.	1005423	Round House, Pensford More images	
Saltford Brass Mill	Saltford	Brass mill	1720s	ST 68724 67011; 51°24′04″N 2°27′04″W	The site includes a battery mill and a complete annealing furnace. There are also the remains of the water wheels initially used to power the machinery, one of which is still in working order. The battery mills were supplemented by rolling mills between 1760 and 1830. The mill ceased production in 1924.	1004607	Saltford Brass Mill	
Sir Bevil Grenville's Monument	Lansdown Hill	Monument	1720	ST 72190 70345; 51°25′53″N 2°23′58″W	Erected in 1720 to commemorate the heroism of the Civil War Royalist commander Sir Bevil Grenville who on 5 July 1643 fell mortally wounded at the Battle of Lansdowne. The monument is of ashlar stone masonry, 25 feet (7.6 m) high, in the English Baroque style.	1015110	Sir Bevil Grenville's Monument More images	
Slight univallate hillfort 190 m north west of Westleigh	Batheaston	Univallate hill fort	Iron Age	ST 76856 67925; 51°24′36″N 2°20′03″W	Solsbury Hill is a small flat-topped hill and the site of an Iron Age hill fort occupied between 300 BC and 100 BC. The rampart was 20 feet (6 m) wide and the outer face was at least 12 feet (4 m) high. It is a possible location of the Battle of Badon. It was acquired by the National Trust in 1930. People protesting against the building of an A46 bypass road cut a small turf maze into the hill. It is also the inspiration for rock musician Peter Gabriel's first solo single in 1977.	1002481	Slight univallate hillfort 190 m north west of Westleigh More images	
Slight univallate hillfort 125 m west of Tunley Farm	Camerton	Univallate hill fort	Late Bronze Age to Iron Age	ST 68346 59176; 51°19′51″N 2°27′21″W	The site of a Univallate hill fort. Some earthworks remain as a bank and ditch.	1004525	Upload Photo	
Stantonbury camp and adjacent sections of Wansdyke	Stanton Prior	Hill fort	Iron Age	ST 67450 63711; 51°22′15″N 2°28′20″W	The hillfort, which is at the top of an isolated outcrop of Oolitic Limestone, is on the route of the Wansdyke. Several iron agricultural implements, recovered from the site, including blades of sickles or pruning hooks and the iron tip from an ard, are now in the collection of the British Museum. The site is on the English Heritage Heritage at Risk Register as being in danger of deterioration because of extensive animal burrowing.	1002487	Stantonbury camp and adjacent sections of Wansdyke	
Stone cove at Stanton Drew 25 m south west of St Mary's Church	Stanton Drew	Standing stone	Neolithic	ST 59750 63100; 51°21′56″N 2°34′47″W	a cove of two standing stones with a recumbent slab between them, which can be found in the garden of the Druid's Arms public house. All are of different heights, the stone to the north east being 4.4 metres (14 ft) the south western 3.1 metres (10 ft), and the north eastern 1.4 metres (4 ft 7 in). The stones of The Cove are mineralogically different from those in the nearby Stanton Drew stone circles. A long barrow burial chamber has been found under the stones of The Cove. It is thought that this predates the erection of the stones by approximately a thousand years.	1007916	Stone cove at Stanton Drew 25 m south west of St Mary's Church More images	
Stoney Littleton Long Barrow	Wellow	Long barrow	Neolithic	ST 73492 57208; 51°18′48″N 2°22′53″W	A Neolithic chambered tomb with multiple burial chambers, of the Severn-Cotswold tomb type. The barrow is about 30 metres (98 ft) in length and 15 metres (49 ft) wide at the south-east end, it stands nearly 3 metres (10 ft) high. Internally it consists of a 12.8 metres (42 ft) long gallery with three pairs of side chambers and an end chamber. There is a fossil ammonite decorating the left-hand doorjamb.	1007910	Stoney Littleton Long Barrow More images	
Two stone circles and two stone avenues at Stanton Drew, east of Court Farm	Stanton Drew	Henge	Neolithic	ST 60034 63272; 51°22′04″N 2°34′31″W	The largest stone circle is the Great Circle, 113 metres (371 ft) in diameter. The date of construction is not known but is thought to be between 3000 and 2000 BCE. The Great Circle was surrounded by a ditch and is accompanied by smaller stone circles to the north east and south west. Some of the stones are still vertical, but the majority are now recumbent and some are no longer present.	1007911	Two stone circles and two stone avenues at Stanton Drew, east of Court Farm More images	
Tun Bridge	Chew Magna	Bridge	15th century	ST 57693 62905; 51°21′49″N 2°36′33″W	A 15th century stone bridge with three pointed arches. It carries a minor round over the River Chew.	1004516	Tun Bridge	
Two round barrows north of Blathwayt Arms	Charlcombe	Round barrows	Bronze Age	ST 72520 68706; 51°24′59″N 2°23′46″W	Some earthwork remains of bowl barrows, highest of which is 2 metres (6 ft 7 in) high.	1002471	Upload Photo	
Ubley Manor House	Ubley	Earthwork	14th century	ST 52904 58338; 51°19′15″N 2°40′31″W	Some walling remains from a 14th century manor house which was largely demolished in the 20th century.	1004543	Upload Photo	

== See also ==
- Scheduled monuments in Somerset
- Grade I listed buildings in Bath and North East Somerset
- Grade II* listed buildings in Bath and North East Somerset
