= St Peter's Church, Camerton Park =

Church in Somerset, England

Church of St Peter
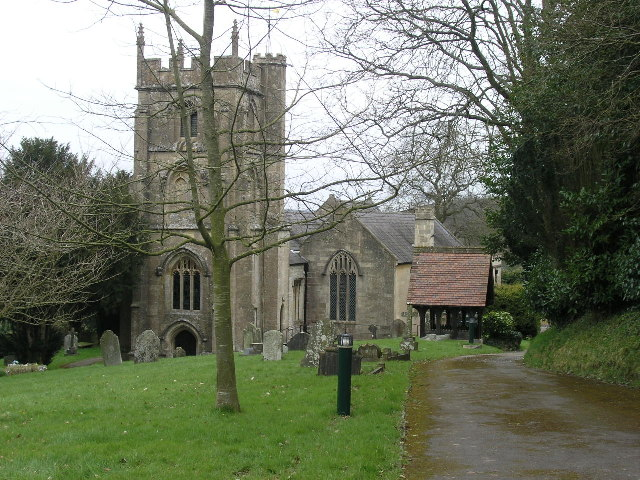

- Location within Somerset
- 51.3151°N 2.4505°W
- Location: Camerton, Somerset, England

History
- Built: 15th century

Listed Building – Grade I
- Official name: Church of St Peter
- Designated: 1 February 1956
- Reference no.: 1129514

The Church of St Peter at Camerton Park in Camerton, Somerset, England was built in the 15th century and has been designated as a Grade I listed building.

From 1800 to 1839 the vicar was the archaeologist John Skinner. He excavated numerous antiquities, especially barrows, such as those at Priddy and Stoney Littleton; and he made visits for antiquarian purposes to many places. His journals (1803–34), published many years after his death, are preserved at the British Library. Skinner committed suicide by shooting himself in 1839, despite which he may have been buried in consecrated ground at Camerton.

In the early 19th century the church still had a medieval nave and chancel which Skinner started to extend. This was revised by Thomas Garner in 1892 by the family of John Jarrett, the lord of the manor. The north chapel was built in 1638 by the Carew family and still remains. There are several monuments to members of the Carew and Lansdown families within the church.

The parish is part of the benefice of Timsbury with Priston, Camerton and Dunkerton within the deanery of Midsomer Norton.

== See also ==
- List of Grade I listed buildings in Bath and North East Somerset
- List of towers in Somerset
- List of ecclesiastical parishes in the Diocese of Bath and Wells
