= Fairy Toot =

Chambered long barrow in Somerset, England

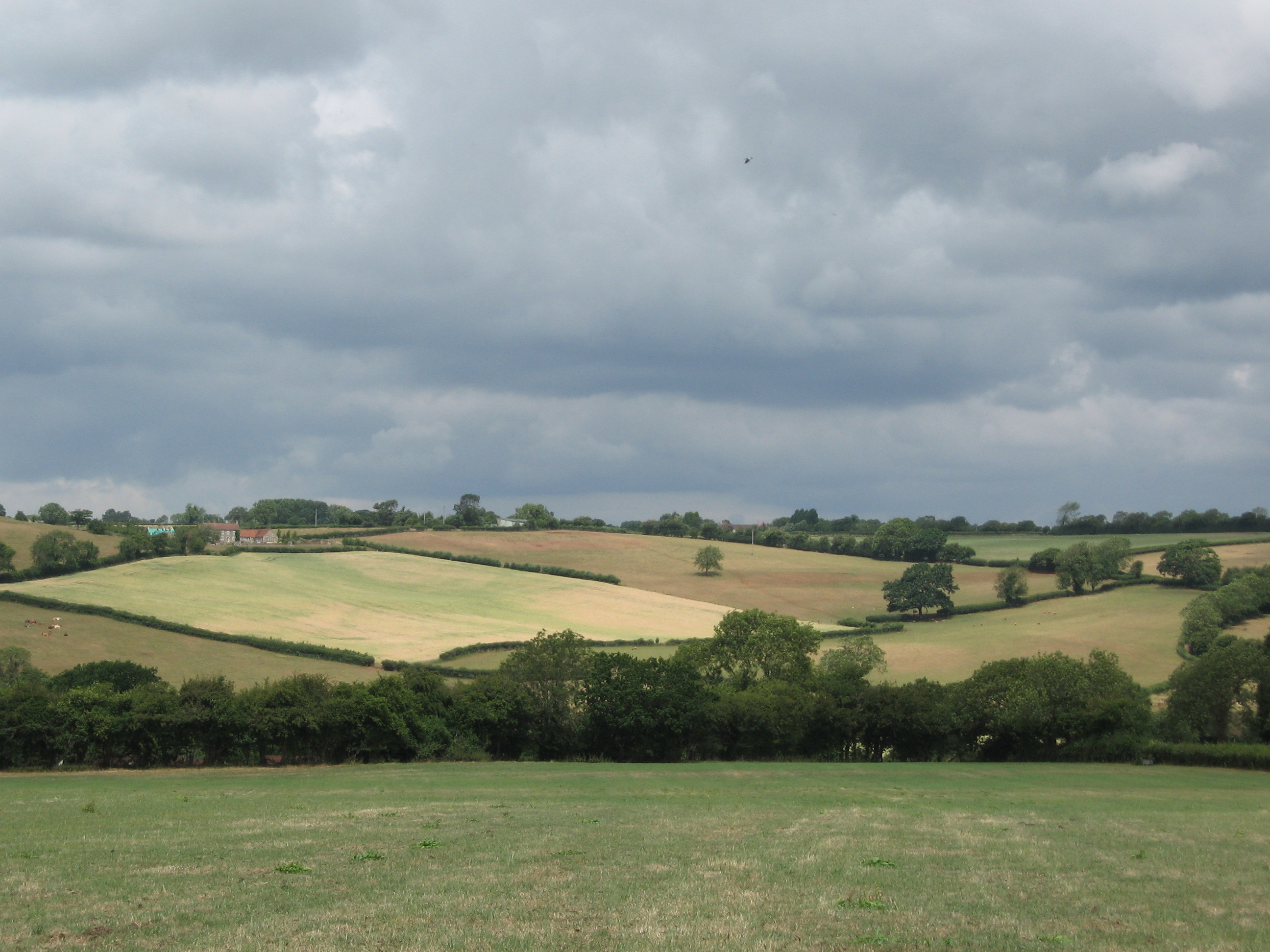
- Fairy Toot Field

- Location within Somerset
- 51.353117°N 2.689946°W
- Type: oval barrow
- Location: near Nempnett Thrubwell and Bristol
- Region: Somerset, England

Site notes
- Condition: some damage

The Fairy Toot is an extensive oval barrow in the civil parish of Nempnett Thrubwell, Somerset, England (grid reference ST520618).

It is an example of the Severn-Cotswold tomb type which consist of precisely-built, long trapezoid earth mounds covering a burial chamber. Because of this they are a type of chambered long barrow.

Fairy Toot was formerly a chambered cairn which is a Scheduled Ancient Monument. Located south-southwest of Howgrove Farm, it is a mound 60 m long, 25 m wide and now 2.5 m high, retained by a stone wall. Its summit is covered with ash trees and shrubs. Formerly it was considerably higher.

On being opened and essentially destroyed between 1787 and 1835 by the Reverend Thomas Bere of Butcombe and the Reverend John Skinner of Camerton, it was found to contain two rows of cells, running from south to north, formed by immense stones set edgeways, and covered by others of larger dimensions. A human skull from the barrow is now in the Bristol Museum and Art Gallery.

At the time it was conjectured to be a work of the Druids, but its origins are far older and probably date from the Neolithic period.

Wade and Wade in their 1929 book "Somerset" described it as "a remarkably fine tumulus of masonry, said to have been one of the finest in Britain, in the chambers of which skeletons have been discovered. A few vestiges of it now only remain, the rest has been used as a lime-kiln."

The site was visited in the past as it was known as a place for curing warts.
