= Bill Bailey (surfer) =

British surfing pioneer

Bill Bailey (27 September 1933 – 28 April 2009) was known as "the father of British surfing" for the crucial role he played in the development of the sport in the United Kingdom. He set up the first surf company in Britain.

Bailey grew up in Inglesbatch, in Somerset where his father withdrew him from school at age 14 due to his behaviour, and placed him in the Royal Air Force. There he trained as an engineer working on Short Sunderland flying boats and taking postings overseas. It was while working on air-sea rescue in Sri Lanka that he developed a love of the sea, quitting the air-force at the end of the 1950s and moving to Newquay to work as a lifeguard.

Bailey began building life-saving equipment including a surf ski in 1961, designed to be used by lifeguards with paddles. While tinkering with the design he met two Australians on their way to the US, and was impressed with the foam core and fibre-glass construction of their surf boards. He bought one and learned to use it, becoming one of the first native surfers in Britain. In 1964 he began constructing surf boards himself and the following year formed a partnership with Bob Head to set up the European Surfing Company. Under its surfboard brand, BilBo, it produced around 12,000 boards over the next eight years. In the late 1960s A Bilbo shop was opened outside the train station of Newquay, which was quickly becoming the UK surfing capital.
