= St Peter's Church, Englishcombe =

Church of St Peter, Englishcombe
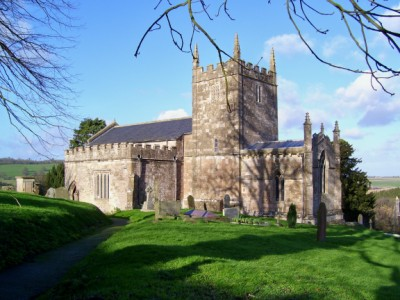
- St Peter's church seen from the southeast

- Location within Somerset
- 51°21′50″N 2°24′31″W
- Location: Englishcombe, Somerset
- Country: England
- Denomination: Church of England

History
- Founded: 12th century
- Dedication: Saint Peter

Architecture
- Heritage designation: Grade I Listed
- Designated: 1 February 1956
- Style: Norman, Decorated, Perpendicular

Administration
- Province: Canterbury
- Diocese: Bath and Wells

The Church of St Peter is the Church of England parish church of Englishcombe, Somerset, England. It is a Grade I listed building.

== History ==
St Peter's was probably built for Robert de Gournay in the 12th century. The church was given to the Cluniac Priory of Bermondsey in 1112 by the Lady Hawisia de Gournay, and by the Cluniacs to the monks of Bath in 1239.

The church has Norman arches and leper holes in the porch, which would have enabled lepers to hear the sermon without coming into contact with the rest of the congregation. On either side of the chancel are corbel tables depicting animals and people.

The parish is in the benefice of Bath St Barnabas with Englishcombe.

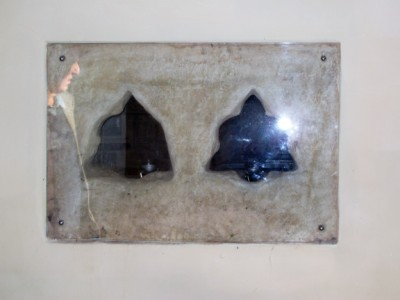
Leper holes in St Peter's church

== See also ==
- Grade I listed buildings in Bath and North East Somerset
- List of Somerset towers
- List of ecclesiastical parishes in the Diocese of Bath and Wells
