= Katherine Evans and Sarah Cheevers =

Katherine Evans (1618–1692) and Sarah Cheevers (1608–1664) were English Quaker activists who were held captive during the Roman Inquisition in Malta, between December 1658 and August 1663. During and after their captivity, Evans and Cheevers published several books that were critical of the Catholic Church and the Inquisition and promoted their own Quaker beliefs.

== Life and family ==
Not much is known about the early lives of Evans and Cheevers. However, by the time of their arrest, both Evans and Cheevers were married with children. They did not have extensive educations, but did know how to read and write fluently. This was not unusual for middle-class women in the interregnum period.

Neither Evans nor Cheevers left full documentation of their conversion to Quakerism, but were both missionaries in Scotland by 1653. They did not yet know each other. By 1655, Evans encountered her first trouble with the law when she was banished from the Isle of Wight. Later in 1655, with other prominent Quaker activists, she was put on trial and eventually imprisoned for visiting Quaker prisoners.

John and Katherine Evans had several children, and lived in Inglesbatch near Bath, England. John Evans was a Quaker minister, and appeared to share Katherine's religious fervour, as indicated by letters that she wrote while in jail that referenced religion strongly. She urged her family to respond to "a holy calling." Letters from Katherine to John also indicate they had a strong, affectionate relationship, with Katherine referring to John with such terms of endearment as "my right dear and precious husband" and "my dear heart".

Henry Cheevers was the husband of Sarah Cheevers and the father of her children. The Cheevers family was settled in Slaughterford, Wiltshire. Henry Cheever's religious beliefs are unclear, though in some letters Sarah seems to be attempting to persuade him towards Quakerism. She wrote, "I am a witness of... the messengers of Christ, who [are]... directing you where you may find your saviour to purge and cleanse you from your sins, and to reconcile you to his Father." Some historians believe this may indicate that her husband and children were not practising Quakers, but Protestants of another denomination. Though families generally shared the same religious beliefs, various forms of Protestantism were popular in England in the period immediately after the English Civil War.

Private writings by both Evans and Cheevers indicate that their dedication did not preclude or interfere with their duties as a wife or mother. It was not unusual for women in the mid-17th century to show deep devotion to religion, and mothers were often responsible for teaching and raising children according to the basic tenets of their religion. So some scholars believe it is possible that Evans and Cheevers viewed their journey as an extension as their accepted roles as devoted Christian wives. Quaker marriages were exceptional for the 17th century in viewing spouses as "spiritual equals" and allowing each marriage partner to explore and advocate his or her own faiths.

The religious dedication exhibited by Cheevers and Evans was not entirely unusual for women of the 17th century. Women religious communities were somewhat common, such as nunneries or sisterhood organizations, though they were in the decline by the middle of the century.

== Relationship ==
Before embarking on their journey, Evans and Cheevers did not know each other. On separate occasions, they sensed that God had appeared to them and told them they should travel to Alexandria, Egypt, to determine the next leg of their respective religious journeys. In late 1657, Cheevers was 50 years old and Katherine about 40 years old. Upon their introduction through a London-based Quaker community, they decided to make their journeys together, and quickly formed a devoted relationship.

Though friendships among women were not uncommon in the mid-17th century, Evans and Cheevers experienced an unusually close relationship, to which they attributed the emotional and spiritual strength they sustained throughout their imprisonment:

And they told us, the Inquisitor would have us separated, because I was weak, and I should go into a cooler room; but Sarah should abide there. I took her by the arm, and said, The Lord hath joined us together, and wo be to them that should part us. I said, I rather chuse to dye there with my friend, than to part from her. He was smitten, and went away, and came no more in five weeks.... They did not part us till ten Weeks after: But oh the dark clouds and the sharp showers the Lord did carry us through! Death it self had been better than to have parted in that place.

Evans and Cheevers referred to their relationship as a "marriage". Though some historians believe this was done in an attempt to mirror every Quaker's marriage to God, as other Quakers sometimes employed the same language, but other commentators have inferred from their relationship the existence of lesbianism in Early Modern England. Some have seen this as supported by their use of the plural "we" without further identifying the identity of the person speaking or writing. For example,

He asked, How we did believe the Resurrection? We answered, We did believe that the just and the unjust should arise, according to the Scriptures.... He asked, if we believed in Purgatory? We said, No; but a Heaven and a Hell.... He asked, if we believed their holy Sacrament? We said, We never read (the Word) Sacrament in Scripture....

Other historians argue that the Cheevers and Evans relationship was not uncommon for the era – that same-sex friendships were formed particularly among missionaries. They argue that their friendship was indicative only of the importance which early Quaker communities placed on the relationships between Friends.

== Arrest and captivity ==
The transit from England to Turkey was difficult and slowed by multiple storms, so that the captain decided to go to Malta: "Oh, we have a dreadful cup to drink at that place!"

Evans and Cheevers arrived in Malta on 21 December 1658. At that time, Malta was a country under the control of the Catholic church, which strictly forbade women from preaching any religious message. Hostility against Quaker beliefs and more specifically women Quakers, was not specific to Malta. Back in England, Quakerism had been branded as "tumultuous", and efforts had been taken to suppress Quaker gatherings and preaching. This contributed to the common strain of resistance against oppression that dominates many prominent Quaker texts, including those of Evans and Cheevers. Such intolerance continued in Malta, and when Evans and Cheevers began to distribute Quaker texts in Latin and French (some sources say English and Spanish), they drew attention from the Maltese Inquisitor, Girolamo Casanate.

Arrested for preaching and distributing Quaker literature, Evans and Cheevers were put under house arrest with the English consul from December 1658 to February/April 1659. In 1659, under the orders of Cardinal Barberini they were removed from their place of residence to a local prison. While in prison, Evans and Cheevers resisted repeated efforts to convert them to Catholicism and continued to write and preach about their religious beliefs, despite bouts with illness, starvation/fasting, isolation, restraints, and continual interrogation. The women were intentionally treated as if they were insane, to discredit their ideas and activism. This resistance continued even after they were separated with the intention of breaking their resolve. Indeed this seemed to strengthen it:

They said, we corrupted each other, and that they thought when we were parted, we would have bowed to them. But they found we were more stronger afterwards than we were before; the Lord our God did fit us for every condition.

Prison officials tried several times to remove the writing tools Evans and Cheevers possessed, but were ultimately unsuccessful in keeping them from producing multiple works and letters that criticized their treatment and the Catholic Church, and considered the tenets of Quakerism.

During their incarceration, many prominent Quaker leaders attempted to intervene on their behalf, including George Fox, but this was unsuccessful except in one case. Prior to a visit, fellow travelling Quaker missionary, Daniel Baker, experienced an angel appearing to him and telling him of their situation. He went to visit them and to offer himself up as a prisoner in exchange for their freedom, but this was denied. Instead, he made efforts to deliver to England letters and works the women had written. These he only managed to obtain when they were thrown out of a window to him; they were initially intercepted, but he managed to make copies for the prison and keep the originals. Baker continued in his travels, but returned to England to publish their writings in 1662. Evans and Cheevers appreciated this and referred to Baker in terms such as "Our dear Brother". Historians are unsure about the extent to which Baker edited or altered Evans and Cheever's originals, but most agree that his influence was largely inconsequential.

== Works ==
While in prison, Evans and Cheevers produced many letters and a narrative under the title This is a Short Relation of some of the Cruel Sufferings (for the Truths Sake) of Katharine Evans & Sarah Cheevers in the Inquisition in the Isle of Malta published in 1662. In 1663, Evans and Cheevers also published A True Account of the Great Tryals and Cruel Sufferings Undergone by Those Two Faithful Servants of God, Katherine Evans and Sarah Cheevers, in the Time of Their above Three Years and a Half's Confinement in the Island Malta, which included a narrative of their release and their journey home. These mainly consist of an account of their experiences, including recountings of inquisitions, visions/prophecies, treatment, and illnesses. They include letters to friends, family, and church members that discuss religion and faith in depth. While recounting the narrative, both Evans and Cheevers use language and a writing style that historians attribute to the women's desire to draw biblical comparisons and paint themselves as victims or martyrs. They included extended discussions of their ideals, involving a core belief in salvation through personal belief in God, and accounts of "revelations and visions", one of which is a world-ending war against Catholicism. These works were received well in England by early Quaker audiences and printed in several editions, with few editorial changes.

The veracity and accuracy of the books written by Evans and Cheevers have been questioned, with some historians finding discrepancies between the women's account and the court records and documents.

== Release and later life ==
Evans and Cheevers were released in 1662, after repeated attempts to convert them to Catholicism had failed. Both the priests responsible for them and the new consul grew weary of their behaviour while imprisoned, coinciding with continued petitions from George Fox and Gilbert Lately. On their journey home, Evans and Cheevers continued proselytizing and advertising their faith. Though they were not met with open hostility, their journey back to England was hastened by the English authorities.

Not much is known of the subsequent lives of Evans and Cheevers. Some Christian organizations, however, hold the works of Evans and Cheevers as examples of true religious dedication. Some also credit them with shedding valuable light on early Quaker theology and the evolution of church doctrine.

== List of works ==
- Evans, Katherine and Sarah Cheevers, A True Account of the Great Tryals and Cruel Sufferings Undergone by Those Two Faithful Servants of God, Katherine Evans and Sarah Cheevers, in the Time of Their above Three Years and a Halfs Confinement in the Island Malta, London: 1663.
- Evans, Katharine and Sarah Cheevers, This is a Short Relation of some of the Cruel Sufferings (for the Truths Sake) of Katharine Evans & Sarah Cheevers in the Inquisition in the Isle of Malta. London, 1662
- Evans, Katherine, Sarah Cheevers, and George Robinson. A brief history of the voyage of Katharine Evans and Sarah Cheevers, to the island of Malta ... To which is added, a short relation from George Robinson, of the sufferings which befel him in his journey to Jerusalem. London: Printed by the assigns of J. Sowle, in White-Hart-Court in Gracious-Street, and at the Bible in George-Yard, Lombard-Street, 1715.
