= Camerton Court =

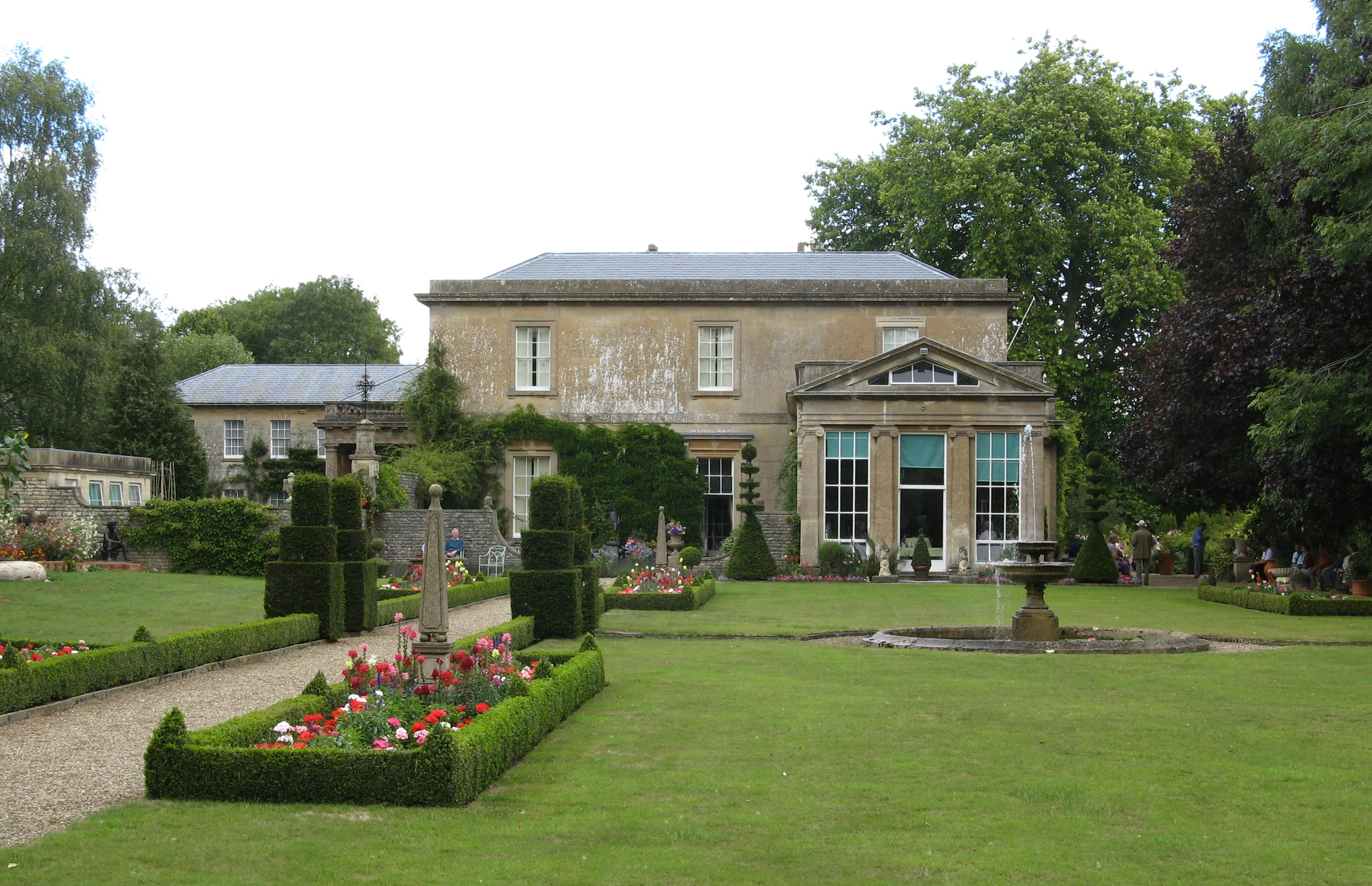
- Camerton Court from the lawn

- Location within Somerset
- 51°19′02″N 2°26′59″W
- Location: Camerton, Somerset, England

History
- Built: 1840

Site notes
- Architect: George Repton

Listed Building – Grade II
- Official name: Camerton Court
- Designated: 1 February 1956
- Reference no.: 1365682

Camerton Court is a historic house in the village of Camerton, Somerset, England. It has been designated as a Grade II listed building.

== House ==
The country house was built in 1835, designed by George Repton. It is constructed from ashlar, with a slate and concrete tiled roof. The building is two storeys with a porte-cochère with Tuscan columns at the front. From the garden the building has an octastyle colonnade with Ionic order columns, with a conservatory to the left. The remains of the previous house were turned into a stable block, but have since become a separate home.

The 8.1 hectares (20 acres) gardens were laid out in 1835 but was extensively remodelled in the 1980s. the majority of the estate is parkland but there is a kitchen garden on the approach to the house, as well a small orchard. There are also a number of greenhouses on the site. The formal gardens include ornamental structures, a canal, gazebos and a pond with fountain.

== History ==
There has been a manor at Camerton since the reign of Alfred the Great, who granted the manor to the monks of Glastonbury. After the Norman conquest of England, William the Conqueror granted the manor to the Earl of Morton, who traded back to the monks of Glastonbury. The monks largely held the manor until 14th century, when it was passed between the Dinham and Paulton families. The Carew family held the manor between the 15th century and 18th century.

The present house was built by John Jarrett circa 1835, to a design by George S Repton (son of Humphry Repton), replacing an earlier Manor House. Violin maker Henry Lye worked as a carpenter at the estate for fifty six years.
