= Church of St Mary, Nempnett Thrubwell =

Church in Somerset, England

Church of St Mary
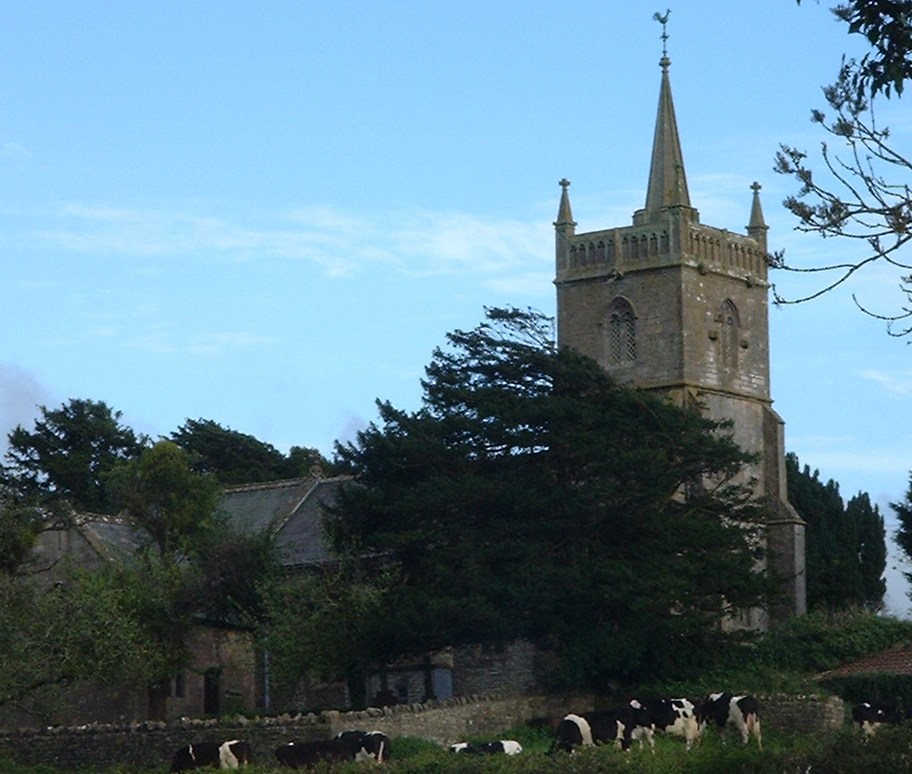

- Location within Somerset
- 51°20′27″N 2°40′20″W
- Location: Nempnett Thrubwell, Somerset, England

Site notes
- Elevation: 140m above sea level

Listed Building – Grade II*
- Designated: 21 September 1960
- Reference no.: 1136164

The Anglican Church of St Mary stands on Knap Hill in Nempnett Thrubwell, Somerset, England dates from the 15th century, but was built on the site of an earlier Norman church. It is a Grade II* listed building.

Before the dissolution of the monasteries the parish belonged to Flaxley Abbey in Gloucestershire. In 1537 the land and manor were granted to Sir William Kingston. The parish register lists christenings, marriages and burials from 1568.

The three stage tower, which contains five bells, has set back buttresses and two arch bell openings with tracery. The tower is crowned by a parapet with blank arcading, and square pinnacles, it also has a slightly higher stair turret. The nave was restored at a cost of £700 in 1864. The late Victorian chancel of 1897 is in the decorated style. Inside the church is a screen attributed to Pugin, although Nikolaus Pevsner is of the opinion the architect is probably Pugin the younger.

The base of a 15th-century cross in the churchyard is listed Grade II.

Wade and Wade in their 1929 book "Somerset" described it as "a small building with a Perp. W. tower, from the W. face of which project two curious and uncanny carved heads of a man and beast. The walls of the nave still bear the original 13th cent. consecration crosses. The chancel is modern, and contains a rich modern screen and a good E. window of Munich glass. Note (1) rude Norm. S. doorway filled with Perp. tracery; (2) Norm. font carved with a curious device by some later craftsman. Near the porch in the churchyard is (1) base of ancient cross; (2) tomb of first rector — Robert — bearing an incised cross".

== See also ==
- List of ecclesiastical parishes in the Diocese of Bath and Wells
