= Inglesbatch =

Coordinates: 51.350371°N 2.426922°W

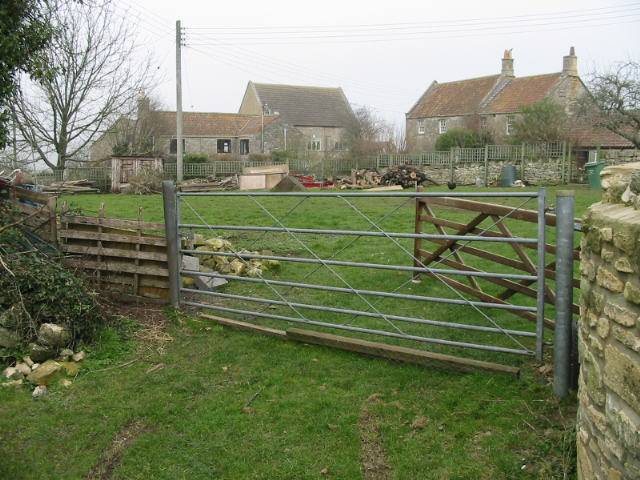
- Inglesbatch from Stitchings Lane

- Location within Somerset
- OS grid reference: ST7036561341
- Civil parish: Englishcombe
- Unitary authority: Bath and North East Somerset
- Ceremonial county: Somerset
- Region: South West
- Country: England
- Sovereign state: United Kingdom
- Post town: BATH
- Postcode district: BA2
- Police: Avon and Somerset
- Fire: Avon
- Ambulance: South Western
- UK Parliament: Frome and East Somerset

Inglesbatch is a small hamlet within the civil parish of Englishcombe in the Bath and North East Somerset district of Somerset, England. Its nearest town is Bath, which lies approximately 3.7 miles (6.0 km) north-east from the hamlet. Inglesbatch Farm has an acreage of over 1,000 acres (400 ha).

== History ==
Inglesbatch, like the neighbouring Englishcombe, probably derives its name from the Anglo-Saxon personal name "Ingwald", as in Ingwald's batch, with batch possibly denoting a hillock or stream or valley.

The earliest record of a settlement at Inglesbatch was recorded in 1290. In 1530 there is reference to the village having its own manor, but by 1611 it appears to have been subsumed into the lands of Englishcombe Manor.

== Buildings ==
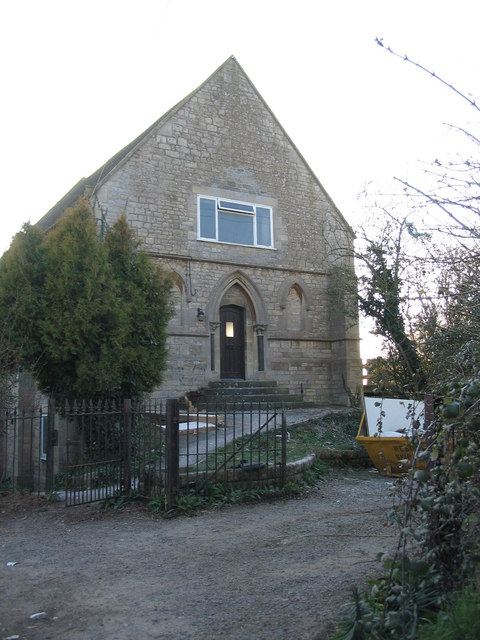
The converted chapel

Allandale is a detached house built in the early 19th century. Home Farmhouse is slightly later having been built in the mid 19th century. Both are Grade II listed buildings.

A Baptist chapel was built in the village in 1813, and has now been converted into a private dwelling.

== Climate ==
Being 4 miles (6.4 km) south-west of Bath the climate of Inglesbatch does not differ greatly to the climate of Bath.

== Notable residents ==
Katherine Evans, a famous Quaker who was imprisoned in Malta in 1658 under the Spanish Inquisition was from Inglesbatch.

Bill Bailey, a British surfer known as "the father of British surfing" grew up in the village.
