= Plaster's Green Meadows =

Protected area in Somerset, England

- Site of Special Scientific Interest
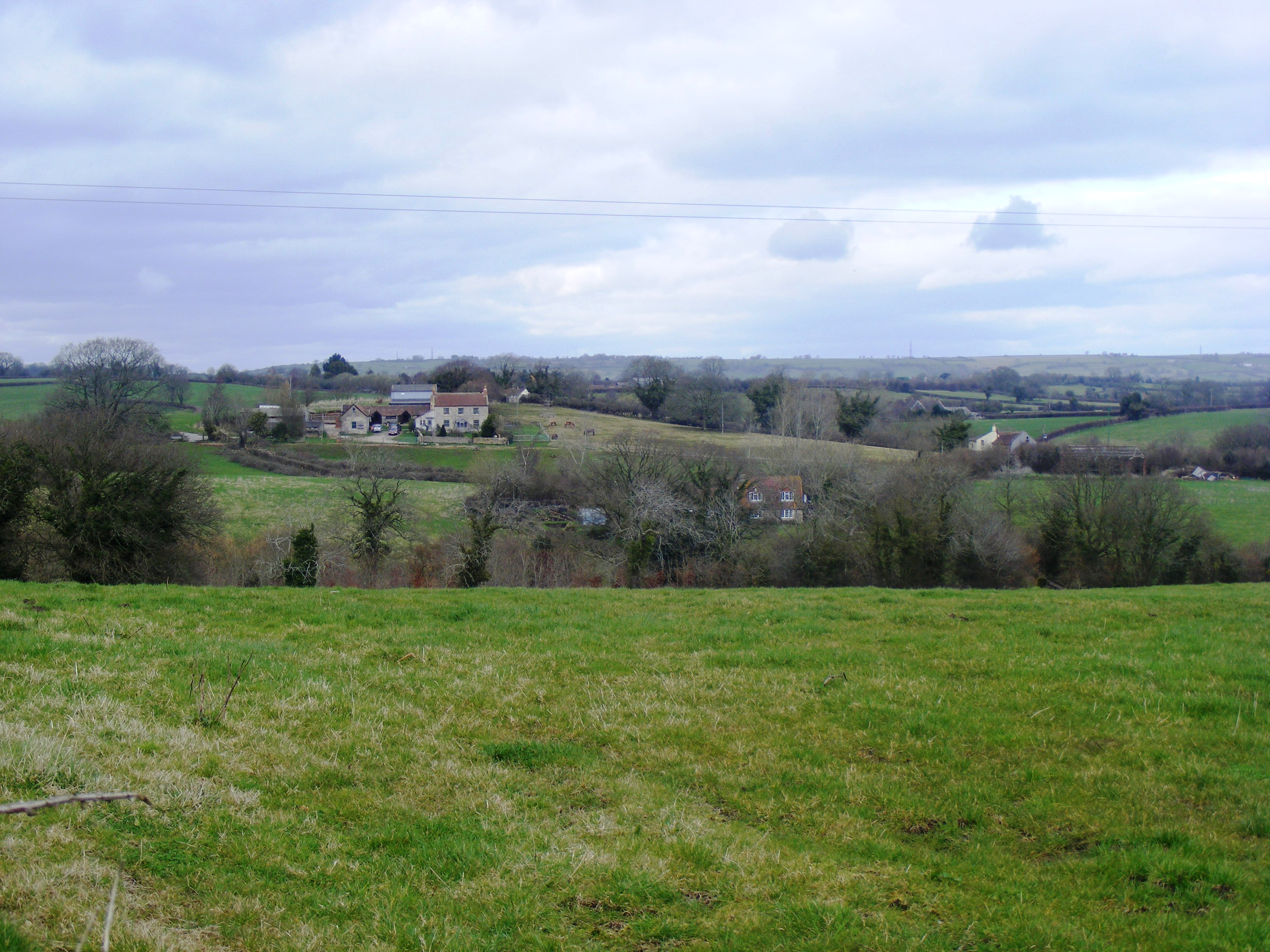

- Location within Somerset
- Location of Plaster's Green Meadows.
- Area of search: Avon
- Grid reference: ST532611
- Coordinates: 51.34704°N 2.67335°W
- Interest: Biological
- Area: 4.3 hectares (0.043 km^{2}; 0.017 sq mi)
- Notification date: 1989

Plaster's Green Meadows (grid reference ST532611) is a 4.3 hectare biological Site of Special Scientific Interest near the village of Nempnett Thrubwell, Bath and North East Somerset, notified in 1989.

This is an area of unimproved and traditionally managed species-rich meadows which support a neutral grassland community of a type which is now rare throughout Britain. The site is situated on the slopes fringing the Lias Tablelands and is underlain by Rhaetic clays and, lower down the slope Keuper Red Marl. The slowly permeable clay soils are slightly calcareous in nature and this is reflected in elements of the flora.

The site is characterised by the nationally rare Common Knapweed (Centaurea nigra) and Crested Dog’s-tail (Cynosurus cristatus) and dominant grasses include Sweet Vernal-grass (Anthoxanthum odoratum), Crested Dog’s-tail and Yorkshire Fog (Holcus lanatus), while Quaking Grass (Briza media) and Yellow Oat-grass (Trisetum flavescens) are also frequent.

There is a high component of herb species throughout the meadows including Saw-wort (Serratuta tinctoria), Dyer’s Greenweed (Genista tinctoria), Common Knapweed, Pepper-saxifrage (Silaum silaus), Devil’s-bit Scabious (Succisa pratensis), Betony (Stachys officinalis) and Spiny Restharrow (Ononis spinosa). The calcareous nature of the soil is reflected by the presence of Cowslip (Primula veris), Fairy Flax (Linum catharticum), Glaucous Sedge (Carex flacca), Lady’s Bedstraw (Galium verum) and occasional Salad Burnet (Sanguisorba minor).

The meadows are bounded by hedges supporting numerous species including Hawthorn (Crataegus monogyna), Wych Elm (Ulmus glabra), English Elm (Ulmus procera), Hazel (Corylus avellana) and Field Maple (Acer campestre). Hedgerow trees include Ash (Fraxinus excelsior), Sweet Chestnut (Castanea sativa), Holly (Ilex aquifolium) and Oak (Quercus spp.).

== Sources ==
- English Nature citation sheet for the site (accessed 16 July 2006)
