= Englishcombe =

Village in Somerset, England

Coordinates: 51.3631°N 2.4071°W

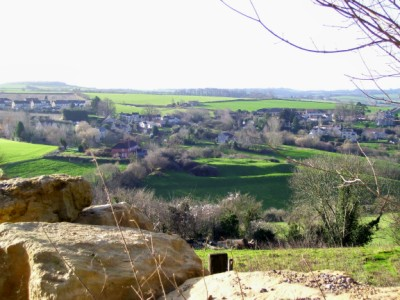
- View of Englishcombe

- Location within Somerset
- Population: 318
- OS grid reference: ST717627
- Unitary authority: Bath and North East Somerset
- Ceremonial county: Somerset
- Region: South West
- Country: England
- Sovereign state: United Kingdom
- Post town: Bath
- Postcode district: BA2
- Police: Avon and Somerset
- Fire: Avon
- Ambulance: South Western
- UK Parliament: Frome and East Somerset

Englishcombe is a village and civil parish in Bath and North East Somerset just south-west of Bath, England. The parish, which also includes the hamlets of Inglesbatch and Nailwell, had a population of 318 at the 2011 census.

== History ==
A Neolithic axe has been found in the parish, and Iron Age pottery was discovered during the construction of Culverhay School. There is some evidence of two barrows.

The southeastern boundary of the parish follows the route of the Fosse Way a Roman road that linked Exeter (Isca Dumnoniorum) in South West England to Lincoln (Lindum Colonia) in the East Midlands, via Ilchester (Lindinis), Bath (Aquae Sulis), Cirencester (Corinium) and Leicester (Ratae Corieltauvorum).

The village lies on the route of the Wansdyke (from Woden's Dyke) an early medieval or Roman series of defensive linear earthworks, consisting of a ditch and a running embankment from the ditch spoil, with the ditching facing north. Its construction is attributed to the Saxons, probably in the late sixth century. The parish of Englishcombe was part of the Wellow Hundred.

The Domesday Book of 1086 records that Englishcombe was held by Nigel de Gournay, who would have won his lands in Englishcombe, Twerton, Swainswick and Barrow Gurney by fighting for William I of England. His original home may have been Gournay, which was halfway between Dieppe and Paris.

Thomas de Gournay was involved with the murder of Edward II at Berkeley Castle in 1327. The earthwork remains of the Gournay family castle, just north of the village of Englishcombe, are known as Culverhay Castle, built in the 12th century and now a Scheduled Ancient Monument.

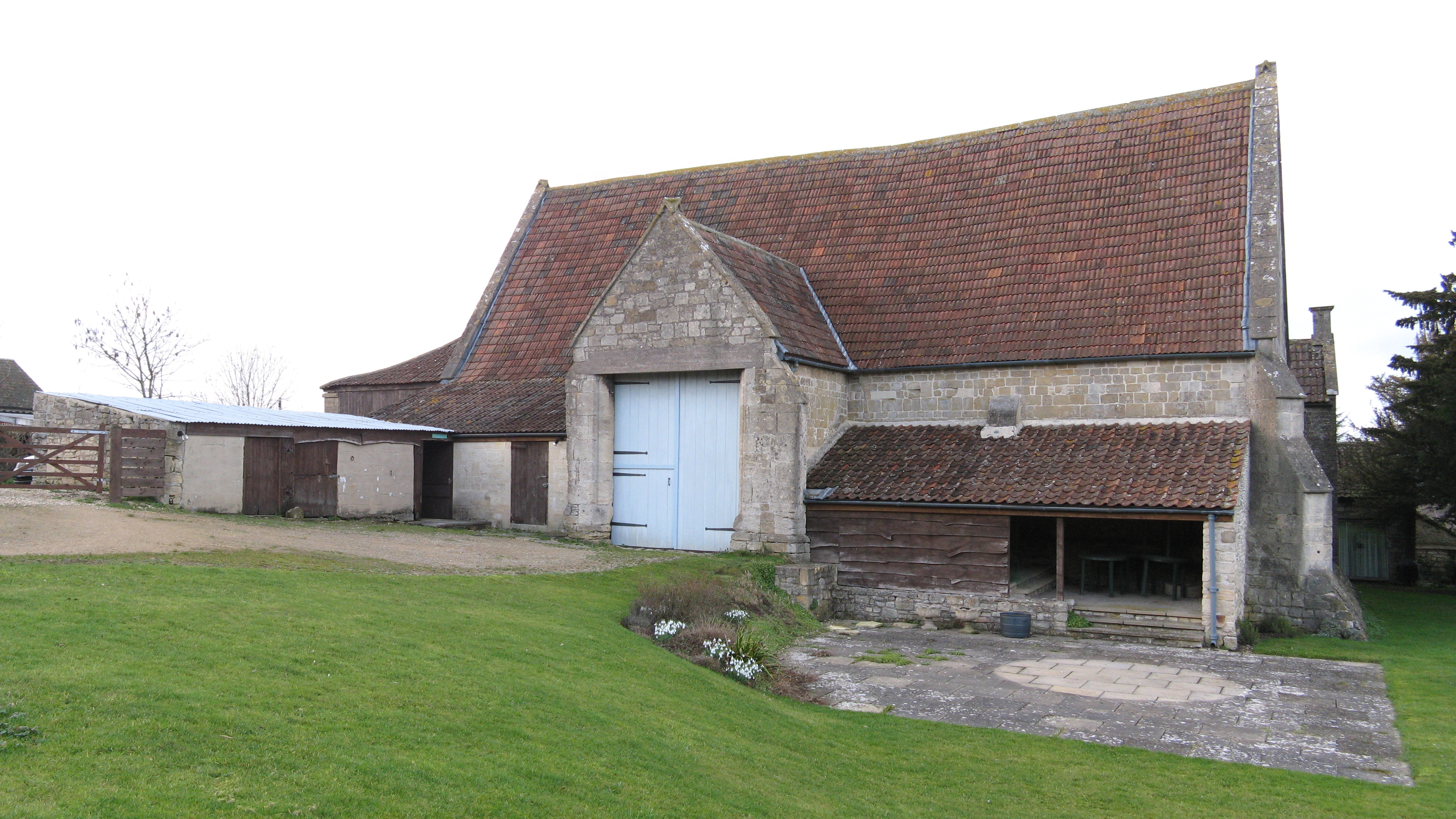
Tithe Barn

The tithe barn attached to Rectory Farmhouse was built by Bath Abbey in the early 14th century. It was restored in the 1990s and has been designated as a Grade II* listed building. Rectory Farmhouse itself was built onto the barn in the early to mid 17th century.

The Manor of Inglescombe, as it was previously called, was acquired by the Duchy of Cornwall in 1421. Along with the Duchy's more recent acquisition of the neighbouring village of Newton St Loe in 1941, they form the Duchy's largest estate outside Dartmoor.

The mining of Fuller's earth started in the parish in the 19th century but expanded around the time of World War I with pits in Middle Wood and Vernham Wood. It continued until the 1960s when small underground springs made the extraction too expensive to continue.

== Governance ==
The parish council has responsibility for local issues, including setting an annual precept (local rate) to cover the council's operating costs and producing annual accounts for public scrutiny. The parish council evaluates local planning applications and works with the local police, district council officers, and neighbourhood watch groups on matters of crime, security, and traffic. The parish council's role also includes initiating projects for the maintenance and repair of parish facilities, such as the village hall or community centre, playing fields and playgrounds, as well as consulting with the district council on the maintenance, repair, and improvement of highways, drainage, footpaths, public transport, and street cleaning. Conservation matters (including trees and listed buildings) and environmental issues are also of interest to the council.

The parish falls within the unitary authority of Bath and North East Somerset, which was created in 1996, as established by the Local Government Act 1992. Between 1 April 1974 and 1 April 1996, it was the Wansdyke district and the City of Bath of the county of Avon. Before 1974 that the parish was part of the Bathavon Rural District.

The parish is represented in the House of Commons of the Parliament of the United Kingdom as part of Frome and East Somerset, which elects one Member of Parliament (MP) by the first past the post system of election. It was also part of the South West England constituency of the European Parliament prior to Britain leaving the European Union in January 2020, which elected seven MEPs using the d'Hondt method of party-list proportional representation.

== St Peter's Church ==
The Church of St Peter, was probably built by Robert de Gournay in the 12th century. The church features Norman arches, and leper holes in the porch, which would have enabled lepers to hear the sermon without coming into contact with the rest of the congregation. It has been designated as a Grade I listed building.

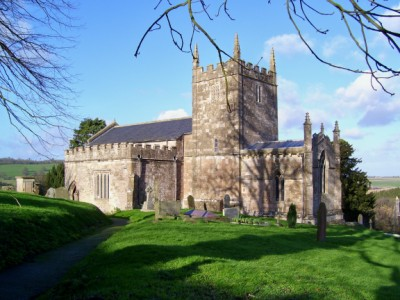
Church of St Peter, Englishcombe

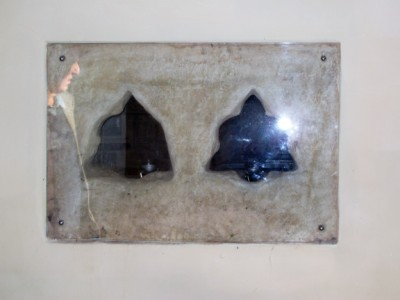
Leper holes
