= Nempnett Thrubwell =

Village in Somerset, England

Coordinates: 51.3379°N 2.6798°W

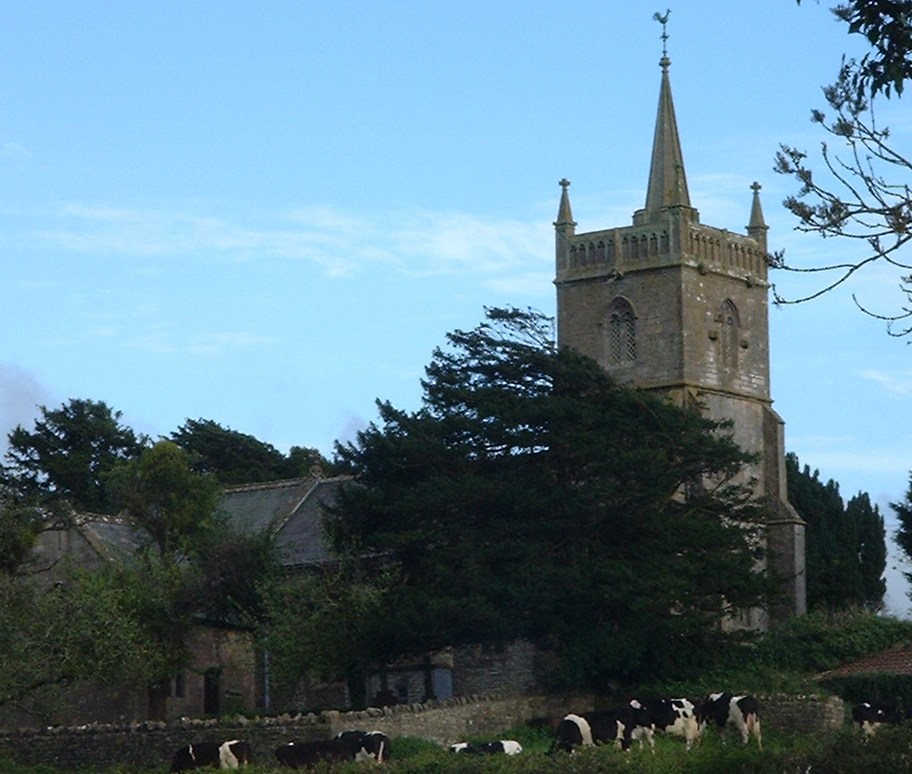
- St Mary's church

- Location within Somerset
- Population: 177 (2011)
- OS grid reference: ST526601
- Unitary authority: Bath and North East Somerset
- Ceremonial county: Somerset
- Region: South West
- Country: England
- Sovereign state: United Kingdom
- Post town: BRISTOL
- Postcode district: BS40
- Dialling code: 01275
- Police: Avon and Somerset
- Fire: Avon
- Ambulance: South Western
- UK Parliament: North East Somerset and Hanham

Nempnett Thrubwell is a small village and civil parish in dairying country on the western edge of Bath and North East Somerset, in the county of Somerset, England. It is about 15 km south-west of Bristol. The parish, which has a population of 177, is sheltered by the Mendip Hills, near the River Yeo in the Chew Valley. It is the site of the Fairy Toot oval barrow.

Lying just to the north of Blagdon Lake, isolated Nempnett Thrubwell falls within the network of minor roads bounded by the A38, A368, B3114 and B3130; whilst signposted from each of these major routes, a lack of any further signposting makes it difficult to locate the village when arriving by road. The landscape is characterized by isolated farmsteads, the vernacular older buildings generally of the local Lias limestone or of render with clay-tiled roofs.

Though being largely rural Nempnett Thrubwell's comedic name makes the village something of a local attraction. It is the subject of the song Down In Nempnett Thrubwell by The Wurzels and is mentioned in the earlier Adge Cutler song Up The Clump.

== History ==
Nempnett and Thrubwell were originally separate places. The name Nempnett comes from the Old English word emnet, meaning "level ground" (the initial N was carried over from the definite article, an example of misdivision). Thrubwell's name is of uncertain origin, but may mean "gushing stream".

The parish of Nempnett Thrubwell was part of the Keynsham Hundred.

=== Civil War ===
The village played a minor role in the English Civil War 1640–1660, just prior to the taking of Bristol by Fairfax's forces. The village lies on the direct route between Bristol and Sherborne, where Fairfax's forces had rested after The Battle of Langport in July 1645. Cromwell's cavalry is known to have stabled in the hamlet on the nights of 8–9 September 1645 just before Fairfax’s final assault on Bristol on 10 September in which they played a critical role.

== Governance ==
The parish council has responsibility for local issues, including setting an annual precept (local rate) to cover the council’s operating costs and producing annual accounts for public scrutiny. The parish council evaluates local planning applications and works with the local police, district council officers, and neighbourhood watch groups on matters of crime, security, and traffic. The parish council's role also includes initiating projects for the maintenance and repair of parish facilities, such as the village hall or community centre, playing fields and playgrounds, as well as consulting with the district council on the maintenance, repair, and improvement of highways, drainage, footpaths, public transport, and street cleaning. Conservation matters (including trees and listed buildings) and environmental issues are also of interest to the council.

Nempnett Thrubwell is part of the Chew Valley South Ward which is represented by one councillor on the unitary authority of Bath and North East Somerset which was created in 1996, as established by the Local Government Act 1992. It provides a single tier of local government with responsibility for almost all local government functions within its area including local planning and building control, local roads, council housing, environmental health, markets and fairs, refuse collection, recycling, cemeteries, crematoria, leisure services, parks, and tourism. It is also responsible for education, social services, libraries, main roads, public transport, trading standards, waste disposal and strategic planning, although fire, police and ambulance services are provided jointly with other authorities through the Avon Fire and Rescue Service, Avon and Somerset Constabulary and the Great Western Ambulance Service.

Bath and North East Somerset's area covers part of the ceremonial county of Somerset but it is administered independently of the non-metropolitan county. Its administrative headquarters is in Bath. Between 1 April 1974 and 1 April 1996, it was the Wansdyke district and the City of Bath of the county of Avon. Before 1974 that the parish was part of the Clutton Rural District.

The parish is represented in the House of Commons of the Parliament of the United Kingdom as part of North East Somerset and Hanham. It elects one Member of Parliament (MP) by the first past the post system of election.

== Geography ==
The nearby meadows at Plaster's Green Meadows are designated as a Site of Special Scientific Interest because it is an area of unimproved and traditionally managed species-rich meadows which support a neutral grassland community of a type which is now rare throughout Britain. The site is situated on the slopes fringing the Lias Tablelands and is underlain by Rhaetic clays and, lower down the slope Keuper Red Marl. The slowly permeable clay soils are slightly calcareous in nature and this is reflected in elements of the flora.

The site is characterised by the nationally rare Common Knapweed (Centaurea nigra) and Crested Dog’s-tail (Cynosurus cristatus) and dominant grasses include Sweet Vernal-grass (Anthoxanthum odoratum), Crested Dog’s-tail and Yorkshire Fog (Holcus lanatus), while Quaking Grass (Briza media) and Yellow Oat-grass (Trisetum flavescens) are also frequent. There is a high component of herb species throughout the meadows including Saw-wort (Serratuta tinctoria), Dyer’s Greenweed (Genista tinctoria), Common Knapweed, Pepper-saxifrage (Silaum silaus), Devil’s-bit Scabious (Succisa pratensis), Betony (Stachys officinalis) and Spiny Restharrow (Ononis spinosa). The calcareous nature of the soil is reflected by the presence of Cowslip (Primula veris), Fairy Flax (Linum catharticum), Glaucous Sedge (Carex flacca), Lady’s Bedstraw (Galium verum) and occasional Salad Burnet (Sanguisorba minor). The meadows are bounded by hedges supporting numerous species including Hawthorn (Crataegus monogyna), Wych Elm (Ulmus glabra), English elm (Ulmus procera), Hazel (Corylus avellana) and Field Maple (Acer campestre). Hedgerow trees include Ash (Fraxinus excelsior), Sweet Chestnut (Castanea sativa), Holly (Ilex aquifolium) and Oak (Quercus sp).

== Demographics ==
According to the 2001 Census, the Chew Valley South Ward (which includes Ubley), had 1,032 residents, living in 411 households, with an average age of 42.1 years. Of these 74% of residents describing their health as 'good', 20% of 16- to 74-year-olds had no qualifications; and the area had an unemployment rate of 1.7% of all economically active people aged 16–74. In the Index of Multiple Deprivation 2004, it was ranked at 22,950 out of 32,482 wards in England, where 1 was the most deprived LSOA and 32,482 the least deprived.

== Landmarks ==
=== The Fairy Toot ===
In the parish, the Fairy Toot is an extensive oval barrow, formerly a chambered cairn which is a Scheduled Ancient Monument. The Fairy Toot south-southwest of Howgrove Farm is a mound 60 m long, 25 m wide and now 2.5 m high, retained by a stone wall. Its summit is covered with ash trees and shrubs. Formerly it was considerably higher. On being opened in 1789 and essentially destroyed, it was found to contain two rows of cells, running from south to north, formed by immense stones set edgeways, and covered by others of larger dimensions. At the time it was conjectured to be a work of the Druids, but its origins are far older and probably date from the Neolithic period.

Wade and Wade in their 1929 book "Somerset" described it as "a remarkably fine tumulus of masonry, said to have been one of the finest in Britain, in the chambers of which skeletons have been discovered. A few vestiges of it now only remain, the rest has been used as a lime-kiln."

=== Parish church ===
The parish church, St Mary's on Knap Hill, has a tower containing six bells. The tower has set back buttresses and two arch bell openings with tracery. The tower is crowned by a parapet with blank arcading, and square pinnacles, it also has a slightly higher stair turret. The late Victorian chancel of 1897 is in the decorated style. Inside the church is a screen attributed to Pugin, although Nikolaus Pevsner is of the opinion the architect is probably Pugin the younger. It is a Grade II* listed building, with a cross in the churchyard being listed Grade II.

Wade and Wade in their 1929 book "Somerset" described it as "a small building with a Perp. W. tower, from the W. face of which project two curious and uncanny carved heads of a man and beast. The walls of the nave still bear the original 13th cent. consecration crosses. The chancel is modern, and contains a rich modern screen and a good E. window of Munich glass. Note (1) rude Norm. S. doorway filled with Perp. tracery; (2) Norm. font carved with a curious device by some later craftsman. Near the porch in the churchyard is (1) base of ancient cross; (2) tomb of first rector — Robert — bearing an incised cross".

The parish register lists christenings, marriages and burials from 1568. The lords of the manor and chief landowners, following the demise of the Babers during the 17th century, have been the baronets Tynte of Halswell. The Tyntes are probably responsible for the obelisk located at Rookery Farm in the parish.

=== Other ===
Regilbury Park Farm, in the parish, has a farmhouse which was formerly the ancestral home of the Baber family, one time lords of the manor. Parts of the mansion remain, with mullioned windows in one large gabled wing. It is a Grade II listed building.

The Old Rectory, which is now a private house, dates from 1860. A 19th-century black cast iron pump, with a lion crest, curved handle and fluted finial and its retaining walls, about 10 metres north-west of Mendip Farmhouse, which is marked as a spring on Ordnance Survey maps, is Grade II listed.

The Victorian village hall fell into disrepair during the second half of the 20th century. It was restored over a period of years and reopened on 15 July 2006.

== Popular culture ==
Nempnett Thrubwell is the subject of the song Down In Nempnett Thrubwell by The Wurzels.

Anna's Story: Basset Mead by Alfred Fox, published in 2008, is set in the village.

The village is the birthplace of Edith Chapman née Towers, the mother of the late Graham Chapman, actor, comedian and member of the surrealist comedy group Monty Python. Despite being born in the village, Edith only lived there for a short time before her family moved to Leicestershire where she grew up and eventually met Walter Chapman, Graham's father.

Nempnett Thrubwell is also the birthplace of the theatre and film director Phyllida Lloyd.
