= Culverhay Castle =

Castle in Somerset, England

- Englishcombe, Somerset
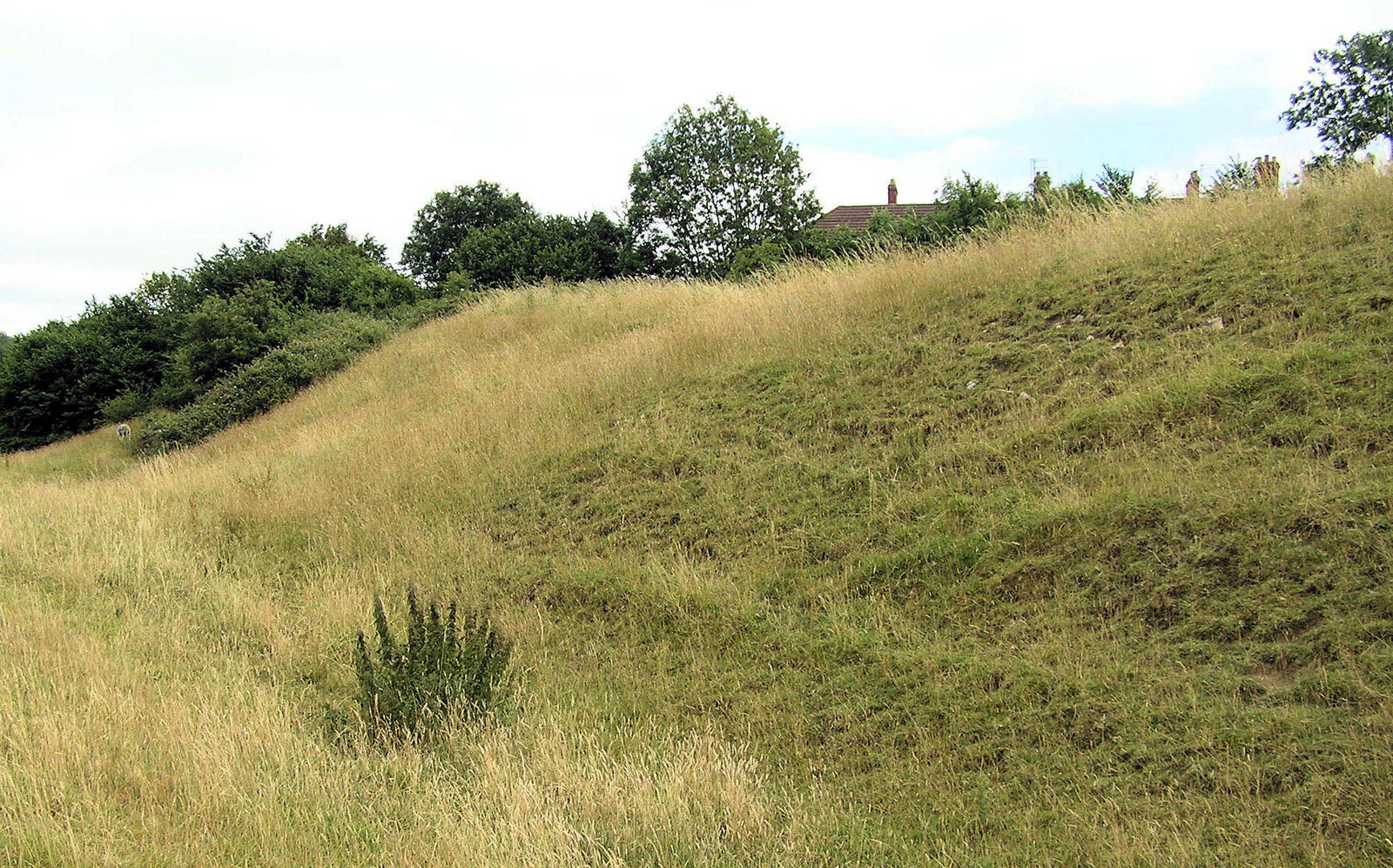
- Earthworks of Culverhay Castle

Site information
- Type: Ringwork

Location
- Shown within Somerset and the British Isles
- Coordinates: 51.3663°N 2.4050°W
- Grid reference: grid reference ST719631

Culverhay Castle, also known as Englishcombe Castle, was a castle in the village of Englishcombe, Somerset, England.

== Details ==
Culverhay Castle was built in a ringwork design in the village of Englishcombe, Somerset. The ringwork ditch and bank, up to 5 feet (1.5 m) deep, is to the east of the village church. During the first half of the 13th century a stone circular keep and low curtain wall was built at the castle, along with one or two other stone buildings within the ringwork. A medieval deer park may have been attached to the castle.

Estimates of the date of the original building range from the late 11th century to the early 13th century.

The castle site was excavated by archaeologist Nigel Pounds in 1938, and today is a scheduled monument.

== See also ==
- Castles in Great Britain and Ireland
- List of castles in England
