= Richmont Castle =

- East Harptree, Somerset
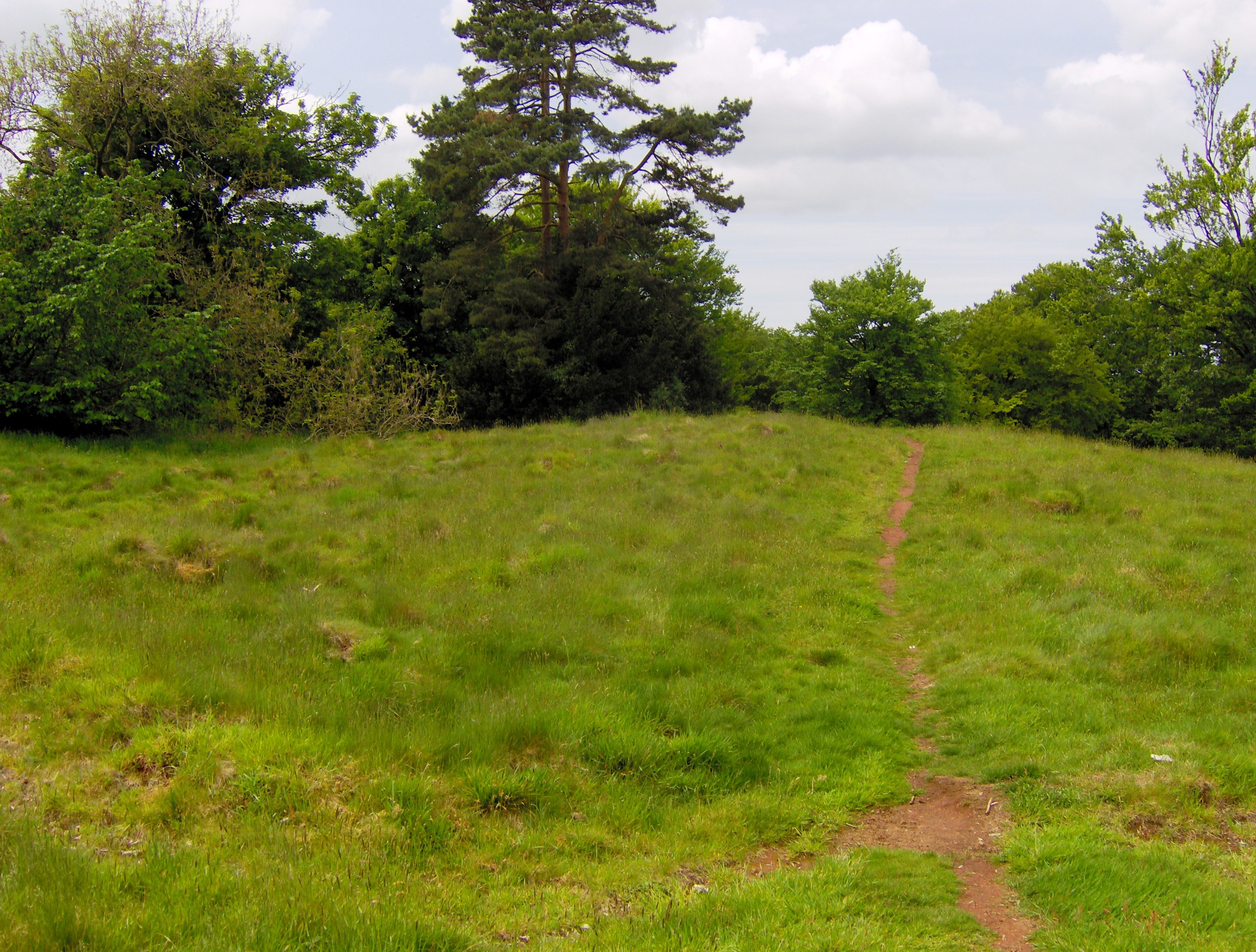
- Site of Richmont Castle

Site information
- Type: Keep and bailey
- Owner: Private
- Condition: Earthworks and limited masonry remain

Location
- Shown within Somerset and the British Isles
- Coordinates: 51.2996°N 2.6296°W
- Grid reference: grid reference ST562558

Richmont Castle was an 11th-century motte-and-bailey castle near the village of East Harptree, Somerset, England. Now totally ruined, it once included parkland, an artificial lake and served as the local minery court.

== Location ==
Richmont Castle was built near the village of East Harptree, Somerset, probably soon after the Norman Conquest of England in 1066. The name probably means either "rich mountain" or "strong mountain". The castle was located on a steep spur of ground, overlooking the Chew Valley, with two valleys, called coombes, dropping away on either side of the spur.

== History ==
The first version of the castle appears to have been constructed using a single bailey on the south side, possibly making use of an existing Iron Age fortification, similar to that at nearby Bincknoll. Later versions of the castle involved the creation of an inner bailey within the first, and a circular keep on the highest point on the spur. The castle became part of a managed landscape and was surrounded by a park called the Great Park; the keep may have overlooked an artificial lake across the valley floor to the west.

The castle may have been founded by William FitzJohn de Harptree.

During the 12th century, Richmont Castle was involved in the civil war known as the Anarchy, during which King Stephen and the Empress Matilda attempted to establish control of England. The castle was controlled by Sir William de Harptree, who supported Matilda. In 1138, after failing to take Bristol, Stephen advanced on Richmont and, according to chroniclers, took the castle through subterfuge. Stephen set up his siege engines at a distance from the castle and then, when the garrison attempted to take advantage of this by coming out to attack him, quickly attacked and burnt the main gates behind them, successfully taking the castle. The castle was also visited by King John in 1205. The castle was used by the de Harptrees and de Gurney families for most of the rest of the medieval period, forming the administrative centre and law court for one of the four Mendip mineries in the region.

== Abandonment ==
The castle was ruined and abandoned by the 1540s, with the stone being reused to build local houses. The Newton family excavated the foundations to build a house nearby called "Eastwood", according to John Leland.

The site was mined extensively between the 17th and 19th centuries for lead and calamine, used at the foundries at Bristol. Today the site is a scheduled monument, and a small fragment of the keep can still be seen on the site.

== See also ==
- Castles in Great Britain and Ireland
- List of castles in England

== Bibliography ==
- Brown, G. (2008) Richmont Castle, East Harptree: An Analytical Earthwork Survey, English Heritage Research Department Report No. 73. London: English Heritage.
- Dunning, Robert. (1982) A History of Somerset. Chichester, UK: Phillimore & Co. ISBN 0-85033-461-6.
- Dunning, Robert. (1995) Somerset Castles. Tiverton, UK: Somerset Books. ISBN 0-86183-278-7.
- Gough, J. W. (1931) "Mendip Mining Law and Forest Bounds," Somerset Record Society 45.
- Mackenzie, J.D. (1896) Castles of England. New York: Macmillan.
