= Stoney Littleton Long Barrow =

Neolithic chambered tomb in England

- Bath Tumulus; Wellow Tumulus
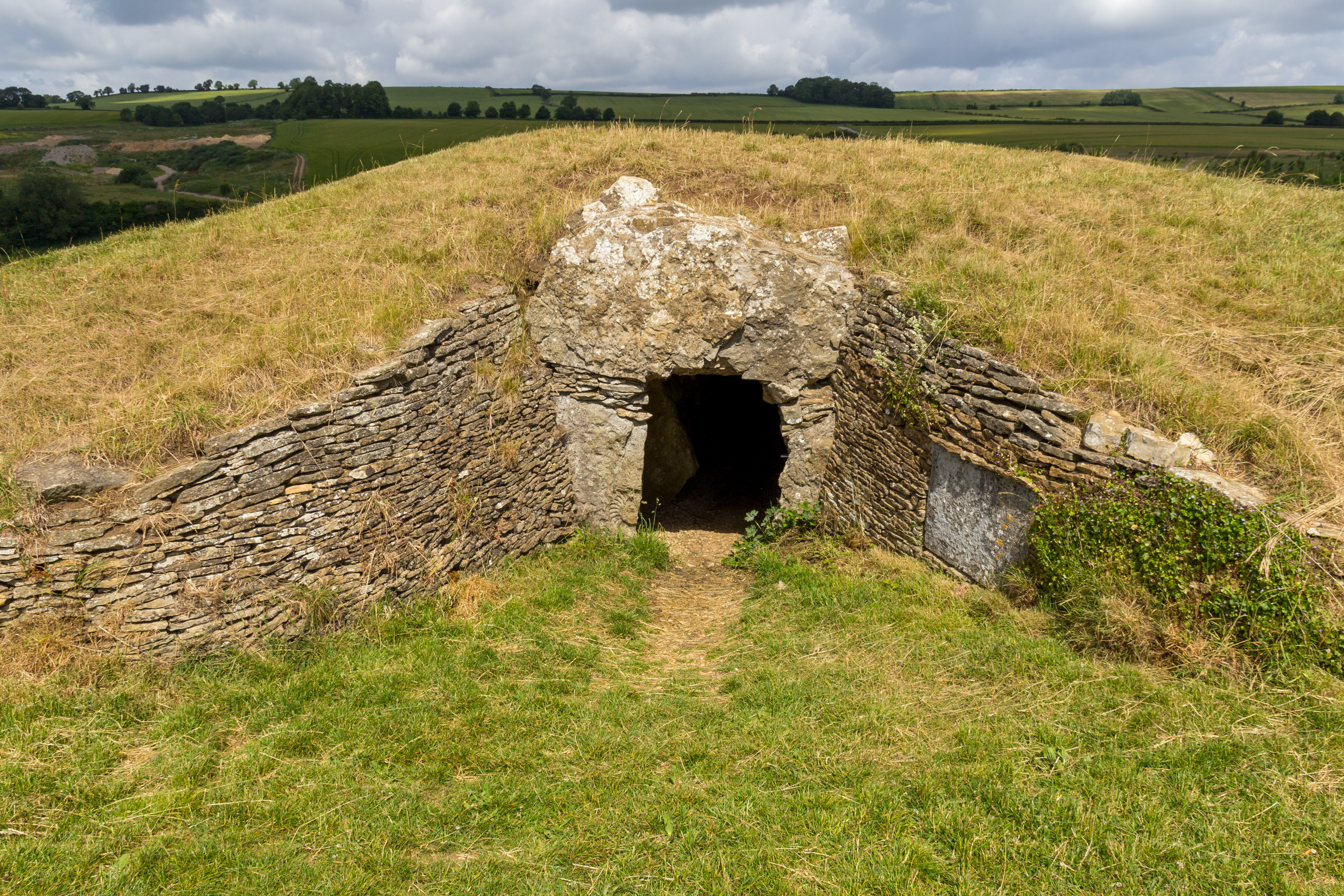
- Stoney Littleton Long Barrow entrance, 2015

- Location within Somerset
- 51°18′48″N 2°22′54″W
- Type: Chambered long barrow
- Periods: Neolithic
- Location: near Wellow
- Region: Somerset, England

History
- Built: c. 3500 BC

Site notes
- Height: c. 3 meters
- Condition: intact
- Public access: yes

The Stoney Littleton Long Barrow (also known as the Bath Tumulus and the Wellow Tumulus) is a Neolithic chambered tomb with multiple burial chambers, located near the village of Wellow in the English county of Somerset. It is an example of the Cotswold-Severn Group and was scheduled as an ancient monument in 1882. It was one of the initial monuments included when the Ancient Monuments Protection Act 1882 became law.

The chambered long barrow was built around 3500 BC. Excavations in the early 19th century uncovered bones from several individuals. The stone structure is about 30 metres (98 ft) in length and contains a 12.8-metre (42 ft) long gallery with three pairs of side chambers and an end chamber.

== Location and access ==
The barrow is approximately 1.5 kilometres (0.9 mi) south west of the village of Wellow. It is on a limestone ridge overlooking Wellow Brook approximately 200 metres (660 ft) to the north and west of the barrow. It is surrounded by a rectangular grass area accessed via a stile and footpath from a car park at Stoney Littleton Farm.

== History ==
Chambered long barrows were constructed during the Neolithic between 4000 and 2500 BC for the ritual inhumation of the dead. Stoney Littleton Long Barrow was probably constructed around 3500 BC.

The tomb was first opened around 1760 by a local farmer to obtain stone for road building. The site was excavated by John Skinner and Richard Hoare in 1816–17, along with a labourer Zebedee Weston, who gained the entry through the hole which was made previously. The excavation revealed the bones (some burned) of several individuals. The mound was restored in 1858 by Thomas Joliffe. Some of the artefacts from the excavations are in the Bristol Museum & Art Gallery.

It was scheduled as an ancient monument in 1882. Since 1884, the Stoney Littleton Long Barrow has been in state care, and is now managed by English Heritage who have provided an information board at the site. Further conservation work and a geophysical survey were carried out in 1999 and 2000 by the Cotswold Archaeological Trust.

== Description ==
Severn-Cotswold tombs consist of precisely-built, long trapezoid earth mounds covering a burial chamber. The Stoney Littleton Long Barrow stands on a limestone ridge overlooking Wellow Brook and the village of Wellow. It is constructed from stone, including Blue Lias and Forest Marble quarried within an 8-kilometre (5.0 mi) radius.

It is around 30 metres (98 ft) in length and 15 metres (49 ft) wide at the south-east end, it stands nearly 3 metres (10 ft) high. Internally it consists of a 12.8-metre (42 ft) long gallery with three pairs of side chambers and an end chamber. The passage and entrance are roughly aligned towards the midwinter sunrise. The roof is made of overlapping stones. There is a fossil ammonite impression decorating the left-hand doorjamb.

Unusually, the barrow is not situated on flat ground and "looks as though it is sliding down the side of a hill."

== Gallery ==
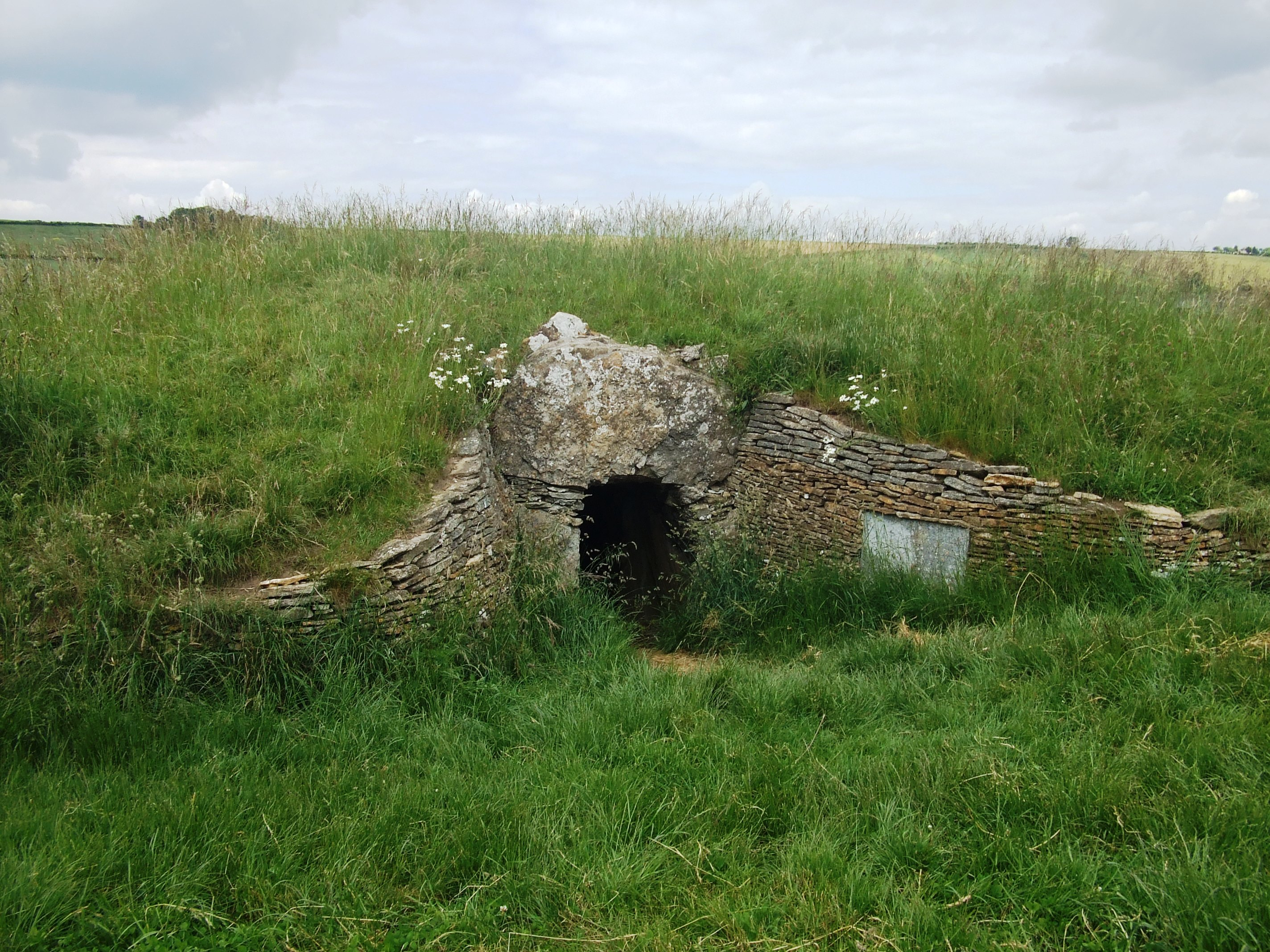
The entrance

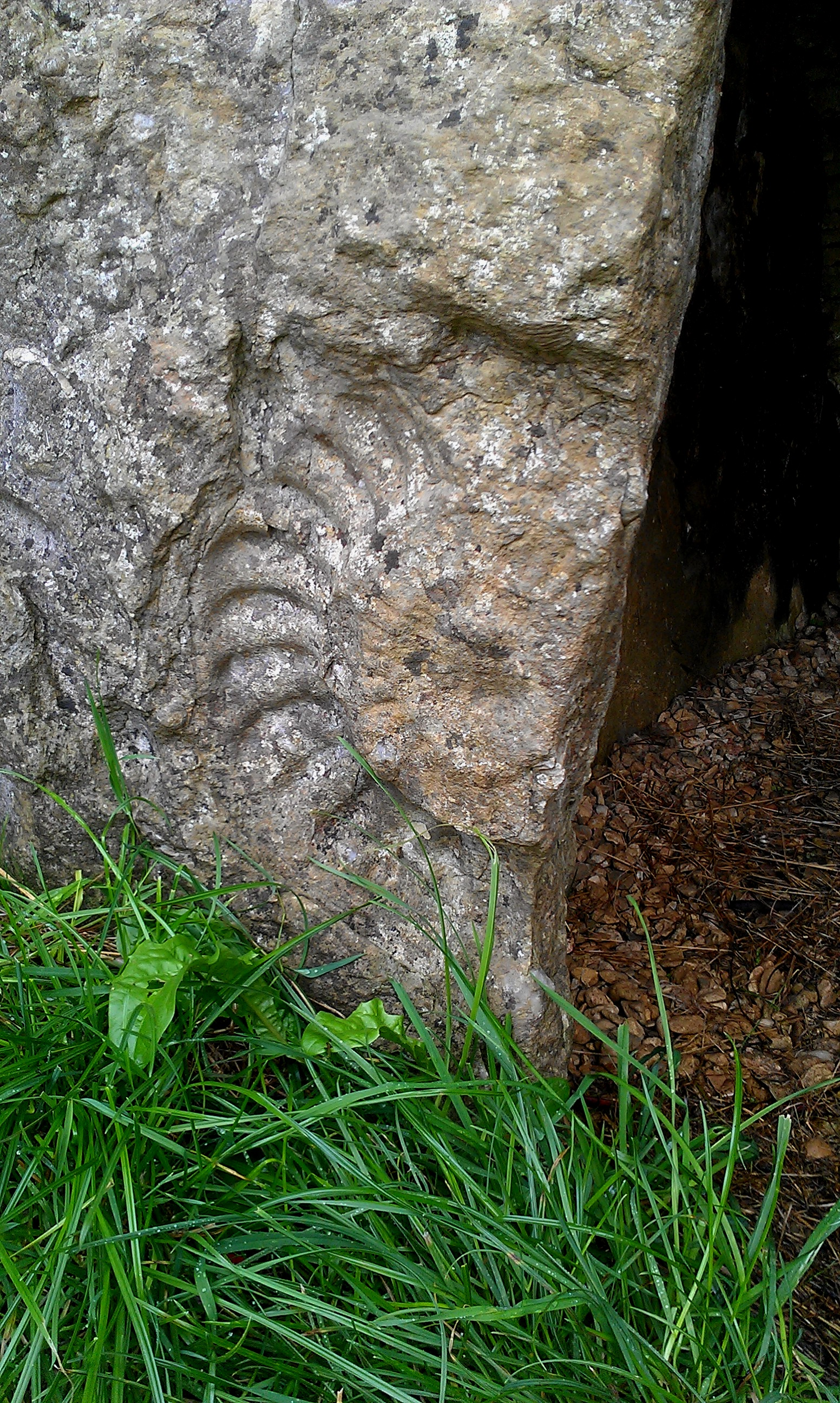
The impression of an ammonite at the entrance to the barrow

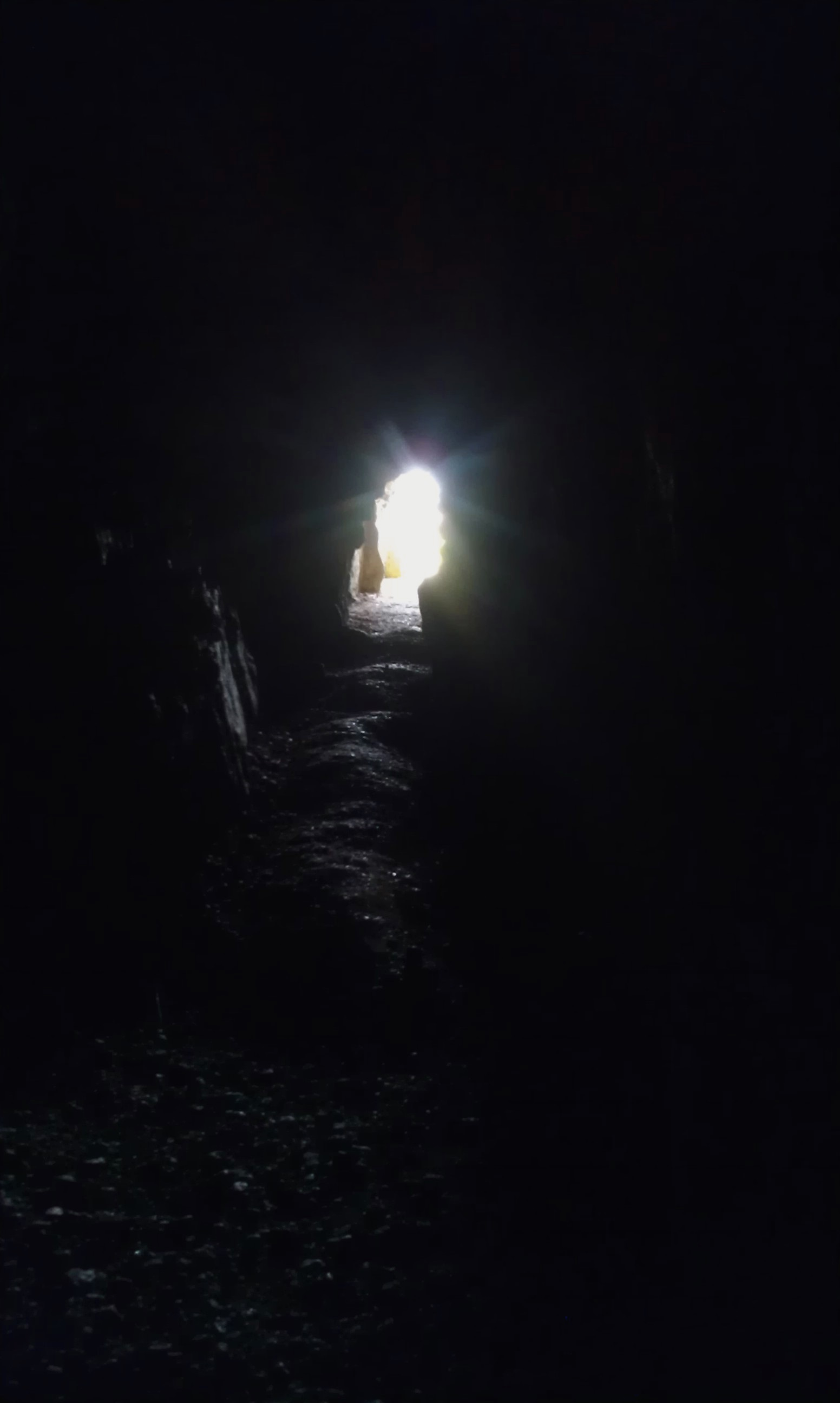
The chamber

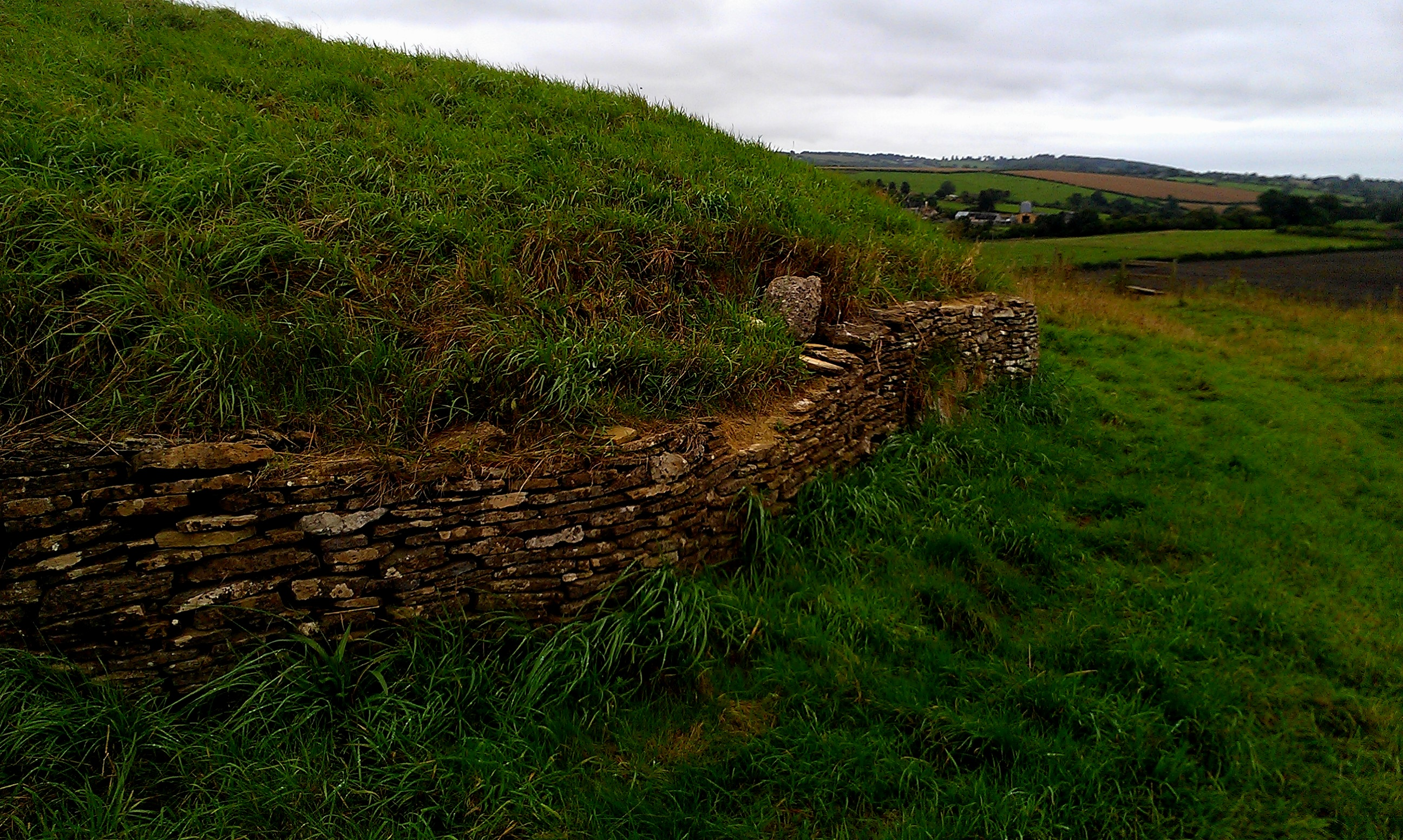
Curved back

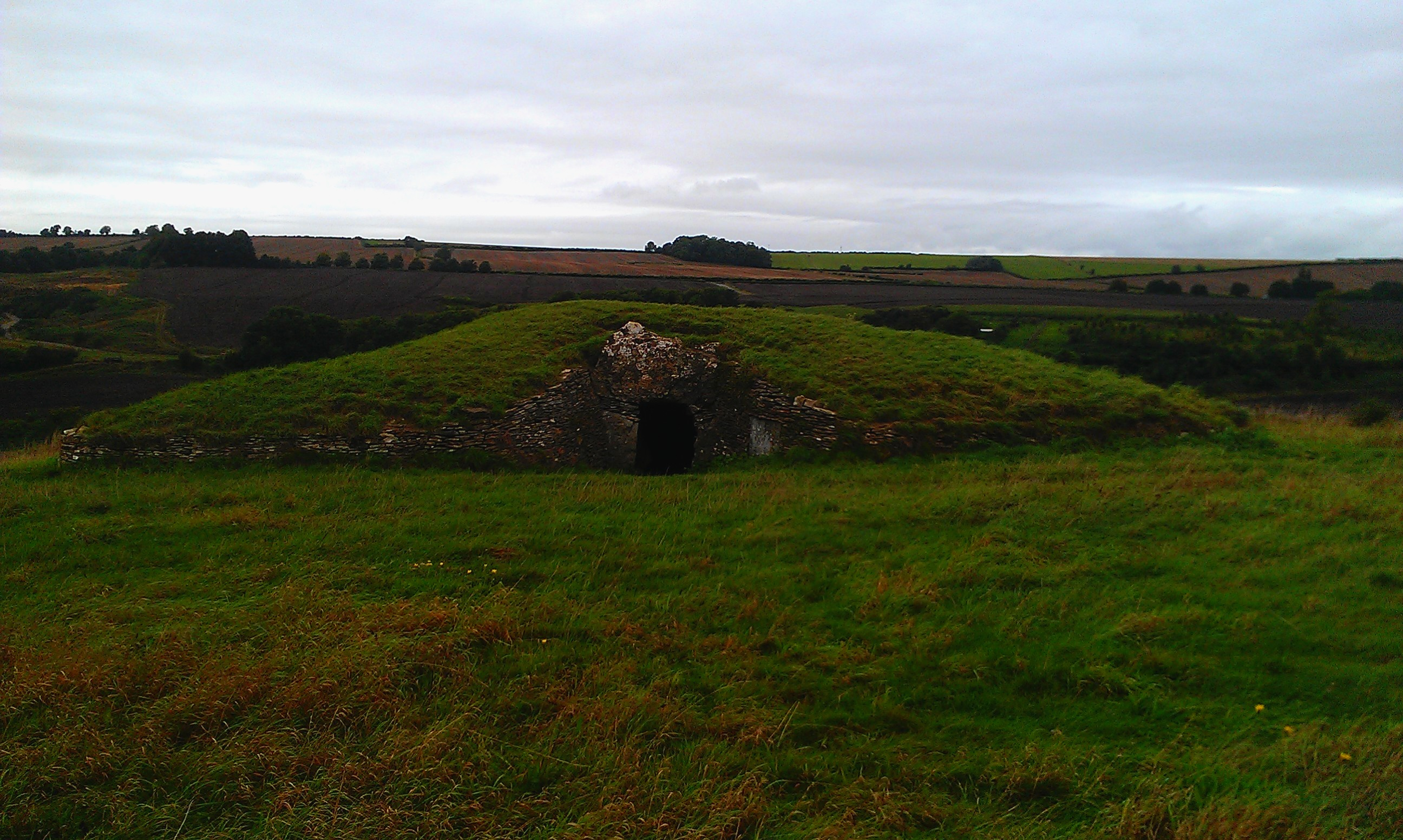
The entrance

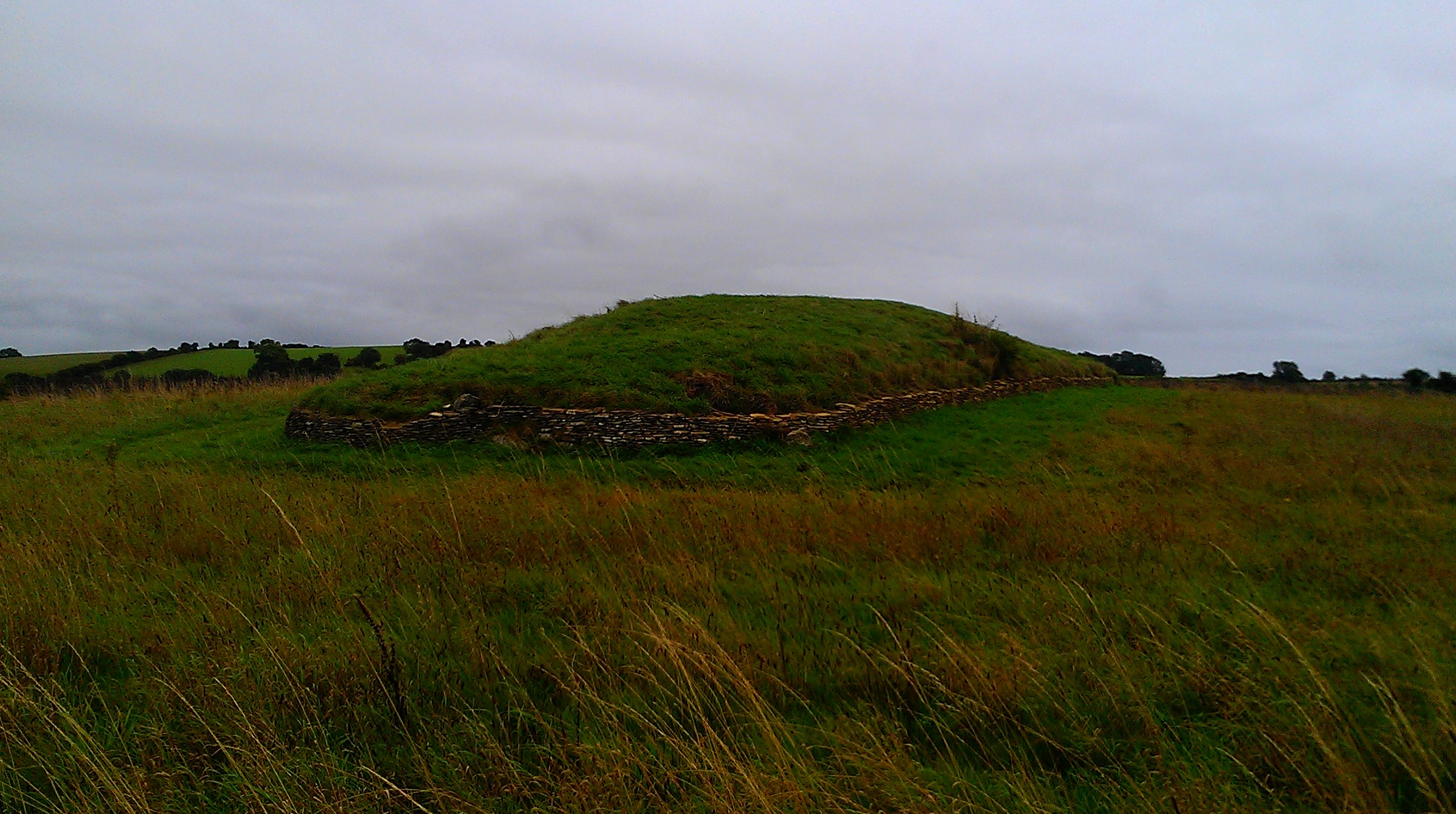
The back end

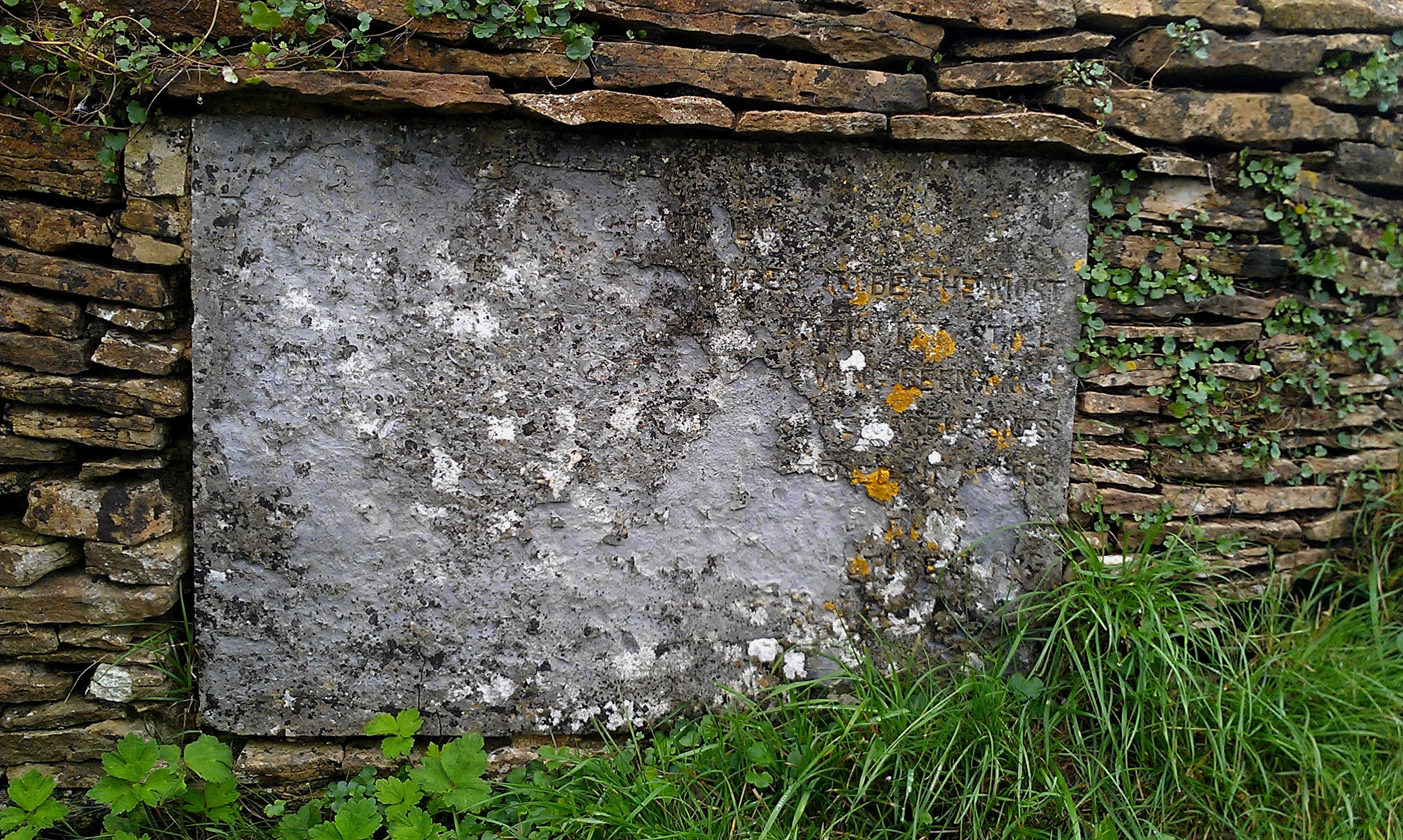
Disfigured plaque

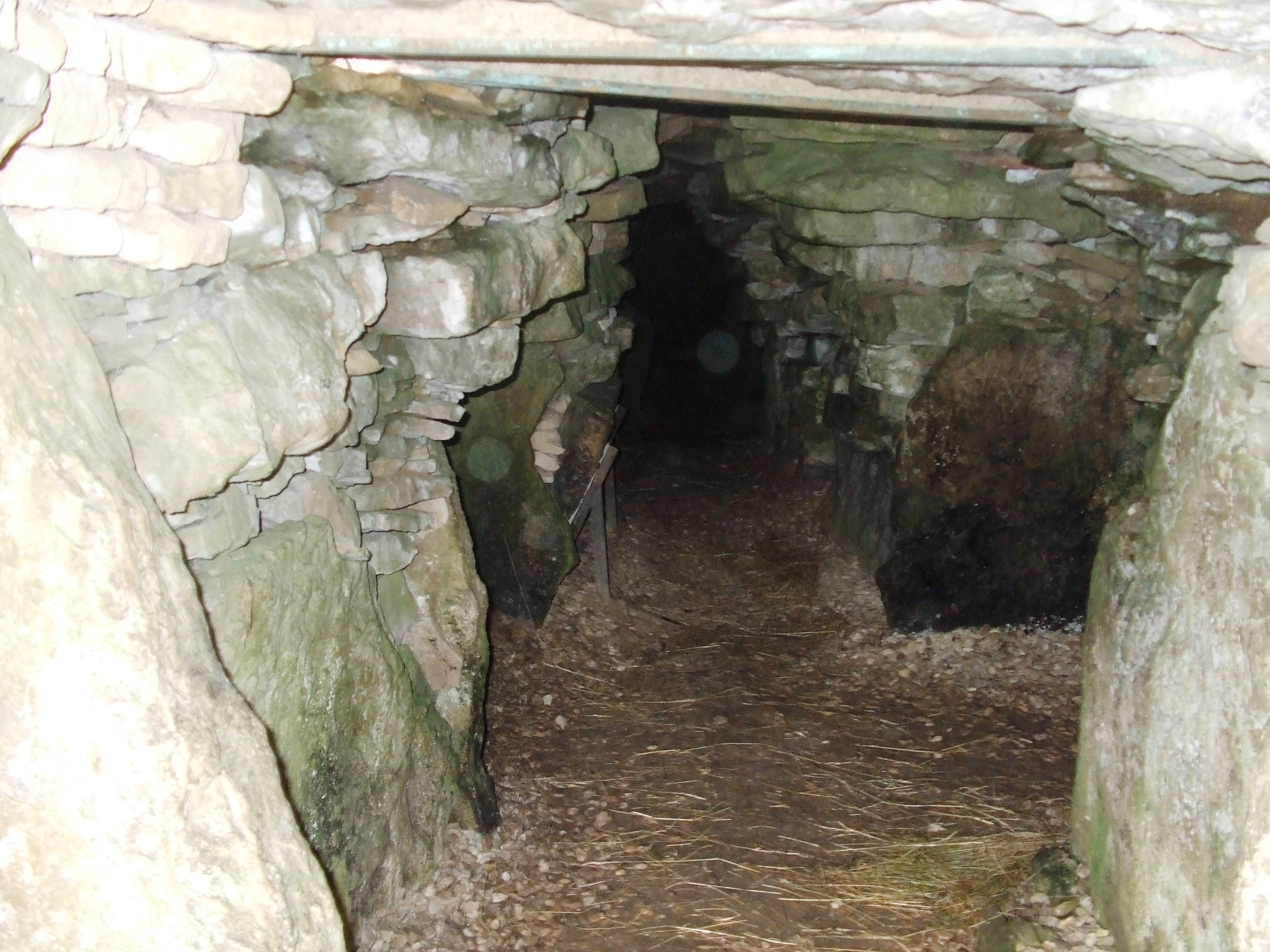
The interior
