= John Skinner (archaeologist) =

British archaeologist (1772–1839)

The Rev. John Skinner (1772–1839) was a parish vicar and amateur antiquarian and archaeologist operating mainly in the area of Bath and the villages of northern Somerset in the early nineteenth century.

== Life ==
Skinner was born in Claverton and educated at Oxford, before becoming vicar of Camerton, Somerset from 1800 to 1839. He excavated numerous antiquities, especially barrows, such as those at Priddy, Stoney Littleton and the site which later became RAF Charmy Down; and he made visits for antiquarian purposes to many places.

He carried out excavations at Priddy Nine Barrows and Ashen Hill Barrow Cemeteries, opening many of the barrows identified cremation burials in an oval cyst which was covered by a flat stone just below where ground level would have been in the Bronze Age. He also uncovered bronze daggers and spear head, decorative amber beads, a bronze ring and a small incense cup.

Before his role as the vicar of Camerton from 1800 to 1839, he worked in a lawyer's office.

His parents were Russell Skinner and Mary Page. He married Anna Holmes in 1805, by whom he had five children, three of whom (Anna, Fitz Owen and Joseph Henry) lived into adulthood.

== Writings ==
He kept a regular journal as rector of Camerton, from 1803 until 1834. A "tormented and querulous" man in the words of Virginia Woolf, but "at the same time conscientious and able", he came to his living at Camerton to be

faced with drunkenness and immorality; with indiscipline and irreligion; with Methodism and Roman Catholicism; with the Reform Bill and the Catholic Emancipation Act, with a mob clamouring for freedom, with the overthrow of all that was decent and established and right.

He bequeathed his 146 volumes of his journals (1803–34), along with travel diaries and antiquarian and other miscellanea, to the British Museum. He stipulated that the journals should not be opened until fifty years after his death. Virginia Woolf observed, "In fifty years after his death, when the diaries were published, people would know not only that John Skinner was a great antiquary, but that he was a much wronged and suffering man." These journals are now preserved at the British Library. The manuscripts include accounts of a West Country tour (1797), Hadrian's Wall (1801) and the isle of Anglesey (1802). His 1802 visit to Anglesey to see the island's Celtic remains, began by rowing across the Menai Strait to land at Llanidan. His view was that the Old Church of St Nidan "seems superior to the generality of Welsh buildings of the kind", with its double roof and two bells, but he also said that "the interior of the building has little to attract notice".

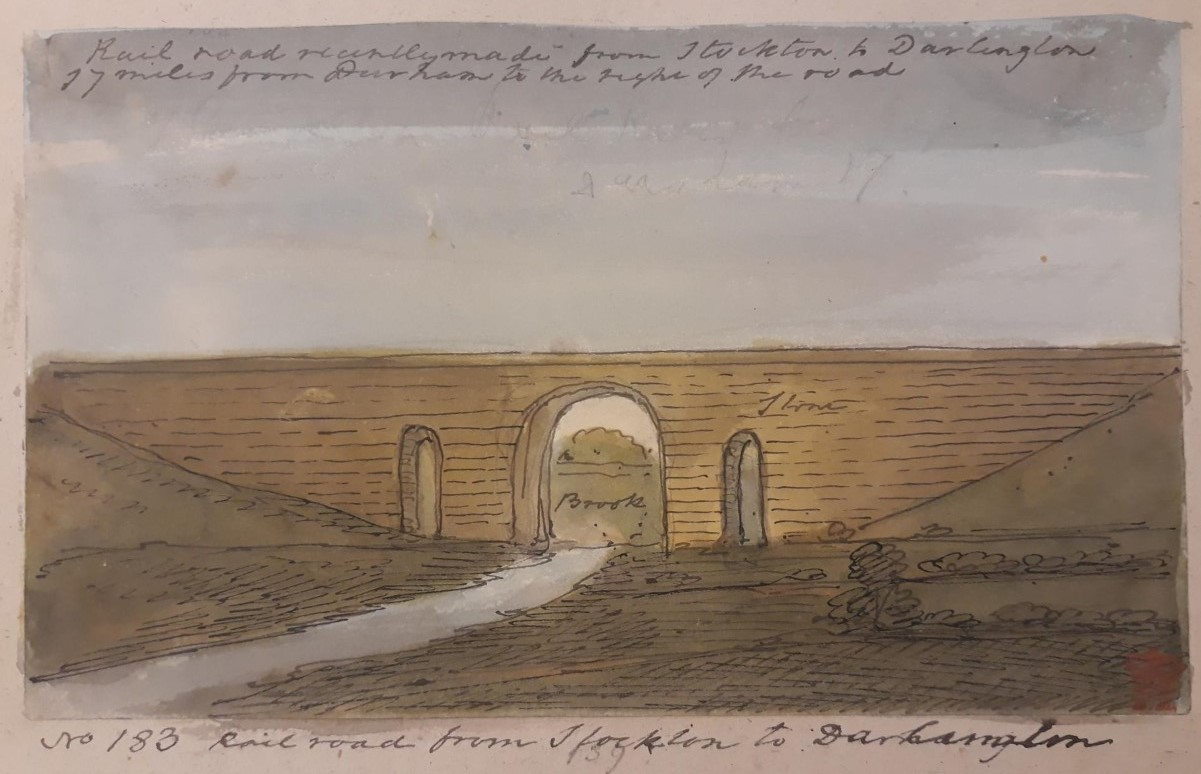
Skerne Bridge, Darlington

His journals were illustrated by many watercolour paintings; among them this August 1825 sketch of the newly-built Skerne Bridge on the Stockton and Darlington Railway. It is significant as the only image of the bridge as it was originally built, before the addition of strengthening buttresses that appear in every other image.

His tour of Wales in 1835, when he was 63, now consists of 4 bound volumes comprising descriptive text and nearly 750 sketches, an average of 15 a day, starting with coastal scenes taken when on the packet from Bristol to Swansea, landscapes, castles, abbeys, cromlechs, inscribed stones and towns, Roman roads, but rarely mansions.

== Death ==
Skinner committed suicide by shooting himself in 1839, despite which he may have been buried in consecrated ground at Camerton. The inquest said that Skinner's "mind had latterly been very much affected" and that he had shot himself in "a state of derangement".
