= Camerton, Somerset =

Village and civil parish in England

Coordinates: 51.3188°N 2.4526°W

Camerton
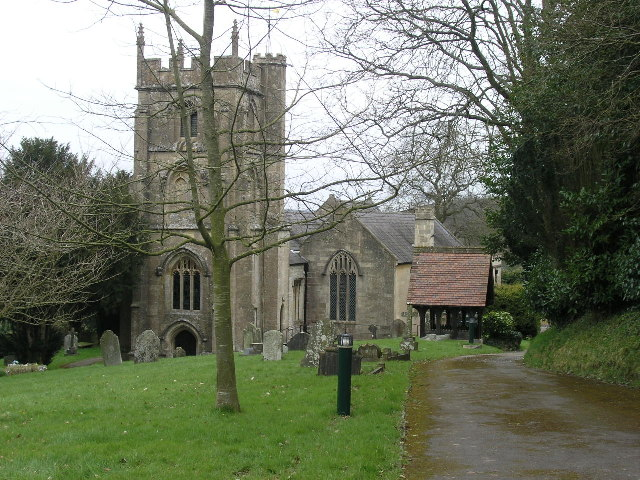
- St Peter's Church

- Location within Somerset
- Population: 655
- OS grid reference: ST685578
- Unitary authority: Bath and North East Somerset
- Ceremonial county: Somerset
- Region: South West
- Country: England
- Sovereign state: United Kingdom
- Post town: BATH
- Postcode district: BA2
- Dialling code: 01761
- Police: Avon and Somerset
- Fire: Avon
- Ambulance: South Western
- UK Parliament: Frome and East Somerset

Camerton is a village and civil parish in Somerset, 6 miles (9.7 km) south west of Bath, lying on the Cam Brook. The parish has a population of 655.

== History ==
The parish includes the hamlet of Tunley, which is the site of a hill fort that has been designated as a Scheduled Ancient Monument.

The village stands beside the route of the Fosse Way, and a Roman settlement was south-west of the current village.

The parish of Camerton was part of the Wellow Hundred.

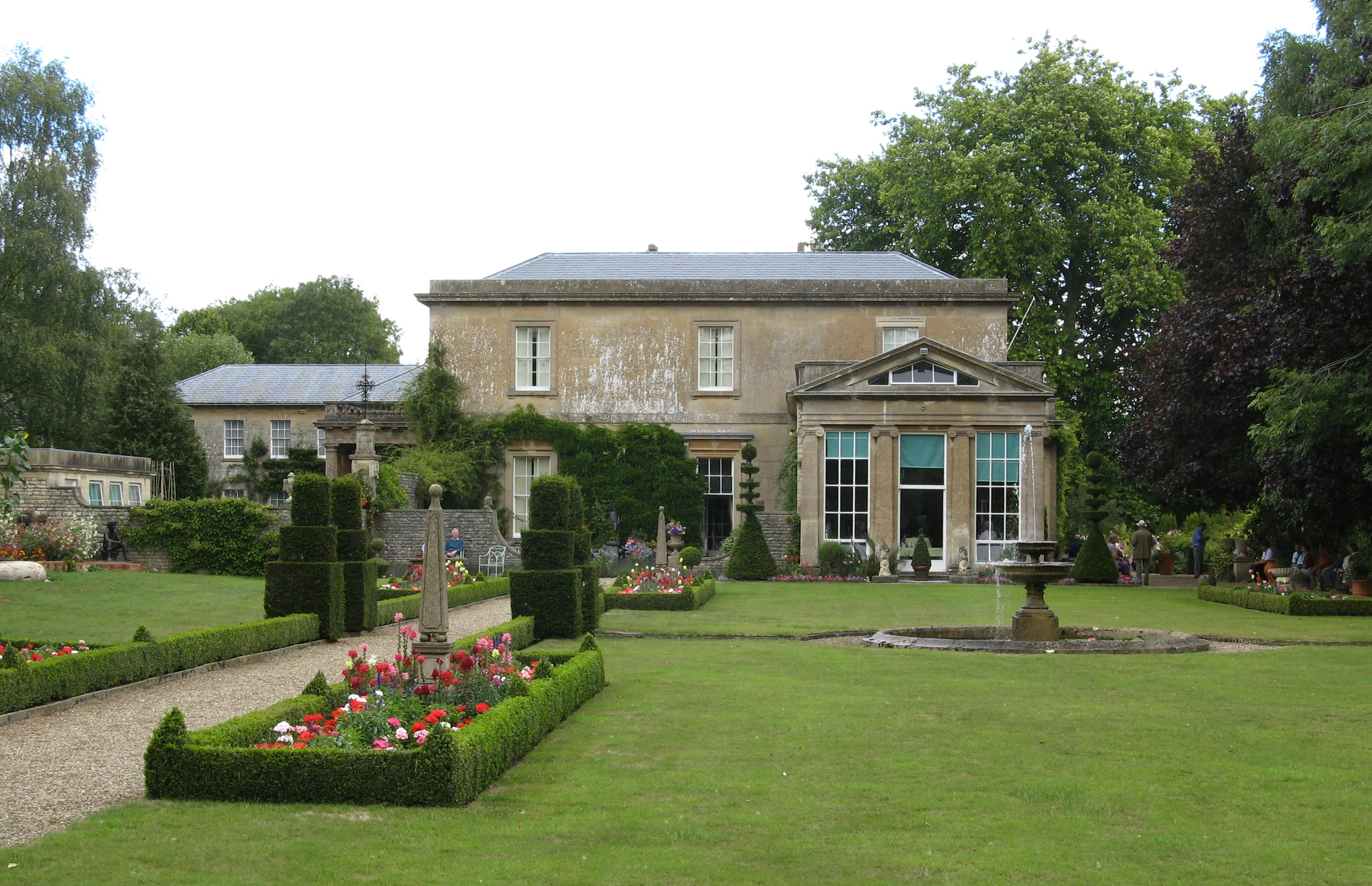
Camerton Court in Camerton Park

Originally a farming village in North Somerset, its vicar from 1800 was the amateur antiquarian and archaeologist The Rev. John Skinner, who committed suicide in 1839. His studies led him to conclude, incorrectly, that Camerton was the location of the notable ancient British site of Camulodunum. Camerton Court was built by the Jarrett family, to a design by George Repton (son of Humphry Repton), in 1838–40, replacing an earlier Manor House.

The village expanded as a result of coal mining on the Somerset coalfield in the 19th century. Camerton New Colliery, which started in the very early 19th century, and Camerton Old Colliery, which predates it by about 20 years. Camerton New Pit survived to be nationalised, eventually closing in 1950. The maximum amount mined was 77,000 tons in 1903. In the centre of the village is an old coal spoil tip or "batch" called Camerton Batch (or Camerton Old Batch to distinguish it from the taller Camerton New Batch which lies just to the east). Camerton Batch was designated as a Local Nature Reserve in 1997.

With the closure of the coal mines, it is now primarily a commuter village for people working in Bristol or Bath. Camerton was also home to the National Osteoporosis Society, before the charity moved to Bath.

In 2007 Camerton was the site of a prosecution by the Environment Agency for the illegal dumping of waste including concrete, tarmac, bricks, blocks, subsoil, metal, fluorescent light tubes, electrical cable and asbestos sheets on the site.

== Governance ==
The parish council has responsibility for local issues, including setting an annual precept (local rate) to cover the council's operating costs and producing annual accounts for public scrutiny. The parish council evaluates local planning applications and works with the local police, district council officers, and neighbourhood watch groups on matters of crime, security, and traffic. The parish council's role also includes initiating projects for the maintenance and repair of parish facilities, such as the village hall or community centre, playing fields and playgrounds, as well as consulting with the district council on the maintenance, repair, and improvement of highways, drainage, footpaths, public transport, and street-cleaning. Conservation matters (including trees and listed buildings) and environmental issues are also of interest to the council.

The parish falls within the unitary authority of Bath and North East Somerset which was created in 1996, as established by the Local Government Act 1992. It provides a single tier of local government with responsibility for almost all local government functions within its area including local planning and building control, local roads, council housing, environmental health, markets and fairs, refuse collection, recycling, cemeteries, crematoria, leisure services, parks, and tourism. It is also responsible for education, social services, libraries, main roads, public transport, trading standards, waste disposal and strategic planning, although fire, police and ambulance services are provided jointly with other authorities through the Avon Fire and Rescue Service, Avon and Somerset Constabulary and the Great Western Ambulance Service.

Bath and North East Somerset's area covers part of the ceremonial county of Somerset but it is administered independently of the non-metropolitan county. Its administrative headquarters is in Bath. Between 1 April 1974 and 1 April 1996, it was the Wansdyke district and the City of Bath of the county of Avon. Before 1974 that the parish was part of the Bathavon Rural District.

The parish is represented in the House of Commons of the Parliament of the United Kingdom as part of Frome and East Somerset. It elects one Member of Parliament (MP) by the first past the post system of election. It was also part of the South West England constituency of the European Parliament prior to Britain leaving the European Union in January 2020, which elected seven MEPs using the d'Hondt method of party-list proportional representation.

== Transport ==
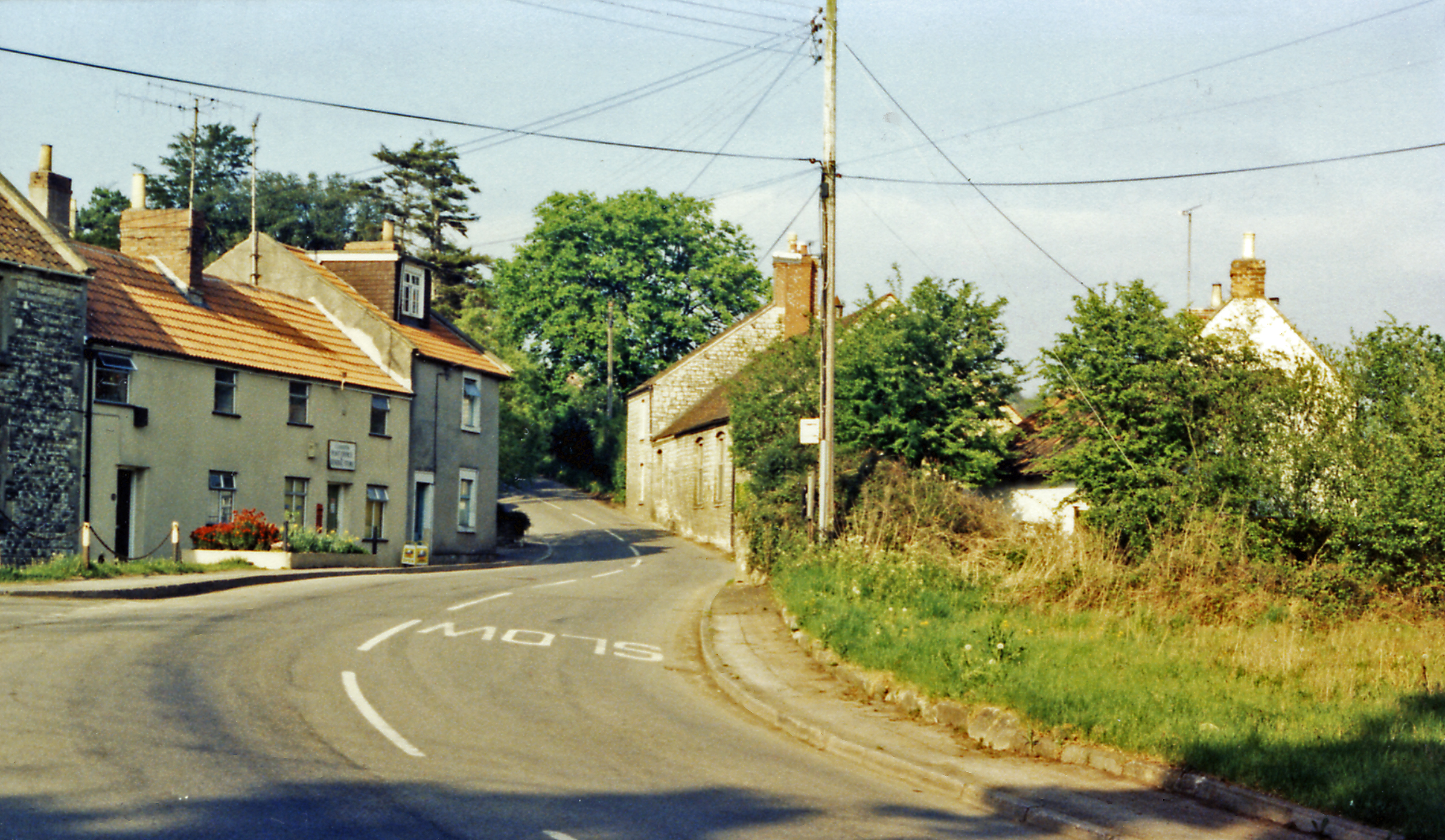
Site of former station in 1987

Camerton once had a branch line from the Bristol and North Somerset Railway (part of the Great Western Railway) mainly for coal. It opened from Hallatrow in 1882 and was extended along the line of the former Somerset Coal Canal to Limpley Stoke in 1910, where it joined with the main line from Bath to Bradford-on-Avon. Traffic on the line was never heavy: passenger services were suspended in 1915, resumed in 1923 and finally withdrawn in 1925. Goods traffic remained until 1951. The Titfield Thunderbolt was filmed on the line shortly after it closed.

== Religious sites ==
The Anglican parish Church of St. Peter dates from the 15th century with addition and renovation in 1638 and again in 1891. It has been designated as a Grade I listed building.

== Notable residents ==
- Actress Ashley Jensen
- Actor Terence Beesley (d.2017)
