= Grade II* listed buildings in Bath and North East Somerset =

Bath and North East Somerset shown within the ceremonial county of Somerset

Bath and North East Somerset (commonly referred to as BANES or B&NES) is a unitary authority created on 1 April 1996, following the abolition of the County of Avon, which had existed since 1974. Part of the ceremonial county of Somerset, Bath and North East Somerset occupies an area of 220 square miles (570 km^{2}), two-thirds of which is green belt. It stretches from the outskirts of Bristol, south into the Mendip Hills and east to the southern Cotswold Hills and Wiltshire border. The city of Bath is the principal settlement in the district, but BANES also covers Keynsham, Midsomer Norton, Radstock and the Chew Valley. The area has a population of 170,000, about half of whom live in Bath, making it 12 times more densely populated than the rest of the area.

In the United Kingdom, the term listed building refers to a building or other structure officially designated as being of special architectural, historical, or cultural significance; Grade II* structures are those considered to be "particularly significant buildings of more than local interest". Listing was begun by a provision in the Town and Country Planning Act 1947. Once listed, strict limitations are imposed on the modifications allowed to a building's structure or fittings. In England, the authority for listing under the Planning (Listed Buildings and Conservation Areas) Act 1990 rests with Historic England, a non-departmental public body sponsored by the Department for Digital, Culture, Media and Sport; local authorities have a responsibility to regulate and enforce the planning regulations.

Bath and North East Somerset has 212 Grade II* listed buildings.

== Buildings ==
=== Bath ===
Name	Location	Type	Completed (Note: The date given is the date used by Historic England as significant for the initial building or that of an important part in the structure's description.)	Grid ref. (Note: The grid reference is based on the British national grid reference system, sometimes known as OSGB36, used by the Ordnance Survey.) Geo-coordinates	Entry number (Note: The "List Entry Number" is a unique number assigned to each listed building and scheduled monument by Historic England.)	Image	Ref.
18 and 19 and attached Railings, New King Street	New King Street	Terraced House	1764-1770	ST7455964891; 51°22′57″N 2°22′01″W	1396262	18 and 19 and attached Railings, New King Street More images	
Abbey Cemetery Partis Tomb	Ralph Allen Drive	Tomb	1846	ST7587763645; 51°22′17″N 2°20′53″W	1396338	Upload Photo	
Abbey Cemetery Williams Tomb	Ralph Allen Drive	Tomb	1848	ST7582363611; 51°22′16″N 2°20′55″W	1396355	Abbey Cemetery Williams Tomb	
Bath District Register Office	Charlotte Street	Register Office	After 1916	ST7463265010; 51°23′01″N 2°21′57″W	1395566	Bath District Register Office	
Bath Spa Station	Manvers Street	Railway Station	c. 1840	ST7524564350; 51°22′40″N 2°21′25″W	1395629	Bath Spa Station More images	
Bathwick Grange	Bathwick Hill	Detached House	1829	ST7651164407; 51°22′42″N 2°20′20″W	1394226	Upload Photo	
Bathwick Hill House	Bathwick Hill	Villa	Circa 1825	ST7658564411; 51°22′42″N 2°20′16″W	1394230	Bathwick Hill House More images	
Bathwick Lodge	Bathwick Hill	Villa	1825	ST7598764770; 51°22′53″N 2°20′47″W	1394183	Upload Photo	
Beau Nash's House, with Railings	St John's Place	Detached House	c. 1720	ST7486264854; 51°22′56″N 2°21′45″W	1394862	Beau Nash's House, with Railings More images	
Bloomfield Crescent Nos. 1-7 (consec.) including Gate Piers	Bloomfield Road	Terrace	Circa 1793-1795	ST7385962902; 51°21′52″N 2°22′37″W	1394793	Upload Photo	
Bridge in Sydney Gardens	Sydney Gardens	Footbridge	1800	ST7587065366; 51°23′13″N 2°20′53″W	1395952	Bridge in Sydney Gardens More images	
Bridge over railway	Sydney Road	Road Bridge	c. 1840	ST7579765199; 51°23′07″N 2°20′57″W	1395307	Bridge over railway More images	
Bridge over railway in Sydney Gardens	Sydney Gardens	Bridge	C1840	ST7581465331; 51°23′11″N 2°20′56″W	1395281	Bridge over railway in Sydney Gardens More images	
Casa Bianca and La Casetta	Bathwick Hill	Villa	Circa 1846	ST7639164512; 51°22′45″N 2°20′26″W	1394246	Upload Photo	
Chandos House	Westgate Buildings	House	1726-30	ST7489864681; 51°22′50″N 2°21′43″W	1395635	Upload Photo	
Christian Centre (formerly The Forum Cinema)	St James's Parade	Cinema	1960-66	ST7499964461; 51°22′43″N 2°21′38″W	1394832	Christian Centre (formerly The Forum Cinema) More images	
Church of Our Lady and St Alphege, with attached Presbytery	Oldfield Lane	Church	1929	ST7390163886; 51°22′24″N 2°22′35″W	1396234	Church of Our Lady and St Alphege, with attached Presbytery More images	
Church of St Mary	Bathwick Hill	Gate Pier	19th century	ST7567965088; 51°23′04″N 2°21′03″W	1394251	Church of St Mary More images	
Church of St Michael	Broad Street	Church	1835-1837	ST7505865017; 51°23′01″N 2°21′35″W	1395025	Church of St Michael More images	
Church of St Michael and All Angels	How Hill	Parish Church	15th century	ST7239364721; 51°22′51″N 2°23′53″W	1395896	Church of St Michael and All Angels More images	
Church of St Saviour	St Saviour's Road	Church	1829-1832	ST7599366350; 51°23′44″N 2°20′47″W	1394886	Church of St Saviour More images	
Church of St Stephen	Lansdown Road	Parish Hall	1993-94	ST7480066043; 51°23′34″N 2°21′49″W	1394265	Church of St Stephen More images	
Church of St Swithin	The Paragon	Parish Church	1779-1790	ST7509265562; 51°23′19″N 2°21′34″W	1394245	Church of St Swithin More images	
Church of St Thomas à Becket	Widcombe	Church	C20	ST 75972 63877	1394116	Church of St Thomas à Becket More images	
Cleveland Baths	Hampton Row	Swimming pool	1815	ST7593265821; 51°23′27″N 2°20′50″W	1396146	Cleveland Baths More images	
Cleveland Bridge and four former Toll Houses	Cleveland Place	Bridge	1827	ST7533765655; 51°23′22″N 2°21′21″W	1394634	Cleveland Bridge and four former Toll Houses More images	
Cleveland House	Sydney Road	House	Converted 1864	ST7588665221; 51°23′08″N 2°20′52″W	1395310	Cleveland House More images	
Compass Abbey Hotel (Part)	No 2, North Parade	House	1740	ST7519164677; 51°22′50″N 2°21′28″W	1395777	Compass Abbey Hotel (Part) More images	
Compass Abbey Hotel (Part)	No 3, North Parade	House	1740	ST7519164677; 51°22′50″N 2°21′28″W	1395779	Upload Photo	
Countess of Huntingdon's Chapel including Chapel House	The Paragon	Church House	1765	ST7501365367; 51°23′12″N 2°21′38″W	1395527	Countess of Huntingdon's Chapel including Chapel House More images	
Cumberland House	1-7, Norfolk Crescent	Crescent	Circa 1810	ST7438464938; 51°22′58″N 2°22′10″W	1395744	Cumberland House	
Doric House and attached Wall	Cavendish Road	House	1803	ST7432265978; 51°23′32″N 2°22′14″W	1395469	Doric House and attached Wall More images	
East Gate	Boat Stall Lane	Town Gate	Possibly C9-C10	ST7517564871; 51°22′56″N 2°21′29″W	1394942	East Gate	
Elim Pentecostal Church	Charlotte Street	Nonconformist Chapel	1854	ST7463764983; 51°23′00″N 2°21′57″W	1395580	Elim Pentecostal Church More images	
Elton House	Abbey Street	House	1699	ST7509664680; 51°22′50″N 2°21′33″W	1394064	Upload Photo	
Eyre Chantry (Roman Catholic Chapel), Perrymead Cemetery	Pope's Walk	Chantry Chapel	by 1863	ST7582663459; 51°22′11″N 2°20′55″W	1406474	Eyre Chantry (Roman Catholic Chapel), Perrymead Cemetery More images	
Fiesole (Youth Hostel)	Bathwick Hill	Villa	1846-1848	ST7640164588; 51°22′47″N 2°20′26″W	1394259	Fiesole (Youth Hostel) More images	
Footbridge over Canal in Sydney Gardens	Sydney Gardens	Footbridge	1800	ST7587265314; 51°23′11″N 2°20′53″W	1395961	Footbridge over Canal in Sydney Gardens More images	
Forecourt Wall, Gatepiers, Gates and Overthrows to Countess of Huntingdon's Chapel	Vineyards	Gate	c. 1765	ST7503765371; 51°23′13″N 2°21′36″W	1395528	Forecourt Wall, Gatepiers, Gates and Overthrows to Countess of Huntingdon's Chapel	
General Joseph Smith Tomb in Church of All Saints Churchyard	Weston	Chest Tomb	C1790	ST7310566368; 51°23′45″N 2°23′17″W	1396358	General Joseph Smith Tomb in Church of All Saints Churchyard	
Gothic Temple in Grounds of Rainbow Wood	Widcombe Hill	Summerhouse	1745	ST7661163743; 51°22′20″N 2°20′15″W	1395766	Upload Photo	
High Pavement and Railings fronting Nos 1 to 10	Portland Place	Raised Pavement	1786	ST7473565640; 51°23′21″N 2°21′52″W	1394404	High Pavement and Railings fronting Nos 1 to 10	
Jupiter Statue in the Botanical Gardens	The Dell, Royal Victoria Park	Bust	1835-8	ST7391465584; 51°23′19″N 2°22′35″W	1394743	Jupiter Statue in the Botanical Gardens More images	
Kennet and Avon Canal Tunnel (under Beckford Road)	Beckford Road	Canal Tunnel	c. 1800	ST7588565453; 51°23′15″N 2°20′53″W	1395965	Kennet and Avon Canal Tunnel (under Beckford Road) More images	
Kennet and Avon Canal Tunnel (under Cleveland House and Sydney Road)	Sydney Road	Canal Tunnel	C1800	ST7588665240; 51°23′08″N 2°20′52″W	1395966	Kennet and Avon Canal Tunnel (under Cleveland House and Sydney Road) More images	
King Edward's School	Broad Street	Teachers House	1752	ST7500465084; 51°23′03″N 2°21′38″W	1395027	King Edward's School More images	
Kirkness House and attached Piers, Railings and Lamp Standards	Edward Street	Apartment	2010	ST7558765075; 51°23′03″N 2°21′08″W	1395428	Upload Photo	
Lansdown Cemetery, Entrance Gates, Piers and Walls	Lansdown Road	Gate Lodge	1848	ST7380567553; 51°24′23″N 2°22′41″W	1394446	Lansdown Cemetery, Entrance Gates, Piers and Walls More images	
Linley House	Pierrepont Place	House	C1730	ST7521764645; 51°22′49″N 2°21′27″W	1394377	Linley House	
Lodge Style	Shaft Road	Detached House	1909	ST7673262632; 51°21′44″N 2°20′08″W	1394909	Upload Photo	
Lyncombe House	Lyncombe Vale Road	Detached House	1742	ST7532563461; 51°22′11″N 2°21′21″W	1395279	Upload Photo	
Manor House	Royal United Hospital	Manor House	Medieval	ST7292166176; 51°23′38″N 2°23′26″W	1395661	Manor House More images	
Monument to Sir Bevil Grenville at National Grid Reference ST7219 7034	Charlcombe	Commemorative Monument	1720	ST7218970345; 51°25′53″N 2°24′05″W	1214434	Monument to Sir Bevil Grenville at National Grid Reference ST7219 7034 More images	
Mortuary Chapel in Abbey Cemetery	Ralph Allen Drive	Cemetery Chapel	1844	ST7587263561; 51°22′14″N 2°20′53″W	1394604	Mortuary Chapel in Abbey Cemetery More images	
Museum Shop, formerly Concert Room	Abbey Church Yard	Museum	2010	ST7507464739; 51°22′52″N 2°21′34″W	1394020	Museum Shop, formerly Concert Room More images	
New Bridge or Newton Bridge	Newbridge	Bridge	1727	ST7167965783; 51°23′25″N 2°24′30″W	1395726	New Bridge or Newton Bridge More images	
No. 14 and attached Railings, Crane and Overthrow	Alfred Street	House	1773-1775	ST7486165253; 51°23′09″N 2°21′46″W	1394140	No. 14 and attached Railings, Crane and Overthrow More images	
No. 1A including a Flight of Steps below to the Right and 3 Bollards	The Paragon	Steps	Pre-1776	ST7504365275; 51°23′09″N 2°21′36″W	1394240	No. 1A including a Flight of Steps below to the Right and 3 Bollards	
No. 20 and attached Garden Walls, Balustrade and Gate Piers	Vineyards	Apartment	1973-1976	ST7502765444; 51°23′15″N 2°21′37″W	1395523	Upload Photo	
Nos. 1 and 2 and attached Steps and Railings	Upper Camden Place	Terraced House	1815	ST7501065857; 51°23′28″N 2°21′38″W	1395461	Upload Photo	
Nos. 14 and 15 The Grapes (No. 14)	Westgate Street	House	17th century Fabric	ST7492364753; 51°22′53″N 2°21′42″W	1395641	Nos. 14 and 15 The Grapes (No. 14) More images	
Nos. 1-7 (consec.) with Railings	Northumberland Buildings	Terrace	1778	ST7487264960; 51°22′59″N 2°21′45″W	1396192	Nos. 1-7 (consec.) with Railings More images	
Nos. 6-26 (Even) Ralph Allen Cottages, and Priory Cottage (No. 26)	Prior Park Road	Terrace	1728-40	ST7551464172; 51°22′34″N 2°21′11″W	1394481	Nos. 6-26 (Even) Ralph Allen Cottages, and Priory Cottage (No. 26) More images	
Oakwood and Bathwick Tower	Bathwick Hill	Villa	Circa 1814	ST7680964315; 51°22′39″N 2°20′05″W	1394280	Upload Photo	
Obelisk	Orange Grove	Obelisk	1734	ST7518464797; 51°22′54″N 2°21′29″W	1394210	Obelisk More images	
Obelisk	Queen Square	Obelisk	1738	ST7479464993; 51°23′00″N 2°21′49″W	1394569	Obelisk More images	
Octagon Chapel (Royal Photographic Society)	Milsom Street	Photographic Gallery	1983	ST7499465011; 51°23′01″N 2°21′39″W	1396027	Octagon Chapel (Royal Photographic Society) More images	
Old Royal Baths	Hot Bath Street	Thermal Baths	1775-1778	ST7496664667; 51°22′50″N 2°21′40″W	1395891	Old Royal Baths More images	
Rear-Admiral Philip Affleck Tomb in Church of All Saints Churchyard	Weston	Tomb	C1799	ST7313166358; 51°23′44″N 2°23′15″W	1396362	Upload Photo	
Retaining Wall and Balustrade West of Railway Line	Sydney Gardens	Balustrade	C1840	ST7582565392; 51°23′13″N 2°20′56″W	1395289	Retaining Wall and Balustrade West of Railway Line More images	
Retaining Wall East of Railway Line	Sydney Gardens	Revetment	C1840	ST7583665394; 51°23′13″N 2°20′55″W	1395287	Retaining Wall East of Railway Line More images	
Roman Catholic Church of St John	South Parade	Roman Catholic Church	1861-63	ST7535264587; 51°22′47″N 2°21′20″W	1394998	Roman Catholic Church of St John More images	
Royal National Hospital for Rheumatic Diseases and Royal Mineral Water Hospital, with railings	Upper Borough Walls	Hospital	1859-1861	ST7495964878; 51°22′57″N 2°21′40″W	1395448	Royal National Hospital for Rheumatic Diseases and Royal Mineral Water Hospital, with railings More images	
Sally Lunn's House	North Parade Passage	House	1622	ST7516264694; 51°22′51″N 2°21′30″W	1395829	Sally Lunn's House More images	
Somersetshire Buildings	Milsom Street	Terrace	1781-1783	ST7495765045; 51°23′02″N 2°21′40″W	1395987	Somersetshire Buildings More images	
St James' Viaduct (Mln110705)	Lower Bristol Road	Railway Viaduct	Built in 1840	ST7504264298; 51°22′38″N 2°21′36″W	1395135	St James' Viaduct (Mln110705) More images	
St James's Portico	Pierrepont Street	Open arcade with accommodation above	c. 1745	ST7523164654; 51°22′49″N 2°21′26″W	1394396	St James's Portico	
Summerhill and attached Balustrades	Sion Hill Place	House	1738	ST7413566253; 51°23′41″N 2°22′23″W	1394976	Summerhill and attached Balustrades More images	
Sydney Gardens Footbridge (Mln110614)	Sydney Gardens	Footbridge	1840-1841	ST7580865270; 51°23′09″N 2°20′57″W	1395282	Sydney Gardens Footbridge (Mln110614) More images	
The Garden House with attached Boundary Walls	Church Street	Boundary Wall	Mid 18th century	ST7598863870; 51°22′24″N 2°20′47″W	1394120	Upload Photo	
The Gymnasium to North of North Road	North Road, Prior Park	Fives Court	c. 1840	ST7642762866; 51°21′52″N 2°20′24″W	1394469	Upload Photo	
The Huntsman Public House	Terrace Walk	House	1748-50	ST7517864698; 51°22′51″N 2°21′29″W	1395323	The Huntsman Public House More images	
The Priory	Prior Park	Estate Cottage	c. 1740	ST7633163086; 51°21′59″N 2°20′29″W	1394465	The Priory More images	
Theatre Royal and former Garrick's Head public house	St John's Place	Theatre	C1720	ST7483464845; 51°22′56″N 2°21′47″W	1394864	Theatre Royal and former Garrick's Head public house More images	
Thomas Warr Attwood Tomb in Church of All Saints Churchyard	Weston	Chest Tomb	1775	ST7311066346; 51°23′44″N 2°23′16″W	1394661	Upload Photo	
Twerton Tunnel: East Entrance (adjoining Carr's Wood)	Lower Bristol Road	Railway Tunnel Portal	C1840	ST7216064985; 51°23′00″N 2°24′05″W	1395139	Upload Photo	
Twerton Tunnel: West Entrance (adjoining Carr's Wood)	Lower Bristol Road	Railway Tunnel Portal	C1840	ST7212965008; 51°23′00″N 2°24′07″W	1395140	Upload Photo	
Twerton Wood Tunnel East Portal	Lower Bristol Road	Railway Tunnel Portal	C1840	ST7197065147; 51°23′05″N 2°24′15″W	1395142	Upload Photo	
Twerton Wood Tunnel West Portal (Mln110915)	Lower Bristol Road	Railway Tunnel Portal	C1840	ST7177865281; 51°23′09″N 2°24′25″W	1395143	Twerton Wood Tunnel West Portal (Mln110915)	
Two Watchmen's Boxes at Holburne Museum	Sydney Place, Bath	Watchman's Box	C1840	ST7563265220; 51°23′08″N 2°21′06″W	1395306	Two Watchmen's Boxes at Holburne Museum More images	
Victoria Art Gallery and Library	Bridge Street	Art Gallery	1897-1900	ST7515064914; 51°22′58″N 2°21′30″W	1394957	Victoria Art Gallery and Library More images	
Victoria Bridge	Victoria Bridge Road	Suspension Bridge	1836	ST7412165008; 51°23′01″N 2°22′24″W	1395490	Victoria Bridge More images	
Victoria Column	Royal Victoria Park, Bath	Obelisk	1837	ST7420565274; 51°23′09″N 2°22′19″W	1394775	Victoria Column More images	
Victoria Gate	Royal Victoria Park, Bath	Gate	1830	ST7424065275; 51°23′09″N 2°22′18″W	1394777	Victoria Gate More images	
Watchman's Box	Norfolk Crescent	Watchman's Box	Circa 1810	ST7436364960; 51°22′59″N 2°22′11″W	1395748	Watchman's Box More images	
1-17, Raby Place	1-17, Raby Place	Stepped Terrace	1823-5	ST7574964981; 51°23′00″N 2°21′00″W	1394598	1-17, Raby Place	
15, Abbey Church Yard	Abbey Church Yard	House	Circa 1720	ST7508664788; 51°22′54″N 2°21′34″W	1394013	Upload Photo	
2 and 2A, Abbey Green	Abbey Green	House	Late C17 or early C18	ST7513564676; 51°22′50″N 2°21′31″W	1394026	Upload Photo	
3, Kingsmead Street	Kingsmead Street	Terrace	1942	ST7478064773; 51°22′53″N 2°21′50″W	1394052	Upload Photo	
8-17, Argyle Street	Argyle Street	Shop	Circa 1789	ST7524664966; 51°23′00″N 2°21′26″W	1394149	8-17, Argyle Street More images	
1-7, Barton Buildings	Barton Buildings	Terrace	1768	ST7486265088; 51°23′03″N 2°21′45″W	1394169	Upload Photo	
10, Bathwick Hill	Bathwick Hill	Villa	Circa 1810	ST7612764615; 51°22′48″N 2°20′40″W	1394193	Upload Photo	
1 and 2, Park Cottages	Park Cottages	House	1831	ST7422265328; 51°23′11″N 2°22′19″W	1394248	1 and 2, Park Cottages More images	
2, Pierrepont Place	Pierrepont Place	House	c. 1740	ST7521164644; 51°22′49″N 2°21′27″W	1394380	Upload Photo	
7-13, Pierrepont Street	Pierrepont Street	House	1740-1745	ST7523064628; 51°22′49″N 2°21′26″W	1394385	Upload Photo	
2-6, Pierrepont Street	Pierrepont Street	House	1740-5	ST7523064628; 51°22′49″N 2°21′26″W	1394387	Upload Photo	
1-10, Portland Place	Portland Place	Apartment	2010	ST7473665653; 51°23′22″N 2°21′52″W	1394403	1-10, Portland Place	
7-11, Quiet Street	Quiet Street	Commercial Office	1824-5	ST7492264968; 51°23′00″N 2°21′42″W	1394594	7-11, Quiet Street More images	
13, Crescent Lane	Crescent Lane	Garden Building	Mid 18th century	ST7453865486; 51°23′16″N 2°22′02″W	1394971	Upload Photo	
19, Crescent Lane	Crescent Lane	House	C20	ST7453865486; 51°23′16″N 2°22′02″W	1394981	Upload Photo	
2-18, Brock Street	Brock Street	Terrace	1763-1767	ST7463565297; 51°23′10″N 2°21′57″W	1395030	2-18, Brock Street	
7, Upper Church Street	Upper Church Street	Stepped Terrace	1770-1780	ST7460365387; 51°23′13″N 2°21′59″W	1395472	Upload Photo	
8, Upper Church Street	Upper Church Street	House	c. 1780	ST7460365387; 51°23′13″N 2°21′59″W	1395474	Upload Photo	
114 and 116, Walcot Street	Walcot Street	House	c. 1800	ST7511065421; 51°23′14″N 2°21′33″W	1395581	Upload Photo	
8-18, Norfolk Crescent	Norfolk Crescent	Crescent	Circa 1800-1820	ST7436364878; 51°22′57″N 2°22′11″W	1395745	8-18, Norfolk Crescent	
1-6, Widcombe Terrace	Widcombe Terrace	Terrace	c. 1805	ST7579364028; 51°22′29″N 2°20′57″W	1395776	Upload Photo	
4, North Parade	North Parade	House	1740	ST7521764679; 51°22′50″N 2°21′27″W	1395782	Upload Photo	
5, North Parade	North Parade	House	1740	ST7521764679; 51°22′50″N 2°21′27″W	1395783	Upload Photo	
6, North Parade	North Parade	Shop	1740	ST7521764679; 51°22′50″N 2°21′27″W	1395787	Upload Photo	
2, North Parade Passage	North Parade Passage	House	Circa 1716	ST7514464693; 51°22′51″N 2°21′31″W	1395824	Upload Photo	

=== North East Somerset ===
Listed buildings in North East Somerset, outside Bath:

Name	Location	Type	Completed	Grid ref. Geo-coordinates	Entry number	Image	Ref.
Archway on street at the entrance to Park House	Keynsham	Augustinian Monastery	Mid 19th century	ST6551868912; 51°25′05″N 2°29′50″W	1384632	Archway on street at the entrance to Park House More images	
Barn, coach house, stable, pigsties and attached outbuildings at Manor Farmhouse	Claverton	Barn	15th century	ST7882264245; 51°22′37″N 2°18′20″W	1214532	Upload Photo	
Barn, to north east of St Catherine's Court	St Catherine	Barn	15th century	ST7776070285; 51°25′52″N 2°19′17″W	1277073	Upload Photo	
Barn to south west of Court Farmhouse	Langridge	Barn	17th century	ST7394969516; 51°25′27″N 2°22′34″W	1288592	Barn to south west of Court Farmhouse More images	
Batheaston House	Batheaston	Detached House	1712	ST7786267462; 51°24′21″N 2°19′11″W	1320532	Upload Photo	
Bridge over River Chew	Stanton Drew	Bridge	13-14th century	ST5967863446; 51°22′07″N 2°34′50″W	1129649	Bridge over River Chew More images	
Chapel Farmhouse	Charlcombe	Farmhouse	15th century	ST7264468710; 51°25′00″N 2°23′41″W	1288604	Chapel Farmhouse	
Chew Court	Chew Magna	Country House	14th or 15th century	ST5776463219; 51°21′59″N 2°36′29″W	1320739	Chew Court More images	
Church of All Saints	Dunkerton	Parish Church	C14	ST7112259298; 51°19′55″N 2°24′57″W	1135797	Church of All Saints More images	
Church of All Saints	Farmborough	Parish Church	15th century	ST6612460569; 51°20′35″N 2°29′16″W	1136439	Church of All Saints More images	
Church of St Andrew	Chew Stoke	Parish Church	15th century	ST5568261952; 51°21′18″N 2°38′16″W	1129632	Church of St Andrew More images	
Church of St Augustine	Clutton	Parish Church	Late 12th century	ST6225858927; 51°19′41″N 2°32′35″W	1320766	Church of St Augustine More images	
Church of St Catherine	St Catherine	Anglican Church	1704	ST7777170250; 51°25′51″N 2°19′16″W	1277121	Church of St Catherine More images	
Church of St James	Southstoke	Anglican Church	c. 1850	ST7465461234; 51°20′59″N 2°21′55″W	1277046	Church of St James More images	
Church of St John the Baptist	Hinton Charterhouse	Parish Church	12th century	ST7765558308; 51°19′24″N 2°19′19″W	1136127	Church of St John the Baptist More images	
Church of St John the Baptist	Keynsham	Anglican Church	c. 1250	ST6542668829; 51°25′03″N 2°29′55″W	1384628	Church of St John the Baptist More images	
Church of St Laurence	East Harptree	Parish Church	Late 12th century	ST5654755974; 51°18′04″N 2°37′29″W	1312831	Church of St Laurence More images	
Church of St Lawrence	Stanton Prior	Church	C12/C13	ST6780362727; 51°21′46″N 2°27′50″W	1129527	Church of St Lawrence More images	
Church of St Leonard	Chelwood	Parish Church	Norman	ST6356361860; 51°21′17″N 2°31′29″W	1320735	Church of St Leonard More images	
Church of St Margaret	Queen Charlton	Anglican Church	19th century	ST6342167010; 51°24′03″N 2°31′38″W	1115380	Church of St Margaret More images	
Church of St Martin	North Stoke	Anglican Church	12th century	ST7037469116; 51°25′13″N 2°25′39″W	1215229	Church of St Martin More images	
Church of St Mary	Charlcombe	Anglican Church	1857-61	ST7485467346; 51°24′16″N 2°21′46″W	1214255	Church of St Mary More images	
Church of St Mary	Compton Dando	Anglican Church	1735	ST6456664655; 51°22′47″N 2°30′38″W	1320443	Church of St Mary More images	
Church of St Mary	Nempnett Thrubwell	Parish Church	12th century	ST5328360400; 51°20′27″N 2°40′19″W	1136164	Church of St Mary More images	
Church of St Mary	Stanton Drew	Parish Church	15th century	ST5978163128; 51°21′57″N 2°34′45″W	1136209	Church of St Mary More images	
Church of St Mary	Swainswick	Anglican Church	Mid-Late C19	ST7565268417; 51°24′51″N 2°21′05″W	1232679	Church of St Mary More images	
Church of St Mary	West Harptree	Parish Church	12th century	ST5603056895; 51°18′34″N 2°37′56″W	1312706	Church of St Mary More images	
Church of St Mary The Virgin	Timsbury	Anglican Church	1826-32	ST6672658603; 51°19′32″N 2°28′44″W	1129594	Church of St Mary The Virgin More images	
Church of St Nicholas	Whitchurch	Parish Church	Late 12th century	ST6122367592; 51°24′22″N 2°33′32″W	1136442	Church of St Nicholas More images	
Church of St Peter	Marksbury	Church	Late 12th century	ST6664962317; 51°21′32″N 2°28′49″W	1320777	Church of St Peter More images	
Church of St Thomas à Becket	Pensford	Parish Church	Late C14	ST6182563694; 51°22′16″N 2°32′59″W	1136393	Church of St Thomas à Becket More images	
Church of The Holy Ghost	Midsomer Norton	Roman Catholic Church	1900-1960	ST6636754238; 51°17′11″N 2°29′01″W	1115202	Church of The Holy Ghost More images	
Church of the Holy Trinity	Newton St Loe	Parish Church	14th century	ST7011264878; 51°22′56″N 2°25′51″W	1129501	Church of the Holy Trinity More images	
Church of The Holy Trinity	Paulton	Anglican Church	1757	ST6499256575; 51°18′26″N 2°30′13″W	1320745	Church of The Holy Trinity More images	
Council Offices	Midsomer Norton	Grille	Mid-Late 18th century	ST6646954207; 51°17′10″N 2°28′56″W	1115164	Council Offices More images	
Court Farmhouse	Charlcombe	Farmhouse	1956	ST7395669541; 51°25′27″N 2°22′33″W	1214263	Court Farmhouse More images	
Dovecot to Manor Farm, with Terrace Walling	Widcombe	Wall	early to Mid 18th century	ST7602963816; 51°22′22″N 2°20′45″W	1394117	Upload Photo	
Dovecote	Wellow	Dovecote	17th century	ST7404258364; 51°19′26″N 2°22′26″W	1115370	Dovecote More images	
Dovecote, to South West of St Nicholas' Church	Kelston	Dovecote	Late C16/early 17th century	ST6984666889; 51°24′01″N 2°26′05″W	1288368	Dovecote, to South West of St Nicholas' Church More images	
Eagle House and the Old Maltings	Bathford	House	Mid C18	ST7888566755; 51°23′58″N 2°18′18″W	1115272	Upload Photo	
Eagle House including balustrade 2m in front of south elevation	Batheaston	Apartment	1956	ST7795068347; 51°24′49″N 2°19′06″W	1115252	Eagle House including balustrade 2m in front of south elevation More images	
Freshford Manor	Freshford	Manor House	early 18th century	ST7901160184; 51°20′25″N 2°18′10″W	1115308	Upload Photo	
Garden building, 100 yards to south of Bathampton Lodge	Bathampton	Bath House	Late C18/early 19th century	ST7775166339; 51°23′44″N 2°19′16″W	1136996	Upload Photo	
Gournay Court	West Harptree	Country House	C1600	ST5598756809; 51°18′31″N 2°37′58″W	1129581	Gournay Court More images	
Hinton House	Hinton Charterhouse	Apartment	1956	ST7751658380; 51°19′27″N 2°19′27″W	1136140	Upload Photo	
Iford Bridge	Freshford	Bridge	C1400	ST8002158898; 51°19′44″N 2°17′17″W	1115316	Iford Bridge More images	
Kelston Park and adjoining service wing and coach house and south retaining wall	Kelston	Country House	C1760S	ST7025766125; 51°23′36″N 2°25′44″W	1215080	Kelston Park and adjoining service wing and coach house and south retaining wall More images	
Lyons Court Farmhouse	Whitchurch	Manor House	15th century	ST6089167423; 51°24′16″N 2°33′49″W	1136453	Upload Photo	
Manor Farmhouse	Corston	Farmhouse	C1628	ST6935865198; 51°23′06″N 2°26′30″W	1312963	Manor Farmhouse	
Manor House	Queen Charlton	Manor House	16th century	ST6338666990; 51°24′03″N 2°31′40″W	1115381	Manor House	
Manor House	Wellow	House	1634	ST7403358310; 51°19′24″N 2°22′27″W	1158529	Manor House	
Manorthorpe and Gardenthorpe	Freshford	Flats	1983	ST7895360124; 51°20′23″N 2°18′13″W	1158028	Upload Photo	
Mausoleum to Ralph Allen, in churchyard to south of St Mary's Church	Claverton	Mausoleum	1764	ST7878264115; 51°22′32″N 2°18′22″W	1214536	Mausoleum to Ralph Allen, in churchyard to south of St Mary's Church More images	
No. 39 (Bailbrook House), London Road West	Bailbrook	House	1790-1802	ST7682266944; 51°24′04″N 2°20′04″W	1394890	No. 39 (Bailbrook House), London Road West More images	
Norman archway in garden wall to rear of number 83 (Vicarage)	Midsomer Norton	Church	Norman	ST6616654367; 51°17′15″N 2°29′12″W	1115176	Upload Photo	
Old Brass Mill	Saltford	Brass Works	Ceased Operation 1924	ST6871467002; 51°24′04″N 2°27′04″W	1384676	Old Brass Mill More images	
Old School Room	Chew Magna	Church House	c. 1510	ST5767363160; 51°21′57″N 2°36′34″W	1135935	Old School Room More images	
Parish Church of St John The Baptist	Northend, Batheaston	Church	12th century	ST7774867910; 51°24′35″N 2°19′17″W	1320501	Parish Church of St John The Baptist More images	
Parish Church of St John The Baptist	Midsomer Norton	Parish Church	15th century	ST6626054191; 51°17′09″N 2°29′07″W	1320561	Parish Church of St John The Baptist More images	
Parish Church of St Nicholas	Bathampton	Parish Church	13th century	ST7772266536; 51°23′51″N 2°19′18″W	1320551	Parish Church of St Nicholas More images	
Church of St Peter	Freshford	Church	15th century	ST7897160159; 51°20′24″N 2°18′12″W	1115302	Church of St Peter More images	
Parish's House	Timsbury	House	Earlier	ST6733858714; 51°19′36″N 2°28′13″W	1135909	Parish's House More images	
Pine House	Northend, Batheaston	House	17th century	ST7779267918; 51°24′35″N 2°19′14″W	1137651	Pine House	
Rectory Farmhouse	Stanton Drew	Farmhouse	Mid 15th century	ST5972263287; 51°22′02″N 2°34′48″W	1129645	Upload Photo	
Retaining wall and central flight of steps, immediately to north east of St Catherine's Court	St Catherine	Steps	17th century	ST7778970237; 51°25′51″N 2°19′15″W	1277187	Retaining wall and central flight of steps, immediately to north east of St Catherine's Court	
Retaining walls and garden walls, enclosing west terrace and bowling green terrace, including central flight of steps to north west of St Catherine's Court	St Catherine	Garden Wall	Late 17th century	ST7774570190; 51°25′49″N 2°19′17″W	1232373	Upload Photo	
Rock House	Bathford	House	early-Mid 18th century	ST7909766893; 51°24′02″N 2°18′07″W	1138297	Upload Photo	
Saltford Manor House	Saltford	Manor House	c. 1160	ST6853267477; 51°24′20″N 2°27′14″W	1384672	Saltford Manor House More images	
Sham Castle	Bathampton	Prospect Tower	1762	ST7660764864; 51°22′56″N 2°20′15″W	1312449	Sham Castle More images	
Stable Block and Coach House	Bath Spa University, Newton St Loe	Coach House	1984	ST6931663953; 51°22′26″N 2°26′32″W	1129477	Upload Photo	
Sutton Court	Stowey	Country House	14th century	ST5968260451; 51°20′30″N 2°34′49″W	1129576	Sutton Court More images	
The Beeches	Chew Magna	House	1762	ST5736863139; 51°21′57″N 2°36′50″W	1129620	The Beeches More images	
The Court	Stanton Drew	House	1753	ST5977763314; 51°22′03″N 2°34′45″W	1136188	The Court More images	
The Grey House	St Catherine	Detached House	Mid-Late 17th century	ST7619670984; 51°26′14″N 2°20′38″W	1277076	Upload Photo	
The Manor House (The Sacred Heart Convent High School)	Chew Magna	House	Late C15-early 16th century	ST5708263274; 51°22′01″N 2°37′04″W	1129609	Upload Photo	
The Old Parsonage	Farrington Gurney	House	Late 17th century	ST6294555581; 51°17′53″N 2°31′58″W	1136471	The Old Parsonage More images	
The Priory	Midsomer Norton	House	early-Mid C17	ST6622854271; 51°17′12″N 2°29′08″W	1115160	The Priory More images	
The Rectory	Chew Stoke	Vicarage	1529	ST5581761904; 51°21′16″N 2°38′09″W	1320747	The Rectory More images	
The Stables, The Old Chapel and the Remains of The Chapel, Walls enclosing Stableyard, Coach House and Greenhouse to Midford Castle	Southstoke	House	1956	ST7595461374; 51°21′03″N 2°20′48″W	1277080	Upload Photo	
Tithe Barn and adjoining Stable and Dovecote and Horse Engine House	Southstoke	Dovecote	Late C16-early 17th century	ST7460561224; 51°20′58″N 2°21′58″W	1277026	Tithe Barn and adjoining Stable and Dovecote and Horse Engine House	
Tithe Barn attached to south end of rectory farmhouse	Englishcombe	Tithe Barn	15th century or early 16th century	ST7164762800; 51°21′49″N 2°24′31″W	1136116	Tithe Barn attached to south end of rectory farmhouse More images	
Walls enclosing a Garden between The Gatehouse and Stables	Newton St Loe	Wall	18th century	ST6934863983; 51°22′27″N 2°26′30″W	1365665	Upload Photo	
Walls, Retaining Walls, Gates, Gatepiers and Central Flight of Steps, enclosing Garden and Terraces, to South of Manor Farmhouse	Claverton	Gate	early 17th century	ST7881964171; 51°22′34″N 2°18′21″W	1214533	Upload Photo	
Warleigh Manor School	Bathford	Country House	1814-15	ST7913864818; 51°22′55″N 2°18′04″W	1157904	Warleigh Manor School More images	
Watercress Cottage	Combe Hay	House	1624	ST7339059939; 51°20′16″N 2°23′00″W	1115367	Upload Photo	
Wellow House, including Boundary Wall, Gate and Two Pairs of Gatepiers to road	Wellow	House	17th century	ST7387158213; 51°19′21″N 2°22′35″W	1158552	Upload Photo	
Welton Manor House	Midsomer Norton	Manor House	1620	ST6698855053; 51°17′37″N 2°28′29″W	1136842	Upload Photo	
Whitehaven	Bathford	Country House	1748	ST7906866940; 51°24′04″N 2°18′08″W	1137983	Upload Photo	
108 and 110, Northend	Batheaston	House	Mid-Late C17	ST7794368294; 51°24′48″N 2°19′07″W	1115244	Upload Photo	
15, The Batch	Batheaston	House	early C18	ST7778067476; 51°24′21″N 2°19′15″W	1312374	Upload Photo	
37, Priory Close	Midsomer Norton	Bungalow	Modern	ST6614854302; 51°17′13″N 2°29′12″W	1115178	Upload Photo	

== See also ==
- Grade II* listed buildings in Somerset
- Grade I listed buildings in Bath and North East Somerset
