= Brass mill =

Infrastructure related to metallurgy

A brass mill is a mill which processes brass. Brass mills are common in England; many date from long before the Industrial Revolution.

Examples of brass mills include

- Brassmill (Ross on Wye)
- Saltford Brass Mill

== See also ==
- Calamine brass
- Latten
- William Champion
