= Saltford Brass Mill =

- Brass Battery
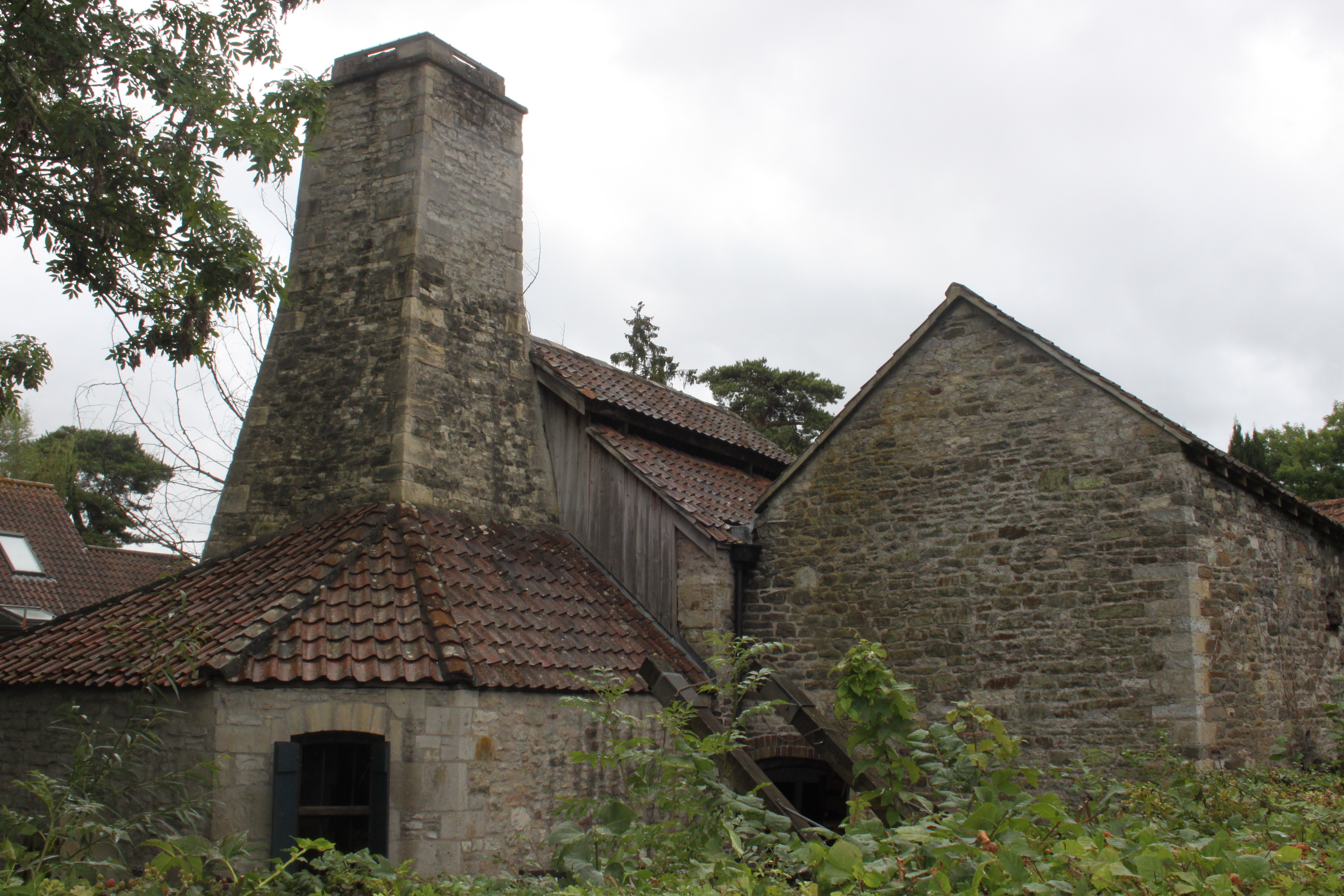

- Location within Somerset
- 51°24′04″N 2°27′04″W
- Location: Saltford, Somerset, England

History
- Built: 1720s

Listed Building – Grade II*
- Official name: Old Brass Mill
- Designated: 19 June 1975
- Reference no.: 1384676

Scheduled monument
- Official name: Saltford brass battery mill
- Reference no.: 1004607

Saltford Brass Mill is a brass mill on the River Avon at Saltford, Somerset, England. It dates from the 1720s is listed as Grade II* and is also a Scheduled Ancient Monument.

There was a watermill on the site at the time of the Domesday Book and it is the last surviving of over 30 mills which were once on this stretch of the Avon.

Local brass making was initiated in Bristol around 1700 by the family of Abraham Darby who later moved upstream because of the better water supply at Saltford and Keynsham. The brass was made from Cornish ores refined at Crew's Hole and then transported via the river. These were mixed with calamine from the Mendip Hills to make calamine brass. This changed as processes improved and local copper smelting was replaced by supplies from Swansea. By the 1850s zinc metal was used instead of calamine, using a process introduced by William Champion, who lived nearby.

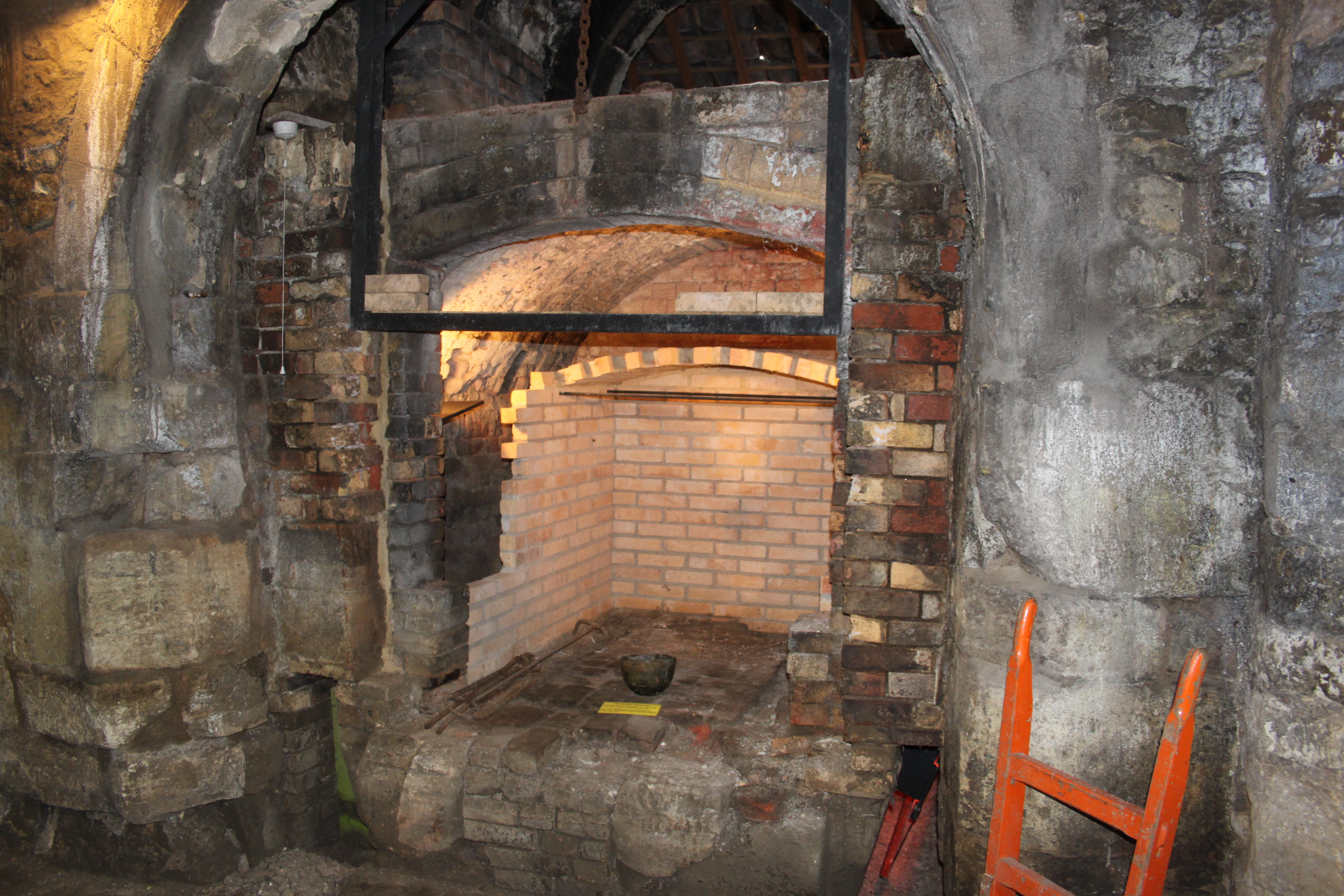
The Annealing furnace

The site includes a battery mill which was used for hollowing out brass sheet to make pans, bowls and vats, some of which are on display. There is also a complete annealing furnace, one of four originally installed, which were used to heat the brass to reduce the likelihood of it cracking while it was being worked. The furnace is claimed to be one of the best remaining examples of this technology. There are also the remains of the water wheels initially used to power the machinery, one of which is still in working order. The battery mills were supplemented by rolling mills between 1760 and 1830, as this produced more even sheets of metal than the original battery techniques. However battery ware was still produced at the site until 1908, the last mill in Britain to do so.

The mill ceased production in 1924. In 1995 it was restored and is now supported by a group of volunteers in conjunction with English Heritage and the owners Bath and North East Somerset Council.

== Bibliography ==
- Day, Joan (1973). Bristol brass: a history of the industry. David & Charles.
