= Pierrepont Place, Bath =

Street in Bath, England

Coordinates: 51.380353°N 2.357585°W

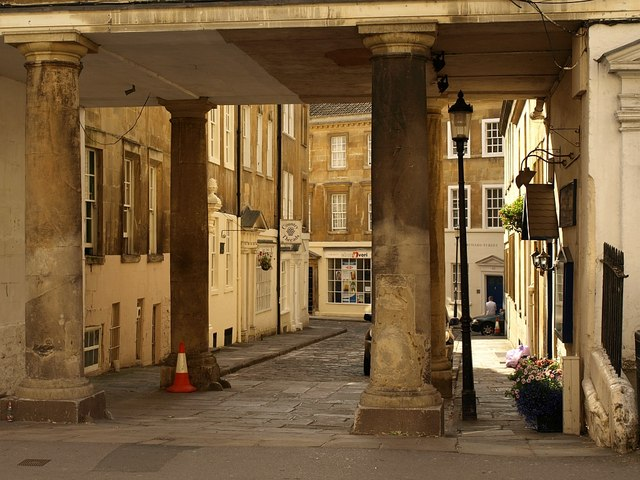
Pictured in 2008, viewed from Pierrepont Street

Pierrepont Place is a mews street in Bath, England. Records indicate that Pierrepont Place and properties on it were built by John Wood the Elder between 1732 and 1748, on land once belonging to monks of Bath Abbey, who had used it as an orchard.

Most houses on the street are listed Georgian townhouses and include No. 2 (Grade II* listed and built c. 1740), Nos. 3, 4 and 5 (Grade II listed, built 1740–50) and the Masonic Hall, previously the Old Orchard Street Theatre (Grade 2, built 1750). No. 5 Pierrepont Place was previously owned by the Bath Freemasons for 200 years, after they purchased the house along with the theatre building in 1809 for £25.

== History ==
Bath Abbey, formally known as Priory Church, had an orchard which was given to the city by Edmund Colthurst in 1572. The land was then sold in 1612 to John Hall of Bradford-on-Avon and was passed through the family for a century. It was not until 1711 that the Hall's estate went to Rachel Bayntun, who became Countess of Kingston. Her husband died in 1713, possibly of smallpox, and she herself died in 1722. Her son Evelyn succeeded to the Bath estate and the dukedom in 1726.

Around 1732–1744, Evelyn Pierrepont, 2nd Duke of Kingston-upon-Hull, sold the old Bath Abbey Orchards land in Bath to John Wood the Elder and his business partner James Leake who went on to design and construct housing and named the streets 'Pierrepont Place' and 'Pierrepont Street' in homage to Eveyln and the family; Evelyn continued to live in Bath, however, until his death. Residents in Pierrepont Place are still required to honour the annual payment of £4 to the successors of the Duke's estate as per the original lease agreement.

The Linley House, at 1 Pierrepoint Place, was named after the musician and manager of London's Drury Lane Theatre (from 1774) Thomas Linley, who lived there with his family. It was built around 1730 and has since been converted from residential use into offices. It is a Grade II* listed building. Number 2 was built around 1740 and has a 19th-century shop window. Numbers 7 to 13 were added between 1740 and 1745, and numbers 14 to 17 at the end of that period.

== Bath Society ==
The Masonic Hall at the end of the street was previously Old Orchard Street Theatre, the Theatre Royal in Bath. Jane Austen knew it well, having attended in 1799 and written about it in Northanger Abbey.

== See also ==
- Grade II* listed buildings in Bath and North East Somerset
