= Latten =

Loose term for a variety of copper alloys used since the Middle Ages

Historically, the term "latten" referred loosely to the copper alloys such as brass or bronze that appeared in the Middle Ages and through to the late-18th and early-19th centuries. Such alloys were used for monumental brasses, in decorative effects on borders, rivets or other details of metalwork (particularly armour), in livery and pilgrim badges or funerary effigies. Latten commonly contained varying amounts of copper, tin, zinc and lead, giving it characteristics of both brass and bronze. Metalworkers commonly formed latten in thin sheets and used it to make church utensils. Brass of this period is made through the calamine brass process, from copper and zinc ore. (Later brass was made with zinc metal from Champion's smelting process and is not generally referred to as "latten".) This calamine brass was generally manufactured as hammered sheet or "battery brass" (hammered by a "battery" of water-powered trip hammers), and cast brass was rare.

"Latten" also refers to a type of tin plating on iron (or possibly some other base metal), which is known as white latten; and black latten refers to laten-brass, which is brass milled into thin plates or sheets.

The term "latten" has also been used, rarely, to refer to lead alloys.

In general, metal in thin sheets is characterised as "latten", e.g. gold latten, and lattens (plural) refers to metal sheets between 1/64" and 1/32" in thickness.
