= The Paragon, Bath =

Grade I listed street in Bath, England

The Paragon
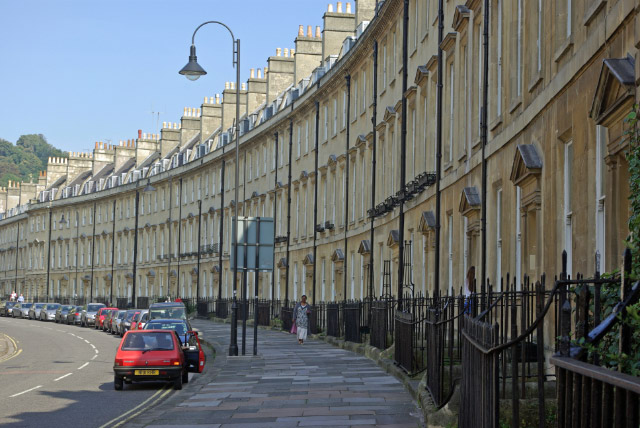

- Location within Somerset
- 51°23′12″N 2°21′36″W
- Location: Bath, Somerset, England

History
- Built: 1768

Site notes
- Architect: Thomas Warr Attwood
- Architectural style: Georgian

Listed Building – Grade I
- Official name: 1 to 21, Paragon
- Designated: 12 June 1950
- Reference no.: 1394239

Listed Building – Grade II
- Official name: Axford's Buildings
- Designated: 12 June 1950
- Reference no.: 1394242

Listed Building – Grade II
- Official name: Walcot Church House
- Designated: 11 August 1972
- Reference no.: 1394243

Listed Building – Grade II
- Official name: Walcot Cemetery gate and wall
- Designated: 12 June 1950
- Reference no.: 1394247

The Paragon in the Walcot area of Bath, Somerset, England is a street of Georgian houses which have been designated as listed buildings. It was designed by Thomas Warr Attwood. It now forms part of the A4.

Numbers 1 to 21 are 3 storey houses with mansard roofs. Each building has matching doors and windows with central pediments and flat entablatures either side of the 1st floor windows and Tuscan pilasters and pediments to the doorways.

Numbers 22 to 37 continue the theme from numbers 1 to 21 and were completed in 1775 by Joseph Axford, a local mason. Numbers 28 to 32 were damaged by bombing during World War II but have since been restored.

== History ==
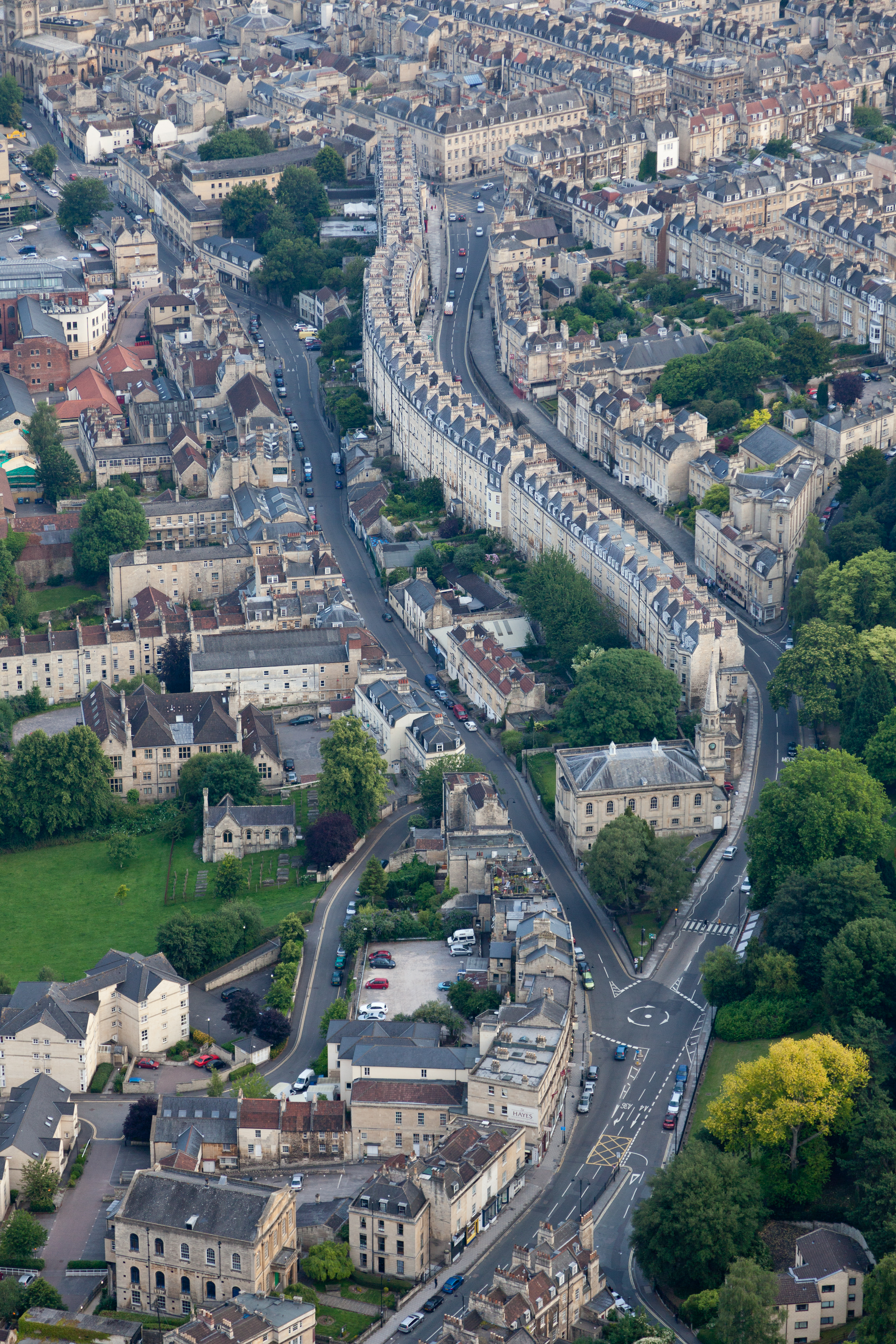
The Paragon

The Paragon is possibly a Roman road, leading north from Aquae Sulis and linking with the Fosse Way, although mapping evidence indicates it is likely medieval in origin. Nonetheless, Walcot originally grew as a Roman residential area in the 1st to 3rd centuries.

St Swithin's Church was built between 1779 and 1790 by John Palmer. On 30 May 1797 the abolitionist William Wilberforce and Barbara Spooner Wilberforce were married in the church. In 1805 it was the burial place of the writer and poet Christopher Anstey and, in 1831 of Rear Admiral Sir Edward Berry. The church house which forms number 38 The Paragon was built in the early 18th century. The adjoining cemetery has gates with a rusticated base and panels with inverted torches between pilasters. There is an entablature with metopes and triglyphs.

The Museum of Bath Architecture lies just off the Paragon in a courtyard, in a building which was built in 1765 as the Trinity Presbyterian Church. It is also known as the Countess of Huntingdon's Chapel, as she lived in the attached house from 1707–1791.

During the Bath Blitz of 25/26 April 1942, one of the retaliatory raids on England by the Baedeker Blitz following the RAF's raid on Lübeck, a bomb fell into The Paragon, demolishing several of the houses. These have since been reconstructed in the original style.

== See also ==
- List of Grade I listed buildings in Bath and North East Somerset
