= Portland Place, Bath =

Portland Place
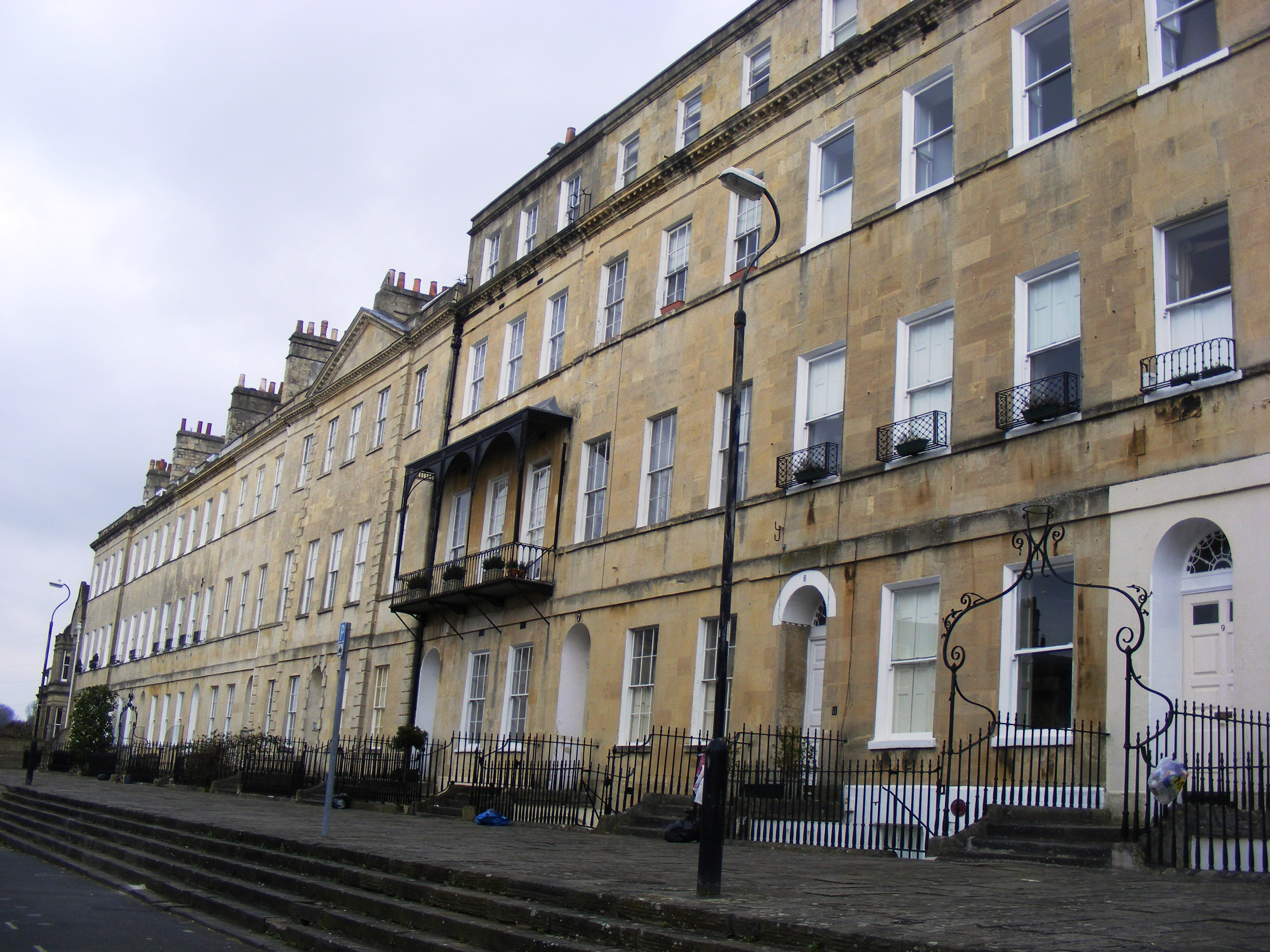

- Location within Somerset
- 51°23′22″N 2°21′51″W
- Location: Bath, Somerset, England

History
- Built: 1786

Site notes
- Architectural style: Georgian

Listed Building – Grade II*
- Official name: 1-10, Portland Place
- Designated: 12 June 1950
- Reference no.: 1394403

Listed Building – Grade II*
- Official name: High Pavement and railings fronting Nos 1 to 10
- Designated: 11 August 1972
- Reference no.: 1394404

Listed Building – Grade II
- Official name: No. 13 and attached railings
- Designated: 11 August 1972
- Reference no.: 1394405

Listed Building – Grade II
- Official name: No. 14 and attached railings
- Designated: 11 August 1972
- Reference no.: 1394406

Listed Building – Grade II
- Official name: No. 16 and attached railings
- Designated: 11 August 1972
- Reference no.: 1394407

Listed Building – Grade II
- Official name: No. 17 and attached railings
- Designated: 11 August 1972
- Reference no.: 1394408

Listed Building – Grade II
- Official name: No. 18 and attached railings
- Designated: 11 August 1972
- Reference no.: 1394409

Listed Building – Grade II
- Official name: No. 19 and attached railings
- Designated: 11 August 1972
- Reference no.: 1394413

Listed Building – Grade II
- Official name: No. 20 and attached railings, wall and ironwork
- Designated: 11 August 1972
- Reference no.: 1394419

Portland Place in Bath, Somerset, England was built around 1786 and many of the houses have been designated as listed buildings.

Numbers 1 to 10 including numbers 4 and 5 which were used as Hermitage House School are Grade II* listed (and before 2010 were Grade I listed), as is the high pavement in front of them. In the centre of the steps is a double ramp which was built to enable easier access for sedan chairs.

Numbers 13, 14 and 16 are Grade II listed. Numbers 17 to 20 follow a similar style and are also Grade II listed. Numbers 17 and 20 have Roman Doric doorcases with pediments.

== See also ==
- Grade II* listed buildings in Bath and North East Somerset
