= Bathwick Hill =

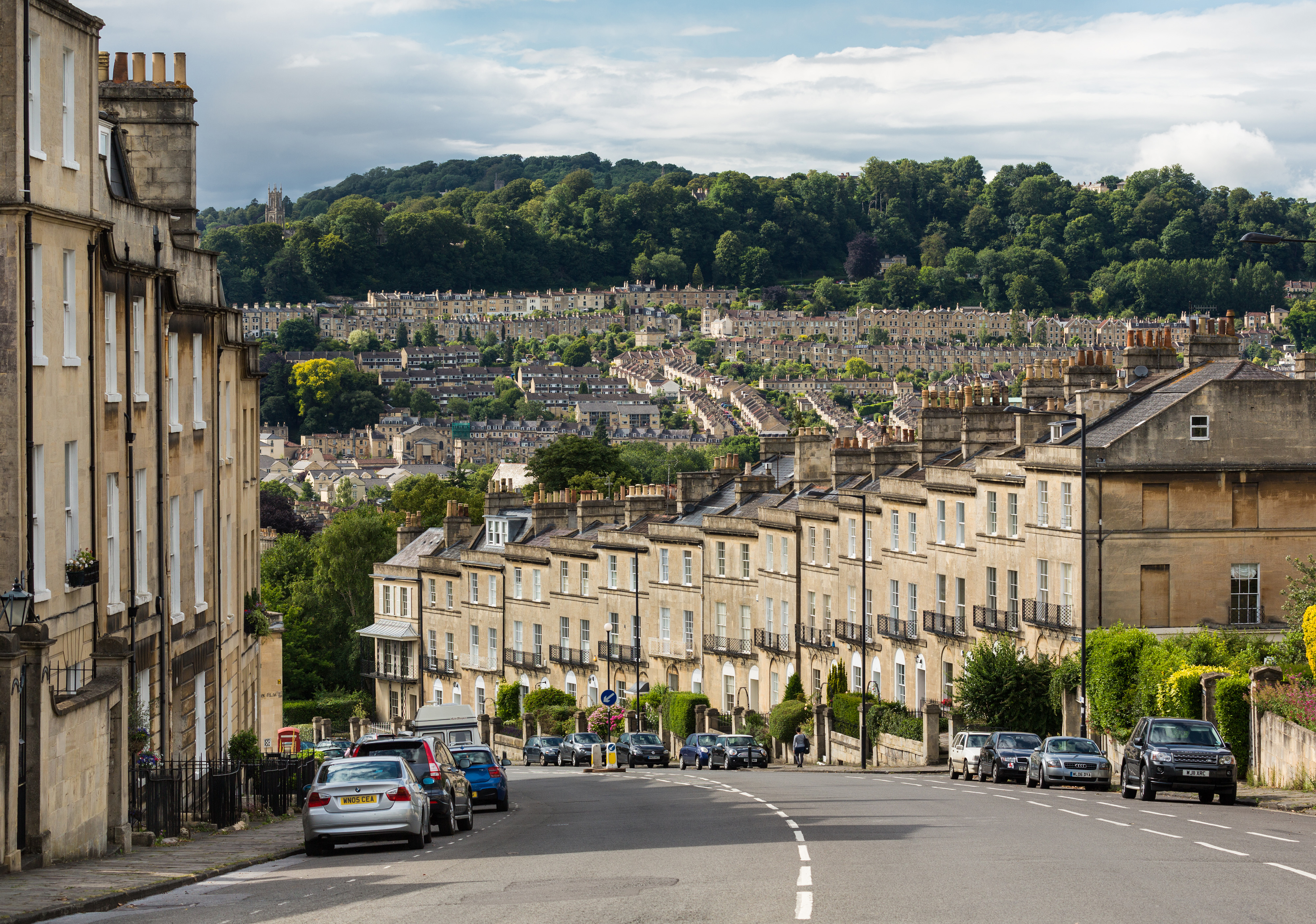

- Location within Somerset
- 51°22′46″N 2°20′34″W
- Location: Bath, Somerset, England

Listed Building – Grade II*
- Official name: Number 10
- Designated: 12 June 1950
- Reference no.: 1394193

Listed Building – Grade II
- Official name: Canal bridge
- Designated: 5 August 1975
- Reference no.: 444245

Listed Building – Grade II
- Official name: Railway Tunnel
- Designated: 5 August 1975
- Reference no.: 444215

Listed Building – Grade II
- Official name: Number 1
- Designated: 11 August 1972
- Reference no.: 442231

Listed Building – Grade II
- Official name: Numbers 11 to 13
- Designated: 11 August 1972
- Reference no.: 442320

Listed Building – Grade II
- Official name: Number 14
- Designated: 11 August 1972
- Reference no.: 442321

Listed Building – Grade II
- Official name: The Wite Lodge (No 15)
- Designated: 11 August 1972
- Reference no.: 442322

Listed Building – Grade II
- Official name: Number 17
- Designated: 11 August 1972
- Reference no.: 442323

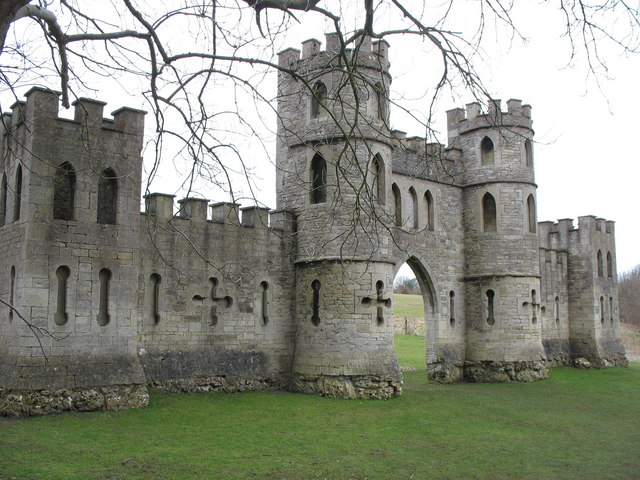
Sham Castle, Bath

Bathwick Hill is a street lined with historic houses in Bath, Somerset, England, many of which are designated as listed buildings. It climbs south east from the A36 towards the University of Bath on Claverton Down, providing views over the city.

To the north is Sham Castle, a folly built in 1762 by Richard James, master mason for Ralph Allen, "to improve the prospect" from Allen's town house in Bath.

As the hill rises away from the city centre it passes over a tunnel, built in 1840, on the Great Western Railway close to Bath Spa railway station and the Kennet and Avon Canal at Bath Locks via an elliptical arch bridge.

== Houses ==
Numbers 1 to 23 are on the south side and numbers 35 onwards on the north side.

=== South side ===
Number 1 (Bathwick Lodge) is a 2-storey villa with a steep Mansard room, built in 1825, extended in 1840 and the late C19. Probably by John Pinch the Elder. Number 2 is from the early 19th century and has shutters over the windows. Number 3 includes a porch which is elaborately enriched with carving, Neo-Grecian gate posts and wrought iron gates. Number 4 has a parapet which sweeps up to central balustrade with a rococo flourish, as does number 5 which is also known as Cornwall Lodge. Number 6, which is also known as Willow House, includes a wrought iron verandah on the 1st floor. Number 7 has a shallow hipped roof. Number 8 has also been known as Upsala Villa and later as Mendip Lodge. The road elevation of number 9, built in 1820, extended in 1870, presents half an octagon in plan with overhanging eaves.

Number 10 is a 2-storey Neo-Grecian villa built in the early 19th century by Thomas Baldwin. The central projection has a curved portico with 4 fluted Ionic columns and Ionic pilasters which go through 2 floors. It is a Grade II* listed building.

Numbers 11, 12 and 13 form a block of attached villas. Number 14 is also from the early 19th century. Number 15, which is also known as The White Loge, is of a similar vintage and includes a 2-storey porch with Doric columns, as does number 17. Number 18 is from the late 18th or early 19th century and includes a wrought iron veranda, and number 19, which is also known as Woodland House, has a balustraded parapet. Numbers 20 and 21 form a block. Number 22 has a rusticated ground floor and quoins.

Number 23 was built in 1817 by William Smith of Walcot, for J Barnard. It is a 3-storey building with a mansard roof.

Claverton Lodge was built around 1825 and later enlarged and altered in classical style when a columned loggia porch with a conical roof was added.

Combe Royal was built in Jacobethan style between 1815 and 1820. The lodge is in a similar style.

=== North side ===
Number 35 is a 3-storey building with a portico of 4 Doric columns, while numbers 36 and 37 form a block of two semi-detached houses. Number 38, which is also known as Bayfield House, has a portico with Doric columns, while numbers 39 and 40 form a block of two semi-detached houses similar to numbers 36 and 37.

Ardenlee is thought to be an early 19th-century recasing of an earlier building.

Woodland Place is a Regency terrace of six houses, designed in about 1826 by Henry Goodridge. The large Italianate villa, Bathwick Grange, which was formerly known as Montebello, was built by Goodridge as his own house, and includes a lodge. He is also thought to have built Bathwick Hill House next door. Fiesole is another Italianate house probably by Goodridge which later became a Youth Hostel.

Oakwood, which was formerly known as Smallcombe Grove, which is also in the style of Goodridge was built for local painter Benjamin Barker. It has an ornamental garden, bridge and pool with fountain.

Casa Bianca and La Casetta also have an Italianate style and include Tuscan columns. Miles House followed in a similar style around 1840 to 1850.

Uplands dates from around 1840, and Upton House has been dated to the early 19th century.

== See also ==
- Grade II* listed buildings in Bath and North East Somerset
- Bathwick
