= All Saints' Church, Weston, Somerset =

Church in Weston, Somerset, England

Coordinates: 51°23′44″N 2°23′18″W

All Saints
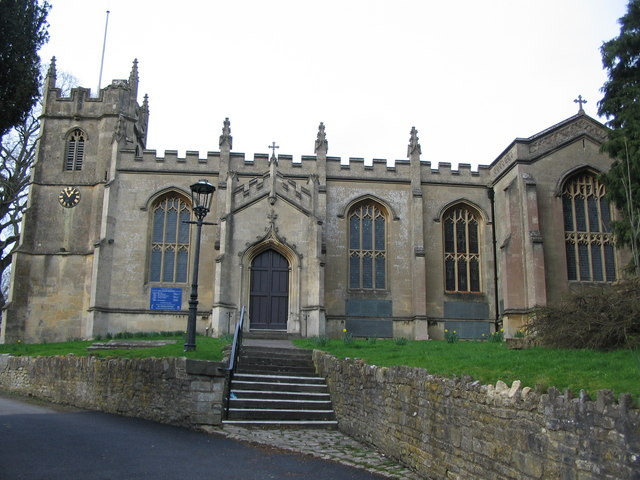
- Interactive map of the All Saints area

General information
- Architectural style: Victorian
- Location: Weston, Bath, England
- Construction started: 15th century
- Completed: 1832

Design and construction
- Architect: John Pinch the Elder

All Saints' Church is a Church of England parish church which stands on a hill at the centre of Weston, a small village on the outskirts of Bath, England. The current Gothic church was designed by architect John Pinch the Elder and completed in 1832, although it retains the 15th-century tower of its predecessor, All Hallows Church.

== Churchyard ==
There are over 90 tablets in the churchyard and more within the church, with some going back to the 12th century. The church kept excellent records which indicated that most of those buried here had no connection with the town but chose the spot for their final repose because it was an idyllically isolated community, away from the smog and congestion of Bath. This popularity lasted for over 200 years.

== Medieval church ==
An early church is mentioned by Pope Adrian IV in an 1156 Bull. Jordanus, the first vicar, arrived at Weston in 1297. In the 15th century, All Hallows Church was built but was demolished in 1830 to create a larger space for a growing community, with only its tower surviving.

The church bells were recast by Thomas Bilbie of the Bilbie family at Chew Stoke in 1739, and were repaired and retuned between 1952 and 1953. Today the tower has six bells from 1739 and two from 1952.

== Victorian church ==
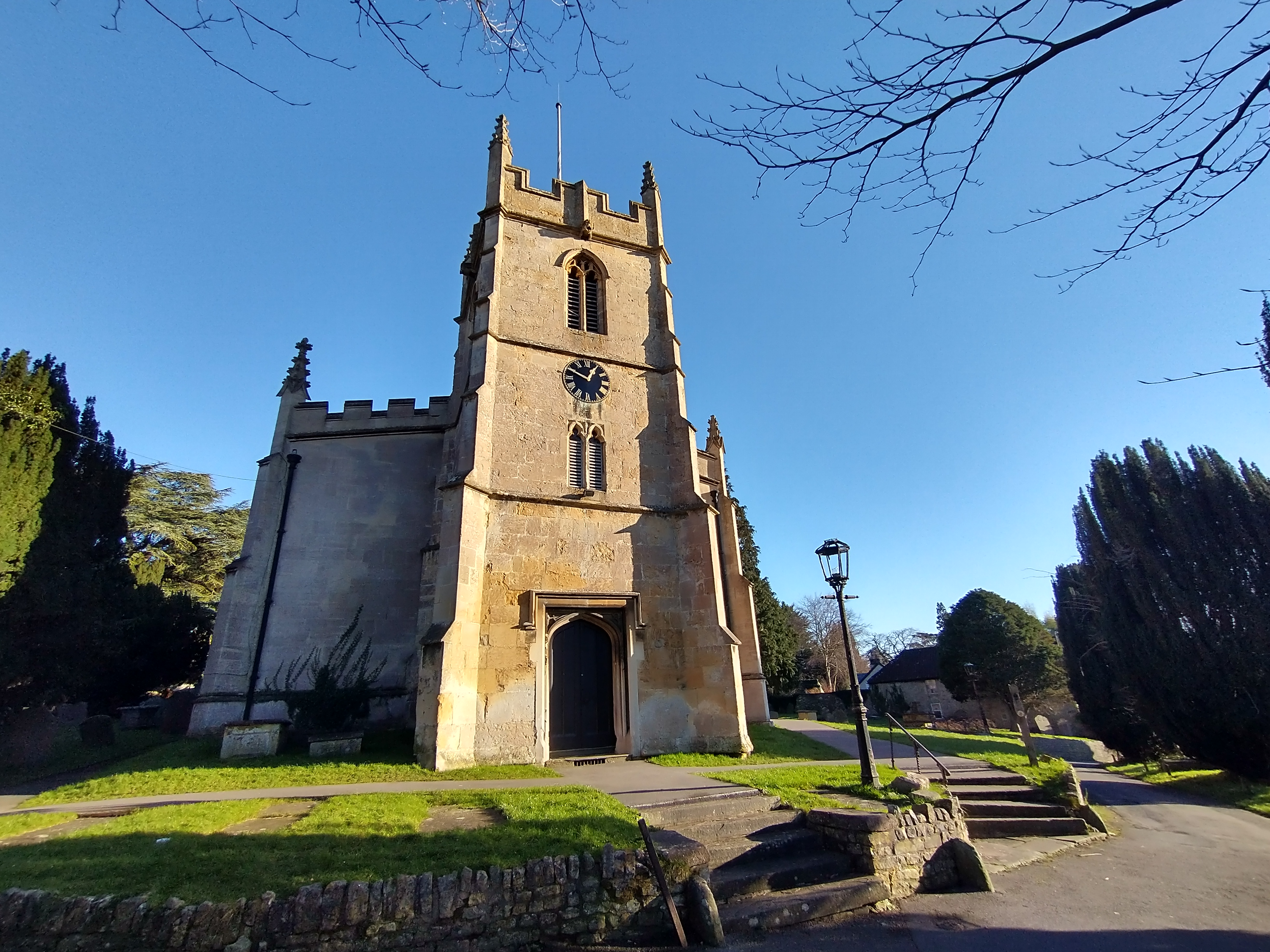
The tower of the church

The new church of All Saints was consecrated on 2 June 1832. It shares some similarities with Pinch's other works at St. Mary the Virgin, Bathwick and St. Saviour, Larkhall, although both of those examples were new-builds and are defined by tall western towers, whereas All Saints is more diminished. New seating with new transepts and a chancel were added between 1880 and 1893, and new clergy and choir vestries were added in 1909. The church furnishings and internal program have been remodelled several times since then and recently a restoration was undertaken of the tower. Near the tower door is a 19th-century font, and on the West Gallery are displayed William and Mary's royal coat of arms.

The church was designated as Grade II listed in 1955.

== Notable features ==
On the south aisle is the St Alphege window, which "commemorates the famous saint whom tradition says was born in Weston (St Alphege became the Abbot of Bath Abbey and then Archbishop of Canterbury). Also depicted is Guthram, King of the Danes, submitting to King Alfred and accepting Christianity." In the south transept, there is a "monument to Alderman Sherston dated 1641; he was Mayor of Bath in 1632. In a niche in the north wall of the chancel is found the oldest monument in the church from the 12-13th century. This is a stone coffin lid that was found under the south porch during the rebuilding of the church in 1830." Other monuments include one of 1699 honoring John Harrington of Kelston, and a monument to "Dr William Oliver (of biscuit fame) whose family owned Weston Manor for many years."

== Pevsner description of the church ==
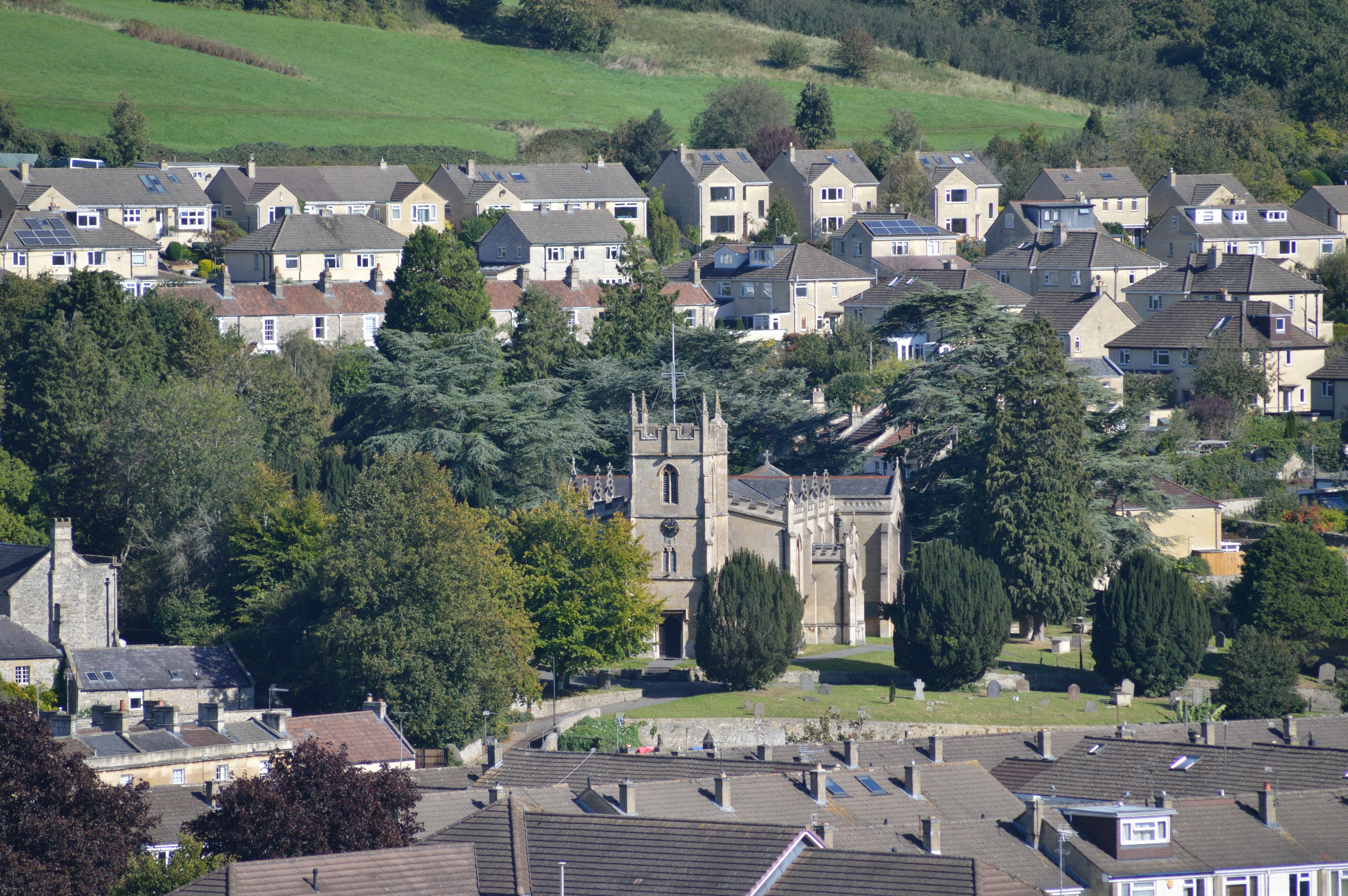
The church and surrounding housing, from Penn Hill

"Other than the simple C15 Perp[endicular] w[est] tower, the church was rebuilt in 1830-2 by John Pinch the Younger. E Harbottle of Exeter added the chancel and transepts in 1893, and Mowbray A. Green a memorial chapel in 1921. Nave and aisles. Tall lancet-like three-light windows with four-centred arches and Perp tracery. Battlements and pinnacles. Arcade of tall piers of Perp section carrying four-centred arches. The nave is broad and low with a rear gallery ..." [Forsyth, 295] "Plate: Chalice and Cover 1572; Apostle Spoon 1614; Chalice and Paten 1692; Flagon 1739." [Pevsner, 334]

== See also ==
- List of ecclesiastical parishes in the Diocese of Bath and Wells
