= Church of St Swithin, Bath =

Church in Somerset, England

Church of St Swithin
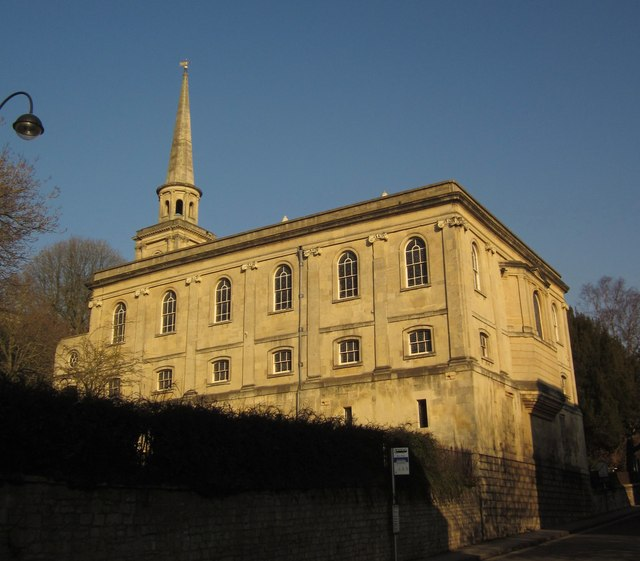

- Location within Somerset
- 51°23′19″N 2°21′34″W
- Location: Bath, England

History
- Built: 1779–1790

Listed Building – Grade II*
- Designated: 12 June 1950
- Reference no.: 1394245

The Anglican Church of St Swithin on The Paragon in the Walcot area of Bath, England, was built between 1777 and 1790. It is a Grade II* listed building.

The church stands on the site of a previous place of worship dating back to the 10th century, the remains of which are beneath the crypt. The dedication is to Swithun, an Anglo-Saxon Bishop of Winchester and subsequently patron saint of Winchester Cathedral. Jane Austen's parents were married at the old St Swithin's church on 26 April 1764 and her father George Austen is buried there.

The current building was erected by John Palmer between 1777 and 1790. His new church opened in 1777 but was soon too small for its growing congregation, as the city became increasingly popular and expanded well beyond its traditional boundaries. St Swithin's spire was added to its square tower by Thomas Bonner in 1848.

On 30 May 1797 the abolitionist William Wilberforce and Barbara Spooner Wilberforce were married in the church. In 1805 it was the burial place of the writer and poet Christopher Anstey and, in 1831, of Rear Admiral Sir Edward Berry. In 1840 it was the burial place of the writer Frances Burney; her husband, General Alexandre D'Arblay was buried there in 1818. The church house, number 38, The Paragon, was built in the early 18th century. A depiction of the Ascension of Jesus in stained glass was added to the east wall in the 1840s. The adjoining cemetery has gates with a rusticated base and panels with inverted torches between pilasters. There is an entablature with metopes and triglyphs.

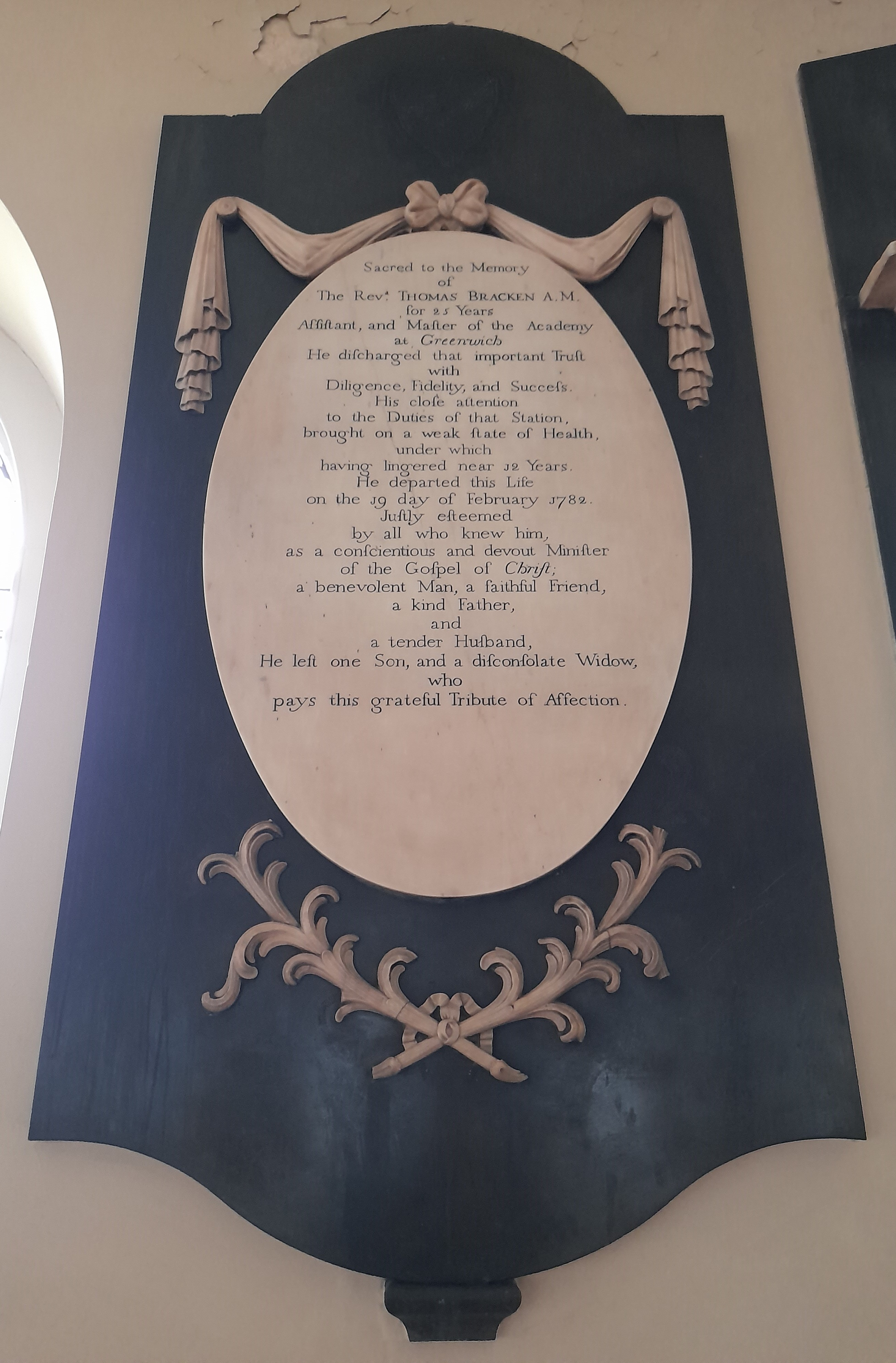
Rev. Thomas Bracken memorial, upper gallery, right hand side.

St Swithin's church houses a number of memorial plaques including Rev. Thomas Bracken, died 19 February 1782, twenty five years Assistant & Master of the Academy at Greenwich, London.

== See also ==
- List of ecclesiastical parishes in the Diocese of Bath and Wells
