= Church of St Peter, Freshford =

Church in Somerset, England

Church of St Peter
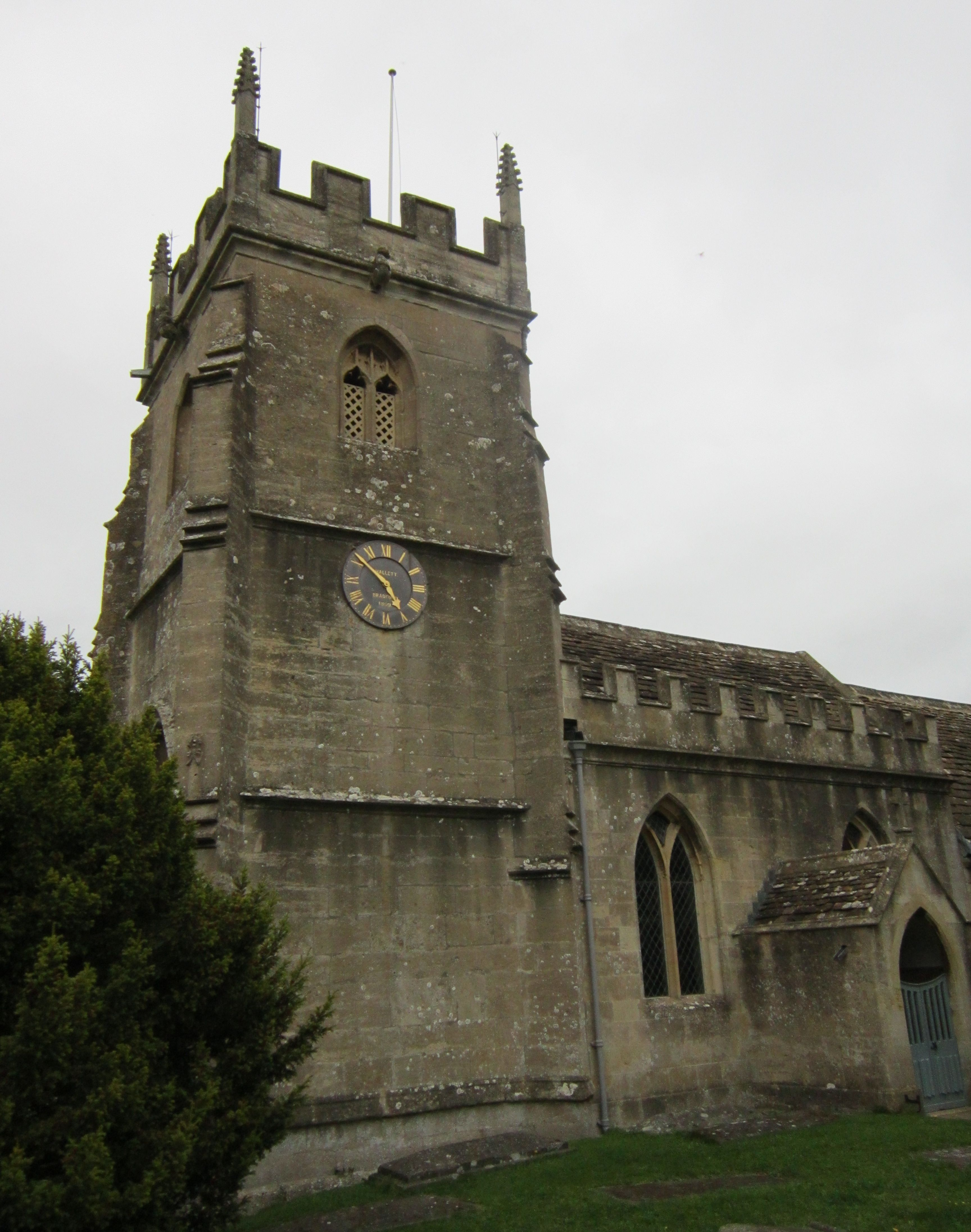

- Location within Somerset
- 51°20′24″N 2°18′12″W
- Location: Freshford, Somerset, England

History
- Built: 15th century

Listed Building – Grade II*
- Designated: 21 September 1960
- Reference no.: 1115302

The Anglican Church of St Peter in Freshford within the English county of Somerset dates from the 15th century. It is a Grade II* listed building.

Parts of St Peter's Church, which is on the north side of the village, date back to the fifteenth century. The three stage tower, which is supported by diagonal buttresses, was added in 1514. The church underwent Victorian restoration by Charles Edward Davis.

The churchyard has a number of Georgian chest tombs, dating from the late 18th and early 19th century, four of which are listed in their own right.

The parish is part of the benefice of Freshford with Limpley Stoke and Hinton Charterhouse within the Diocese of Bath and Wells.

== See also ==
- List of ecclesiastical parishes in the Diocese of Bath and Wells
