= Church of All Saints, Farmborough =

Church in Somerset, England

Church of All Saints
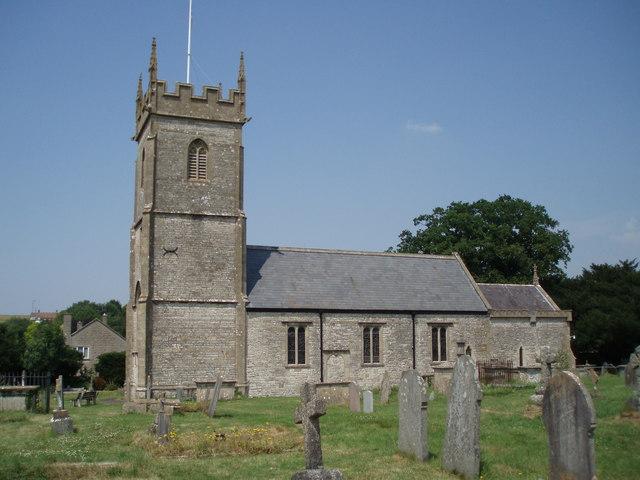

- Location within Somerset
- 51°20′35″N 2°29′16″W
- Location: Farmborough, Somerset, England

History
- Built: 15th century

Listed Building – Grade II*
- Designated: 21 September 1960
- Reference no.: 1136439

The Church of All Saints is an Anglican parish church in Farmborough, Somerset, England. It was principally built in the 15th century (with parts dating to the 14th century) and has been designated as a Grade II* listed building.

The church has a nave, chancel, north aisle and porch. The 3 stage west tower survives from the 15th century however the rest of the fabric of the building is more recent, with Victorian restoration including a new nave in 1869 undertaken by John Elkington Gill. The stained glass, which dates from 1838, was brought to Farmborough from Christ Church in Brighton when it was demolished in 1982. It was inspired by the glass at New College, Oxford designed by the 18th-century portraitist Sir Joshua Reynolds.

In the 15th century John Stafford who later became the Archbishop of Canterbury was the rector of Farmborough.

The parish is part of the benefice of Farmborough with Marksbury and Stanton Prior, Clutton with Cameley, and within the archdeaconry of Bath.

== See also ==
- List of ecclesiastical parishes in the Diocese of Bath and Wells
