= The Priory, Midsomer Norton =

Building in Midsomer Norton, Somerset, England

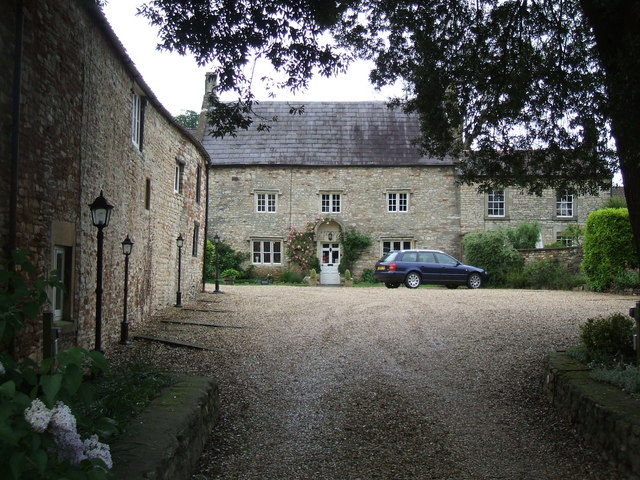

- Location within Somerset
- 51°17′12″N 2°29′08″W
- Location: Midsomer Norton, Somerset, England

History
- Built: Early-mid 17th century

Listed Building – Grade II*
- Designated: 19 May 1950
- Reference no.: 1115160

The Priory in Church Square, Midsomer Norton, within the English county of Somerset was rebuilt in the early or mid 17th century. It is a Grade II* listed building.

The present structure incorporates parts of an earlier building which may date back to 1170.

It is a two-storey stone building with slate roofs and incorporate paneling from the nearby Church of St John the Baptist. The front of the building was probably added in 1712 to an earlier timber-framed structure.

The building was owned, from the Dissolution of the Monasteries in 1538, by Christ Church, Oxford who sold it in 1712. Part of the building was formerly a schoolroom, known as Norton Villa School which operated from 1872 to 1929.

The Michelin starred Moody Goose restaurant used the building, having previously been at the Old Priory Hotel in Bath. It is now used as a hen party venue and bed and breakfast.
