= Church of St Augustine, Clutton =

Church in Somerset, England

Church of St Augustine
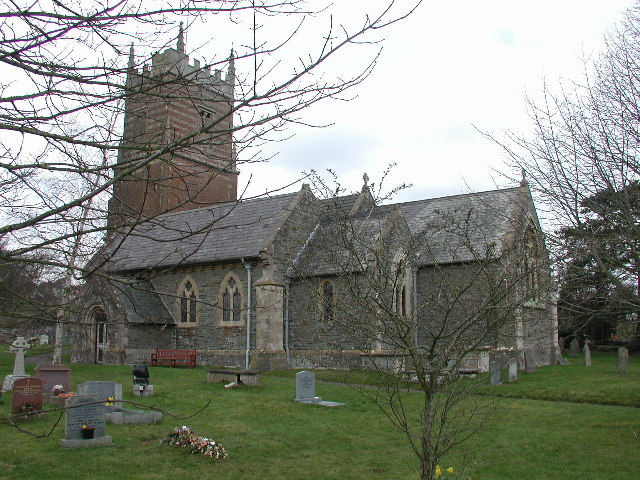

- Location within Somerset
- 51°19′41″N 2°32′35″W
- Location: Clutton Somerset, England

History
- Built: c. 1290

Listed Building – Grade II*
- Designated: 21 September 1960
- Reference no.: 1320766

The Church of St Augustine is an Anglican parish church in Clutton Somerset, England. It was originally built around 1290, but much of it has been rebuilt since, and has been designated as a Grade II* listed building. The church is dedicated to St Augustine of Hippo.

The tower is made of red sandstone with diagonal buttresses ending in pinnacles and probably dates from 1726. The tower contains two bells dating from 1734, made by Thomas Bilbie of the Bilbie family.

Two railed tomb enclosures within the Broadribb family plot are also listed as Grade II, as are a group of three Broadribb and Purnell monuments.

In 1780 John Wesley came to the church but was denied use of the pulpit, so he had to preach from a stone in the churchyard.

The parish is part of the benefice of Farmborough with Marksbury and Stanton Prior, Clutton with Cameley, and within the archdeaconry of Bath.

== See also ==
- List of ecclesiastical parishes in the Diocese of Bath and Wells
