= Church of the Holy Ghost, Midsomer Norton =

Church in Somerset, England

Church of the Holy Ghost
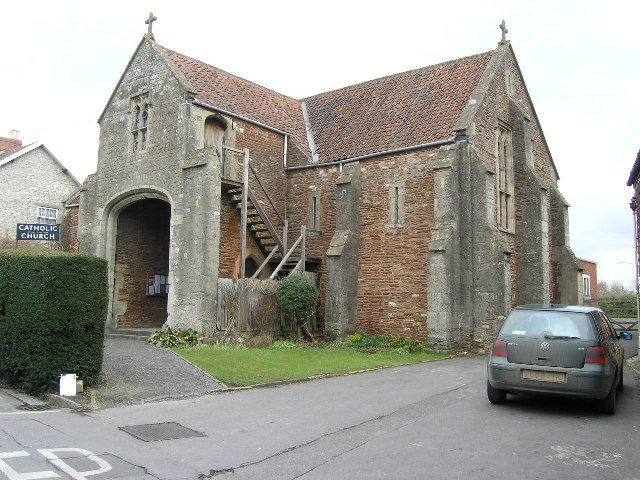
- Church of the Holy Ghost, Midsomer Norton

- Location within Somerset Location within England
- 51.286111°N 2.483889°W
- Location: Midsomer Norton, Somerset
- Country: England
- Denomination: Catholic Church

History
- Dedication: Holy Ghost
- Consecrated: 17 May 1913

Architecture
- Years built: 15th century

Administration
- Province: Ecclesiastical province of Birmingham
- Metropolis: Archdiocese of Birmingham
- Diocese: Diocese of Clifton
- Deanery: Blessed Richard Whiting

Listed Building – Grade II*
- Official name: Church of the Holy Ghost
- Designated: 18 May 1950
- Reference no.: 1115202

The Church of the Holy Ghost, Midsomer Norton, Somerset, England is a Roman Catholic parish church housed in a converted tithe barn. It is served by monks of the Order of St. Benedict from The Community of St Gregory the Great and is a Grade II* listed building.

== History of the building ==
The building was formerly a tithe barn built and owned by the Augustinian Canons at Merton Priory, Surrey. It is the second-oldest existing building in Midsomer Norton (after the old priory itself), with Pevsner assigning it to the 15th century.

Following the Dissolution of the Monasteries under Henry VIII, the barn was handed over to the King along with all of the Priory's property, and subsequently became part of the patrimony of Christ Church, Oxford. By 1886 it was no longer needed for the storing of tithes in kind and was sold to a private owner in auction.

== Conversion to church use ==
In 1906 the building was purchased by Downside Abbey for use as a church. Since its auction in 1886 the barn had been used as a kennels, a stable and even a chicken house and was by now in a very poor state. Abbot Edmund Ford engaged the services of the architect Giles Gilbert Scott to plan restoration and conversion of the building. In addition to restoring the splendid timber roof and timbers, Scott made several structural changes to the building, including new doorways and a new gothic style window in the south wall, the tracery for which was copied from that of a room above the porch.

The barn was consecrated as a church on 17 May 1913.

== Church furnishings ==
The tabernacle of the church is elaborately carved in wood and richly gilded. It dates from 1794, and previously stood on the High Altar of the Chapel of the Bavarian Embassy, Golden Square, London. The Stations of the Cross are Flemish and are early examples of the painted depiction of the stations, dating from the end of the 18th century.

Other church furnishings, including the Jacobean panelling behind the High Altar (now carrying the words "Deus Caritas Est", or God is Love), were taken from the buildings of Downside Abbey and School. The pulpit used to be the Prefect's desk in the school's study room.

== Times ==
Sunday Mass:
11.00 am

Holy Days:
9.30 am

Weekdays:
Tuesday, Friday, Saturday 9.30 am
Wednesday 6.15 pm

Confessions:
Saturday 10.00 am to 10.45 am

Devotions:
Exposition Wednesday 5.00 pm to 6.00 pm

== Weddings ==
In June 2010 The Holy Ghost was the location of a celebrity wedding when Republic of Ireland international and Fulham footballer Damien Duff married his girlfriend Elaine.
