= Church of St James, Southstoke =

Church in Somerset, England

Church of St James the Great
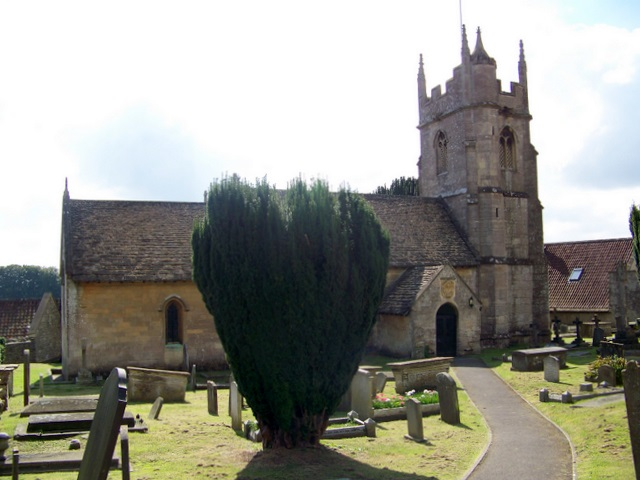

- Location within Somerset
- 51°20′59″N 2°21′55″W
- Location: Southstoke, Somerset, England

Listed Building – Grade II*
- Designated: 1 February 1956
- Reference no.: 1277046

The Church of St James is an Anglican parish church in Southstoke, Somerset, England. It was built in the 12th century and has been designated as a Grade II* listed building.

Dedicated to James, son of Zebedee, known in England as St James the Great, the original 12th-century building was altered in the 15th century. Further restoration was undertaken in the 1840s and 1850s when the chancel and south aisle were rebuilt. However, the north door is Norman. Pevsner says of it

Low Perp. w. tower. Nave with Norman n. doorway. One order of columns, both patterned with a lozenge design, but the r. one in addition with two alternating smaller motifs in the lozenges. Lintel with low-pitched top, chip-carved. Tympanum with a trellis pattern of roll-mouldings. Arch with rosettes, three-dimensional zigzag and a kind of flat plait. S. aisle and chancel 1845 and c. 1850. Pulpit – stone, polygonal, probably Perp.

Pevsner also noted in the 1950s that the church plate included an Elizabethan chalice and a paten by Thomas Parr marked for the year 1700.

The parish is part of the benefice of Combe Down with Monkton Combe and South Stoke within the archdeaconry of Bath.

== See also ==
- List of ecclesiastical parishes in the Diocese of Bath and Wells
