= Church of St Mary The Virgin, Timsbury =

Church in Somerset, England

Church of St Mary The Virgin
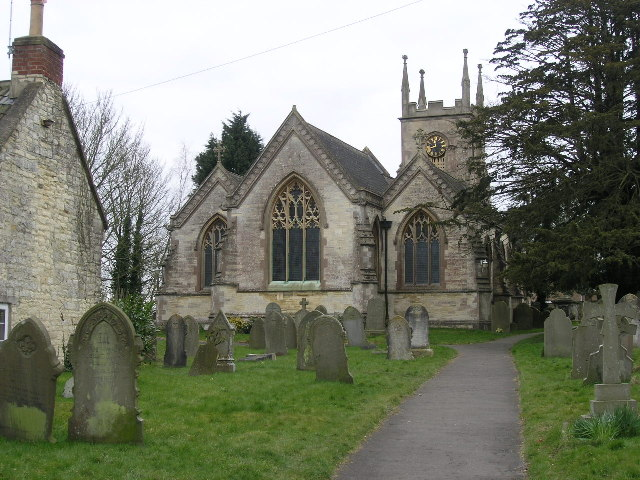

- Location within Somerset
- 51°19′32″N 2°28′44″W
- Location: Timsbury, Somerset, England

History
- Built: 1826-1832

Listed Building – Grade II*
- Designated: 21 September 1960
- Reference no.: 1129594

The Anglican Church of St Mary The Virgin in Timsbury within the English county of Somerset is a Grade II* listed building.

An old church on the site had fallen into disrepair by the 1820s. The church was rebuilt in 1826–32 and the east end added in 1852 by Sir George Gilbert Scott.

In the churchyard are monuments to James Collins, Robert Langford, the Parsons family, two Smith monuments and one unidentified.

The rectory dates from around 1820.

The parish is part of the benefice of Timsbury with Priston, Camerton and Dunkerton within the Diocese of Bath and Wells.

== See also ==
- List of ecclesiastical parishes in the Diocese of Bath and Wells
