= Church of St Michael and All Angels, Twerton =

Church in Somerset, England

Church of St Michael and All Angels
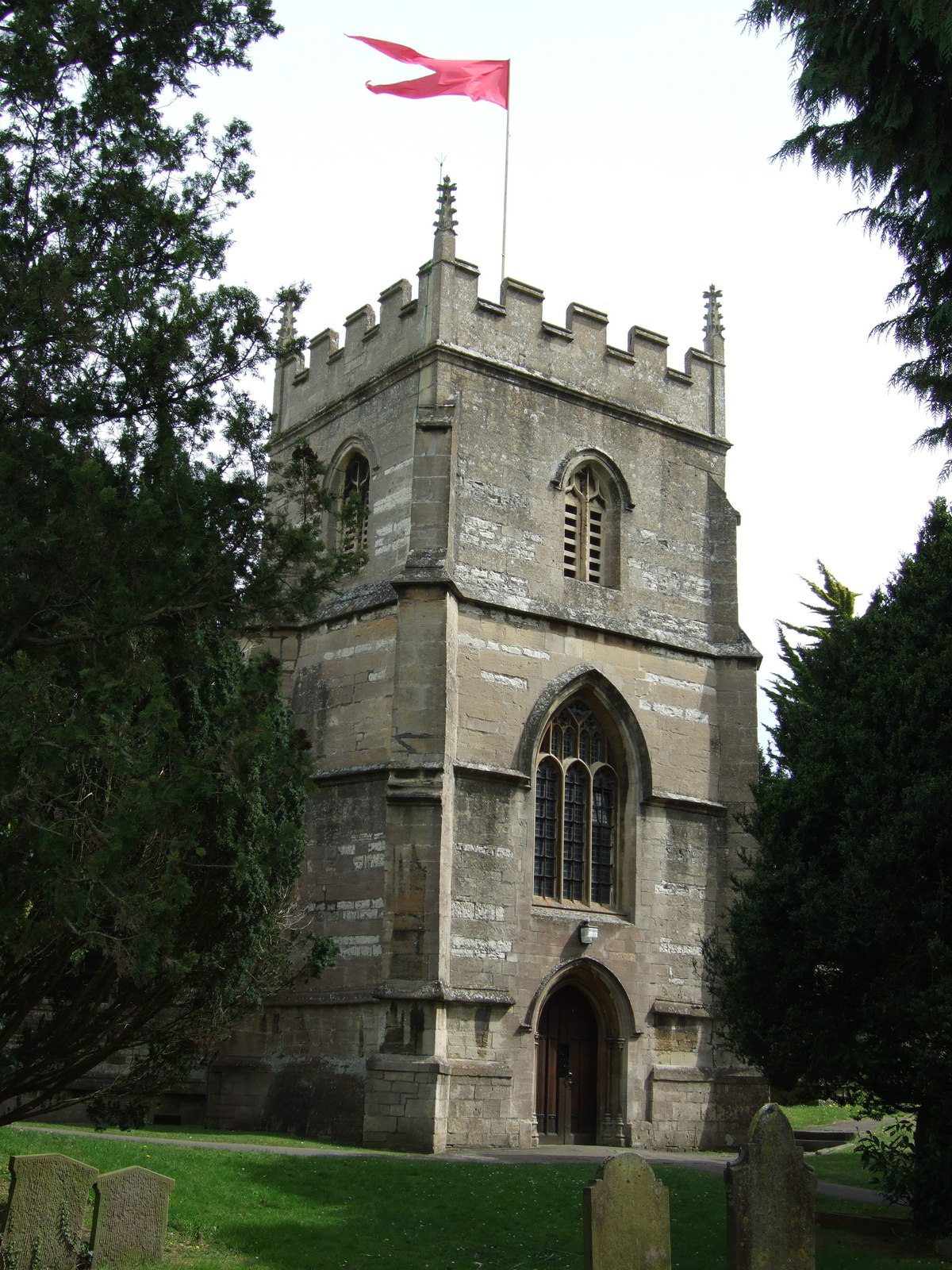

- Location within Somerset
- 51.3809°N 2.3981°W
- Location: How Hill, Twerton, Bath, Somerset, England

History
- Built: 15th century

Listed Building – Grade II*
- Official name: Church of St Michael and All Angels
- Designated: 12 June 1950
- Reference no.: 1395896

The Church of St Michael and All Angels on How Hill in Twerton, Bath, Somerset, England was built in the 15th century. It is a Grade II* listed building.

== History ==
The tower of the church remains from the 15th century. The rest of the building was rebuilt in 1839 by George Phillips Manners, incorporating some of the fabric from the earlier structure. Further Victorian restoration was carried out by E.W. Buckle, after which it was reconsecrated on 21 January 1886.

The parish is part of the Bath Marlbrook Team benefice within the Diocese of Bath and Wells. It serves the community of Twerton and provides a community centre and cafe, recording studio and a range of community projects.

== Architecture ==
The limestone building has slate and lead roofs. It consists of a nave, chancel with attached vestry and north and south aisles. The three-stage west tower is supported by diagonal buttresses.

The south door is all that remains from the original Norman structure which stood there c. 1100.

== See also ==
- List of ecclesiastical parishes in the Diocese of Bath and Wells
