= Church of All Saints, Dunkerton =

Church in Somerset, England

Church of All Saints
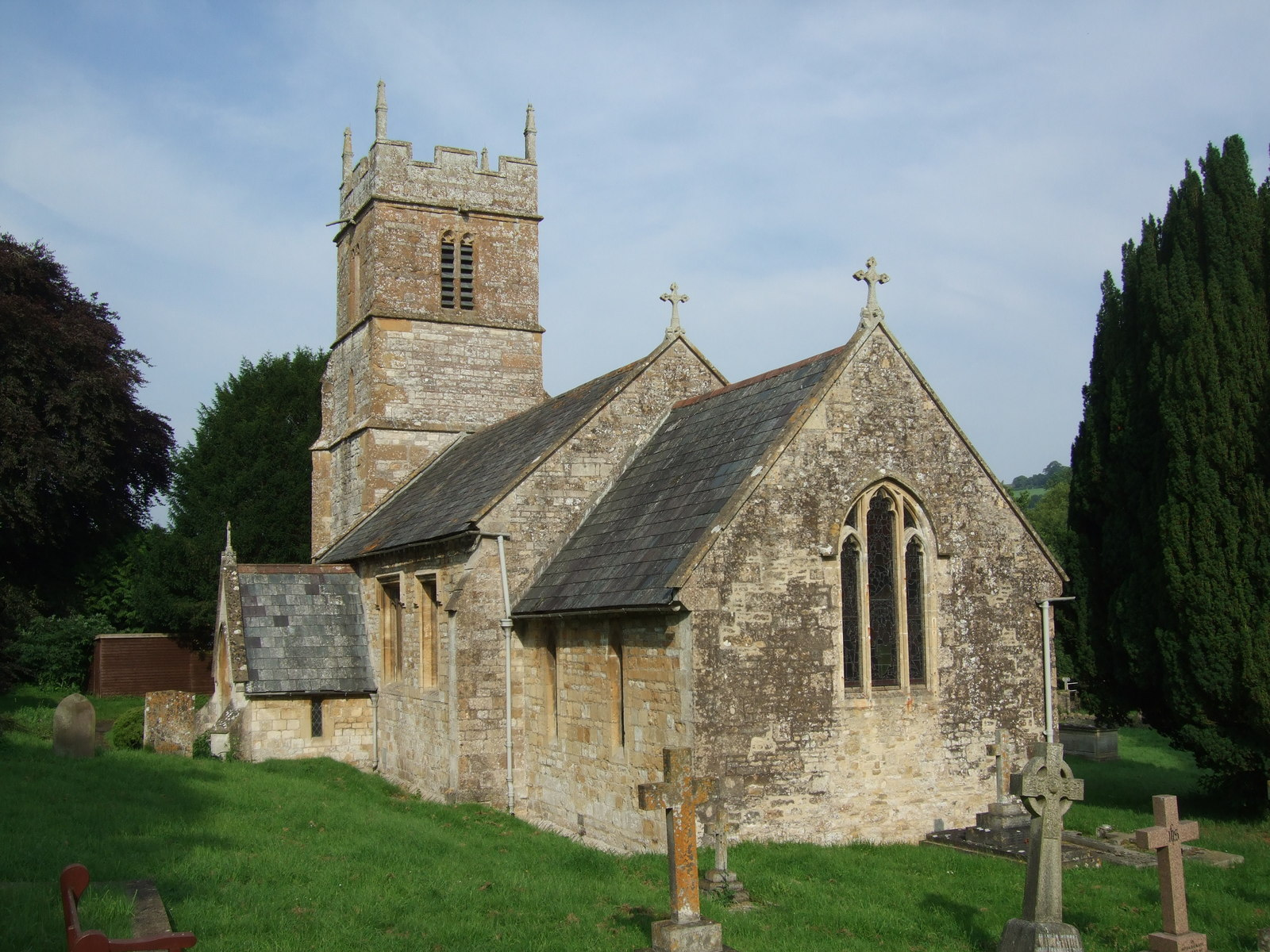

- Location within Somerset
- 51°19′55″N 2°24′57″W
- Location: Dunkerton Somerset, England

History
- Built: 14th century

Listed Building – Grade II*
- Designated: 1 February 1956
- Reference no.: 1135797

The Church of All Saints is an Anglican parish church in Dunkerton Somerset, England. It was built in the 14th century with the tower being added in the 15th and has been designated as a Grade II* listed building.

The church consists of a nave, chancel and west porch. The three-stage tower is supported by diagonal buttresses and has a stair turret in the north east corner. The stained glass includes work by Clayton and Bell.

In the churchyard is a large yew tree close to the boundary wall.

The parish is part of the benefice of Timsbury with Priston, Camerton and Dunkerton within the archdeaconry of Midsomer Norton.

== See also ==
- List of ecclesiastical parishes in the Diocese of Bath and Wells
