= St Saviour's Church, Bath =

St Saviour's Church
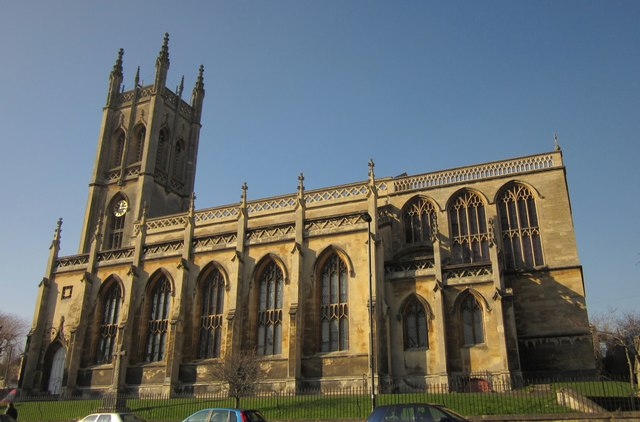
- St Saviour's Church
- 51.3958°N 2.3465°W
- Country: England
- Denomination: Anglican
- Website: stsaviours.org.uk

History
- Founder: Charles Moysey
- Consecrated: April 1832

Architecture
- Heritage designation: Grade II* Listed
- Designated: 12 June 1950
- Architectural type: Church
- Style: Gothic Revival
- Groundbreaking: 1829
- Completed: 1832
- Construction cost: £10,600

Administration
- Province: Canterbury
- Diocese: Bath and Wells
- Deanery: Bath

St Saviour's Church is a Church of England parish church in Larkhall, Bath, Somerset, England.

The church was founded by Archdeacon Charles Moysey in 1824 following the Church Building Act 1824. St Saviour's is one of three Commissioners' churches in Bath and one of six hundred nationally.

The church was constructed between 1829 and 1832, probably by architect John Pinch the younger based on a design by his father, John Pinch the elder. The church was enlarged in 1882 when a chancel was added by architect C. E. Davis. When the building was designated as Grade II* listed in 1950, it was described as "a Gothic Revival church reflecting both Decorated and Perpendicular architectural detailing".

The church's crypt was opened in 1832. In October 1832, Rear-Admiral Volant Vashon Ballard was the first person to be interred in the crypt. More than 200 people were buried at the church before the burial grounds were closed in 1891. Subsequent burials took place in Locksbrook Cemetery until 1937.
