= The Court, Stanton Drew =

House in Stanton Drew, Somerset, England

The Court
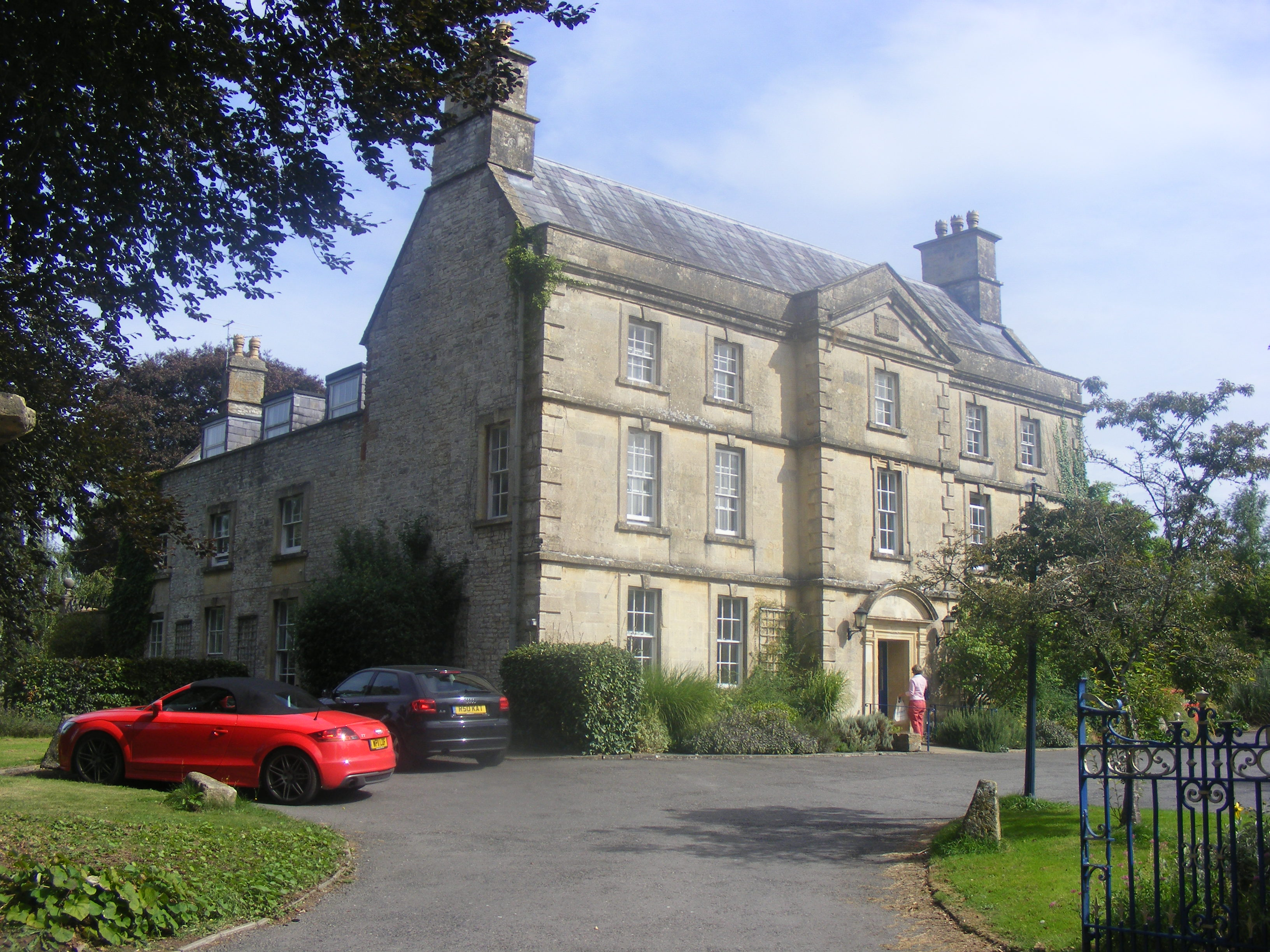

- Location within Somerset
- 51.36741°N 2.57894°W
- Location: Stanton Drew, Somerset, England

History
- Built: 1753

Listed Building – Grade II*
- Official name: The Court
- Designated: 21 September 1960
- Reference no.: 1136188

Listed Building – Grade II
- Official name: Wall, piers and gates about 16 metres west of The Court
- Designated: 4 December 1986
- Reference no.: 1129644

The Court in Stanton Drew, Somerset, England dates from 1753 and is a Grade II* listed building. It is now used as a nursing home. The walls and piers around this property are themselves Grade II listed. It is now used as a nursing home.

== History ==
The house was built in 1753 and incorporated some features from a previous building. It underwent significant remodelling in the 19th century.

== Architecture ==
The limestone front of the three-storey building has five bays. The central doorway has doric pilasters supporting a segmental pediment.

The 2 acres (0.81 ha) of grounds include mature trees and herbaceaous borders. There is also a vegetable garden and fruit trees. It is opened for the National Gardens Scheme.

== Nursing Home ==
The building has been converted into a nursing home. It was inspected by the Care Quality Commission in November 2015 and rated as requiring improvement. In 2018 the CQC rated the home as good.
