= Church of St Leonard, Chelwood =

Church in Somerset, England

Church of St Leonard
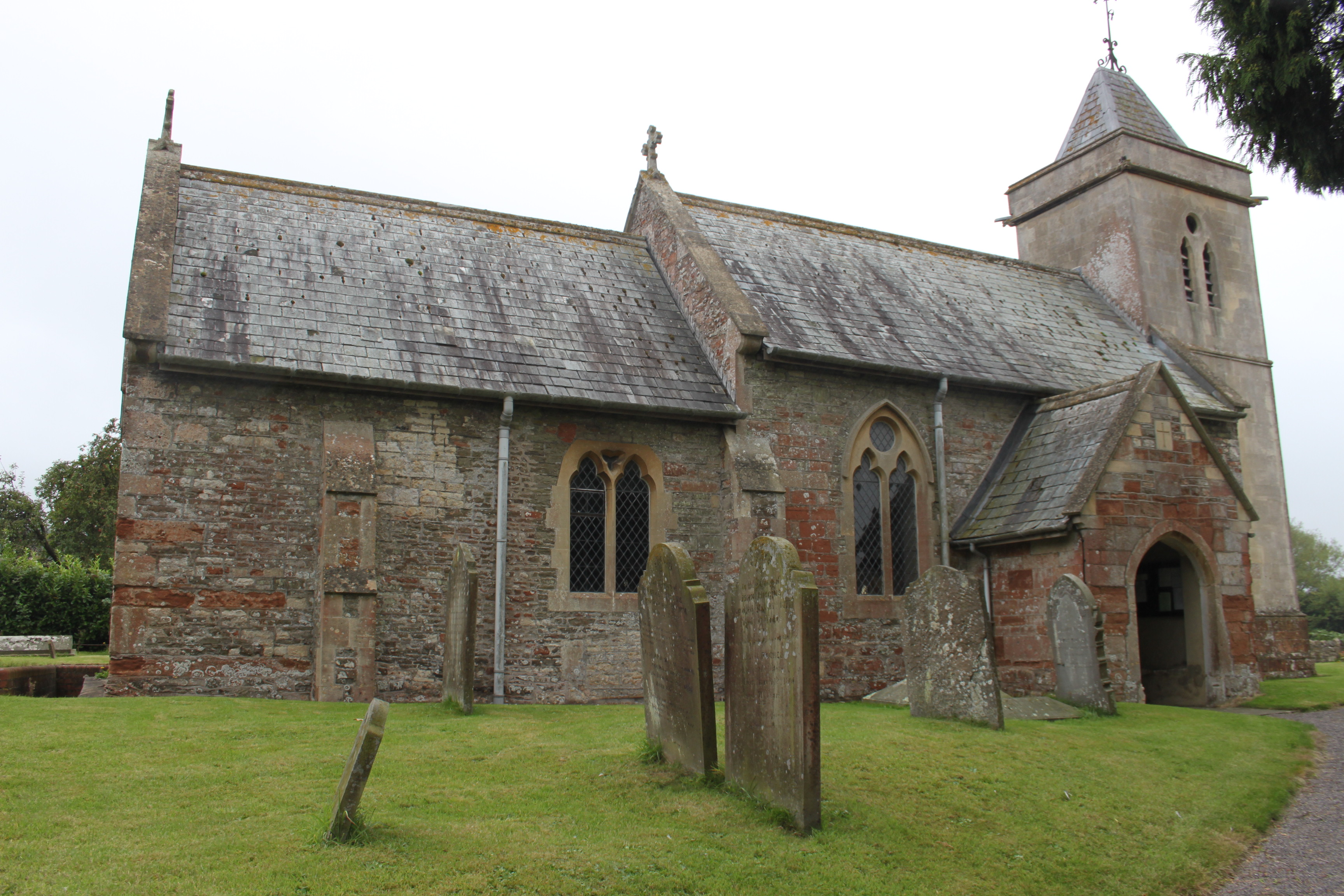

- Location within Somerset
- 51°21′46″N 2°31′38″W
- Location: Chelwood, Somerset, England

Listed Building – Grade II*
- Designated: 21 September 1960
- Reference no.: 1320735

The Church of St. Leonard is a redundant church in Chelwood, Somerset, England. It was built in the 14th century and has been designated as a Grade II* listed building.

The church was largely rebuilt during restoration around 1860.

The font is Norman with tiny volutes at the edges and a top frieze of something like lambrequins. These have been described as the remains of locking staples used to prevent witches stealing the holy water. The stained glass has various 16th-century Flemish bits in the south aisle window.

The two-stage west tower contains a bell dating from 1773 and made by Abraham Bilbie of the Bilbie family.

== See also ==
- List of ecclesiastical parishes in the Diocese of Bath and Wells
