= Old School Room, Chew Magna =

Old School Room
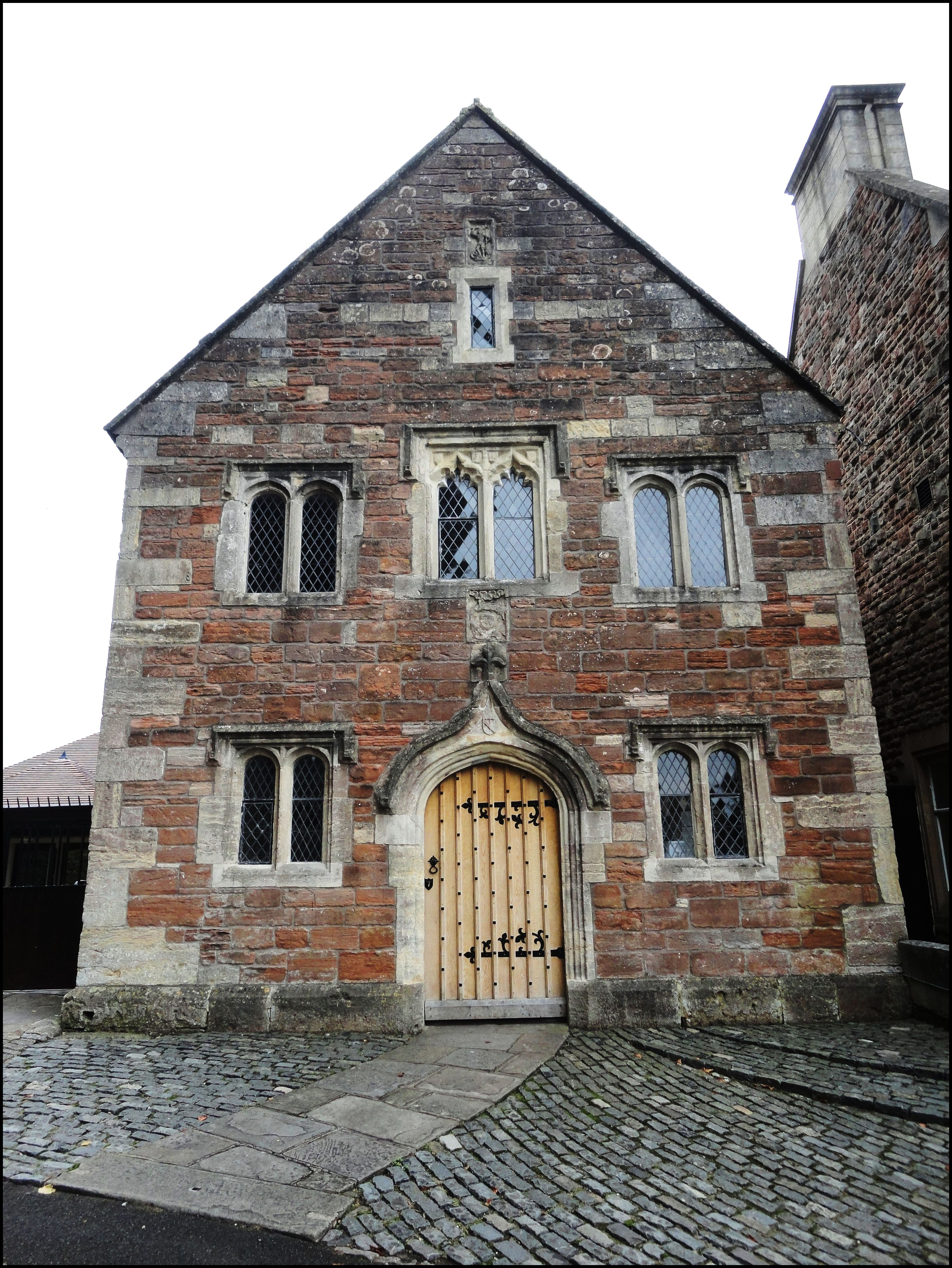
- The Old School Room

- Location within Somerset
- 51°21′58″N 2°36′33″W
- Location: Chew Magna, Somerset, England

History
- Built: c. 1510

Site notes
- Owner: Chew Magna Old School Room Charity

Listed Building – Grade II*
- Designated: 21 September 1960
- Reference no.: 1135935

The Old School Room in Chew Magna, Somerset, England was built around 1510. It is a Grade II* listed building.

It was built as a church house for the neighbouring Church of St Andrew. The upstairs room was the local school from the mid or early 15th century, with the village poorhouse below. The ground floor was divided into cubicles which housed the destitute and occasionally prisoners. It also served as the meeting place of the Court leet.

The building was declared unsafe in 1965. In 1971 the building underwent major renovation, which included replacement of oak beams supporting the upper floor were replaced and preservation work on the wooden roof carried out. The building was then used as a youth club until it was purchased by the parish council in 1981 as a village hall. Since then it has been a venue for social activity in the village.
