= Museum of Bath Architecture =

Museum in Bath, Somerset, England

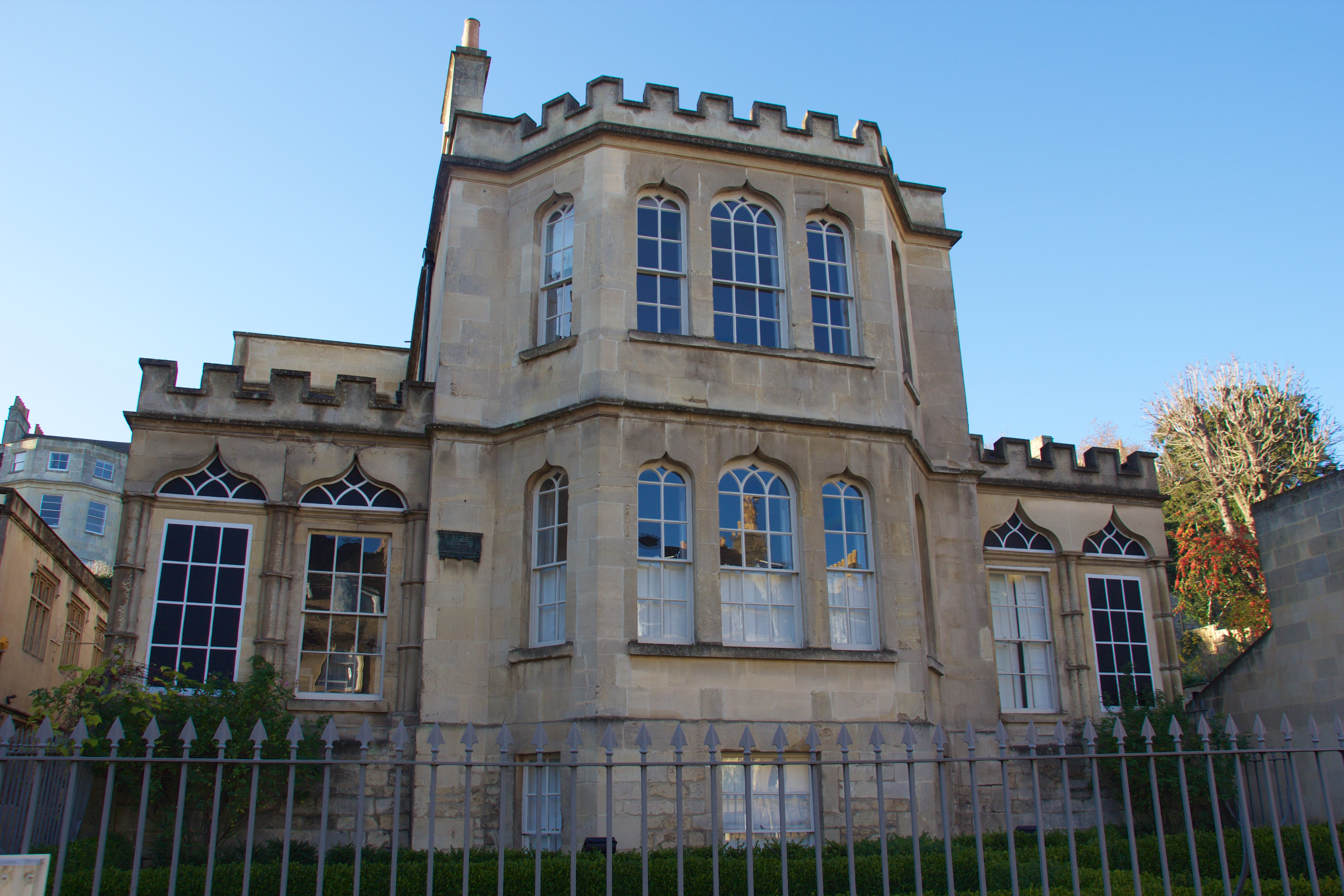

- Location within Somerset and the United Kingdom
- Established: 1984
- Location: The Paragon, Bath
- Coordinates: 51.3868°N 2.3603°W
- Owner: Bath Preservation Trust
- Website: museumofbatharchitecture.org.uk

The Museum of Bath Architecture (formerly known as the Building of Bath Museum and the Building of Bath Collection) in Bath, Somerset, England, occupies the Countess of Huntingdon's Chapel, where it provides exhibits that explain the building of the Georgian era city during the 18th century.

It is owned and managed by the Bath Preservation Trust. The Trust moved its own offices from Number One Royal Crescent to occupy part of the chapel while the Whole Story Project was undertaken to reunite Number One with its original domestic offices. As of 2018 some Trust staff are based at No. 1 Royal Crescent and some are at the Old School House adjacent to the Museum of Bath Architecture.

The museum includes a series of models, maps, paintings and reconstructions to show how a typical Georgian house was constructed, from the ashlar stone to the decorative plasterwork. Sections include displays of stone mining, furniture making, painting, wallpaper, soft furnishings and upholstery. A model of Bath on a 1:500 scale gives a bird's-eye view of the city.

The study gallery specialises in books on architecture including the Bath Buildings Record and Coard Collection.

The collection includes several works whose purchase was supported by the Art Fund. A panoramic view of Bath from Beechen Cliff in 1824 by Charles Joseph Hullmandel shows Bath as a still relatively small city, after its Georgian growth, but before the arrival of the railway and Victorian expansion. A slightly later panorama (1833) by Joseph William Allen (1803–1852) shows Bath from Lyncombe Hill.

== Building ==
The building which houses the collection was built in 1765 as the Trinity Presbyterian Church and is also known as the Countess of Huntingdon's Chapel. It has been designated by English Heritage as a Grade II* listed building.
