= Calamine brass =

Type of brass

Calamine brass is brass produced by a particular alloying technique using the zinc ore calamine directly, rather than first refining it to metallic zinc. Direct zinc smelting appears to have been unknown in Europe until the mid-18th century, even though the alloyed calamine brass was in use for centuries, and metallic zinc was produced directly via reducing-atmosphere smelting in India and China from the 12th century CE onwards.

Brass is an alloy of copper and zinc and, when it was first developed, methods for producing metallic zinc were unknown. Metallurgists wishing to produce brass thus used calamine (actually a mixture of the virtually indistinguishable zinc ores smithsonite and hemimorphite) as the zinc component of brass. The resulting brasses, produced by heating a mixture of copper and calamine to a high temperature for several hours (allowing zinc vapor to distill from the ores and permeate the metallic copper), contained a significant amount of slag material resulting from the non-zinc components of calamine. The use of ore rather than metallic zinc also made it difficult to accurately produce the desired final proportion of copper to zinc. This process is known as cementation.

Calamine brass was produced using proportions of two-sevenths fine copper, four-sevenths calamine, and one-seventh shruff (old plate brass). Calamine brass was the first type of brass produced, probably starting during the 1st millennium BC, and was not replaced in Europe by other brass manufactures until the 18th century. It is likely that Indian brass manufacturers had developed more advanced techniques some centuries earlier.

The area around La Calamine, now Kelmis, in Belgium, was the source of much of the medieval brass of northern Europe. Brass production was introduced to England in 1587 when several members of the Company of Mineral and Battery Works obtained a licence from the company (within whose monopoly it was) to build a brass works at Isleworth. However a decade later the company obstructed the owners from mining calamine. A plaque at Tintern Abbey claims that the well-known brassworks at this site began in 1568. (Note: Near this place in the year 1568 Brass was first made by alloying Copper with Zinc. To commemorate the event and on the occasion of the Diamond Jubilee of the National Brassfoundry Association, this plaque was erected in 1957) (Note: The plaque also claims though that the brass was made with copper and zinc, which is so unlikely at this date as to make the claimed date also slightly suspect.)

New brass works were built by a German immigrant in 1649 at Esher, probably using Swedish copper. After the passing of the Royal Mines Act 1688 (1 Will. & Mar. c. 30), further works were built near Bristol, where brass production became a major industry in the 18th century. Later brass production sites in England included Cheadle and Birmingham.

Calamine brass was slowly phased out as zinc smelting techniques were developed in Europe, which produced metallic zinc more suitable for brass production than calamine. However, the conversion away from calamine brass manufacture was slow; a British patent was awarded to William Champion in 1738, but the alloying of metallic zinc and copper to produce brass was not patented until 1781 (by James Emerson), and calamine brass mills persisted in South Wales until as late as 1858. The slow diffusion of this technology was probably the result of economic factors.
