= Axbridge Town Hall =

Municipal building in Axbridge, Somerset, England

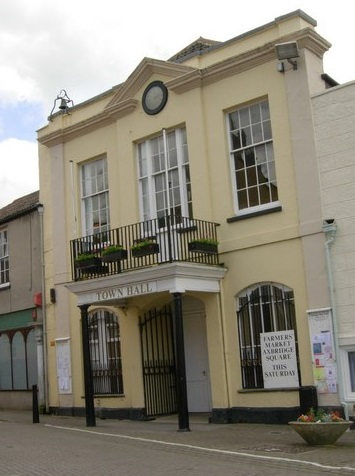
- Axbridge Town Hall

- Shown in Somerset
- 51.2871°N 2.8170°W
- Location: The Square, Axbridge

History
- Built: 1830

Site notes
- Architectural style: Neoclassical style

Listed Building – Grade II
- Official name: Town Hall
- Designated: 9 February 1961
- Reference no.: 1344886

Axbridge Town Hall is a municipal building in The Square in Axbridge, Somerset, England. The building, which is the meeting place of Axbridge Town Council, is a Grade II listed building.

== History ==
The building was commissioned as a guildhall and market hall for the borough of Axbridge. It was designed in the neoclassical style, built in brick with a stucco finish at a cost of £1,800 and was completed in 1830. The design involved a symmetrical main frontage with three bays facing onto The Square; the central bay, which slightly projected forward, featured a segmental opening with wrought iron gates behind a portico with iron columns supporting an entablature, a frieze inscribed with the words "Town Hall" and a balcony. There was a sash window on the first floor. The outer bays contained segmental openings with wrought iron bars on the ground floor and sash windows on the first floor. At roof level, there was a cornice and a parapet broken by a central open pediment containing a clock, and there was a small bell on a wrought iron support, mounted on the parapet on the left hand side. The clock, made by local clockmaker Thomas Williams in the 1790s, predates the rest of the building; it shows the time on two dials (the second being inside the courtroom). The clock was restored in 2012. Internally, the principal rooms were the main hall on the ground floor and the council chamber and the courtroom on the first floor.

A room was fitted out to store securely the borough's extensive collection of manuscripts which had been accumulated over many centuries. An Elizabethan map of the Mendip Hills, showing the location of the lead mines, was hung on one of the walls. In the 19th century, the courtroom was used as the venue for the fortnightly petty session hearings. Following the implementation of the Municipal Corporations Act 1883, the Borough of Axbridge was abolished in 1886 and its assets, including the town hall, were transferred to a new body, the Axbridge Town Trust, in 1889.

Following local government re-organisation in 1974, the town hall became the meeting place of Axbridge Town Council and the courtroom was let out to the Somerset Archaeological and Natural History Society. The building was dressed up to play the role of a branch of NatWest in a television advert for the bank in 1991. A programme of works, involving the installation of sound absorbent ceiling panels to improve the acoustics of the main hall, was carried out with financial support from National Grid's Community Fund and completed in 2020. The improvements allowed higher quality artists to be attracted to the venue and performers lined up included the American rock guitarist, Greg Douglass, in 2022.
