= Axbridge =

Town in Somerset, England

Coordinates: 51.287°N 2.815°W

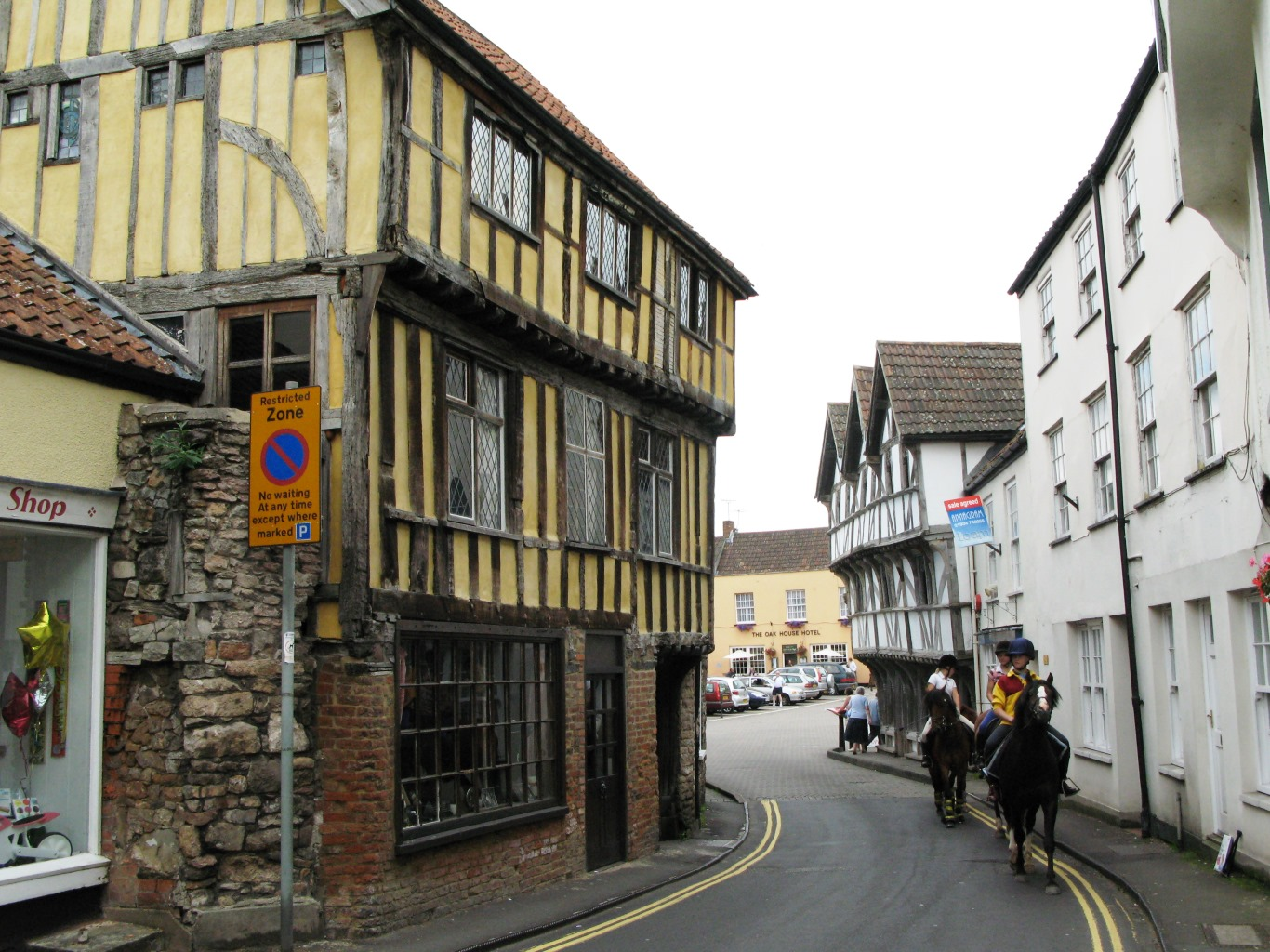
- Axbridge High Street

- Location within Somerset
- Population: 1,997 (Parish, 2021)
- OS grid reference: ST431545
- Civil parish: Axbridge
- Unitary authority: Somerset Council
- Ceremonial county: Somerset
- Region: South West
- Country: England
- Sovereign state: United Kingdom
- Post town: AXBRIDGE
- Postcode district: BS26
- Dialling code: 01934
- Police: Avon and Somerset
- Fire: Devon and Somerset
- Ambulance: South Western
- UK Parliament: Wells and Mendip Hills

Axbridge is a town and civil parish in Somerset, England. It is on the River Axe, near the southern edge of the Mendip Hills. At the 2021 census, the parish had a population of 1,997.

== History ==
Axanbrycg is suggested as the source of the name, meaning a bridge over the River Axe, in the early 9th century.

Early inhabitants of the area almost certainly include the Romans (who are known to have mined lead on the top of the Mendips) and, earlier still, prehistoric man, who lived in the local caves and whose flint tools have been found on the slopes of the local hills. The history of Axbridge can be traced back to the reign of King Alfred, when it was part of the Saxons' defence system for Wessex against the Vikings. In the Burghal Hidage, a list of burhs compiled in 910, it was listed as Axanbrycg. A listing of Axbridge appears in Domesday Book of 1086 as Alse Bruge, meaning 'axe bridge' from Old English isca and brycg.

It was part of the royal manor of Cheddar and part of the Winterstoke Hundred.

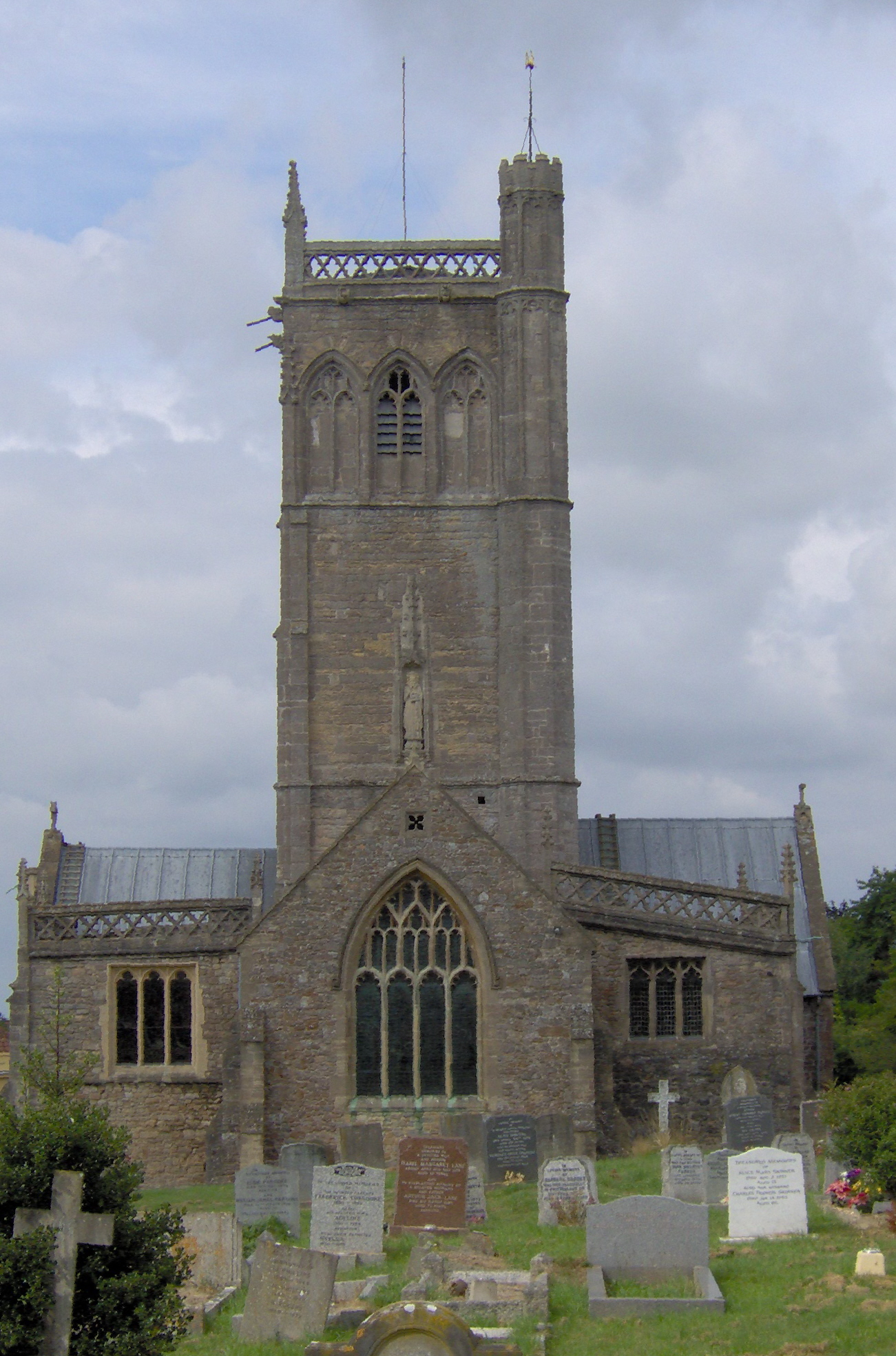
Church of St John the Baptist, Axbridge

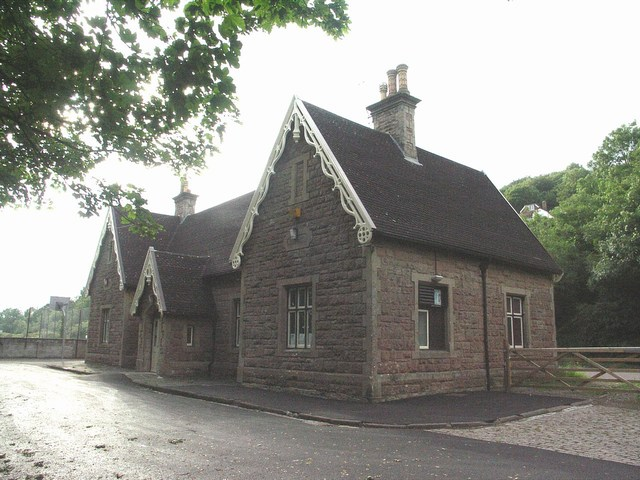
Former Axbridge railway station

It was granted a royal charter in 1202, when King John sold most of the royal manor of Cheddar to the Bishop of Bath and Wells. Axbridge grew in the Tudor period as a centre for cloth manufacture, This was reflected in its early royal charters allowing it to hold markets and fairs, and become a royal borough. It even had its own mint, with coins showing the town's symbol: the Lamb and Flag. Trade was possible as the River Axe was navigable to wharves at Axbridge.

Later the town's importance declined, which led to stagnation and the preservation of many historic buildings in the town centre. These include King John's Hunting Lodge (actually a Tudor building) which is now used as a museum.

During the 19th and early 20th centuries iron ore was extracted from the hill above and east of Axbridge.

Axbridge railway station, on the Cheddar Valley line, opened on 3 August 1869. It closed to goods traffic on 10 June 1963 and to passengers on 9 September 1963. The route of the railway is now the A371 Axbridge bypass, but the station buildings and goods shed still survive.

In April 1973, many residents died in Invicta International Airlines Flight 435, the worst aviation accident in Swiss history, with those from Cheddar and Winscombe.

The Square was used as the setting for a NatWest Bank television advert in the early 1990s, and in particular Axbridge Town Hall doubled as a NatWest branch. Ironically a real branch of NatWest, in the High Street, was closed not long afterwards and the premises are now private residential accommodation. In 2017 several locations in the town were used for a Thatchers Cider television commercial, which featured a hot air balloon.

== Governance ==
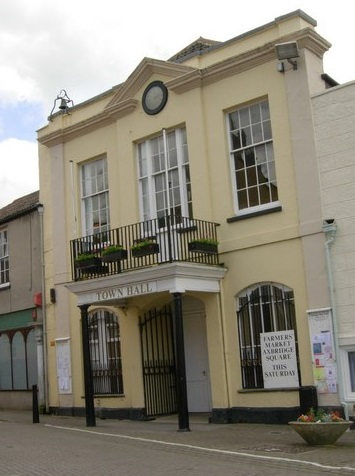
Axbridge Town Hall

There are two tiers of local government covering Axbridge, at parish and unitary authority level: Axbridge Town Council and Somerset Council. The town council has its office in the Church Rooms at Church Steps, and meets at Axbridge Town Hall on The Square. The Town Hall was built in 1830.

For national elections, Axbridge forms part of the Wells and Mendip Hills constituency.

=== Administrative history ===
Axbridge was an ancient parish in the Winterstoke hundred of Somerset.

Axbridge was also an ancient borough. In 1835, commissioners appointed by the government conducted a survey of boroughs across the country. The commissioners reported that the early history of the borough of Axbridge was obscure; they noted a local tradition that the borough had been founded by Athelstan (reigned 924–939), but said that this claim rested "on very doubtful authority". The Domesday Book of 1086 recorded burgesses at Axbridge, showing that it was being administered as a borough by that time. A charter of 1556 formally incorporated the borough, establishing a corporation led by a mayor to run the town. In 1835, the borough boundaries were reported to cover the whole parish of Axbridge plus a small part of the neighbouring parish of Compton Bishop which included West Street on the edge of the town.

Axbridge was a parliamentary borough (constituency) in the 13th and 14th centuries, returning members of parliament in the reigns of Edward I and Edward III.

Axbridge was considered too small to be converted into a municipal borough when those were introduced in 1836, and it was therefore left unreformed. The borough continued to exist after 1836, but its corporation was ineligible to take on any new local government functions. The borough and its corporation were eventually abolished in 1886.

When elected parish and district councils were introduced under the Local Government Act 1894, Axbridge was given a parish council and included in the Axbridge Rural District. Under the Local Government Act 1972, parish councils were given the right to declare their parishes to be a town, which allowed them to take the title of town council and appoint a mayor. Axbridge Parish Council exercised this right in 1973, becoming Axbridge Town Council and appointing the town's first mayor since the old corporation had been abolished in 1886.

Axbridge Rural District was abolished in 1974. Axbridge then became part of the new district of Sedgemoor. Sedgemoor was abolished in 2023. Somerset County Council then took over district-level functions across its area, making it a unitary authority, and was renamed Somerset Council.

== Facilities ==
In 2012, The Roxy community cinema was reopened after a five-year renovation programme. This was aided by the Big Lottery Fund, and re-used old seats from the Colston Hall in Bristol. It has 32 seats and an art deco box office. The premises used to be the Axbridge Lion pub, a Georgian Grade II listed building.

The Axbridge Film Society was based at the cinema. In 2016 volunteers raised £5,000 for repairs to the cinema and plans have been drawn up for further refurbishment and the installation of new sound and projection equipment.. The cinema closed pre-Covid.

In June 2025 a new organisation called Axe Vale Arts (AVA) set up in Axbridge as "a home for creativity, community, and culture." The project is reimagining the vacant Methodist Church as a space for a regular schedule of music, art, exhibitions, spoken word, open-mic, theatre and workshops.

== Church of St John ==
The 13th-century parish Church of St John is a grade I listed building.

Work on the current building began in the early 15th century, and grew from an earlier building dating back to about 1230. The church is built of limestone and decorated with Doulting stone, while the steps are an interesting example of dolomitic conglomerate, which is known as puddingstone. The crossing tower is over 100 feet (30 m) high, and holds six bells, one of which dating from 1723 was made by Edward Bilbie of the Bilbie family. The statue on the east side is that of St John the Baptist. On the west side is a king — perhaps Henry VII, which would place it after 1485. The north-aisle ceiling retains some mediaeval painted panels, and amongst the carved bosses is the head of a Green Man, with leaves sprouting around his face. The nave roof is Jacobean and dates from 1636. Restoration was undertaken in 1888 by J.D. Sedding, who contributed the fine parclose screens.

== Status of settlement ==
In contrast to the much larger settlement of Cheddar immediately to the south east that remains a village, Axbridge is a town. This apparently illogical situation is explained by the relative importance of the two places in historic times. While Axbridge grew in importance as a centre for cloth manufacture in the Tudor period and gained a charter from King John, Cheddar remained a more dispersed dairy-farming village until the advent of tourism and the arrival of the railway in the Victorian era.

== Workhouse ==
The Axbridge Union workhouse was erected in 1837 on the south side of West Street in Axbridge. The Poor Law Commissioners authorised expenditure of £4,496 17s 6d on construction of the building, which was intended to accommodate 250 inmates. It was designed by Samuel T Welch, who was also the architect of workhouses at Wells and Clifton. By 1929 the workhouse had become officially known as Axbridge Poor Law Institution.

== Events ==
On the Saturday of the first Bank Holiday weekend in May, the annual Somerset Showcase took place. This includes craft displays and market, farmers' market, entertainment, exhibitions and live music in the evening. September sees the annual Blackberry Carnival, Fair in the Square and Harvest Home, which was introduced in 2007. Other events throughout the year include the Progressive Supper and Santa in the Square. Since 2009, a Concert by Candlelight has been held in the Church of St John the Baptist to coincide with Earth Hour, when people try to reduce their electricity usage.

Axbridge hosts one of the few remaining historical pageants in the UK every 10 years. This started in 1967 in celebration of the opening of the bypass. The next pageant was in 1970 and there has been one every decade since then except the 2020 pageant which was delayed until 2022 because of the COVID-19 pandemic. The pageant features a cast of 300 and charts the town's history in 15 scenes featuring battles, riots and fights with live music, horses and livestock, plus a train and vintage cars. The 2022 pageant programme was expanded to be a small festival with live music in the evenings.

Axbridge Cricket Club was established in 2004, and plays around 35 friendly matches per season. The club also enjoys an annual club tour and plays other friendly sides around the Somerset county.

The town holds a farmers' market in The Square on the first Saturday of each month.

== Notable residents ==
- William Naish (1766/7–1800), an English miniature painter.
- Maurice Vidal Portman (1860–1935) a British naval officer, who documented some of the Andamanese peoples between 1879 and 1901
- Brigadier-General Ernest Tandy (1879–1953), a British Army officer who played first-class cricket for Somerset in 1904 and 1905.
- Admiral Sir Mark Pizey (1899–1993), a senior Royal Navy officer who served as the last Commander-in-Chief and first Chief of Naval Staff of the Indian Navy from 1951 to 1955.
- Timothy Reynish (born 1938), a conductor of wind bands and wind ensembles
- James Heappey, (born 1981), politician, MP for Wells from 2015 to 2024

== See also ==
- Cheddar Reservoir
