= St Peter's Church, Catcott =

Church in Somerset, England

Church of St Peter
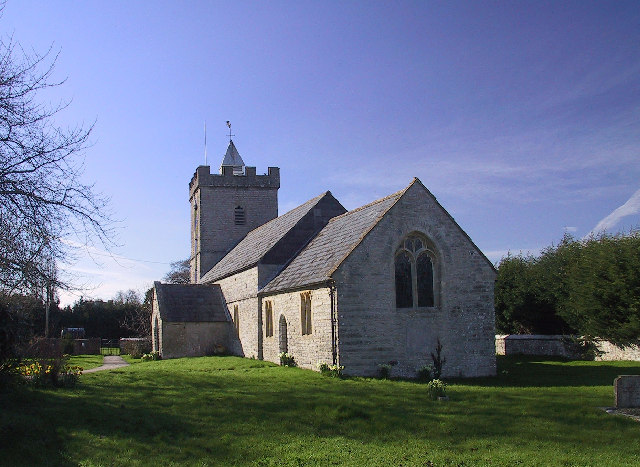

- Location within Somerset

General information
- Location: Catcott, England
- Coordinates: 51.1496°N 2.8675°W
- Completed: 15th century

The Anglican Church of St Peter in Catcott, Somerset, England dates predominantly from the 15th century, but still includes some minor 13th century work, and has been designated as a Grade I listed building.

The church was formerly one of the Polden Chapels held under Moorlinch, it was adjudged in 1548 to have been a chantry chapel and thus liable to closure and sale by Edward VI's commissioners. It was bought by William Coke, who already held the tithes. He armed himself to keep out the parishioners until 1552 when he demolished it. Following a series of court cases he was forced to rebuild it.

The church includes a nave, chancel and a north chapel which has been converted into a vestry. The two-stage west tower is supported by diagonal buttresses. One of the church bells was cast in 1716 by Edward Bilbie of the Bilbie family. The octagonal font dates from the 13th century.

The church has been placed on the Heritage at Risk Register due to structural problems with the walls and roof. Work has been carried out to improve the fabric of the building at a cost of over £100,000.

The parish is part of the Polden Wheel benefice within the Diocese of Bath and Wells.

== See also ==
- List of Grade I listed buildings in Sedgemoor
- List of towers in Somerset
