= Chew Stoke =

Village and civil parish in Somerset, England

Coordinates: 51.3507°N 2.6383°W

- Village and civil parish
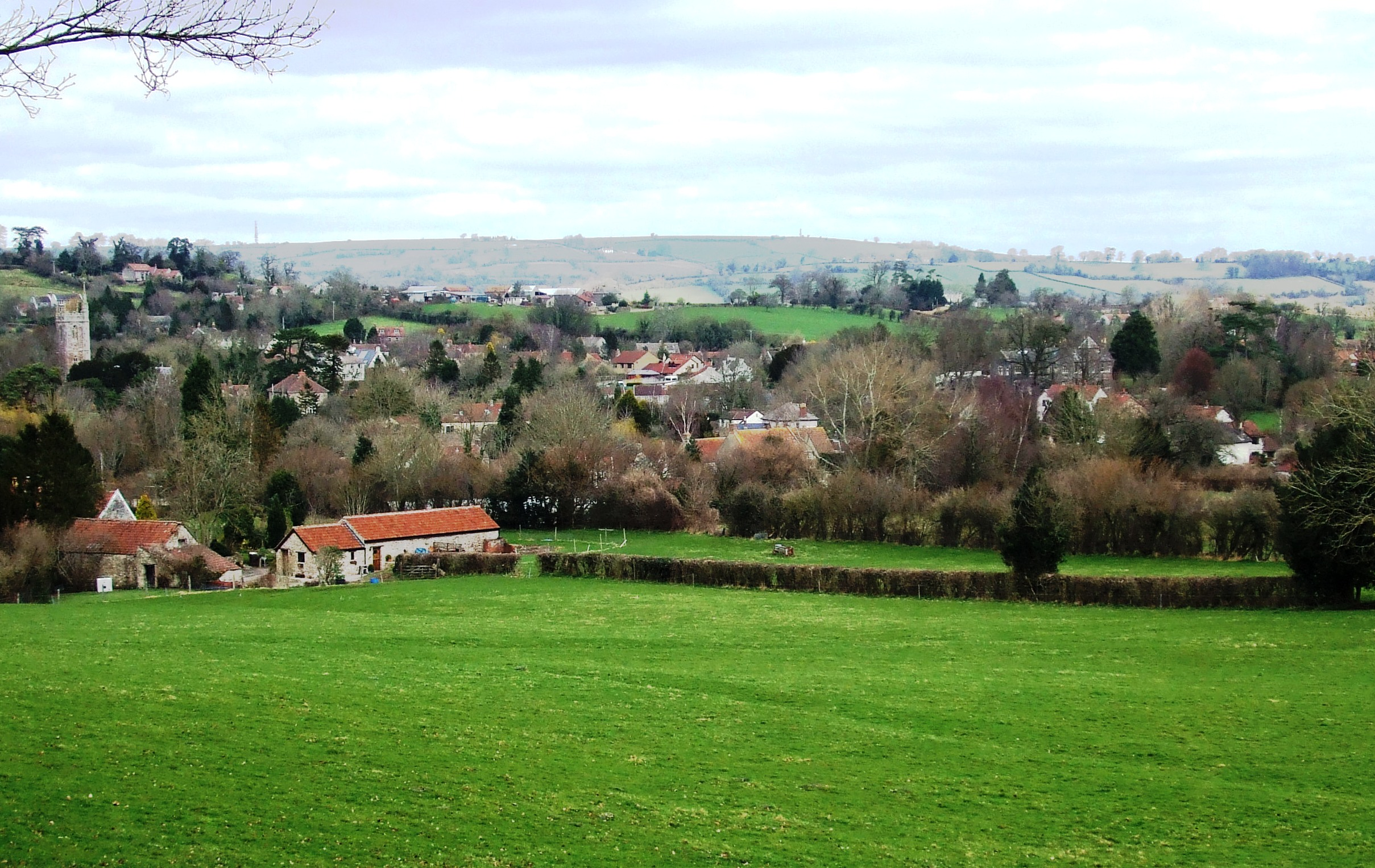
- A view of Chew Stoke

- Location within Somerset
- Interactive map of Chew Stoke
- Area: 3.1 sq mi (8.0 km^{2})
- Population: 1,038 (2021)
  - Density: 335/sq mi (129/km^{2})
- OS grid reference: ST555615
  - London: 111 mi (179 km) E
- Civil parish: Chew Stoke
- Unitary authority: Bath and North East Somerset
- Ceremonial county: Somerset
- Region: South West
- Country: England
- Sovereign state: United Kingdom
- Settlements: Chew Stoke; Breach Hill
- Post town: BRISTOL
- Postcode district: BS40
- Dialling code: 01275
- Police: Avon and Somerset
- Fire: Avon
- Ambulance: South Western
- UK Parliament: North East Somerset and Hanham
- Website: www.chewstoke.org.uk

Chew Stoke is a small village and civil parish in Chew Valley, in Somerset, England, about 8 miles (13 km) south of Bristol and 10 miles (16 km) north of Wells. It is at the northern edge of the Mendip Hills, a region designated by the United Kingdom as an Area of Outstanding Natural Beauty, and is within the Bristol and Bath green belt. The parish includes the hamlet of Breach Hill, which is approximately 2 miles (3.2 km) southwest of Chew Stoke itself.

Chew Stoke has a long history, as shown by the number and range of its heritage-listed buildings. The village is at the northern end of Chew Valley Lake, which was created in the 1950s, close to a dam, pumping station, sailing club, and fishing lodge. A tributary of the River Chew, which rises in Strode, runs through the village.

The population of 1,038 is served by one shop, one working public house, a primary school and a bowling club. Together with Chew Magna, it forms the ward of Chew Valley North in the unitary authority of Bath and North East Somerset. Chew Valley School and its associated leisure centre are less than a mile (1.6 km) from Chew Stoke. The village has some areas of light industry but is largely agricultural; many residents commute to nearby cities for employment.

== History ==
=== Prehistory ===
Archaeological excavations carried out between 1953 and 1955 by Philip Rahtz and Ernest Greenfield from the Ministry of Works found evidence of extensive human occupation of the area. Consecutive habitation, spanning thousands of years from the Upper Palaeolithic, Mesolithic, and Neolithic periods (Old, Middle, and New Stone Age), to the Bronze and Iron Ages had left numerous artefacts behind. Discoveries have included stone knives, flint blades, and the head of a mace, along with buildings and graves.

=== Romano-Celtic temple ===
Chew Stoke is the site of a Romano-Celtic double-octagonal temple, possibly dedicated to the god Mercury. The temple, on Pagans Hill, was excavated by Philip Rahtz between 1949 and 1951. It consisted of an inner wall, which formed the sanctuary, surrounded by an outer wall forming an ambulatory, or covered walkway 56.5 feet (17.2 m) across. It was first built in the late 3rd century but was twice rebuilt, finally collapsing in the 5th century. The positioning of the temple on what is now known as Pagans Hill may seem apt, but there is no evidence for any link between the existence of the temple and the naming of the road.

=== Middle Ages ===
During the Middle Ages, farming was the most important activity in the area, and farming, both arable and dairy, continues today. There were also orchards producing fruits such as apples, pears, and plums. Evidence exists of lime kilns, used in the production of mortar for the construction of local churches.

In the Domesday Book of 1086, Chew Stoke was listed as Chiwestoche, and was recorded as belonging to Gilbert fitz Turold. He conspired with Robert Curthose, the Duke of Normandy, against King William Rufus, and subsequently all his lands were seized. The next recorded owner was Lord Beauchamp of Hache. He became "lord of the manor" when the earls of Gloucester, with hereditary rights to Chew Stoke, surrendered them to him. According to Stephen Robinson, the author of Somerset Place Names, the village was then known as Chew Millitus, suggesting that it may have had some military potential. The name "Stoke", from the old English stoc, meaning a stockade, may support that idea.

The parish was part of the hundred of Chew.

=== Bilbie family of bell and clockmakers ===
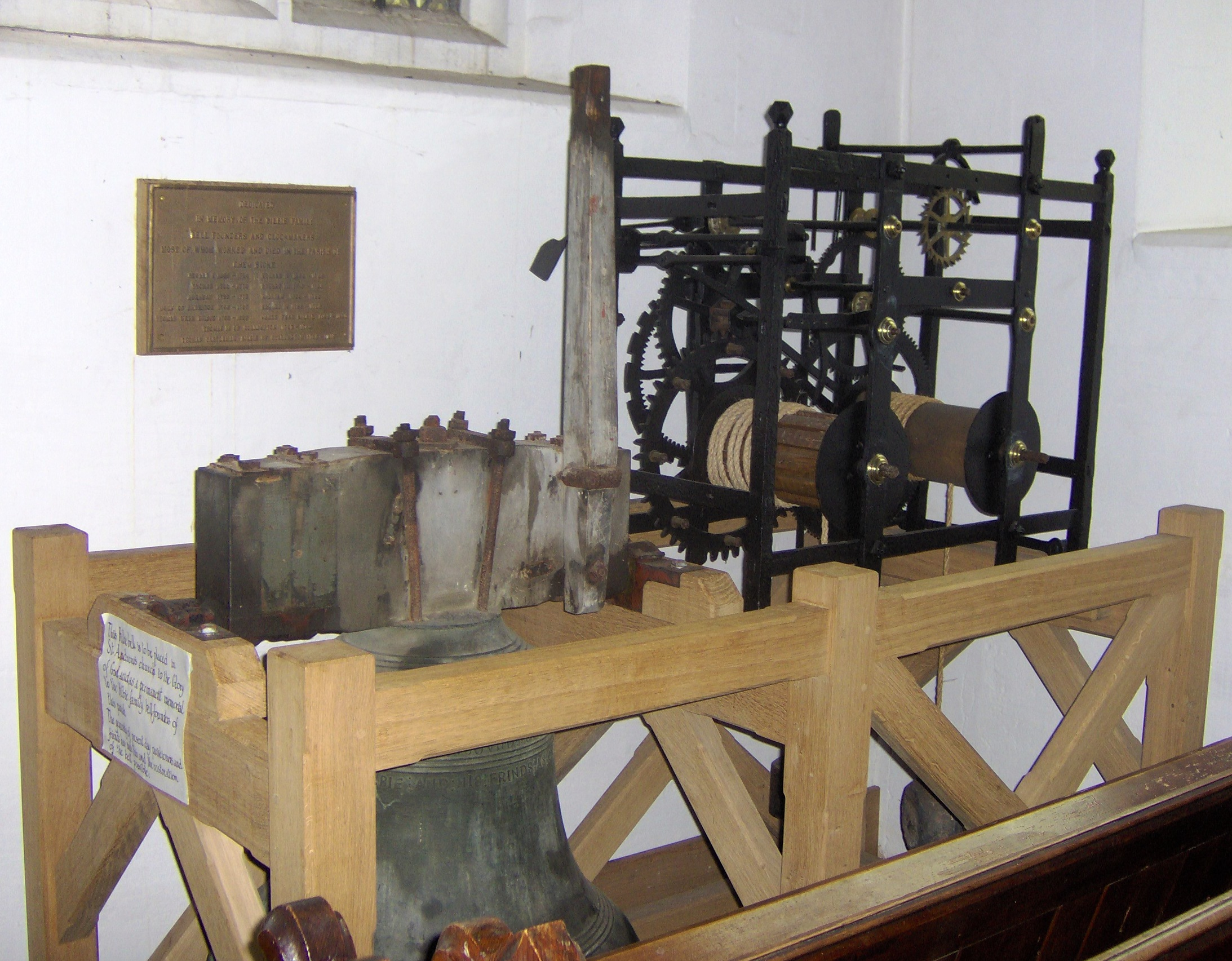
Bilbie bell and clock mechanism, kept in St Andrew's Church as a memorial to the family

The Bilbie family of bell founders and clockmakers lived and worked in Chew Stoke for more than 200 years, from the late 17th century until the 19th century. They produced more than 1,350 church bells, which were hung in churches all over the West Country. Their oldest surviving bell, cast in 1698, is still giving good service in the local St Andrew's Church. The earliest Bilbie clocks date from 1724 and are highly prized. They are mostly longcase clocks, the cheapest with 30-hour movements in modest oak cases, but some have high quality eight-day movements with additional features, such as showing the high tide at Bristol docks. These latter clocks were fitted into quality cabinet maker cases and command high prices.

=== Recent history ===
In the 20th century, Chew Stoke expanded slightly with the influx of residents from the Chew Valley Lake area. These new residents were moved to Chew Stoke when the lake was created in the 1950s. In World War II, 42 children and three teachers, who had been evacuated from Avenmore school in London, were accommodated in the village. On 10 July 1968, torrential rainfall, with 175 millimetres (7 in) falling in 18 hours on Chew Stoke, double the area's average rainfall for the whole of July, led to widespread flooding in the Chew Valley, and water reached the first floor of many buildings. The damage in Chew Stoke was not as severe as in some of the surrounding villages, such as Pensford; however, fears that the Chew Valley Lake dam would be breached caused considerable anxiety.

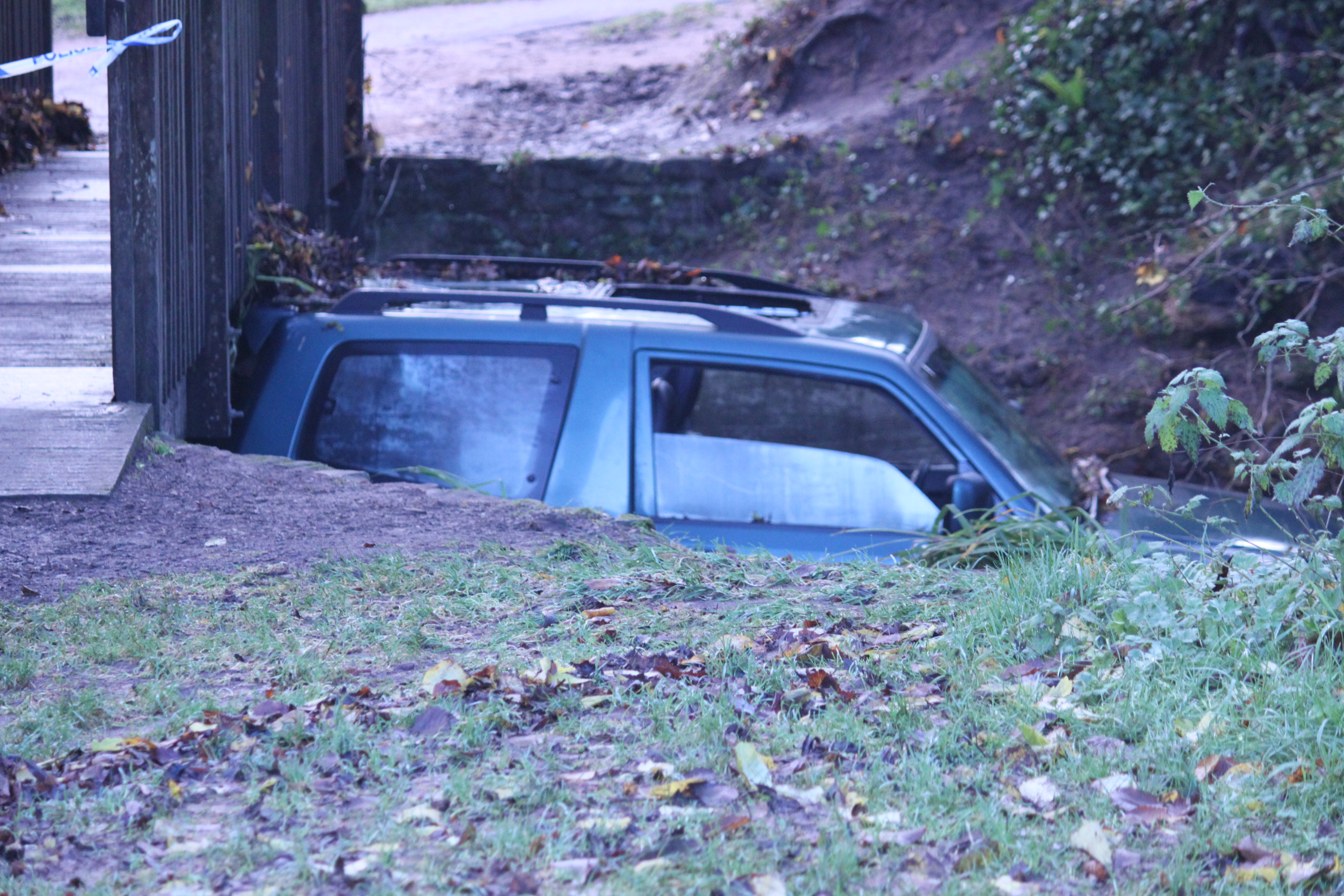
The car in Chew Stoke in which a man died on 22 November 2012

On 4 February 2001, Princess Anne opened the Rural Housing Trust development at Salway Close. Each year, over a weekend in September (usually the first), a "Harvest Home" is held with horse and pet shows, bands, a funfair, and other entertainments. The Harvest Home was cancelled in 1997 as a mark of respect following the death of Princess Diana in the previous week. The Radford's factory site, where refrigeration equipment was formerly manufactured, was identified as a brownfield site suitable for residential development in the 2002 Draft Local Plan of Bath and North East Somerset. That plan has generated controversy about balancing land use to meet residential, social, and employment needs.

During November 2012 a series of floods affected many parts of Britain. On 22 November a man died after his car was washed down a flooded brook in Chew Stoke and trapped against a small bridge.

== Governance ==
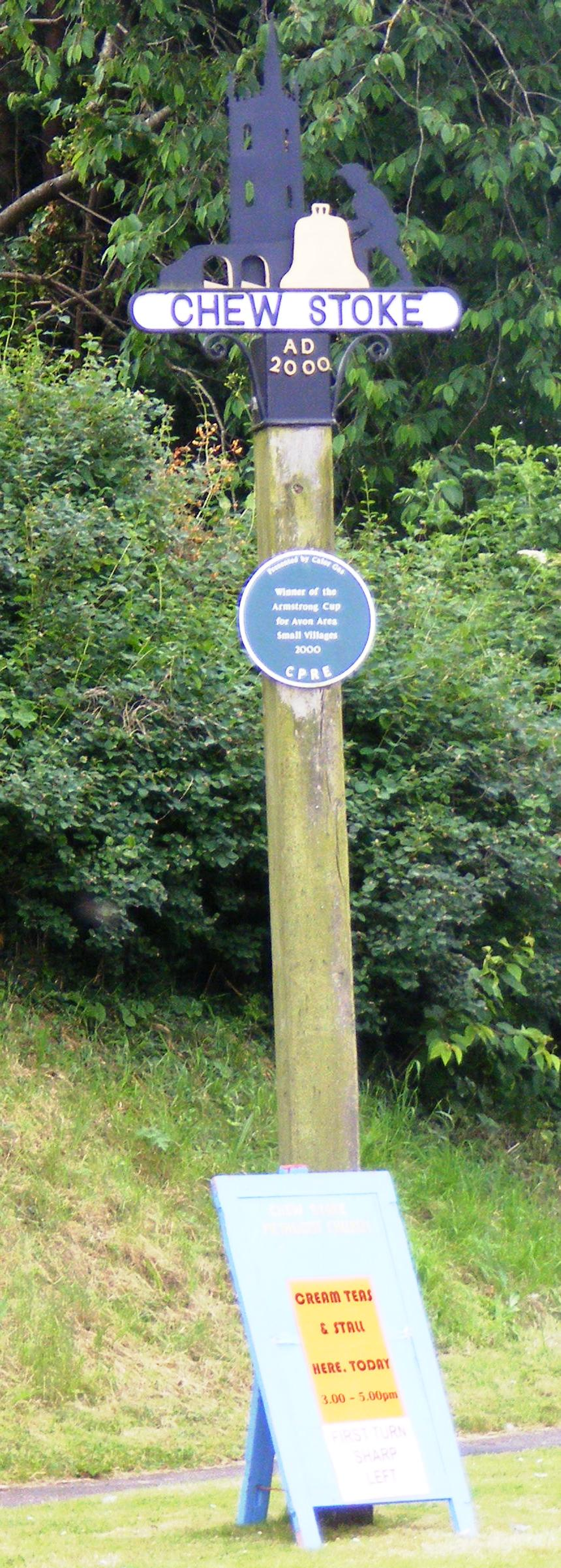
Village sign in Chew Stoke

Chew Stoke has its own nine-member parish council with responsibility for local issues, including setting an annual precept (local rate) to cover the council's operating costs and producing annual accounts for public scrutiny. The parish council evaluates local planning applications and works with the local police, district council officers, and neighbourhood watch groups on matters of crime, security, and traffic. The council's role also includes initiating projects for the maintenance and repair of parish facilities, as well as consulting with the district council on the maintenance, repair, and improvement of highways, drainage, footpaths, public transport, and street cleaning. Conservation matters (including trees and listed buildings) and environmental issues are also the responsibility of the council.

The village is part of the ward of Chew Valley in the unitary authority of Bath and North East Somerset, which has the wider responsibility for providing services such as education, refuse collection, and tourism. The ward is currently represented by Councillors Anna Box and David Harding, members of the Liberal Democrats. It is also part of the North East Somerset and Hanham, and was part of the South West England constituency of the European Parliament prior to Britain leaving the European Union in January 2020.

The police service is provided by Avon and Somerset Constabulary with two Community Support Officer and one police officer covering the wider Chew Valley area. The Avon Fire and Rescue Service have a fire station at Chew Magna.

== Geography ==
The area of Chew Stoke is surrounded by arable land and dairy farms on the floor of the Chew Valley. It is located along the Strode Brook tributary of the River Chew, on the northwest side of the Chew Valley Lake. While much of the area has been cleared for farming, trees line the tributary and many of the roads. The village is built along the main thoroughfare, Bristol Road, which runs northeast to southwest. An older centre is located along Pilgrims Way, which loops onto Bristol Road and features an old stone packhorse bridge—now pedestrianised—and a 1950s Irish bridge, used as a ford in winter. The bridge is 7 feet 6 inches (2.29 m) wide and has 36 inches (910 mm) parapets. Houses line both of these roads, with residential cul-de-sacs and lanes extending from them.

Chew Stoke is approximately 8 miles (13 km) south of Bristol, 10 miles (16 km) north of Wells, 15 miles (24 km) west of Bath, 17 miles (27 km) east of Weston-super-Mare, and 9 miles (14 km) southwest of Keynsham. It is 1.3 miles (2.1 km) south of Chew Magna on the B3130 road that joins the A37 and A38. The A368 crosses the valley west of the lake. The "Chew Valley Explorer" bus route 672/674, running from Bristol Bus Station to Cheddar, provides public transport access. This service is operated by CT coaches and Eurotaxis and subsidised by Bath and North East Somerset council. In 2002, a 1.9-mile (3.1 km) cycle route, the Chew Lake West Green Route, was opened around the western part of the lake from Chew Stoke. It forms part of the Padstow to Bristol West Country Way, National Cycle Network Route 3. It has all-weather surfacing, providing a smooth off-road facility for ramblers, mobility-challenged visitors, and cyclists of all abilities. Funding was provided by Bath and North East Somerset Council, with the support of Sustrans and the Chew Valley Recreational Trail Association. The minor roads around the lake are also frequently used by cyclists. Bristol Airport is approximately 10 miles (16 km) away, and the nearest train stations are Keynsham, Bath Spa, and Bristol Temple Meads.

== Demography ==
The population of Chew Stoke, according to the census of 1801, was 517. This number increased slowly during the 19th century to a maximum of 819 but fell to around 600 by the end of the century. The population remained fairly stable until World War II. During the latter half of the 20th century, the population of the village rose to 905 people. Data for 1801–1971 is available at Britain Through Time; data for 1971–2001 is available from BANES(2011 Census) The 2001 Census gives detailed information about the Chew Valley North ward, which includes both Chew Magna and Chew Stoke. The ward had 2,307 residents, living in 911 households, with an average age of 42.3 years. Of those, 77% of residents described their health as 'good', 21% of 16- to 74-year-olds had no work qualifications, and the area had an unemployment rate of 1.3%. In the Index of Multiple Deprivation 2004, the ward was ranked at 26,243 out of 32,482 wards in England, where 1 was the most deprived and 32,482 the least deprived. A small number of light industrial/craft premises exist at "Fairseat Workshops", formerly the site of a dairy. However, they provide little employment, and many residents commute to jobs in nearby cities. The population has increased since; in the 2011 census there were 991 residents recorded, and 1,038 in the 2021 census.

Population of Chew Stoke
Year	1801	1811	1821	1831	1841	1851	1861	1871	1881	1891
Population	517	524	681	693	825	819	758	693	696	653
Year	1901	1911	1921	1931	1941	1951	1961	1971	1981	1991
Population	635	598	622	654	n/a	738	819	841	818	866
Year	2001	2011	2021							
Population	905	991	1038							

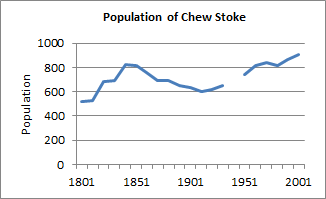

== Landmarks ==
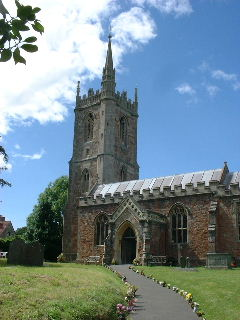
St Andrews Church, Chew Stoke

=== St Andrew's Church ===
St Andrew's Church, a Grade II* listed building on the outskirts of Chew Stoke, was constructed in the 15th century and underwent extensive renovation in 1862. The inside of the church is decorated with 156 angels in wood and stone, and the church includes a tower with an unusual spirelet on the staircase turret. In the tower hang bells cast by the Bilbie family. The reconstructed Moreton Cross in the churchyard was moved there when Chew Valley Lake was flooded, and the base of the cross shaft, about 80 feet (24 m) southwest of the tower, is thought to date from the 14th century and is itself a Grade II* listed building, as is the Webb monument in the churchyard. The churchyard gate, at the southeast entrance, bears a lamp provided by public subscription to commemorate Queen Victoria's Jubilee of 1897 and is a Grade II listed structure.

In the church are bronze plaques commemorating the eleven local people who died in World War I and the six who were killed in World War II. There is also a stained glass window showing a saint with a sword standing on a snake, and crossed flags commemorating those from World War II. There is also a memorial plaque to the local Bilbie family of bell founders and clockmakers inside the church, and just inside the porch, on the left of the church door, is a stone figure holding an anchor, which was moved to the church from Walley Court with the flooding of the lake. There is an unconfirmed story that this was given to the Gilbert family, then living at the court, by Queen Elizabeth I.

=== Rectory ===
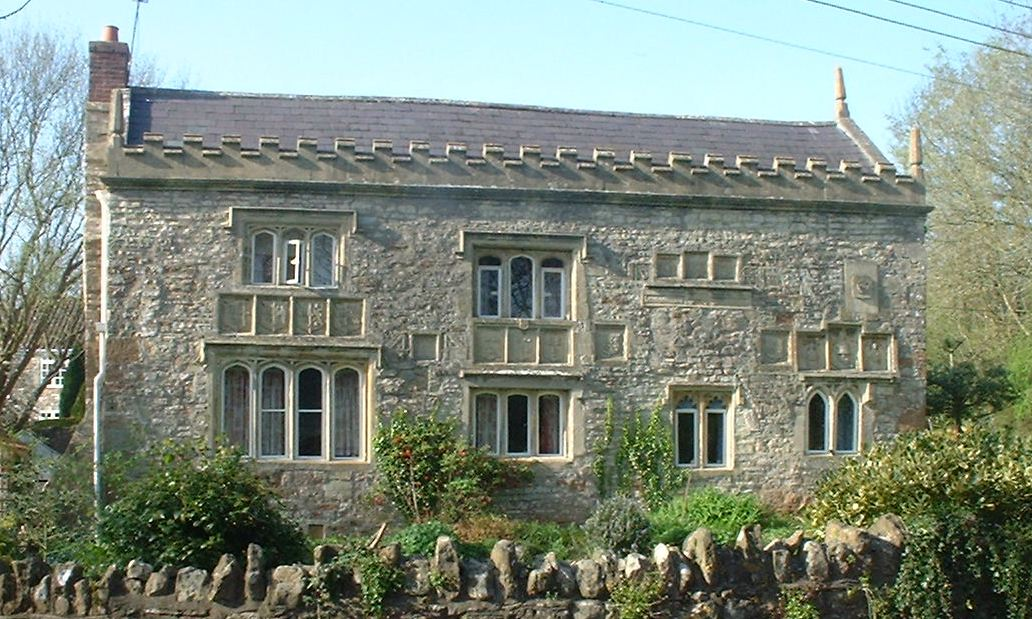
The Old Rectory, south front with carvings of shields

The Rectory, at the end of Church Lane, opposite the church hall, is believed to have been built in 1529 by Sir John Barry, rector 1524–46. It has since undergone substantial renovations, including the addition of a clock tower for the Rev. W.P. Wait and further alterations c.1876 for Rev. J. Ellershaw. The clock tower has since been removed. The building has an ornate south front with carvings of shields bearing the coat of arms of the St Loe family, who were once chief landowners in the area, alone or impaled with arms of Fitzpane, Ancell, de la Rivere, and Malet. It is Grade II* listed.

=== New rectory ===
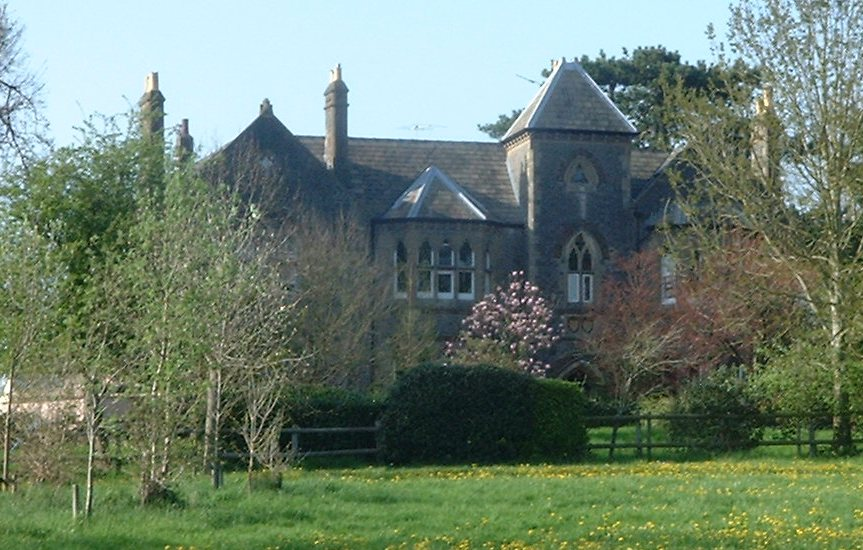
The new rectory

The Reverend John Ellershaw built the new rectory in the 1870s. The last rector to occupy it was Lionel St Clair Waldy from 1907 to 1945. It was then bought by Douglas Wills, who donated it and the rectory field to Winford Hospital as a convalescent home for 16 children. It was later used as a nurses' home before being sold for private use. It is now split into several residential units.

=== Grade II listed buildings ===
As with many cities and towns in the United Kingdom, the age of a number of the buildings in Chew Stoke, including the church, school, and several houses, reflects the long history of the village. For example, Chew Stoke School has approximately 170 pupils between 4 and 11 years old. After the age of 11, most pupils either attend Chew Valley School or any of the independent schools in the area. These two buildings were built in 1858 on the site of a former charity school founded in 1718. The architect was S.B. Gabriel of Bristol. Additional classrooms were built in 1926, and further alterations and extensions were carried out in 1970.

An obelisk on Breach Hill Lane, dating from the early-to-mid-19th century, is said to have been built as a waterworks marker. It has a square limestone plinth about 3 feet (1 m) high. The obelisk is about 32 feet (10 m) high with a pyramidal top and small opening at the top on two sides.

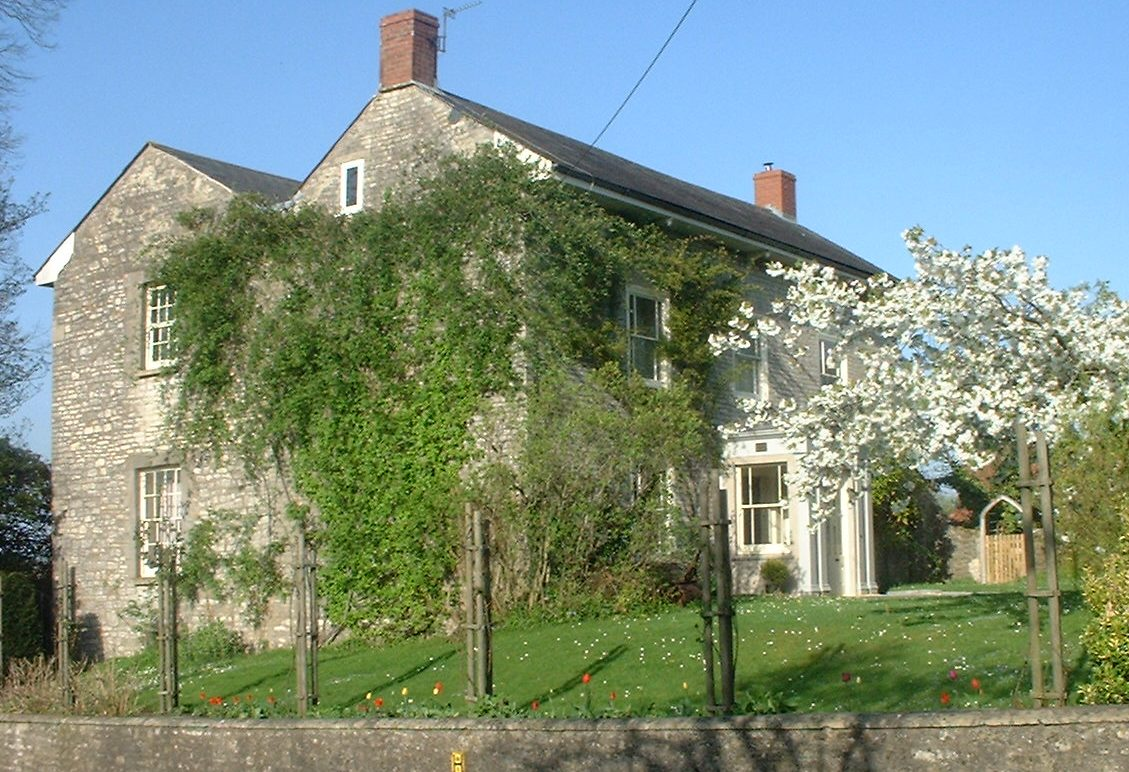
Fairseat Farmhouse

The importance of farming is reflected in the age of many of the farmhouses. Manor Farm, on Scot Lane (not to be confused with at least two other Manor Farms in the locality) is thought to date from 1495 and, as such, is probably the oldest building in the village. Presently (2007) occupied by Mr and Mrs Slater; the building has recently (2002) undergone a sympathetic extension to incorporate an old semi-derelict barn onto the main house for use as a garage and workshop. Mr Slater, a Chartered Engineer, is interested in bringing the art of clock making back to the village. Rookery Farmhouse, in Breach Hill Lane, is dated at 1720, with later 18th century additions to either side of the central rear wing. An attached stable, 20 feet (6 m) northeast of the farmhouse, is also a Grade II listed building. School Farmhouse, in School Lane, dates from the late 17th century and has a studded oak door in the side of the house. Wallis Farmhouse, farther along School Lane, is dated at 1782. Yew Tree Farmhouse, one of the oldest buildings in the area, is a cruck built farmhouse of which there are very few in North Somerset. It was included in the dendrochronology project carried out by the Somerset Vernacular Building Research Group 1996–1998 and the crucks gave a felling date of 1386, the house has been extensively altered and added to over later centuries. North Hill Farmhouse also has 15th-century origins. Paganshill Farmhouse dates from the 17th century. Fairseat Farmhouse is from the 18th century and includes a plaque recording that John Wesley preached at the house on 10 September 1790. In August of that year, Fairseat Farmhouse was "registered among the records of this County as a House set apart for the worship of God and religious exercise for Protestant Dissenters." At that time the house belonged to Anna Maria Griffon. In the garden is a large evergreen oak (Ilex) which measured 98 feet (30 m) across until half of it broke away in a gale in 1976.

The Methodist Chapel was built in 1815/16 after religious services had been established at Fairseat Farm, and the chapel was rebuilt in the late 19th century with limestone walls with stone dressings and a slate hipped roof with brick eaves stacks and crestings.

In the hamlet of Stoke Villice, which is south of the main village, there is a 19th-century milestone inscribed "8 miles to Bristol" that also has listed status.

== Education ==
Chew Stoke Church of England Voluntary Aided Primary School serves the village itself and surrounding villages in the Chew Valley. It is a voluntary controlled school affiliated with the Church of England and linked with the St. Andrew's parish church. It has about 170 pupils between 4 and 11 years old. After the age of 11, most pupils attend Chew Valley School.

The school was founded as a charity in 1718 making it one of the oldest schools in Somerset. Its original buildings were demolished in 1858 and replaced with new ones to designs by S.B. Gabriel that are now Grade II listed. The school bell was donated by the Bilbie family of bell founders based in the village. Additional classrooms were built in 1926, and further alterations and extensions were built in 1970, 1995 and 2001.

In July 2018, the school celebrated its 300th birthday making it one of the oldest state schools in England. A service was held at St Andrew's Church led by the Bishop of Taunton – The Right Reverend Ruth Worsley, and was followed by a tea party at the school, and the planting of a time capsule.

== Bibliography ==
- Durham, I. & M. (1991). Chew Magna and the Chew Valley in old photographs. Redcliffe Press. ISBN 1-872971-61-X.
- Janes, Rowland, ed. (1987). The Natural History of the Chew Valley. Biografix. ISBN 0-9545125-2-9.
- Hucker, E (1997). Chew Stoke recalled in old photographs. S.l.: E. Hucker. ISBN 978-0-9531700-0-5.
