= King John's Hunting Lodge, Axbridge =

Wool-merchant's house in Axbridge, built c. 1460

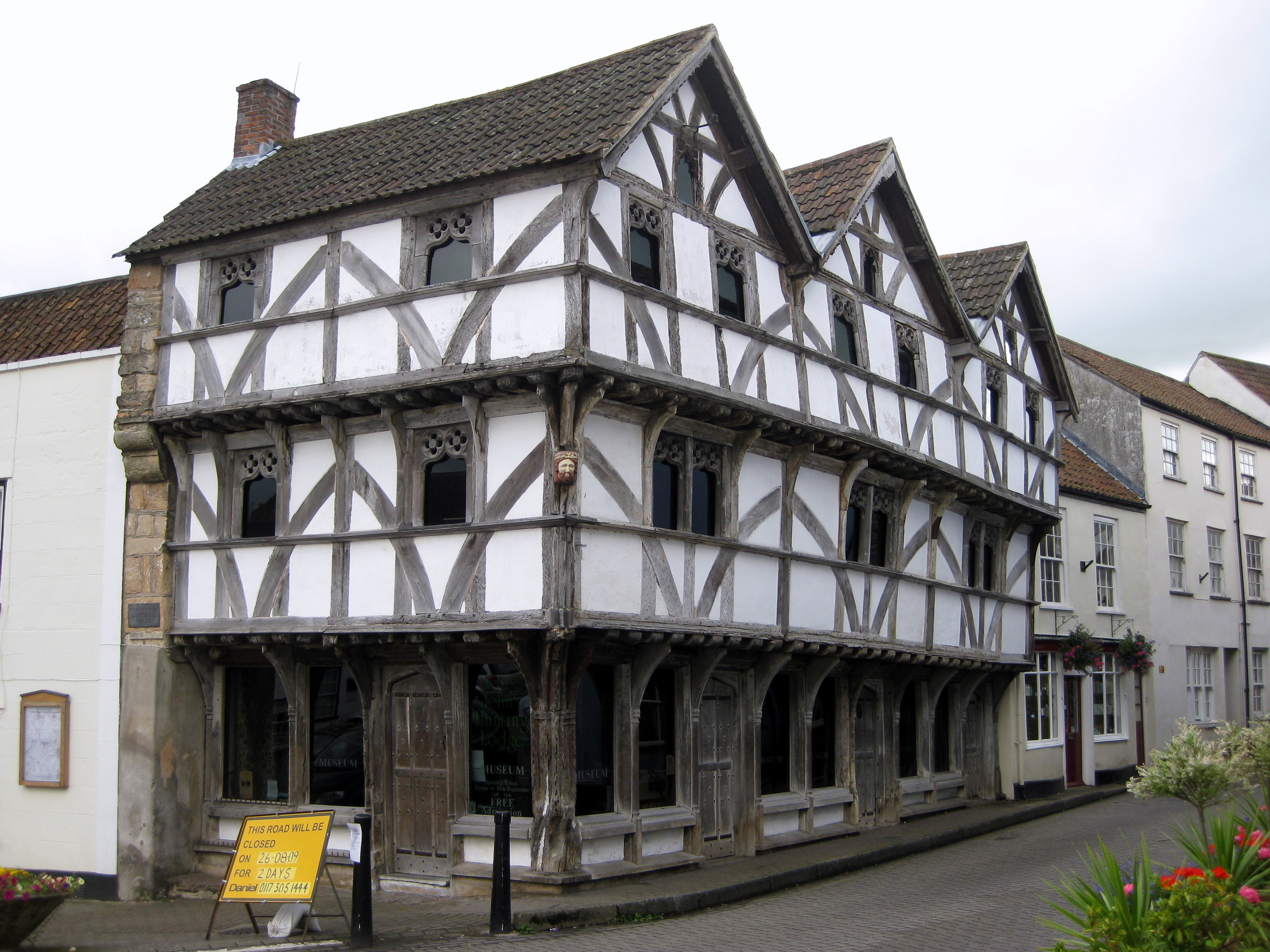
- King John's Hunting Lodge

- Location within Somerset
- 51°17′14″N 2°49′03″W
- Location: Axbridge

History
- Built: 1468

Site notes
- Area: Somerset
- Architectural style: Timber-frame
- Governing body: Axbridge and District Museum Trust
- Owner: National Trust

Listed Building – Grade II*
- Official name: King John's Hunting Lodge (Axbridge Museum)
- Designated: 9 February 1961
- Reference no.: 1059142

King John's Hunting Lodge is a wool-merchant's house built c. 1468, long after the death of King John in 1216, in Axbridge, a town in the English county of Somerset. It is a jettied timber-frame building of three storeys, occupying a corner plot on the town square. The building has served a variety of purposes with shops on the ground floor and workshops and living quarters on the first and second floors. At one time part of the building was occupied by the King's Head Inn; a sculpture of a king's head, which acted as a sign for the pub, is preserved within and a replica is attached to the outside. The lodge was bequeathed to the National Trust in 1971, and repairs were undertaken to reverse significant deterioration to the building.

The house is leased by the National Trust to Axbridge and District Museum Trust, who operate it as a local museum which includes exhibits relating to local geology and history from the Neolithic to World War II. It is a Grade II* listed building.

== History ==
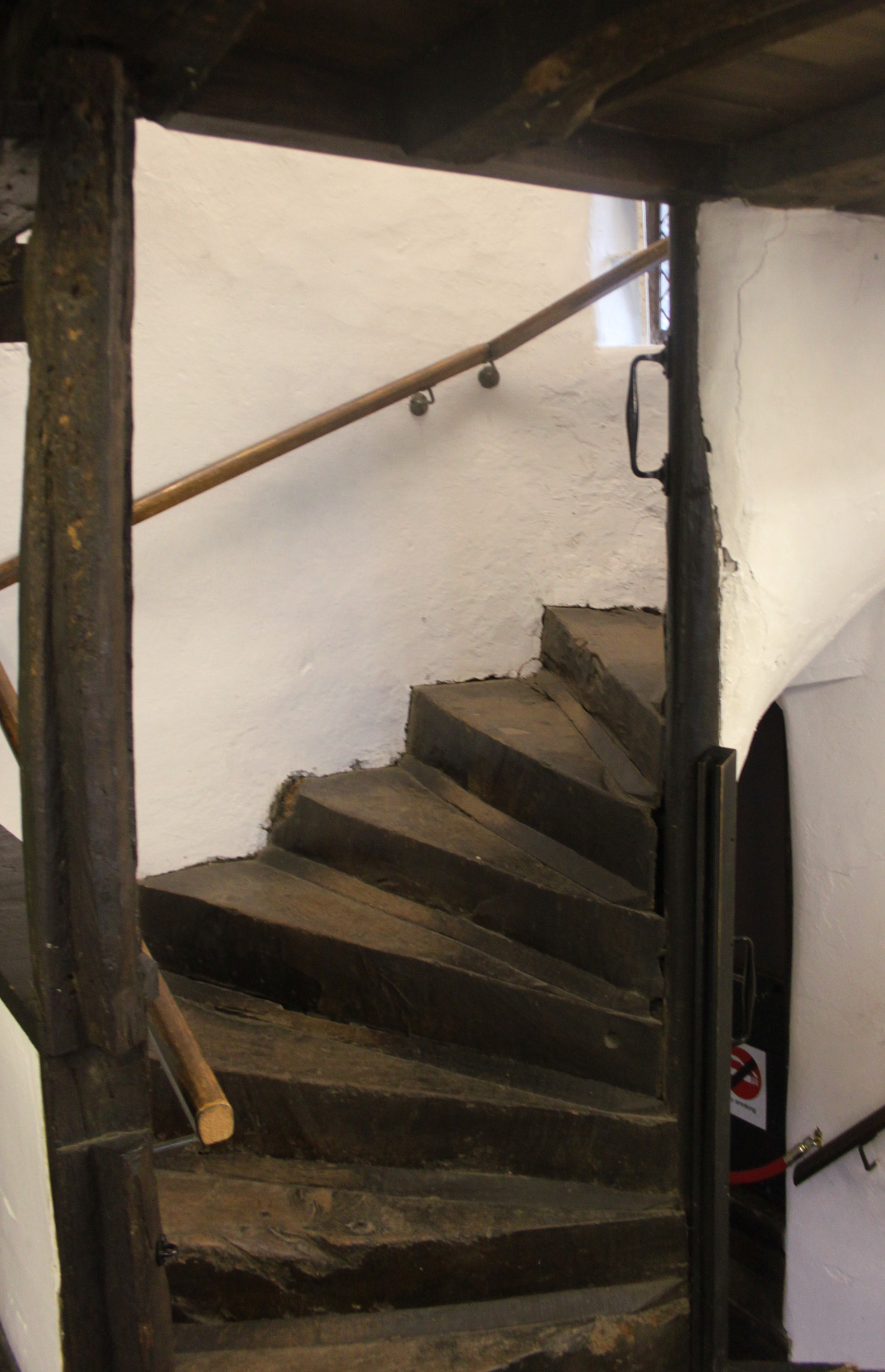
Internal stairs

In 1340 the site of the present building was occupied by a building belonging to John Oldeway. It contained shops and was called "the stockhouse". The current building, which was constructed around 1460, was occupied by shops on the ground floor, living areas and workshops on the first floor, and storage and sleeping areas on the second floor.

The house is the finest of a number of timber-frame houses in the High Street and The Square. The three-storey building is jettied on two adjacent sides and has three gables on the longer side. On the first and second floors curved brackets can be seen which support the floor above. The structure is based around a single wooden post, known as a king post, at the front corner of the building, which supports the floor boards and the horizontal dragon beams that carry the projection of the upper floors at each level.

In the nineteenth and early twentieth centuries, the building housed a succession of shops and underwent various changes which contributed to its physical decline. A Miss Ripley bought the building in 1930, and used it to store her collection of antiques until 1968, allowing the public to see her collection once a year. She bequeathed it to the National Trust in 1971, who undertook the works necessary to make it fit for visitors and saved it from probable destruction.

In overhauling the structure of the premises, the National Trust restored its medieval character by recreating on the ground floor the appearance of arcaded stalls opening onto the street, and the sixteenth-century decoration of the upstairs windows, although this caused a dilemma as it required the removal of fine 18th-century windows.

The origin of the name is unclear as it was not built until long after the reign of King John, who died in 1216. Its present name first appeared in a 1915 publication, The Heart of Mendip by Francis Knight, when it was being run as a saddler's shop. The royal part of the name may have come from the fact that there was a carved king's head on the building, from a time when The King's Head Inn occupied part of the premises, but whether this represented King John or another king is not known. The head was attached to one corner of the exterior, but is now inside the building, and a replica placed on the outside.

== Museum ==
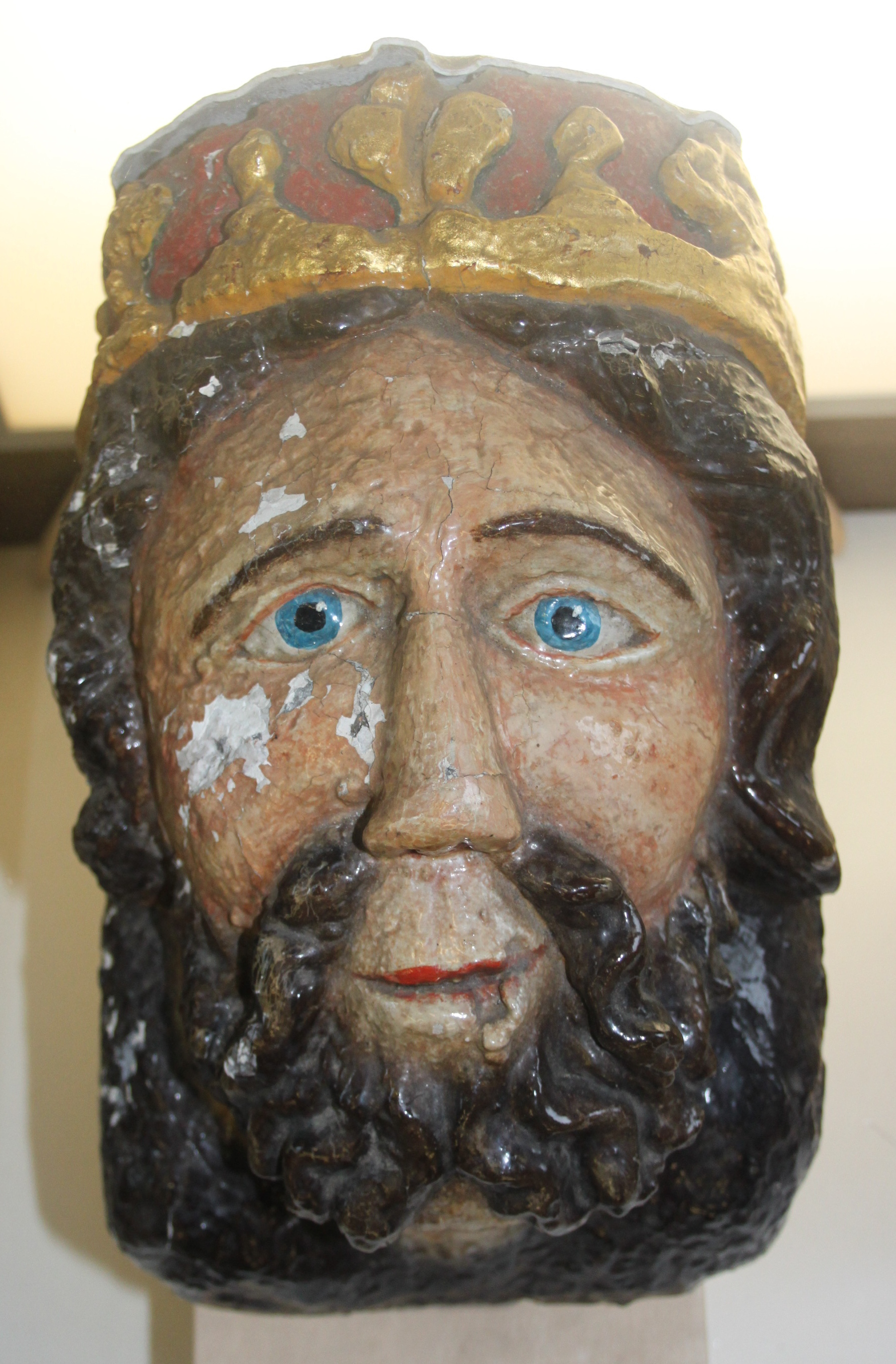
Sculpture of the king's head

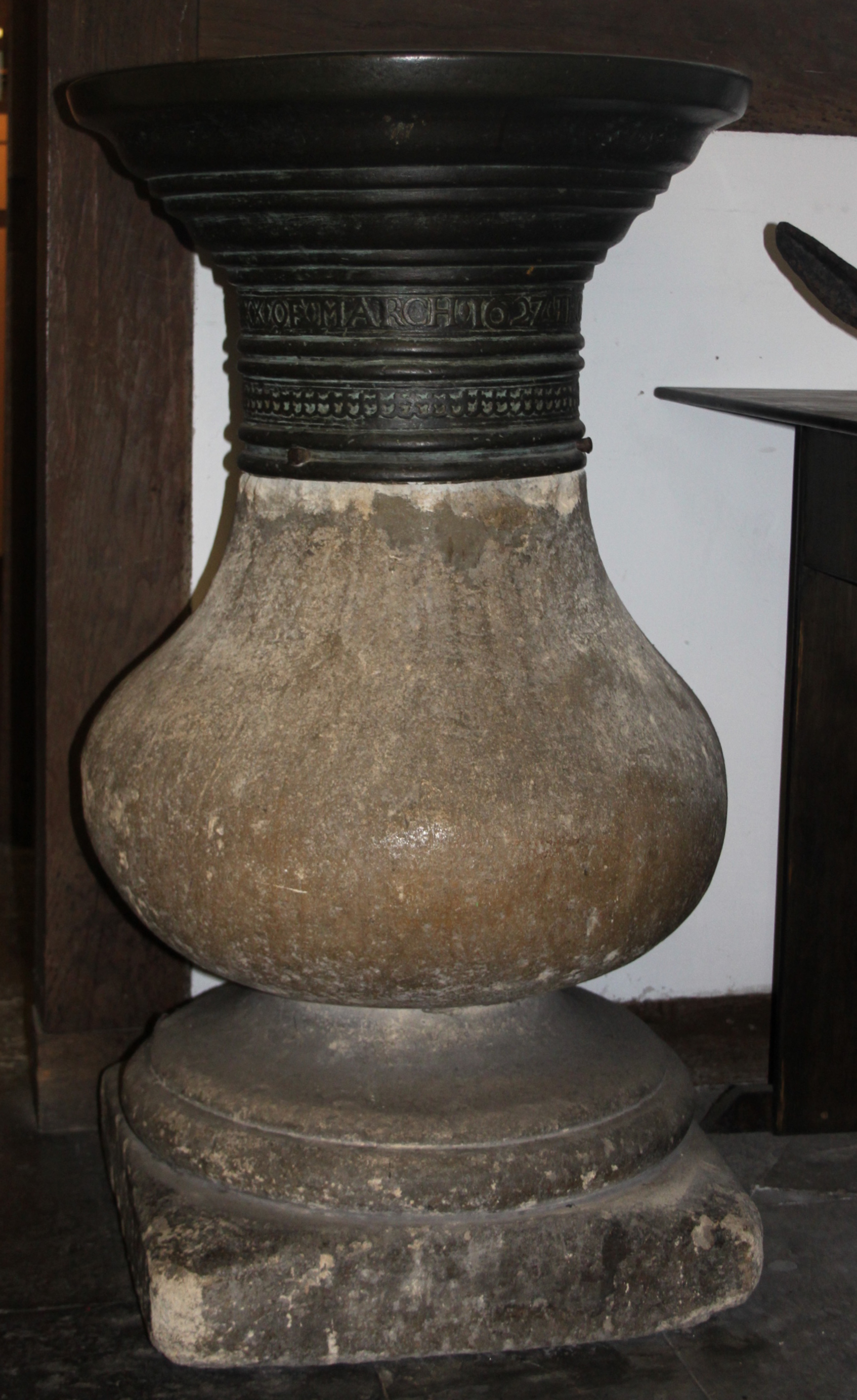
Axbridge nail

The property is owned by the National Trust and run as a local history museum by Axbridge and District Museum Trust with support from Somerset County Museums Service and Axbridge Archaeological and Local History Society. Until 2011 funding was received from Sedgemoor District Council, but this was withdrawn and an entry charge introduced to help pay for the running costs.

The museum aims to illustrate the history, geology and community of Axbridge and the surrounding area (the area of the old Axbridge Rural District, which included many neighbouring villages such as Cheddar, Wedmore, Mark and Winscombe). There is a core of long-term and permanent exhibits, reviewed regularly for possible changes, updates, and revised displays and information, and there is a programme of temporary exhibitions to reflect many aspects of local life and heritage.

Each room has a specific theme, which includes aspects of local history such as life during World War II, and aspects of law and order. Another exhibition shows local geology and archaeological finds from local caves. The exhibits include a fine flint flake which has been identified from the Neolithic occupation of Ebbor Gorge. The museum also displays paintings of local scenes and objects including a clock made by John Bilbie of the Bilbie family, who lived in Axbridge, and a merchants' table known as a "nail", similar to those outside The Exchange in Bristol which were made with a flat top and raised edges to prevent coins from tumbling onto the pavement.

== See also ==
- List of National Trust properties in Somerset
