= St Andrew's Church, Chew Stoke =

Church in Bath and North East Somerset, UK

St Andrew's Church
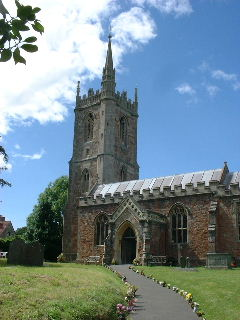

- Location within Somerset

General information
- Location: Chew Stoke, England
- Coordinates: 51.3507°N 2.6383°W
- Completed: 15th century

The Anglican St Andrew's Church is on the outskirts of Chew Stoke, within the English county of Somerset. The church, parts of which date from the 15th century, is a Grade II* listed building.

The stone church's three-stage tower has six bells, three of which were made by the local Bilbie family, to whom a redundant bell at the back of the church serves as a memorial. The interior of the church is largely Victorian and includes 156 angels in wood and stone. The churchyard includes graves and memorials to local residents and the base of a 14th-century cross. The remains of the cross from Morteon were moved to Chew Stoke when their original site was flooded during the construction of Chew Valley Lake in the 1950s.

The Parish of Chew Stoke is within the Benefice of Chew Stoke with Nempnett Thrubwell and forms part of the Diocese of Bath and Wells. Two rectories are associated with the church, one dating from 1529 and both now private residences.

== Architecture ==
The church was constructed in the 15th century in the perpendicular style. The tower remains largely unchanged, but the main body underwent extensive Victorian restoration and the addition of the north isle in 1862. The church is built of local red sandstone and limestone topped by lead roofs. It includes a nave, four bay north aisle and three bay south aisle, chancel and south chapel.

The tower, which was built around 1475, has three stages supported by diagonal buttresses. Its top is surmounted by a paneled parapet and an ornate crown with an elaborate spirelet over the stair turret, with two tiers of arcading.

The church was designated a Grade II* listed building in 1960.

== Bells ==
Bell Number	Founder	Date
Treble	John Taylor	1996
2	Bilbie	1731
3	Bilbie	1718
4	T Mears	1820
5	Bilbie	1698
Tenor	Llewelyn and James	1876

The oldest bell in the tower dates from 1698 and was cast by the Bilbie family who were bell founders and clockmakers based initially in the village. The Bilbie family produced more than 1,350 bells, which are hung in churches all over the West Country. Supplies of the tin and copper used to make bell metal were probably obtained from brass foundries in Kelston and Bristol. The metal was melted in a wood-burning furnace to over 1,500 °C (2,732 °F) and then poured into a mould made from loam, or foundry mud, from the River Chew. Others in St Andrew's are from the same maker are dated 1718 and 1731. The bells were tuned and re-hung into a new frame in 1908 and again in 1996 with a new bell from John Taylor's foundry in Loughborough replacing the treble. The redundant bell is now on display at the back of the church as a memorial to the Bilbies.

== Interior ==
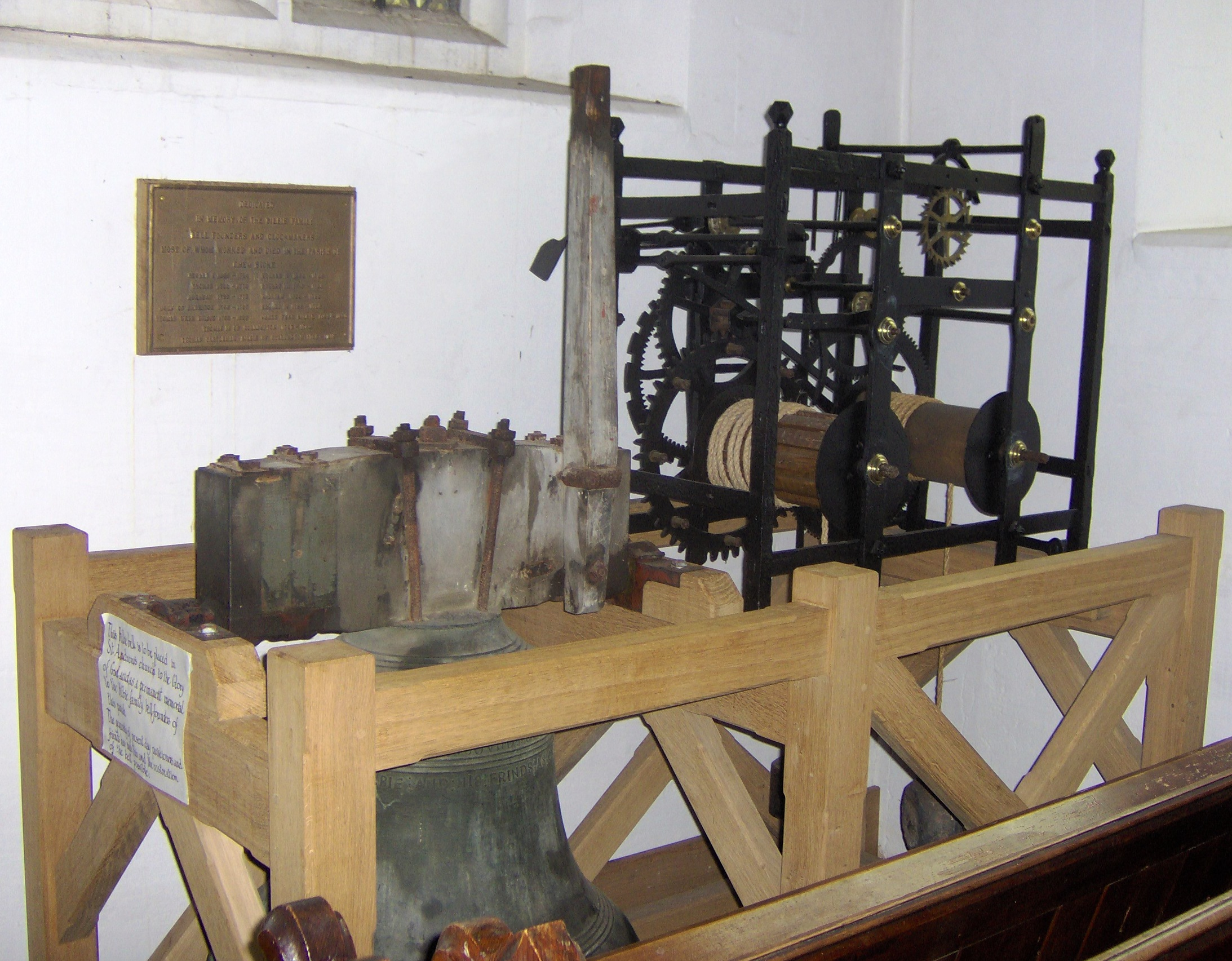
Bilie Bell at the back of the church

The Victorian square font and pulpit match, but are now largely whitewashed, as is much of the rest of the church. Just inside the porch, on the left of the church door, is a stone figure holding an anchor which was moved to the church from Walley Court with the flooding of Chew Valley Lake. There is an unconfirmed story that this was given to the Gilbert family, then living at the court by Queen Elizabeth I. It is possible that it was originally from the site of a nunnery within the parish which was closed with the Dissolution of the Monasteries in 1536.

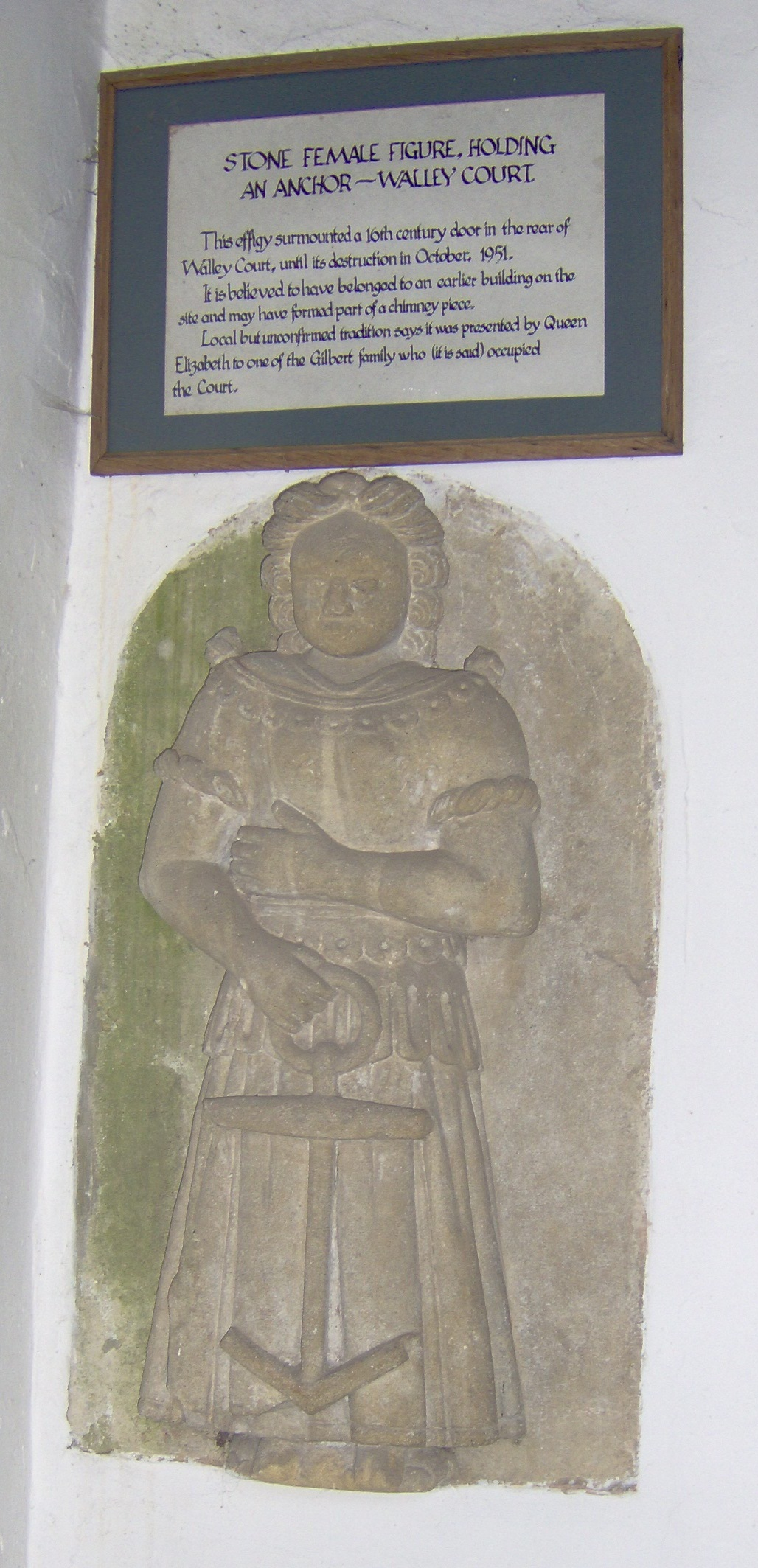
Female stone sculpture holding an anchor, in the porch

The inside of the church is decorated with 156 angels in wood and stone. The church interior also contains a bronze plaque commemorating the eleven people from the village who died in the First World War and six from the Second World War.

There is also a stained glass window showing a saint with a sword standing on a snake and crossed flags, commemorating those from World War II. Several other stained glass windows date from the Victorian era. The window in the tower was donated by a London goldsmith named Mattheson to commemorate the rebuilding of the church in 1863. The east window represents events in the life of Saint Andrew.

One of the altars has, in the past, been dedicated to Wilgefortis a female saint of popular religious imagination whose legend arose in the 14th century, and whose distinguishing feature is a large beard.

There are three wooden chests, two of which date from the 20th century, but the oldest is probably from the 16th century and was a "poor man's chest." These were common in English parishes following the decree by Queen Elizabeth I that each parish provide a strong chest with three keys to keep safe custody of alms for the poor.

== Churchyard memorials ==
The reconstructed Moreton Cross was moved into the churchyard when Chew Valley Lake was flooded in the 1950s.

The Grade II* listed base of a cross shaft in the churchyard, about 24 metres (79 ft) southwest of the tower, is thought to date from the 14th century, as is the Webb monument in the churchyard. The churchyard gate, at the southeast entrance, bears a lamp which was provided by public subscription to commemorate Queen Victoria's Jubilee of 1897, itself a Grade II listed structure.

The churchyard contains the Commonwealth war grave of a Second World War airman.

== Old rectory ==
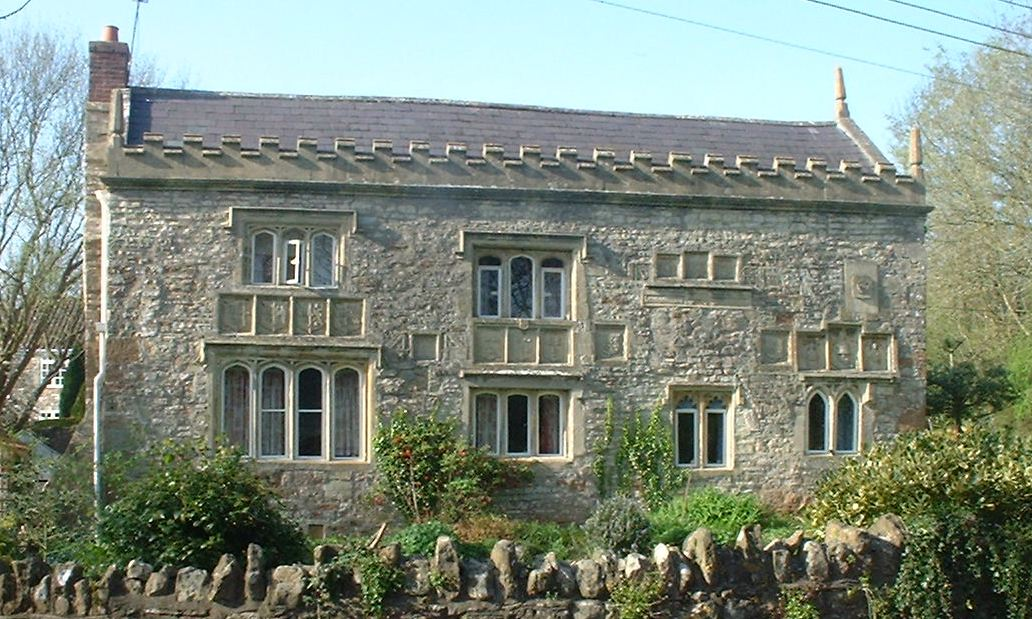
The Old Rectory, south front with carvings of shields

The village hall is at the end of Church Lane, opposite The Rectory which is believed to have been built in 1529 by the rector, Sir John Barry, (Rector 1524–46). It has undergone substantial renovations including the addition of a clock tower for the Rev. W. P. Wait, which has since been removed and further alterations in about 1876 for Rev. J. Ellershaw. The building has an ornate south front with carvings of shields bearing the coat of arms of the St Loe family, who were once chief landowners in the area, alone or impaled with arms of Fitzpane, Ancell, de la Rivere and Malet. It is Grade II* listed. In 1945 it started to be used again as the rectory, for the parish. The parish is within the Benefice of Chew Stoke with Nempnett Thrubwell and forms part of the Diocese of Bath and Wells. The rectory was sold by the church in 2008 and is now a private dwelling.

== New rectory ==
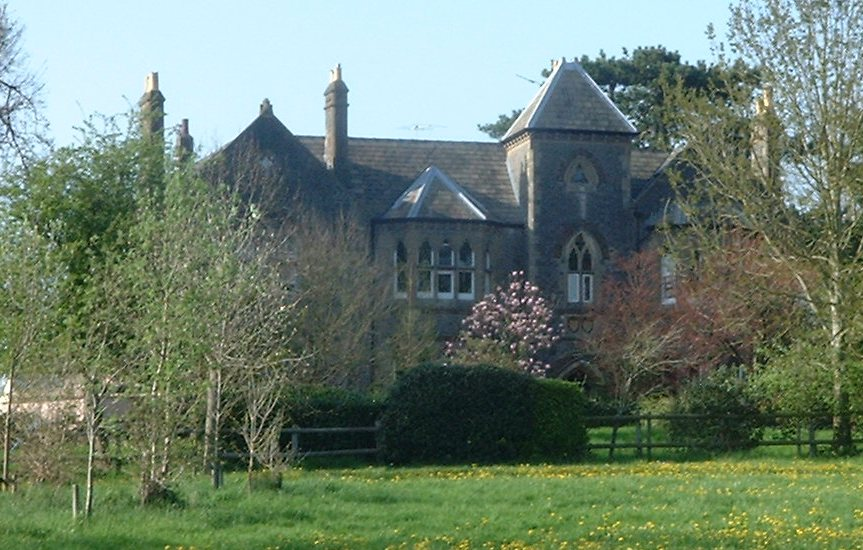
The new rectory

The new rectory was built by the Reverend John Ellershaw in the 1870s. The last rector to occupy it was Lionel St. Clair Waldy from 1907 to 1945. It was then bought by Douglas Wills who donated it and the rectory field to Winford Hospital as a convalescent home for 16 children, and later used as a nurses' home before being sold for private use. Primarily an orthopaedic hospital, Winford was built in 1930, and became a part-military and part-civilian hospital. Wards A to D were for civilian use, while wards E to K, added to the hospital in 1940, were for the treatment of service and civilian war casualties. The hospital closed in 1996, and the rectory is now divided into several residential units.

== See also ==
- List of ecclesiastical parishes in the Diocese of Bath and Wells
