= Chew Valley School =

Location
- Chew Lane; Chew Stoke, Somerset; England; 51.3586°N 2.6228°W

Information
- Type: Academy
- Established: 1958
- Local authority: Bath and North East Somerset Council
- Trust: Lighthouse Schools Partnership
- Department for Education URN: 145482 Tables
- Ofsted: Reports
- Head teacher: Gareth Beynon
- Gender: Coeducational
- Age: 11 to 18
- Enrolment: 1,160 as of 2015
- Website: http://www.chewvalleyschool.co.uk

Chew Valley School is a coeducational secondary school and sixth form situated within the Chew Valley in Somerset in South West England. It is 8 miles (13 km) south of Bristol in the village of Chew Stoke, on a 30-acre (12 ha) site in open countryside overlooking the Chew Valley Lake.

It is the only secondary school in the Chew Valley area, providing further education to local children, from various local primary schools, and some pupils who live outside the catchment area. As of 2015, the school had over 1,160 pupils, including 186 in the Sixth Form.

== History ==
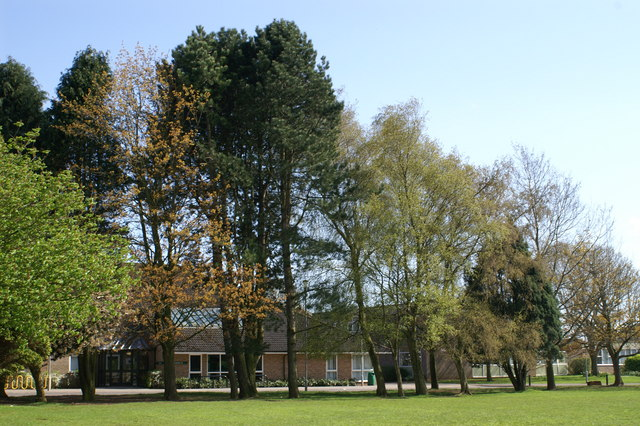
Chew Valley School

The school was proposed in May 1955 in a public notice issued by Somerset County Council Education Committee, to eventually comply with the Education Act 1944 which had required secondary education for all, which had previously been provided by "all age primaries" in the area. The new school, which was originally called Chew Magna Secondary School, opened on 13 January 1958, although the official opening by Sir James Turner, then president of the National Farmers Union was on 23 May.

The school transitioned from a secondary modern to a comprehensive school in 1971.

In 2008, the school celebrated its 50th anniversary. In the same year a wind turbine was installed at the school, and unveiled by the local MP Dan Norris. The turbine was supported by the Go Zero campaign based in Chew Magna who have also supported a similar initiative in Tamil Nadu, India.

In April 2009, ex head teacher Mark Mallett did a parachute jump from 10,000 feet above ground level in aid of a new Art and Sixth Form block which was completed in August that year.

On 1 August 2010, Chew Valley School became a foundation school. A letter to parents described the aims as "to use Foundation Status to help to raise standards and make a direct contribution to raising achievement and improve the well-being and aspirations of students." As part of the status change there was a legal transfer of land from the Local Authority to the School. The school's letterhead now reads "A Foundation School serving the whole community"

In November 2015, Mark Mallett, the school's then-headteacher, asked parents for monthly standing orders to overcome a budget deficit.

In February 2018 Chew Valley School converted to academy status. The school is now sponsored by the Lighthouse Schools Partnership.

== Academic achievement ==
In the most recent Ofsted report, in 2011, the school received was rated 'Outstanding', higher than previous ratings in 2004 and 2008. In 2010 68% of students achieved five or more A*-C (and equivalent) including English and Mathematics GCSEs. The latest (2015) Ofsted Inspection Report described this specialist Performing Arts College as a mixed comprehensive school with 1,160 pupils on roll, including 186 students in the sixth form. It said the school is popular and oversubscribed, and has been successful in gaining a number of national and regional awards. It received a "good" rating overall, down from "outstanding" at the last inspection (2011).

In March 2011 three students from the school's Sixth Form won the English Speaking Union's Great Shakespeare Debate, beating eleven other schools including Eton, Wellingborough, and Magdalen College School, Oxford.

== Performing arts ==
The school became a specialist school in the Performing Arts in 2003, which was maintained until becoming an academy in 2018. The school maintains a strong performing arts sector, putting on stage productions each term, alongside concerts, cabarets, and an annual dance festival.

== Sport ==
After numerous years of poor sports facilities a lottery grant enabled the school to build a new gymnasium and an all-weather pitch for both school and community use. This grant followed a similar grant for Chew Valley Rugby Club.

== Notable former pupils ==
- Mya-Rose Craig (ornithologist and equality campaigner)
