= Bilbie family =

English family of bell founders and clockmakers

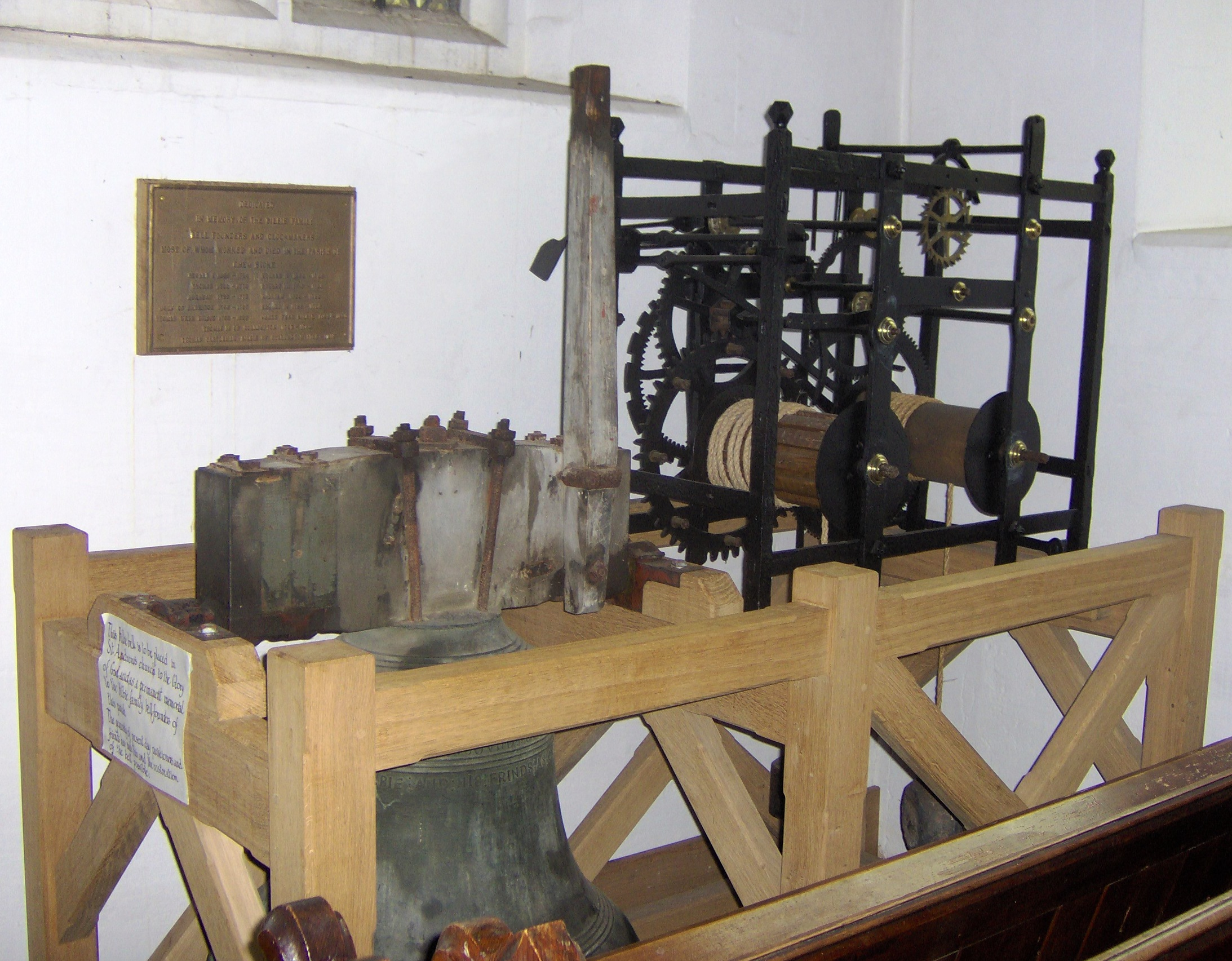
Bilbie bell kept in St Andrew's Church, Chew Stoke in Somerset as a memorial to the family

The Bilbie family were bell founders and clockmakers based initially in Chew Stoke, Somerset and later at Cullompton, Devon in south-west England from the late 17th century to the early 19th century.

Their importance to the local economy and in local history is commemorated by Bilbie Road in Chew Stoke and in the village sign.

== Bell making ==
The Bilbie family produced more than 1,350 bells, which are hung in churches all over the West Country. The oldest bell, cast in 1698, is still giving good service in St Andrew's Church, Chew Stoke.

Supplies of the tin and copper used to make bell metal were probably obtained from brass foundries in Kelston and Bristol. The metal was melted in a wood-burning furnace to over 1,500 °C (2,732 °F), and then poured into a mould made from loam, or foundry mud, from the River Chew.

== Church bells ==
Church bells the Bilbies produced include:

- St Nicholas's Church, Abbotsbury
- Church of St John, Axbridge
- St Michael and All Angels, Bampton
- St Andrew's, Banwell
- St George's, Beckington
- St Mary Redcliffe, Bristol
- St Andrew's Church, Chew Stoke
- St John the Baptist's Church, Keynsham
- All Saints' Church, Corston
- St Andrew's, Cullompton
- St John the Baptist Parish Church, Glastonbury
- St Giles' Church, Leigh-on-Mendip
- Church of St John the Baptist, Lustleigh
- Parish Church of Marwood, North Devon
- St Margaret's, Northam, Devon
- Sherborne Abbey
- Old Church, Uphill, Somerset
- All Saints' Church, Wraxall
- All Saints' Church, Wrington
- St John the Baptist's Church, Yeovil
- Church of St Peter, Zeal Monachorum

== Clock making ==
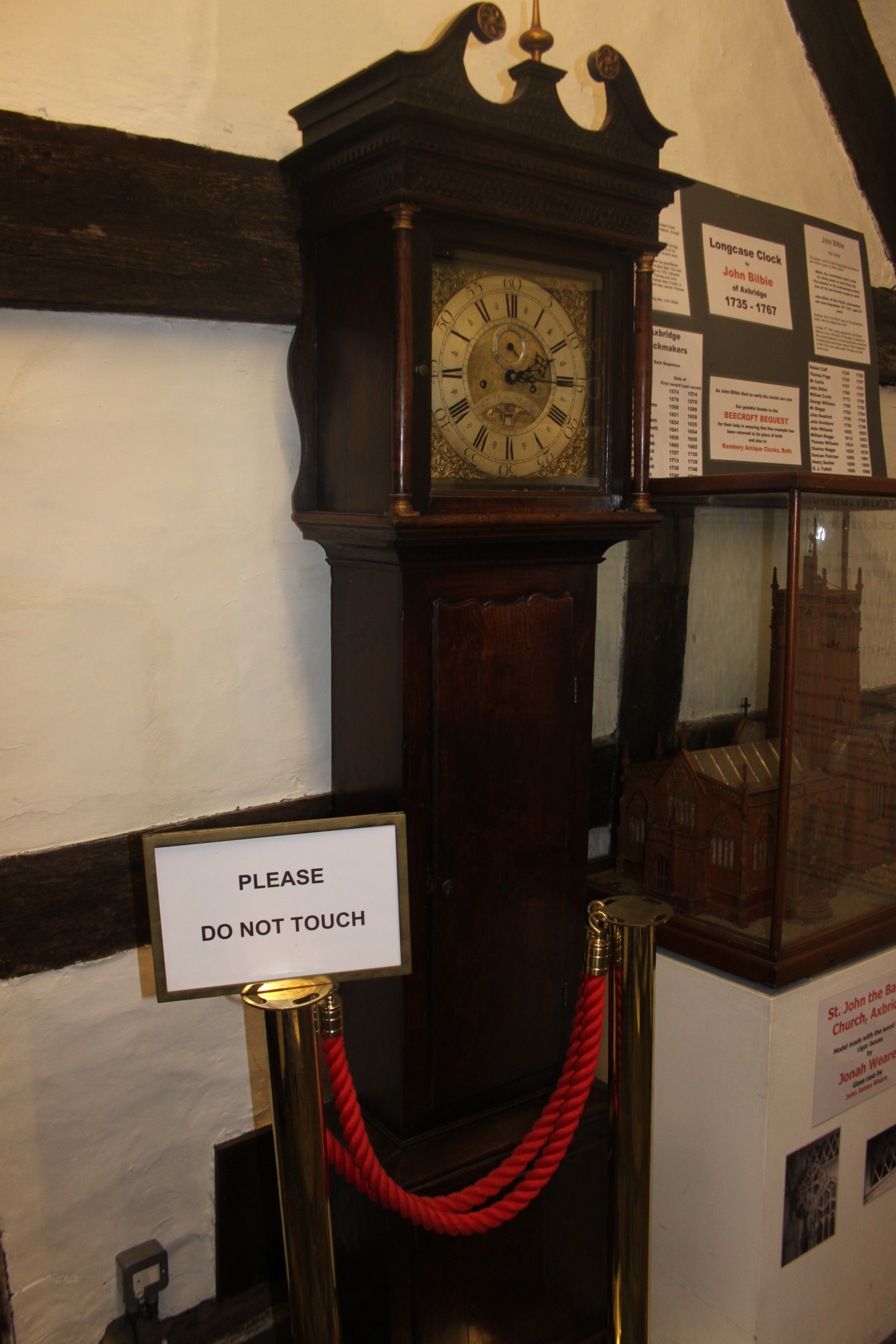
A Grandfather clock by John Bilbie on display at King John's Hunting Lodge, Axbridge, Somerset

Edward Bilbie is thought to have learnt the clockmaking trade from Edward Webb, who died in 1694. Bilbie started casting bells in 1698, and it is highly probable that he was making clocks by this time.

Around this time Bristol was one of the most important centres for clock making outside London. This was in part due to the strong brass founding industry which had developed in response to a healthy export demand and the abundant supply of the raw materials – copper and zinc – in the west. In the late 17th century the clock making industry thrived in the Chew Valley of Somerset thanks to Thomas Veale, Edward Webb and Edward Bilbie, whose clock making was conducted alongside their bell-founding work. Such a concentrated effort resulted in a distinctive local style of lantern clock.

Their clocks date from 1724 and are highly prized. They produced mostly longcase clocks, the cheapest with 30-hour movements in modest oak cases, but they also made high quality eight-day movements with additional features such as indicating the high tide at Bristol docks. These were fitted into quality cabinet maker cases that now command the highest prices.

== Family members ==
Several generations of the family were involved in the business.

=== Edward Bilbie I (1666–1724) ===
It is not known how Edward Bilbie learnt to cast bells, but it is clear that he cast his first bell in 1698 for St Andrew's Church in Chew Stoke. In the period from 1698 to 1723, Edward was responsible for the casting of 67 bells for churches all over Somerset.

=== Edward Bilbie II (1694–1726) ===
The eldest son of Edward I learnt bell making from his father, but died only a few months after him and never had the chance to produce his own work.

=== Thomas Bilbie (1702–1778) ===
Edward I's younger son Thomas took over the bell and clock making businesses in 1725, completing contracts already agreed, and traveling further for new ones. One of his largest commissions was for the "Great Bell" at Yeovil which was recast from 4,502 pounds (2,042 kg; 321.6 st) to 4,992 lb (2,264 kg; 356.6 st). In 1742 he gained a contract to cast bells for the church at Cullompton, Devon. In 1746 he set up a bell making foundry there known as the "West of England Church Bellfoundry" so that he could expand the business south and west of Somerset, and reduce the transportation problems from the original foundry. Between 1725 and 1768 he was responsible for 350 bells in churches in Somerset, Devon, Bristol, Dorset and Gloucestershire, with one in Caernarfon in Wales.

=== Edward Bilbie 1716 – 1786 ===
Edward Bilbie continued the family bell founding tradition, making several bells, including one for the Church of St Peter in Catcott, Somerset.

=== Thomas Bilbie II of Cullompton (1727–1780) ===
Following his father Thomas's creation of the second foundry in Cullompton, Thomas II or Thomas Bilbie Junior cast bells for most of the churches in Devon, providing a total of 237 between 1754 and 1780.

=== Abraham Bilbie (1729–1773) ===
Abraham took over the business in Chew Stoke from his father Thomas for five years, during which time he was responsible for 35 bells including rings of six for South Wraxall, Winscombe and Portishead.

=== William Bilbie (1730–1789) ===
William was the third son of Thomas and was in charge of the Chew Stoke foundry from 1775–1790, during which time he produced 79 bells.

=== John Bilbie of Axbridge (1736–1767) ===
John Bilbie had a workshop in Axbridge where he made longcase clocks. An example can be seen in the King John's Hunting Lodge Museum.

=== Edward Bilbie IV (1766–1796) ===
Edward Bilbie made longcase clocks which were known for their engraved decoration to the dial centre.

=== Thomas Webb Bilbie (1758–1829) and James Fear Bilbie (1763–1819) ===
Thomas and James were unable to adapt the business and compete with increasing competition. The Chew Stoke bell foundry declined, casting 25 bells between 1791 and 1811.

=== Thomas Castleman Bilbie of Cullompton (1758–1813) ===
Thomas Castleman Bilbie was the fourth generation of bellfounders and continued the business in Cullompton, casting 198 bells between 1781 and 1814.
