= The Rectory, Chew Stoke =

The Rectory
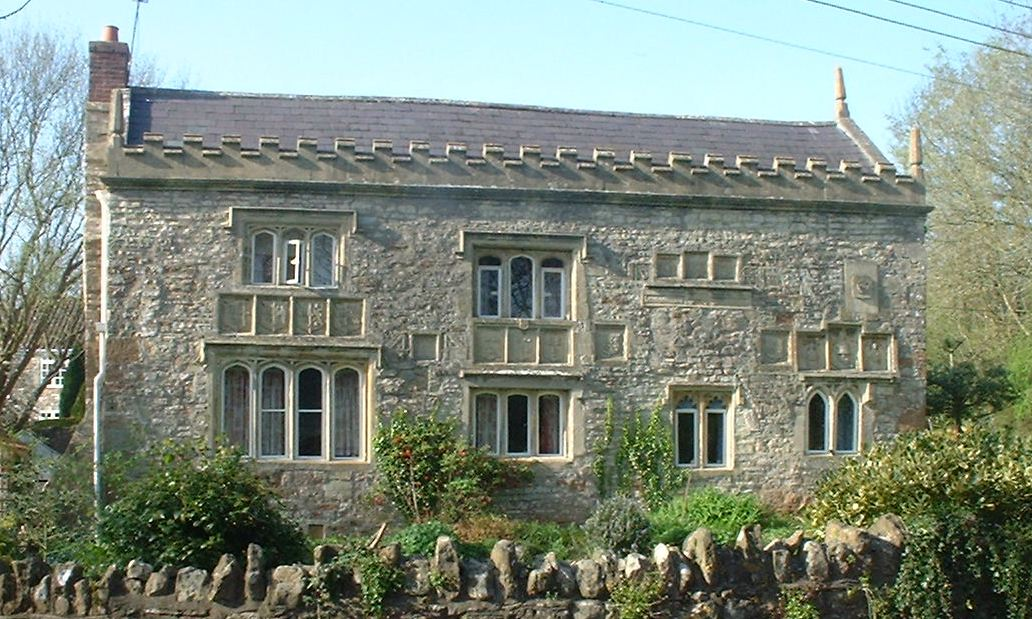
- The front of The Rectory showing the shields

- Location within Somerset
- 51°21′16″N 2°38′09″W
- Location: Chew Stoke, Somerset, England

History
- Built: 1529

Listed Building – Grade II*
- Designated: 4 December 1986
- Reference no.: 1320747

The Rectory in Chew Stoke, Somerset, England was built in 1529. It is a Grade II* listed building.

It was built in 1529 for Sir John Barry, who was the rector between 1524 and 1546 of the nearby St Andrew's Church. It has undergone substantial renovations including the addition of a clock tower for the Rev. W.P. Wait, which has since been removed and further alterations c.1876 for Rev. J. Ellershaw. The building has an ornate south front with carvings of shields bearing the coat of arms of the St Loe family, who were once chief landowners in the area, alone or impaled with arms of Fitzpane, Ancell, de la Rivere and Malet.

Towards the end of the 18th century a new rectory was built in the village and this building became a private house. In 1945 it started to be used again as the rectory. It was sold by the church in 2008 and is now a private dwelling again.
