= Wood Street =

Things called Wood Street:

England

- Wood Street, London - a street in the City of London, England
- Wood Street Counter - a small prison in the City of London, destroyed in 1666
- Wood Street railway station - a station in Walthamstow, London
- Wood Street, Bath - Bath, Somerset, England
- Wood Street Village - a village in Surrey, England
- Wood Street Mission - a children's charity in Manchester city centre
- Wood Street (ward) - London, England

United States

- Wood Street (PAT station) - a light rail station in Pittsburgh, Pennsylvania
  - Wood Street Galleries - contemporary art gallery above the station
