= Johnstone Street, Bath =

Johnstone Street
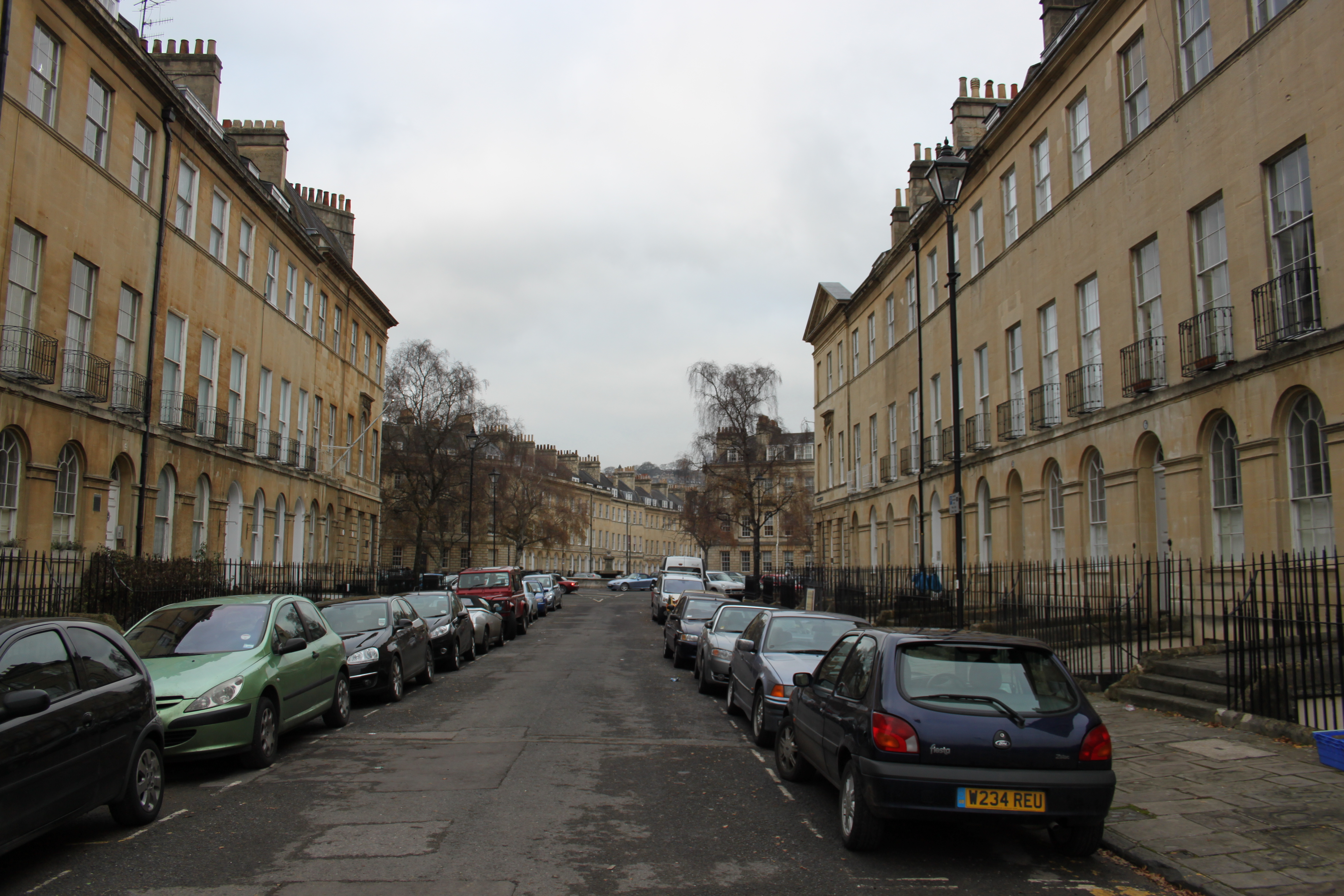

- Location within Somerset
- 51°22′59″N 2°21′21″W
- Location: Bath, Somerset, England

History
- Built: c. 1790

Site notes
- Architect: Thomas Baldwin

Listed Building – Grade I
- Official name: 1-8, Johnstone Street
- Designated: 12 June 1950
- Reference no.: 1395919

Listed Building – Grade I
- Official name: 9-15, Johnstone Street
- Designated: 12 June 1950
- Reference no.: 1395920

Johnstone Street in the Bathwick area of Bath, Somerset, England was designed in 1788 by Thomas Baldwin, with some of the buildings being completed around 1805-1810 by John Pinch the elder.

Number 1 was built in 1794 with numbers 2 to 8 being completed around 1805, with numbers 9 to 15 being completed between 1794 and 1801.

The terrace proves a consistent style of three storey houses, which complement the surrounding Georgian buildings and layout of Laura Place, Great Pulteney Street and Henrietta Street.

William Pitt lived at number 15 in 1802.

== Gallery ==
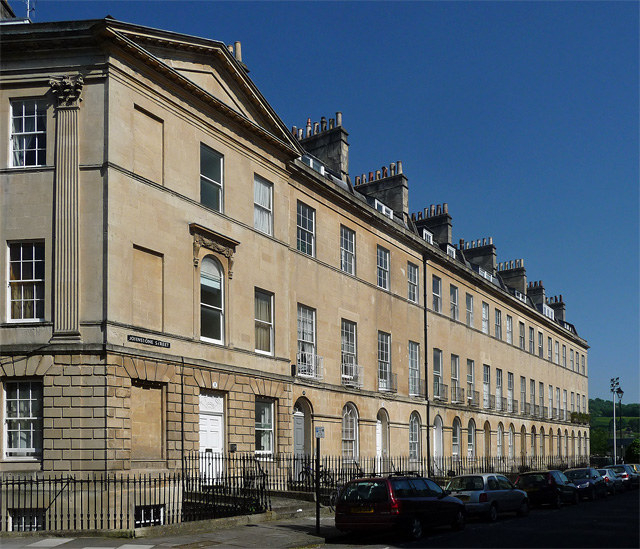
1-8 Johnstone Street

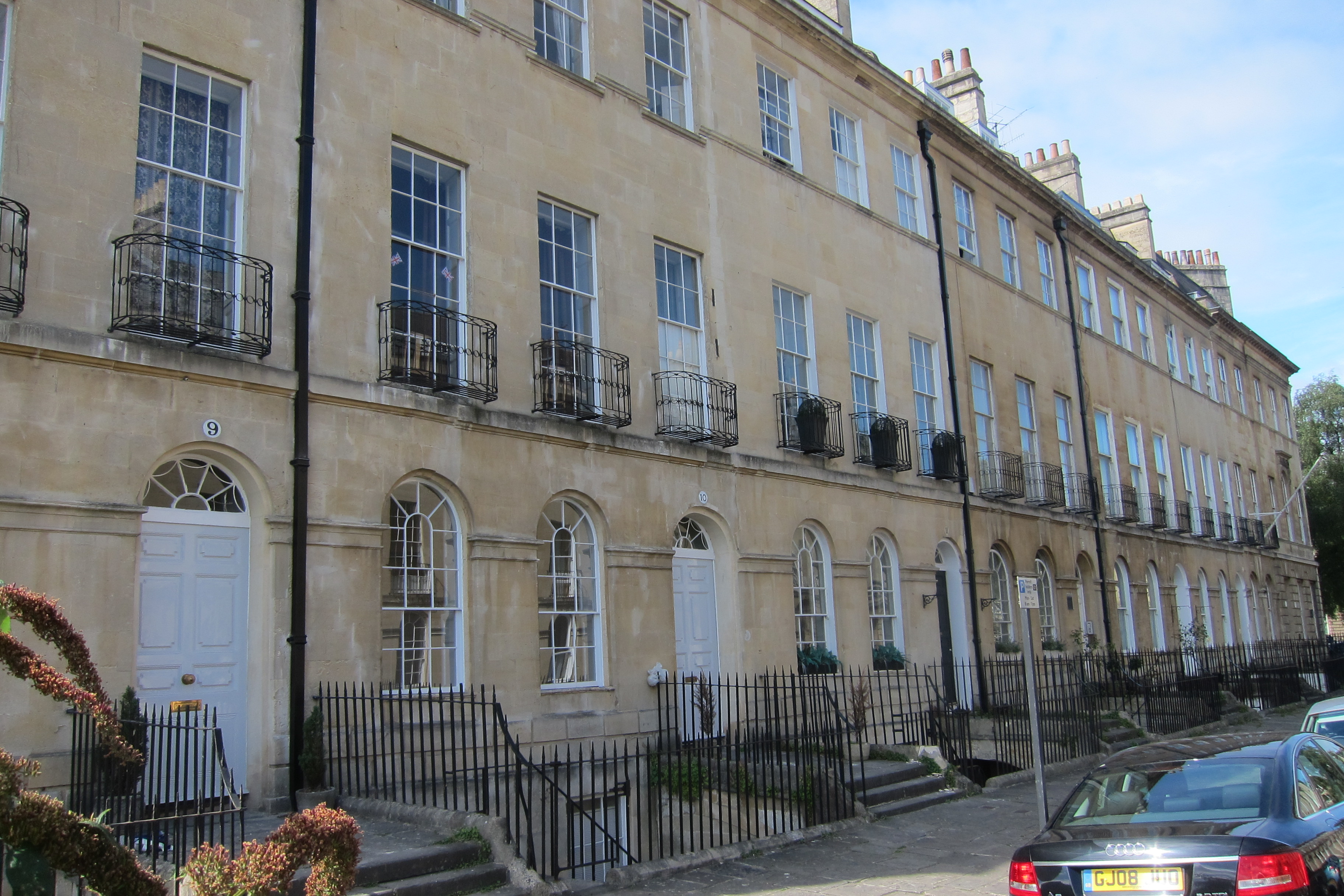
9-15 Johnstone Street

== See also ==
- List of Grade I listed buildings in Bath and North East Somerset
