= Henrietta Street =

Henrietta Street may refer to:

- Henrietta Street, Bath, a street in the Bathwick area of Bath, Somerset, England
- Henrietta Street, Covent Garden, a street in Covent Garden, London
- Henrietta Street, Dublin, a street in Dublin, Ireland
- Henrietta Street, former name of Henrietta Place, a street in Marylebone, London
