= Grade I listed buildings in Bath and North East Somerset =

Bath and North East Somerset shown within Somerset and England

Bath and North East Somerset (commonly referred to as BANES or B&NES) is a unitary authority created on 1 April 1996, following the abolition of the county of Avon, which had existed since 1974. Part of the ceremonial county of Somerset, Bath and North East Somerset occupies an area of 220 square miles (570 km^{2}), two-thirds of which is green belt. It stretches from the outskirts of Bristol, south into the Mendip Hills and east to the southern Cotswold Hills and Wiltshire border. The city of Bath is the principal settlement in the district, but BANES also covers Keynsham, Midsomer Norton, Radstock and the Chew Valley. The area has a population of 170,000, about half of whom live in Bath, making it 12 times more densely populated than the rest of the area.

In the United Kingdom, the term listed building refers to a building or other structure officially designated as being of special architectural, historical, or cultural significance; Grade I structures are those considered to be "buildings of exceptional interest". Listing was begun by a provision in the Town and Country Planning Act 1947. Once listed, strict limitations are imposed on the modifications allowed to a building's structure or fittings. In England, the authority for listing under the Planning (Listed Buildings and Conservation Areas) Act 1990 rests with Historic England, a non-departmental public body sponsored by the Department for Digital, Culture, Media and Sport; local authorities have a responsibility to regulate and enforce the planning regulations.

Bath and North East Somerset has 663 Grade I listed buildings, one of the highest concentrations in the country, covered by about 120 Historic England listings. The oldest sites within Bath are the Roman Baths, for which the foundation piles and an irregular stone chamber lined with lead were built during the Roman occupation of Britain, although the current building is from the 18th century. Bath Abbey was a Norman church built on earlier foundations, although the present building dates from the early 16th century and shows a late Perpendicular style with flying buttresses and crocketed pinnacles decorating a crenellated and pierced parapet. The medieval era is represented by the remains of the city walls in Upper Borough Walls.

Most of Bath's Grade I listed buildings are made from the local golden-coloured Bath Stone, and date from the 18th and 19th centuries. Their dominant architectural style is Georgian, which evolved from the Palladian revival style that became popular during the early 18th century. This led to the entire city's designation as a World Heritage Site. Much of the development, and many of the buildings, were the vision of John Wood, the Elder. The Circus is seen as the pinnacle of Wood's work: it consists of three long, curved terraces that form a circular space or theatre intended for civic functions and games. The games give a clue to the design, the inspiration for which was the Colosseum in Rome. The best known of Bath's terraces is the Royal Crescent, built between 1767 and 1774 and designed by Wood's son, John Wood, the Younger. Around 1770 the neoclassical architect Robert Adam designed Pulteney Bridge, a three-arched bridge spanning the Avon. He used as his prototype an original, but unused, design by Palladio for the Rialto Bridge in Venice. The heart of the Georgian city was the Pump Room, which together with its associated Lower Assembly Rooms was designed by Thomas Baldwin, a local builder responsible for many other buildings in the city, including the terraces in Argyle Street. Great Pulteney Street, where Baldwin eventually lived, is another of his works: this wide boulevard, constructed c. 1789 and over 1,000 feet (305 m) long and 100 feet (30 m) wide, is lined on both sides by Georgian terraces. Lansdown Crescent, numbers 1-20 designed by the Bath architect John Palmer are also listed.

Outside the city of Bath, most of the Grade I listed buildings are Norman or medieval-era churches, many of which are included in the Somerset towers, a collection of distinctive, mostly spireless, Gothic church towers. Manor houses such as Claverton Manor, which now houses the American Museum in Britain, and the 18th-century Newton Park, which has a landscape garden designed by Capability Brown, also appear in the list; Newton Park now forms part of the Bath Spa University. Canal architecture includes Dundas Aqueduct and Claverton Pumping Station, both designed by John Rennie. The most recent building is the agricultural Eastwood Manor Farm Steading, completed in 1860.

== Buildings ==
Name	Location	Type	Completed (Note: The date given is the date used by Historic England as significant for the initial building or that of an important part in the structure's description.)	Grid ref. (Note: The grid reference is based on the British national grid reference system, sometimes known as OSGB36, used by the Ordnance Survey.) Geo-coordinates	Entry number (Note: The "List Entry Number" is a unique number assigned to each listed building and scheduled monument by Historic England.)	Image	Ref.
1 South Parade	South Parade, Bath	House	1743	ST7525464628; 51°22′49″N 2°21′25″W	1394987	1 South Parade More images	
1 to 8 Bath Street	Bath Street, Bath	Shops with accommodation over.	1791	ST7499464693; 51°22′51″N 2°21′38″W	1394178	1 to 8 Bath Street More images	
1 Henrietta Street	Henrietta Street, Bath		c. 1795	ST7526765040; 51°23′02″N 2°21′24″W	1395995	1 Henrietta Street	
1A and 1–6, Wood Street	Wood Street, Bath		1778	ST7486964982; 51°23′00″N 2°21′45″W	1395789	1A and 1–6, Wood Street More images	
1–8 Johnstone Street	Johnstone Street, Bath		c. 1790	ST7534564975; 51°23′00″N 2°21′20″W	1395919	1–8 Johnstone Street More images	
Nos 1–41 and attached area railings	Grosvenor Place, Bath		1790	ST7608266221; 51°23′40″N 2°20′43″W	1396090	Nos 1–41 and attached area railings More images	
No 1 and attached railings	Cavendish Place, Bath	House	1808	ST7442465756; 51°23′25″N 2°22′08″W	1395400	Upload Photo	
1–7 (Consec) Great Pulteney Street, 36 and 37 Henrietta Street, 4, 5 and 6 Laura Place	Great Pulteney Street, Bath		1789	ST7532565060; 51°23′03″N 2°21′21″W	1396180	1–7 (Consec) Great Pulteney Street, 36 and 37 Henrietta Street, 4, 5 and 6 Laura Place	
1–14 (consec) with area railings	Widcombe Crescent, Bath		c. 1805	ST7572164057; 51°22′30″N 2°21′01″W	1395754	1–14 (consec) with area railings More images	
1–21, Paragon	The Paragon, Bath		1768	ST7506265352; 51°23′12″N 2°21′35″W	1394239	1–21, Paragon More images	
1 to 30 Royal Crescent	Royal Crescent, Bath		1775	ST7448365446; 51°23′15″N 2°22′05″W	1394736	1 to 30 Royal Crescent More images	
2–5 Henrietta Street	Henrietta Street, Bath		c. 1795	ST7526165058; 51°23′02″N 2°21′25″W	1395996	Upload Photo	
No 2 and attached railings	Cavendish Place, Bath	House	1808	ST7442065758; 51°23′25″N 2°22′08″W	1395411	Upload Photo	
Nos 3–13 and attached railings and overthrows	Cavendish Place, Bath	House	1808	ST7440365798; 51°23′26″N 2°22′09″W	1395464	Nos 3–13 and attached railings and overthrows More images	
6 to 21 and attached railings and vaults	Camden Crescent, Bath	Sixteen terrace houses	1792	ST7494965735; 51°23′24″N 2°21′41″W	1395191	6 to 21 and attached railings and vaults More images	
6–19 Henrietta Street	Henrietta Street, Bath		c. 1795	ST7525365122; 51°23′05″N 2°21′25″W	1395997	6–19 Henrietta Street	
7–12 North Parade	North Parade, Bath		c. 1741	ST7527864682; 51°22′50″N 2°21′24″W	1395790	7–12 North Parade More images	
8–20 Great Pulteney Street	Great Pulteney Street, Bath		1789	ST7541265112; 51°23′04″N 2°21′17″W	1396183	8–20 Great Pulteney Street More images	
9–13 South Parade	South Parade, Bath	House	1743	ST7534764631; 51°22′49″N 2°21′20″W	1394994	9–13 South Parade More images	
9–15 Johnstone Street	Johnstone Street, Bath	Houses	c. 1790	ST7534564975; 51°23′00″N 2°21′20″W	1395920	9–15 Johnstone Street	
9 to 16 Bath Street	Bath Street, Bath	Shops with accommodation over.	1791	ST7498464723; 51°22′52″N 2°21′39″W	1394181	9 to 16 Bath Street More images	
14 North Parade	North Parade, Bath		c. 1741	ST7534164686; 51°22′50″N 2°21′21″W	1395795	Upload Photo	
14 South Parade	South Parade, Bath	House	1743	ST7537064633; 51°22′49″N 2°21′19″W	1394995	14 South Parade	
16–22 (consec) and attached railings	St James's Square, Bath		1793	ST744656	1394849	16–22 (consec) and attached railings More images	
20–35 Henrietta Street	Henrietta Street, Bath		c. 1795	ST7528465124; 51°23′05″N 2°21′24″W	1395998	20–35 Henrietta Street	
23–37 (consec) and attached railings	St James's Square, Bath		1793	ST7451865618; 51°23′20″N 2°22′03″W	1394850	23–37 (consec) and attached railings More images	
35 and 36, Stall Street	Stall Street, Bath		1793	ST7501964693; 51°22′51″N 2°21′37″W	1395189	35 and 36, Stall Street More images	
37, Stall Street	Stall Street, Bath		1793	ST7501164727; 51°22′52″N 2°21′38″W	1395193	37, Stall Street More images	
40 Great Pulteney Street	Great Pulteney Street, Bath		1789	ST7559665224; 51°23′08″N 2°21′07″W	1396211	40 Great Pulteney Street	
41A Great Pulteney Street	Great Pulteney Street, Bath		1789	ST7562465186; 51°23′07″N 2°21′06″W	1396223	41A Great Pulteney Street	
41 Gay Street	Gay Street, Bath	Houses	1735 to 1750	ST7483065058; 51°23′02″N 2°21′47″W	1395837	41 Gay Street More images	
42–52 Great Pulteney Street	Great Pulteney Street, Bath		1789	ST7558165164; 51°23′06″N 2°21′08″W	1396225	42–52 Great Pulteney Street	
66–77 Great Pulteney Street	Great Pulteney Street, Bath	Houses	1789	ST7538365039; 51°23′02″N 2°21′18″W	1396231	66–77 Great Pulteney Street More images	
Abbey Church of St Peter and St Paul	Abbey Church Yard, Bath	Abbey Church	Early 16th century	ST7512764769; 51°22′53″N 2°21′32″W	1394015	Abbey Church of St Peter and St Paul More images	
All Saints Church	Wooley, Charlcombe	Parish Church	1761	ST7497768536; 51°24′55″N 2°21′40″W	1214256	All Saints Church More images	
Archway	Lansdown Crescent, Bath	Houses	1778	ST7455966018; 51°23′33″N 2°22′01″W	1394110	Archway More images	
Assembly Rooms	Assembly Rooms, Bath	Assembly Rooms	1771	ST7486765310; 51°23′11″N 2°21′45″W	1394144	Assembly Rooms More images	
Beckford's Tower with attached wall and railings	Lansdown, Bath	Tower	1827	ST7374367553; 51°24′23″N 2°22′44″W	1394133	Beckford's Tower with attached wall and railings More images	
Castle Keep in the Grounds of Newton Park	Newton St Loe	Castle	14th century	ST6940263979; 51°22′27″N 2°26′28″W	1129476	Castle Keep in the Grounds of Newton Park More images	
Chapter House of Hinton Priory	Hinton Charterhouse		14th century	ST7782959189; 51°19′53″N 2°19′11″W	1320809	Chapter House of Hinton Priory	
Church of All Saints	Publow	Parish Church	14th century	ST6234764141; 51°22′30″N 2°32′32″W	1129484	Church of All Saints More images	
Church of St Andrew	Chew Magna	Church	12th century	ST5770963236; 51°22′00″N 2°36′32″W	1129613	Church of St Andrew More images	
Church of St Bartholomew	Ubley	Parish Church	13th century	ST5294058234; 51°19′17″N 2°40′36″W	1129654	Church of St Bartholomew More images	
Church of St James	Cameley	Parish Church	Unknown	ST6102757569; 51°18′57″N 2°33′38″W	1320783	Church of St James More images	
Church of St Julian	Wellow	Parish Church	14th century	ST7418758396; 51°19′27″N 2°22′19″W	1115330	Church of St Julian More images	
Church of St Luke and St Andrew	Priston	Parish Church	12th century	ST6929060417; 51°20′31″N 2°26′32″W	1312703	Church of St Luke and St Andrew More images	
Church of St Margaret	Hinton Blewett	Parish Church	13th century	ST5942956972; 51°18′37″N 2°35′00″W	1136547	Church of St Margaret More images	
Church of St Mary Magdalene	Langridge, Charlcombe	Parish Church	12th century	ST7400869536; 51°25′27″N 2°22′31″W	1214262	Church of St Mary Magdalene More images	
Church of St Michael and All Angels	Compton Martin	Parish Church	12th century	ST5449856985; 51°18′37″N 2°39′15″W	1320751	Church of St Michael and All Angels More images	
Church of St Paul, with west wing	Prior Park, Bath		1844	ST7609762902; 51°21′53″N 2°20′41″W	1394459	Church of St Paul, with west wing More images	
Church of St Peter	Camerton Park, Camerton	Church	15th century	ST6869957438; 51°18′55″N 2°27′02″W	1129514	Church of St Peter More images	
Church of St Peter	Englishcombe	Parish Church	Late 12th century	ST7160562886; 51°21′52″N 2°24′33″W	1129441	Church of St Peter More images	
Circus House	The Circus, Bath	Houses	1759	ST7472465236; 51°23′08″N 2°21′53″W	1394142	Circus House More images	
Claverton Manor (The American Museum) and screen walls to north and south	Claverton	Museum	1820	ST7843964064; 51°22′31″N 2°18′40″W	1214609	Claverton Manor (The American Museum) and screen walls to north and south More images	
Claverton Pumping Station	Claverton	Museum	1813	ST7910464391; 51°22′41″N 2°18′06″W	1214608	Claverton Pumping Station More images	
Combe Hay Manor	Combe Hay	Manor House	1730	ST7348659818; 51°20′13″N 2°22′55″W	1115363	Combe Hay Manor More images	
Delia's Grotto in garden of No. 14	North Parade, Bath	Houses	c. 1741	ST7535064685; 51°22′50″N 2°21′20″W	1395797	Upload Photo	
Dundas Aqueduct	Monkton Combe	Aqueduct	1805	ST7845862534; 51°21′41″N 2°18′39″W	1215193	Dundas Aqueduct More images	
East wing and porte cochere	Prior Park, Bath	House Wing	1743	ST7629962960; 51°21′55″N 2°20′31″W	1394460	East wing and porte cochere More images	
Eastwood Manor Farm Steading	East Harptree	Steading	1860	ST5785555208; 51°17′40″N 2°36′21″W	1129549	Eastwood Manor Farm Steading More images	
Fountain at Widcombe Manor House	Widcombe, Bath	Fountain	1727	ST7595463859; 51°22′24″N 2°20′49″W	1394134	Fountain at Widcombe Manor House More images	
Gatehouse, 35 m. to west of the Castle Keep	Newton St Loe	Gatehouse	15th century	ST6935863975; 51°22′26″N 2°26′30″W	1136324	Upload Photo	
Gate piers, gates and boundary walls to south of Widcombe Manor	Widcombe, Bath		1727	ST7596063865; 51°22′24″N 2°20′48″W	1394135	Gate piers, gates and boundary walls to south of Widcombe Manor More images	
General Wade's House	Abbey Church Yard, Bath	House	c. 1700	ST7507864782; 51°22′54″N 2°21′34″W	1394012	General Wade's House More images	
General Wolfe's House, with Railings	Trim Street, Bath	House		ST7492364916; 51°22′58″N 2°21′42″W	1395385	General Wolfe's House, with Railings More images	
George's Hotel	South Parade, Bath	House	1743	ST7526364630; 51°22′49″N 2°21′25″W	1394989	George's Hotel More images	
Georgian House and attached railings	Duke Street, Bath		1748	ST7533464676; 51°22′50″N 2°21′21″W	1395387	Upload Photo	
Grand Pump Room	Abbey Church Road, Bath	Spa Pump Room	1799	ST7504364738; 51°22′52″N 2°21′36″W	1394019	Grand Pump Room More images	
Grosvenor House	Grosvenor Place, Bath		1790	ST7596766126; 51°23′37″N 2°20′49″W	1396094	Upload Photo	
Guildhall	Guildhall, Bath		1778	ST7512464861; 51°22′56″N 2°21′32″W	1396021	Guildhall More images	
Hinton Priory	Hinton Charterhouse		14th century	ST7775859255; 51°19′55″N 2°19′14″W	1136191	Upload Photo	
Keynsham Abbey, remains to the south of No.3 (No.3 not included)	Keynsham		12th century	ST6558468812; 51°25′02″N 2°29′47″W	1384577	Keynsham Abbey, remains to the south of No.3 (No.3 not included) More images	
Keynsham Abbey pier base in the garden of No.3 (No.3 not included)	Keynsham		12th century	ST6560068833; 51°25′03″N 2°29′46″W	1384576	Upload Photo	
King's Bath	Abbey Church Yard, Bath	Open-air plunge bath	2nd century	ST7484664803; 51°22′54″N 2°21′46″W	1395194	King's Bath More images	
Lodge of Partis College	Newbridge Hill, Bath		1827	ST7240865652; 51°23′21″N 2°23′53″W	1396315	Upload Photo	
Medieval City Wall, with burial ground	Upper Borough Walls, Bath		Medieval	ST7494164888; 51°22′57″N 2°21′41″W	1395446	Upload Photo	
Midford Castle with former Offices and Coach-houses	Southstoke		1775	ST7595561331; 51°21′02″N 2°20′48″W	1277079	Midford Castle with former Offices and Coach-houses More images	
Newton Park, the Country House of the College only	Newton St Loe		1765	ST6956664184; 51°22′33″N 2°26′19″W	1312838	Newton Park, the Country House of the College only More images	
North colonnade at Grand Pump Room	Abbey Church Road, Bath	Spa Pump Room	1799	ST7502864754; 51°22′53″N 2°21′37″W	1395195	North colonnade at Grand Pump Room More images	
North Parade House	North Parade, Bath		c. 1741	ST7530764684; 51°22′50″N 2°21′22″W	1395794	Upload Photo	
No 1 with railings, Queen Square	Queen Square, Bath		1730	ST7484265021; 51°23′01″N 2°21′46″W	1394539	No 1 with railings, Queen Square More images	
No 1A with railings, Queen Square	Queen Square, Bath		1730	ST7483965034; 51°23′02″N 2°21′47″W	1394541	No 1A with railings, Queen Square More images	
Nos 1–15 (consec) and attached railings	St James's Square, Bath		1793	ST7443365627; 51°23′21″N 2°22′08″W	1394848	Nos 1–15 (consec) and attached railings More images	
Nos 1–12 (consec) and attached railings and gates	Sydney Place, Bath		1795 and 1808	ST7560965298; 51°23′10″N 2°21′07″W	1395298	Nos 1–12 (consec) and attached railings and gates More images	
No 2 with railings, Queen Square	Queen Square, Bath		1730	ST7484565011; 51°23′01″N 2°21′46″W	1394544	No 2 with railings, Queen Square More images	
No 3 with railings, Queen Square	Queen Square, Bath		1730	ST7485365003; 51°23′01″N 2°21′46″W	1394547	No 3 with railings, Queen Square More images	
No 4 (Alfred Hopkins House) with railings, Queen Square	Queen Square, Bath		1730	ST7484864988; 51°23′00″N 2°21′46″W	1394549	No 4 (Alfred Hopkins House) with railings, Queen Square More images	
Nos 59, 53–65 (consec), Great Pulteney Street and attached lamp standards	Great Pulteney Street, Bath		1789	ST7547765099; 51°23′04″N 2°21′14″W	1396226	Nos 59, 53–65 (consec), Great Pulteney Street and attached lamp standards More images	
Nos 1, 2 and 3	Laura Place, Bath		1794	ST7526365023; 51°23′01″N 2°21′25″W	1394773	Nos 1, 2 and 3	
Nos 1–20 (consec) and attached railings and overthrows	Lansdown Crescent, Bath		1778	ST7464566021; 51°23′34″N 2°21′57″W	1394109	Nos 1–20 (consec) and attached railings and overthrows More images	
Nos. 2–17 (consec) with attached railings	Gay Street, Bath	Houses	1735 to 1750	ST7477765158; 51°23′06″N 2°21′50″W	1395823	Nos. 2–17 (consec) with attached railings More images	
Nos. 3, 4 and 5 and attached railings	Duke Street, Bath	Houses	1748	ST7533564652; 51°22′49″N 2°21′21″W	1395390	Nos. 3, 4 and 5 and attached railings More images	
Nos 5–11 (consec) Francis Hotel)	Queen Square, Bath		1730	ST7481564942; 51°22′59″N 2°21′48″W	1394551	Nos 5–11 (consec) Francis Hotel) More images	
Nos 5–20 (consec) and attached walls and railings	Somerset Place, Bath		1793	ST7440666077; 51°23′35″N 2°22′09″W	1394986	Nos 5–20 (consec) and attached walls and railings More images	
Nos. 6 to 11 (consec) and attached railings	Duke Street, Bath	Houses	1748	ST7530864657; 51°22′50″N 2°21′22″W	1395394	Nos. 6 to 11 (consec) and attached railings More images	
Nos 7, 8 and 9	Laura Place, Bath		1794	ST7533965006; 51°23′01″N 2°21′21″W	1394783	Upload Photo	
Nos 10, 11 and 12	Laura Place, Bath		1794	ST7529064979; 51°23′00″N 2°21′23″W	1394786	Nos 10, 11 and 12	
Nos 12 and 13 and attached railings)	Queen Square, Bath		1730	ST7478064933; 51°22′58″N 2°21′50″W	1394555	Nos 12 and 13 and attached railings) More images	
Nos 14 and 15 and attached railings	Queen Square, Bath		1730	ST7474264959; 51°22′59″N 2°21′52″W	1394559	Upload Photo	
18 Queen Square	Queen Square, Bath		1730	ST7474164980; 51°23′00″N 2°21′52″W	1394564	18 Queen Square More images	
Nos. 18–30 (consec) with attached railings	Gay Street, Bath	Houses	1735 to 1750	ST7480165178; 51°23′06″N 2°21′49″W	1395825	Nos. 18–30 (consec) with attached railings More images	
Nos 18A, 19 and 20 and attached railings	Queen Square, Bath		1730	ST7473665001; 51°23′01″N 2°21′52″W	1394566	Nos 18A, 19 and 20 and attached railings More images	
21–27 Queen Square	21–27 Queen Square, Bath		1736	ST7478065047; 51°23′02″N 2°21′50″W	1394567	21–27 Queen Square More images	
Nos 21–27 (consec) and attached railings and gates	Great Pulteney Street, Bath		1789	ST7548865158; 51°23′06″N 2°21′13″W	1396203	Upload Photo	
Nos 28–31 (consec) and attached railings and gates	Great Pulteney Street, Bath		1789	ST7552465181; 51°23′07″N 2°21′11″W	1396204	Upload Photo	
Nos 32–34 (consec) and attached railings and gates	Great Pulteney Street, Bath		1789	ST7554865196; 51°23′07″N 2°21′10″W	1396207	Upload Photo	
Nos 35–39 (consec) and attached railings and gates	Great Pulteney Street, Bath		1789	ST7557565212; 51°23′08″N 2°21′09″W	1396209	Upload Photo	
Nos 38–45 (consec) and attached railings	St James's Square, Bath		1793	ST7446765560; 51°23′19″N 2°22′06″W	1394851	Nos 38–45 (consec) and attached railings More images	
Nos 93–103 (consec) including attached forecourt and railings	Sydney Place, Bath		1795 and 1808	ST7569665160; 51°23′06″N 2°21′02″W	1395300	Nos 93–103 (consec) including attached forecourt and railings More images	
Palladian Bridge in the grounds of Prior Park	Prior Park, Bath		1743	ST7607663327; 51°22′07″N 2°20′42″W	1394463	Palladian Bridge in the grounds of Prior Park More images	
Partis College	Newbridge Hill, Bath		1827	ST7236565732; 51°23′24″N 2°23′55″W	1396304	Partis College More images	
Pratt's Hotel	South Parade, Bath	House	1743	ST7529064631; 51°22′49″N 2°21′23″W	1394992	Pratt's Hotel More images	
Prior Park College: The mansion with link arcades	Prior Park, Bath		1743	ST7621962887; 51°21′52″N 2°20′35″W	1394453	Prior Park College: The mansion with link arcades More images	
Pulteney Bridge	Bath		1770	ST7519464952; 51°22′59″N 2°21′28″W	1394514	Pulteney Bridge More images	
Ralph Allen's House	York Street, Bath		1727	ST7513964702; 51°22′51″N 2°21′31″W	1395830	Ralph Allen's House More images	
Refectory to west of Hinton Priory	Hinton Charterhouse		14th century	ST7778359181; 51°19′53″N 2°19′13″W	1129461	Upload Photo	
Rosewell House	Kingsmead Square, Bath	House	1736	ST7479964769; 51°22′53″N 2°21′49″W	1394043	Rosewell House More images	
Shockerwick House	Bathford		c. 1750	ST8049168613; 51°24′58″N 2°16′55″W	1157865	Shockerwick House More images	
Shops Nos 1 to 8 (consec)	Pulteney Bridge, Bath		1770	ST7518464955; 51°22′59″N 2°21′29″W	1394515	Shops Nos 1 to 8 (consec) More images	
Shops Nos 9 to 17 (consec)	Pulteney Bridge, Bath		1770	ST7519764946; 51°22′59″N 2°21′28″W	1394516	Shops Nos 9 to 17 (consec) More images	
St Catherine's Court	St Catherine		16th century	ST7778970205; 51°25′49″N 2°19′15″W	1232265	St Catherine's Court More images	
Summerhill	Sion Hill Place, Bath		1820	ST7417866243; 51°23′41″N 2°22′21″W	1394974	Summerhill More images	
South colonnade at Grand Pump Room	Abbey Church Road, Bath	Spa Pump Room	1799	ST7503664720; 51°22′52″N 2°21′36″W	1395196	South colonnade at Grand Pump Room More images	
St John's Hospital (including Chapel Court House)	Chapel Court, Bath		1727	ST7493164701; 51°22′51″N 2°21′42″W	1395488	St John's Hospital (including Chapel Court House) More images	
Terrace balustrade to forecourt, Widcombe Manor	Widcombe, Bath		1727	ST7594763855; 51°22′24″N 2°20′49″W	1394137	Terrace balustrade to forecourt, Widcombe Manor More images	
The Cross Bath	Bath Street, Bath	Medicinal baths	1789	ST7494564698; 51°22′51″N 2°21′41″W	1394182	The Cross Bath More images	
The Holburne Museum	Sydney Place, Bath		1796	ST7567765248; 51°23′09″N 2°21′03″W	1395305	The Holburne Museum More images	
The Roman Baths and site of Roman town	Abbey Church Yard, Bath	Open-air plunge bath	2nd century	ST748648; 51°22′54″N 2°21′46″W	1004678	The Roman Baths and site of Roman town More images	
Widcombe Manor and cottage	Widcombe, Bath		1727	ST7593863887; 51°22′25″N 2°20′49″W	1394125	Widcombe Manor and cottage More images	

== See also ==
- Grade I listed buildings in Somerset
- Buildings and architecture of Bath
- Grade II* listed buildings in Bath and North East Somerset
