= Combe Hay Manor =

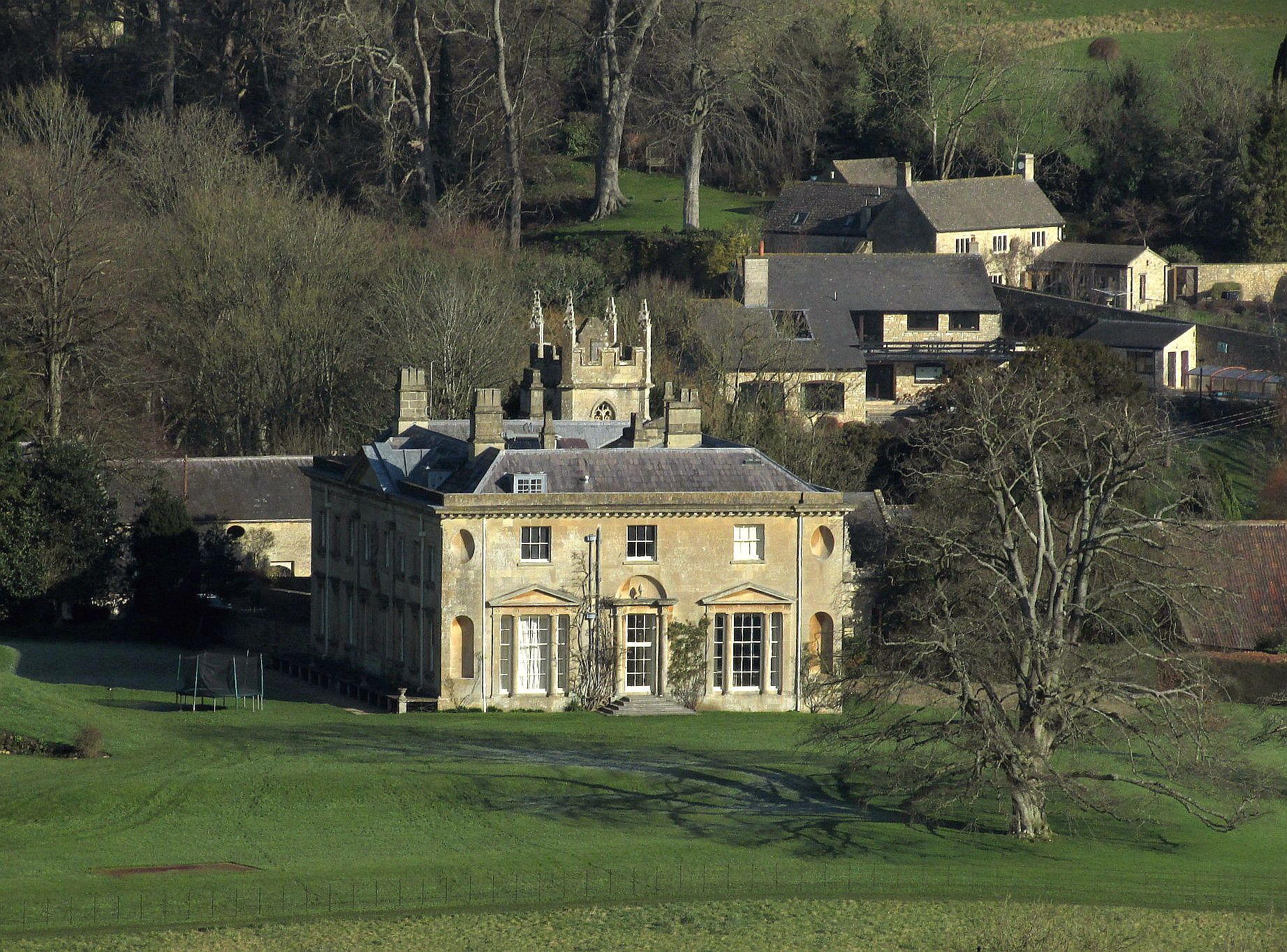

- Location within Somerset
- 51°20′14″N 2°22′52″W
- Location: Combe Hay, Somerset, England

History
- Built: 1730

Listed Building – Grade I
- Official name: Combe Hay Manor
- Designated: 1 February 1956
- Reference no.: 1115363

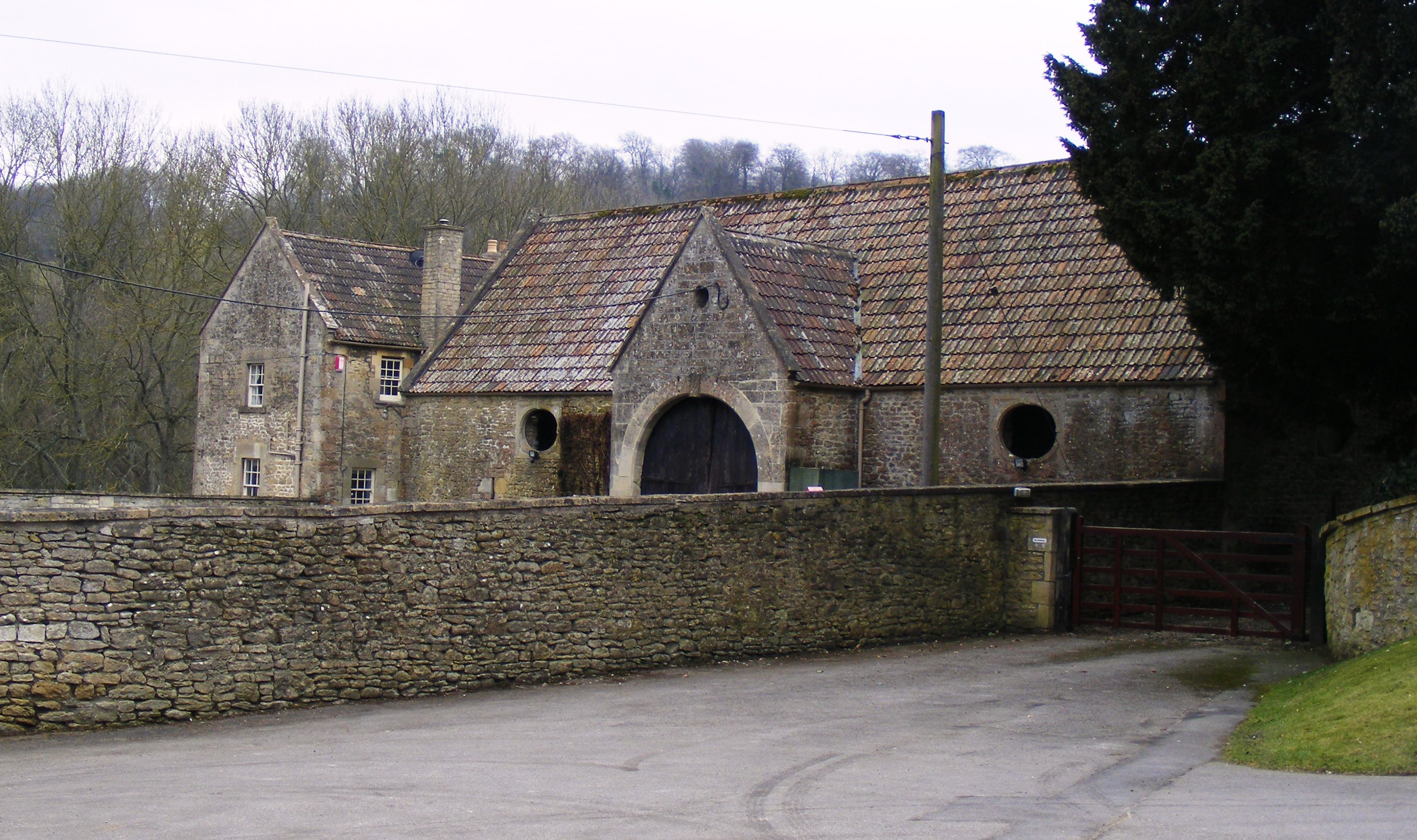
The barn associated with the manor

Combe Hay Manor in Combe Hay, Somerset, England is a manor house. It has been designated as a Grade I listed building.

The house was built in two phases for Robert Smith and his son, John. The first, western, part dates from 1728 to 1730 and is believed to have been built by John Strahan of Bristol. The later eastern and southern elevations were built around 1770 to 1775 and are believed to be the work of James Wyatt or George Steuart.

== History ==
The manorial lands occupied by the present building were given by William the Conqueror to one of his kinsmen, Odo, Bishop of Bayeux, who was later to become Earl of Kent. They were described as consisting of eight carucates of arable land, forty acres of meadow, forty acres of pasture and sixty acres of coppice-wood. Odo plotted against King Rufus who succeeded William the Conqueror, was discovered in his treason and fled to France. The manor was confiscated and given to the Somerset family of "Hawey" or "Hay", which gave the manor its name. The manor continued in their possession for several generations before passing, during Edward I's reign, to Sir Peter Stradling on his marriage to Julian, the daughter and sole heir of Thomas Hawty. The estate remained with the Stradling family until, in 1644, it passed into the possession of Sir Lewis Dyve. After several changes of ownership in a short period, it passed to Robert Smith, who built the present manor house. The present owner is William Jones.

== The house ==
Combe House Manor is a Grade I listed building, having been so designated on 1 February 1956. The western part of the house was built in 1728-1730 for Robert Smith and his son John, by the architect John Strahan of Bristol. The remainder of the house was constructed between 1750 and 1755, possibly by James Wyatt or George Steuart. It is built of ashlar Bath stone with hipped slate roofs and ashlar chimney stacks. It consists of two storeys with attics, these having dormer windows, and a basement that runs the length of the house. It is a substantial house with 3:2:3 bays on the west front, three bays on the south front and seven bays on the east front. The interior has much elaborate decorative plaster work, marble fireplaces and a number of panelled rooms.

== See also ==
- List of Grade I listed buildings in Bath and North East Somerset
