= Partis College, Bath =

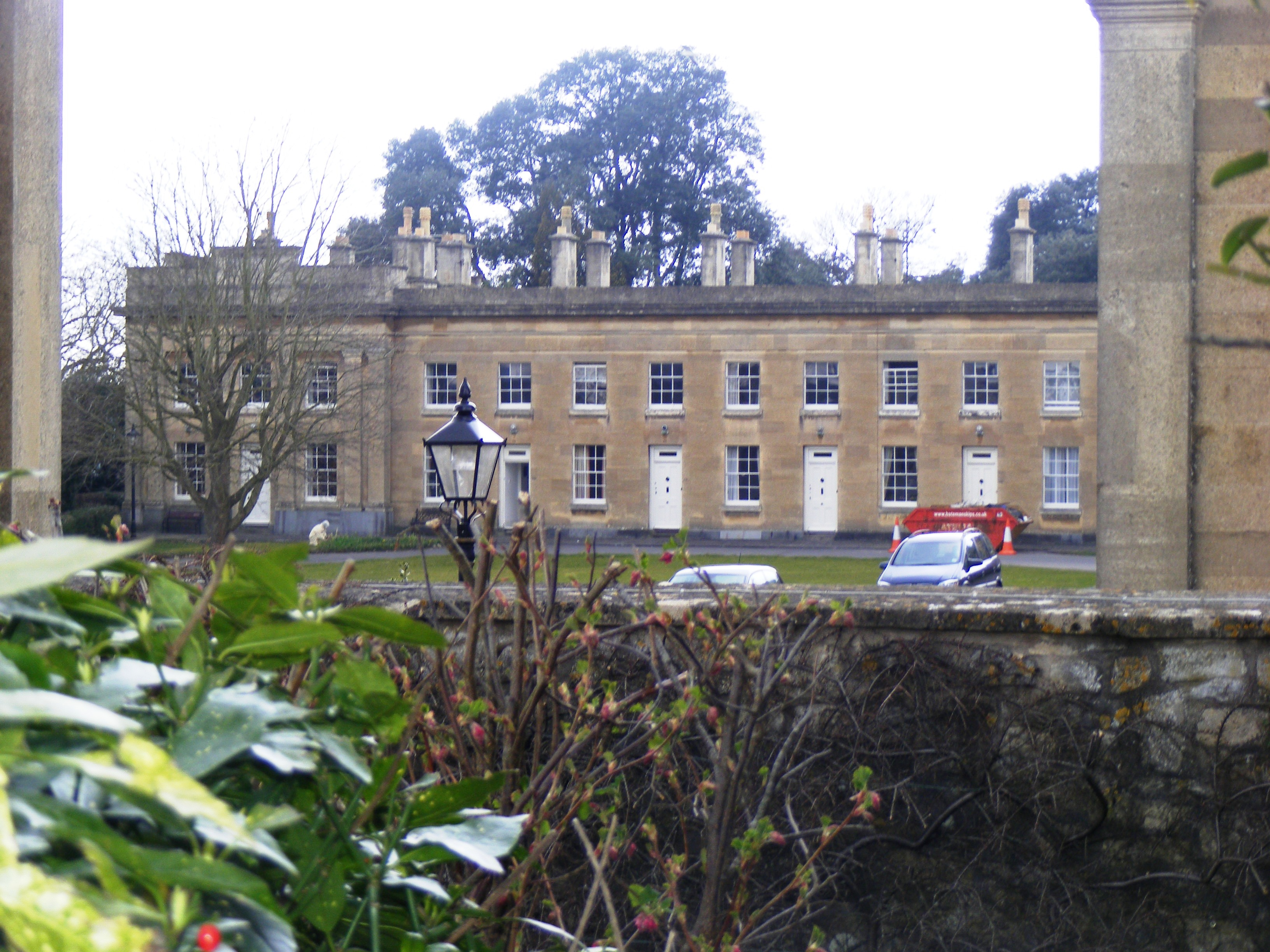

- Location within Somerset
- 51°23′23″N 2°23′55″W
- Location: Bath, Somerset, England

History
- Built: 1827

Listed Building – Grade I
- Official name: Partis College
- Designated: 12 June 1950
- Reference no.: 1396304

Listed Building – Grade I
- Official name: Lodge of Partis College
- Designated: 11 August 1972
- Reference no.: 1396315

Listed Building – Grade II
- Official name: Gatepiers and Gates of Partis College
- Designated: 11 August 1972
- Reference no.: 1396313

Listed Building – Grade II
- Official name: Boundary walls of Partis College
- Designated: 28 November 2011
- Reference no.: 1405532

Partis College on Newbridge Hill, Bath, Somerset, England, was built as large block of almshouses between 1825 and 1827. In 1950 it was designated as a Grade I listed building.

It was founded by Ann and Fletcher Partis for women "who had been left in reduced circumstances", and still provides accommodation, in 30 two-storey terraced houses set around three sides of a quadrangle, for women, aged over 50 in membership of the Church of England. Fletcher Partis was a barrister who purchased the land for the almshouses, however he died and the further development was undertaken by his wife.

The building is in a Greek Revival style. The main range has 32-bays with a centre piece with an unfluted Ionic portico fronting the chapel. On each side are wings with five apartments and beyond them pavilions. The east and west ranges each have 16 bays.

The lodge, walls, gates and gatepiers are also listed buildings.

In 1862, George Gilbert Scott redesigned the original chapel, which had been built by Henry Goodridge. In 1929 a new block was added to provide a nursing wing, after funds were given by Dame Violet Wills. In 2015 Right Reverend Peter Hancock the Bishop of Bath and Wells became the patron of the almshouses.

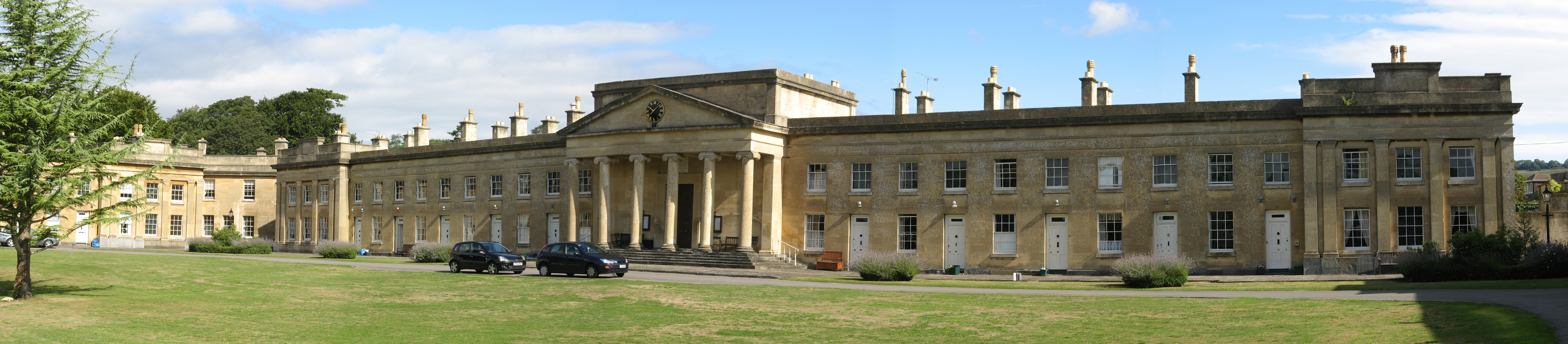
Central section of Partis College from quadrangle

== See also ==
- List of Grade I listed buildings in Bath and North East Somerset
