= Eastwood Manor =

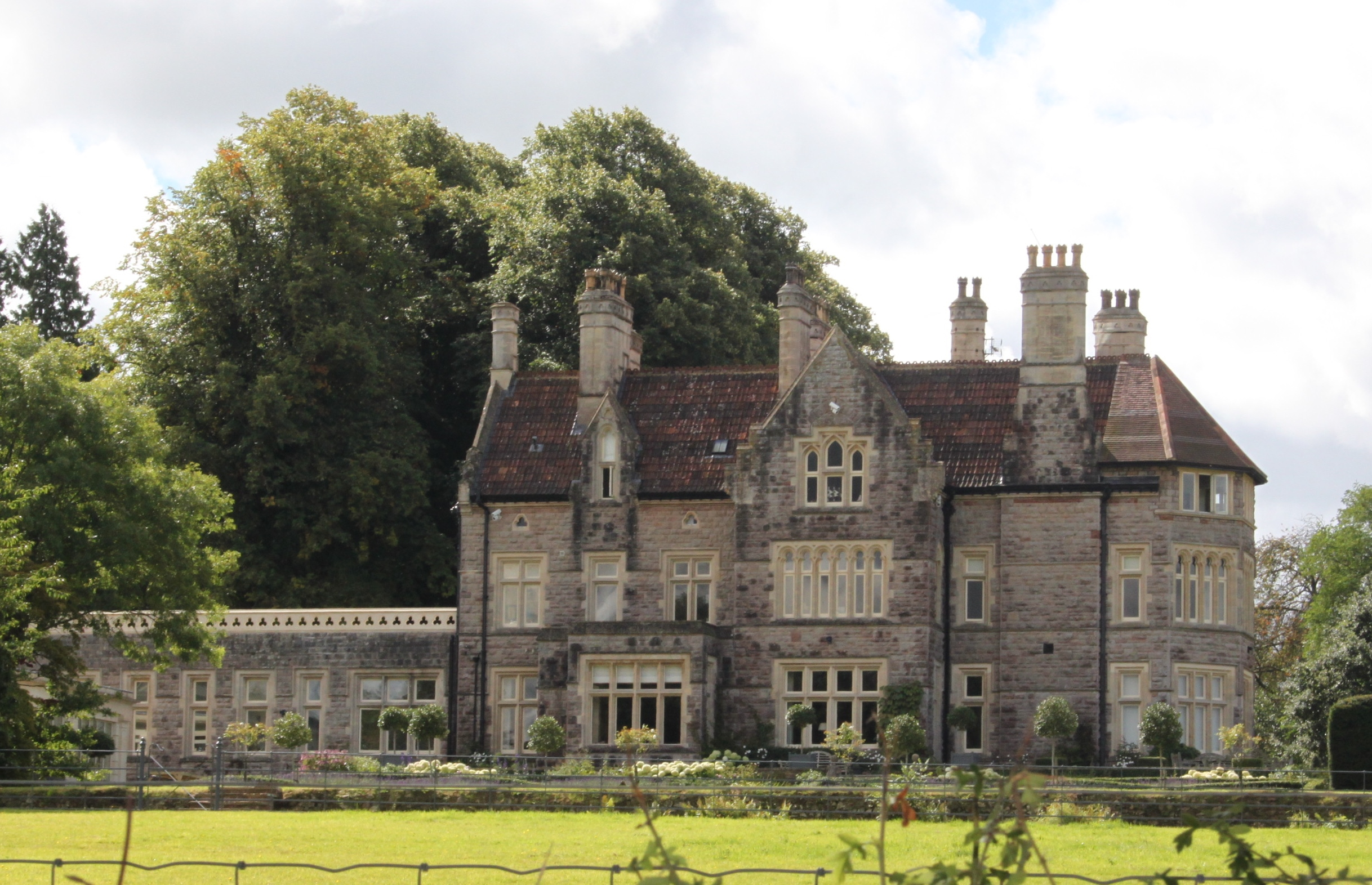

- Location within Somerset
- 51°17′42″N 2°36′36″W
- Location: East Harptree, Somerset, England

History
- Built: 1871

Listed Building – Grade II
- Official name: Eastwood Manor
- Designated: 15 January 1986
- Reference no.: 1136374

Eastwood Manor is a Grade II listed building in the village of East Harptree in the English County of Somerset.

== History ==
A house was built at Eastwood by Sir John Newton, using stone from Richmont Castle, during the 16th century, although its exact location is not known.

The current Eastwood Manor was built in 1871. It was built by Charles Adams Kemble (son of the Reverend Charles Kemble rector of Bath) who bought Eastwood Farm, including the Grade I listed Eastwood Manor Farm Steading, and used stone from the local quarry to construct the house. The quarry is approximately 100 metres (330 ft) south of the current house. It includes the entrances to two small barite or ochre mines.

In 1892 Charles Adams Kemble sold it to William Bateman Hope who extended it and installed electrical wiring, making it one of the first houses in Somerset to have electric lights. In the 1930s the house was occupied by the Wardell Yerburgh family and then by the businessman Sir Foster Robinson who died there in 1967.

== Architecture ==
Eastwood Manor is in a Gothic Revival style. The two-storey building has an attic and tiled roof.

In 2009 a swimming pool was added to the northern rear elevation.

== Garden ==
At one time the gardens covered 18 acres (7.3 ha) with 820 acres (330 ha) of surrounding farm and parkland.

The garden contains an avenue of lime trees and other mature trees, herbaceous borders, terraces and a spiral mound. There was once a kitchen garden but this is now a paddock.
