= St John's Hospital, Bath =

Grade I listed building in Bath and North East Somerset, United Kingdom

St John's Hospital
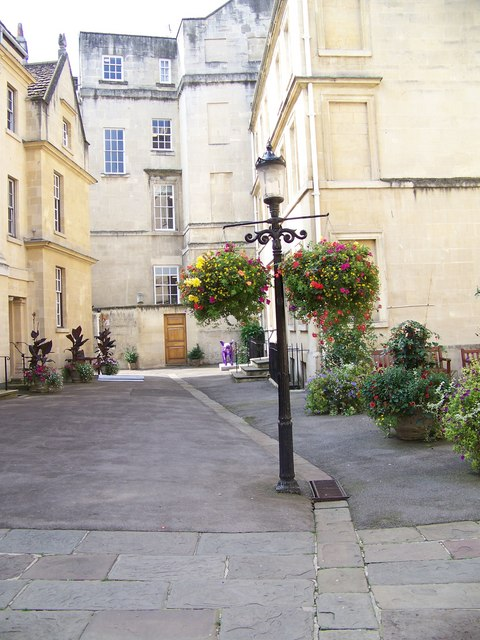
- The Courtyard

- Location within Somerset
- 51°22′52″N 2°21′41″W
- Location: Bath, Somerset, England

History
- Built: 1716

Site notes
- Architect(s): William Killigrew and John Wood, the Elder
- Governing body: St. John's Foundation

Listed Building – Grade I
- Official name: St John's Hospital (Including Chapel Court House)
- Designated: 12 June 1950
- Reference no.: 1395488

St John's Hospital was established in 1174 in Bath, Somerset, England, by Bishop Reginald Fitz Jocelin. It is among the oldest almshouses in England. The current building was erected in 1716 and has been designated as a Grade I listed building.

== History ==
The 'hospital of the baths' was built beside the hot springs of the Cross Bath, for their health-giving properties and to provide shelter for the poor infirm. It was placed under the control of Bath Cathedral Priory which became Bath Abbey. One of the key benefactors was Canon William of Wheathampstead, Hertfordshire, who gave substantial areas of land to support the hospital.

Funds were needed for the upkeep of the hospital and, in 1400, the Pope encouraged visitors on certain days to make donations in exchange for being granted remission of their sins. It was suggested in 1527 that the hospital be amalgamated with the Priory to provide greater access to its wealth, but this did not happen. In 1535 it was valued at £22 16s. 9d. After the Dissolution of the monasteries it remained independent, and attempts by William Crouch to take it into private property were defeated after the city fathers petitioned Queen Elizabeth I. During the rest of the Elizabethan era, when wealthy visitors came to the spa the almshouse provided lodgings.

In 1716 the architect William Killigrew was commissioned to rebuild the hospital. Construction continued after 1727 with John Wood, the Elder undertaking the building, as his first work in Bath, when he was aged 23. He went on to design many of the buildings which created the Georgian city.

Horace Walpole stayed here in 1765.

The site now includes Chapel Court, and continues to provide a home for over 100 of the local elderly poor. It is managed by a charity which also makes grants to individuals and organisations in and around Bath. In 2017, the charity's name was changed to St. John's Foundation.

== Architecture ==
The architecture is Palladian, which is common in Bath. The two-storey Bath stone building has a heavy ground floor arcade of round-headed arches on pillars, and retains its original window mouldings and sashes.

== See also ==
- Grade I listed buildings in Bath and North East Somerset
