= Sydney Place, Bath =

Protected historic residential buildings

Sydney Place
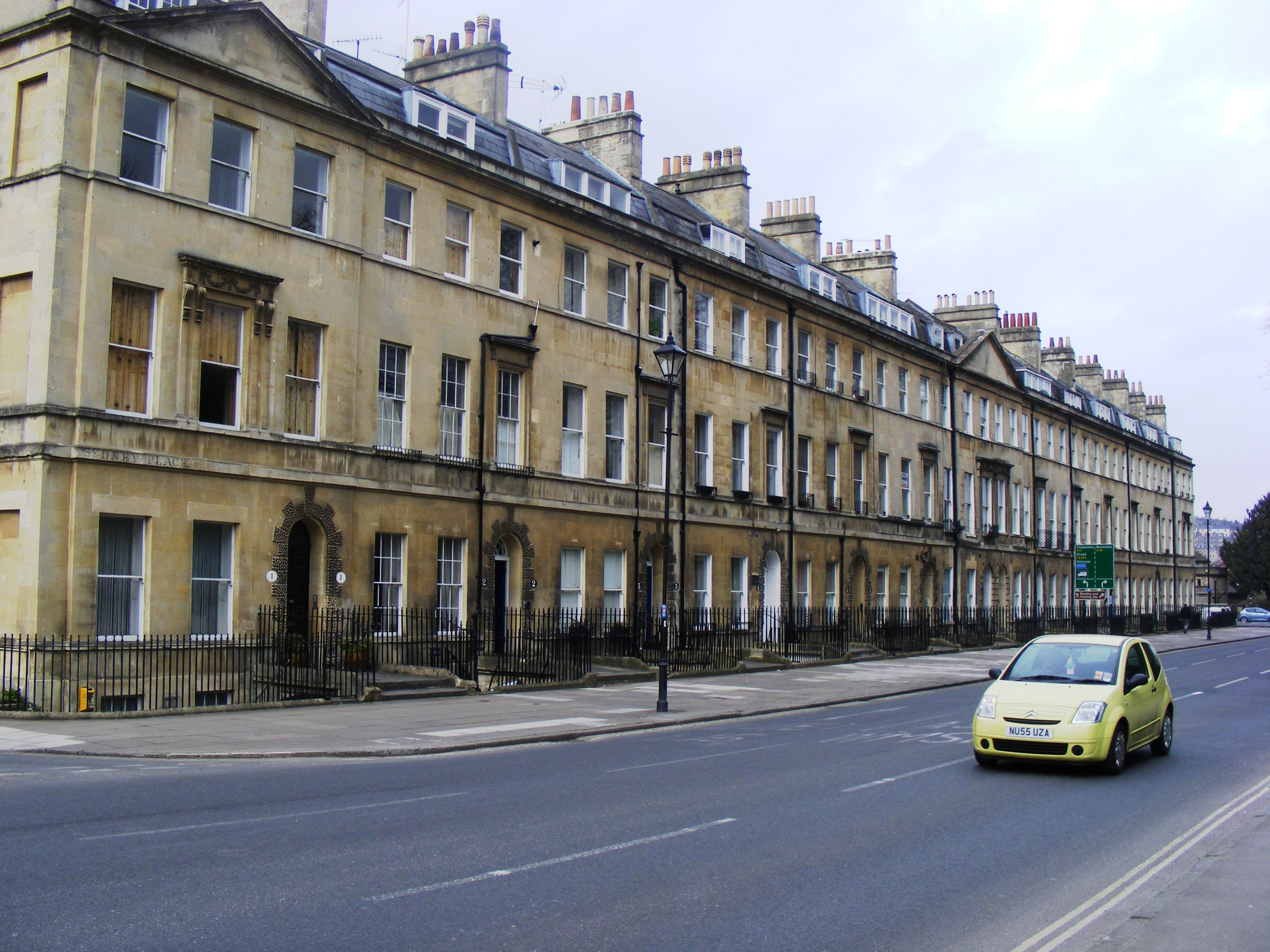

- Location within Somerset
- 51°23′09″N 2°21′05″W
- Location: Bath, Somerset, England

History
- Built: c. 1800

Listed Building – Grade I
- Official name: Numbers 93 to 103 Sydney Place
- Designated: 12 June 1950
- Reference no.: 1395300

Listed Building – Grade I
- Official name: Numbers 1 to 12 Sydney Place
- Designated: 12 June 1950
- Reference no.: 1395298

Sydney Place in the Bathwick area of Bath, Somerset, England was built around 1800. Many of the properties are listed buildings.

== History ==
Numbers 1 to 12 were planned by Thomas Baldwin around 1795. The three-storey buildings have mansard roofs. Jane Austen lived in Number 4 from 1801 to 1805.

The three-storey houses at numbers 93 to 103 were designed by John Pinch the Elder in 1808. Queen Charlotte lived at number 93 in 1817, and William IV lived at number 103.

The Holburne Museum of Art is opposite Sydney Place. It was originally designed as the Sydney Hotel, and was built by Charles Harcourt Masters in 1795–6. It is within the Sydney Pleasure Gardens which stretch from the road to the Kennet and Avon Canal.

== See also ==
- List of Grade I listed buildings in Bath and North East Somerset
