= Marshal Wade's House =

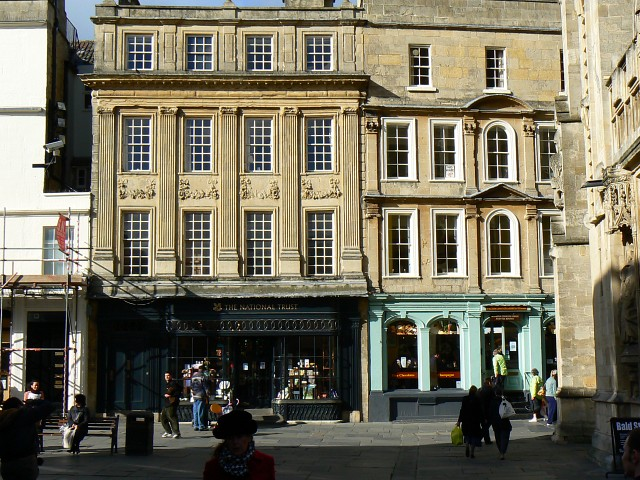

- Location within Somerset
- 51°22′53.5″N 2°21′34.2″W
- Location: Bath, Somerset, England

History
- Built: c. 1700

Listed Building – Grade I
- Official name: General Wade's House
- Designated: 12 June 1950
- Reference no.: 1394012

Marshal Wade's House or General Wade's House at 14 Abbey Church Yard, Bath, Somerset, England was built around 1700 and has been designated as a Grade I listed building.

The building was originally attributed to Lord Burlington and thought to have been built in 1730, however it is now thought to have been an earlier construction, for George Wade who was a Field Marshal and served as a British military commander and Commander-in-Chief of the Forces, as well as Member of Parliament for Bath from 1722 to 1747.

The Palladian nature of the architecture is emphasised by the 5 fluted Ionic pilasters on the first and second floors. Furthermore, the building uses standard Georgian period sash windows with multiple panes and a moulded cornice. The construction was inspired by Inigo Jones' house in Covent Garden, London.

The shop on the ground floor was an early 19th-century development which is now occupied by the National Trust. The ground floor was converted to retail use and has a Regency era shopfront which includes an elaborate fascia and delicate Regency trimmings.

The house was acquired by the Landmark Trust in 1975 who have carried out various renovation work and now let out the property. The ground floor is currently in retail use and is open to the public. However, the upper levels offer no public access.

== See also ==
- List of Grade I listed buildings in Bath and North East Somerset
