= Eastwood Manor Farm Steading =

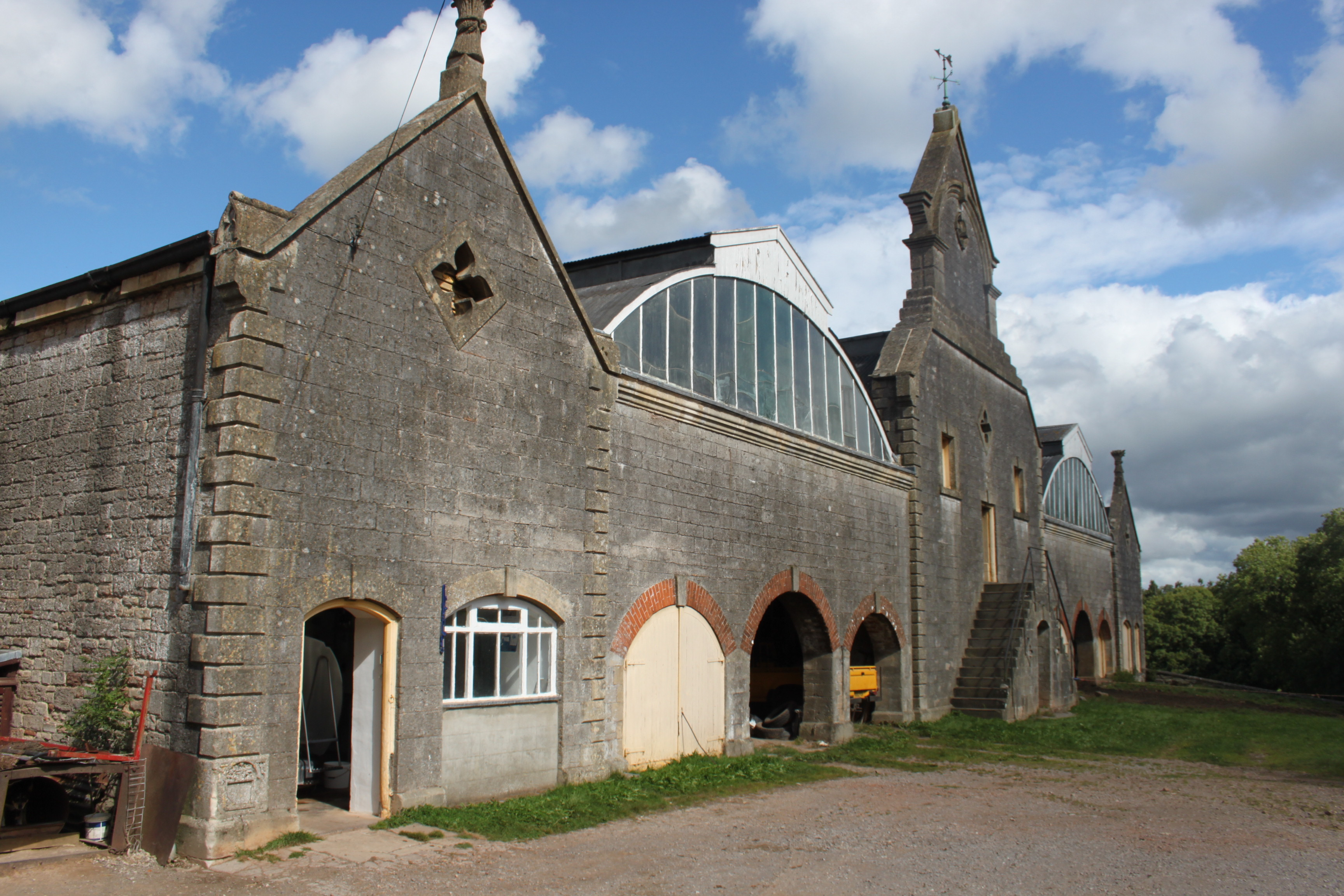

- Location within Somerset
- 51.2945°N 2.6059°W
- Location: East Harptree, Somerset, England

History
- Built: 1860

Site notes
- Architect: Robert Smith

Listed Building – Grade I
- Official name: Eastwood Manor Farm Steading
- Designated: 15 January 1986
- Reference no.: 1129549

Eastwood Manor Farm Steading in East Harptree, Somerset, England is a Grade I listed building.

The farm including the site for the construction of Eastwood Manor was bought by Charles Adams Kemble (son of the Reverend Charles Kemble, rector of Bath) in the 1860s. A series of fishponds were created on the farm by damming a small stream.

The barn covers 1.25 acres (0.51 ha) with 5 bays to the main facade. Cast iron pillars support the brickwork and wagon roof. It contained several feed stores, two bullock yards with fountains, a flax mill, cider press and threshing machine. The machinery was powered by a water mill which was replaced by steam, oil and diesel engines.

== See also ==
- List of Grade I listed buildings in Bath and North East Somerset
