= Duke Street, Bath =

Duke Street
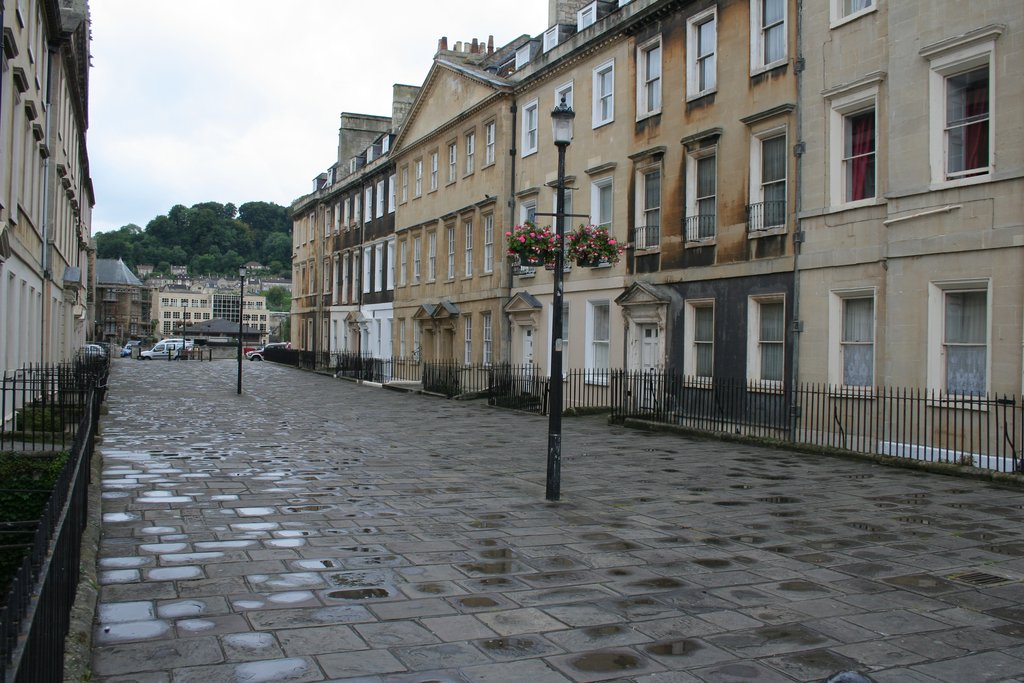

- Location within Somerset
- 51°22′49″N 2°21′20″W
- Location: Bath, Somerset, England

History
- Built: 1748

Site notes
- Architect: John Wood, the Elder

Listed Building – Grade I
- Official name: Georgian House and Attached Railings
- Designated: 12 June 1950
- Reference no.: 1395387

Listed Building – Grade I
- Official name: Nos. 3, 4 and 5 and Attached Railings
- Designated: 12 June 1950
- Reference no.: 1395390

Listed Building – Grade I
- Official name: Nos. 6-11 (Consec) And Attached Railings
- Designated: 12 June 1950
- Reference no.: 1395394

Duke Street in Bath, Somerset, England was built in 1748 by John Wood, the Elder. Several of the buildings have been designated as Grade I listed buildings. The street, which overlooks the River Avon, is pedestrianised with no vehicles permitted to enter.

Duke Street was part of a wider scheme to build a Royal Forum, including South Parade, Pierrepont Street and North Parade, similar to Queen Square, which was never completed. Wood designed the facade, of Bath stone, after which a variety of builders completed the work with different interiors and rear elevations. Many of the buildings are now hotels whilst some remain as private residences.

Numbers 1 and 2, including number 13 North Parade, are known as the Georgian House, and numbers 3, 4 and 5 form part of the Southbourne Hotel.

The last house, number 11, adjoins North Parade House, number 12A North Parade.

== See also ==
- List of Grade I listed buildings in Bath and North East Somerset
