= Grosvenor Place, Bath =

Grosvenor Place
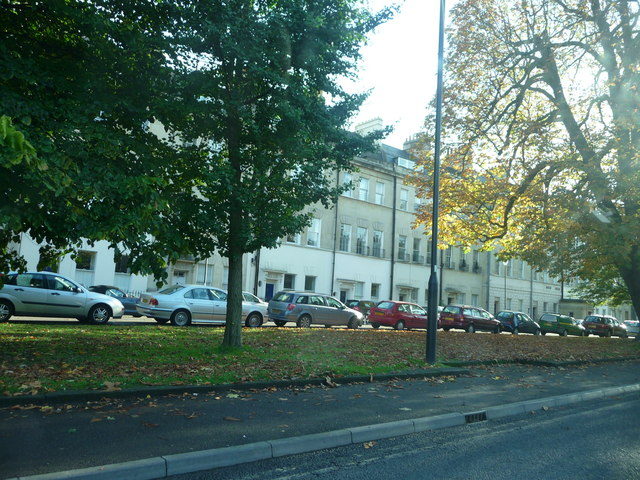

- Location within Somerset
- 51°23′41″N 2°20′44″W
- Location: Bath, Somerset, England

History
- Built: 1790

Listed Building – Grade I
- Official name: Grosvenor House
- Designated: 12 June 1950
- Reference no.: 1396094

Listed Building – Grade I
- Official name: Nos. 1-41 and attached area railings
- Designated: 12 June 1950
- Reference no.: 1396090

Listed Building – Grade II
- Official name: Grosvenor Lodge
- Designated: 11 August 1972
- Reference no.: 1396096

Listed Building – Grade II
- Official name: Grosvenor Villa
- Designated: 11 August 1972
- Reference no.: 1396097

Grosvenor Place in Bath, Somerset, England was built around 1790 by John Eveleigh. It lies on the south side of the A4 London Road and many of the houses are listed buildings.

Grosvenor House is at the end of a terrace of 42 houses (the other houses are numbered 1 to 41), with double curves to the large central house, number 23, which was formerly the Grosvenor Hotel until the 1970s and has large Ionic half columns on the 1st and 2nd floors. Number 23 then became affordable The Guinness Partnership flats. In 2020 ownership returned to Bath and North East Somerset Council, who will convert it to supported accommodation for former rough sleepers.

Grosvenor Lodge and Grosvenor Villa are two houses attached to the eastern end of the terrace which were built slightly later.

== See also ==
- List of Grade I listed buildings in Bath and North East Somerset
