= Stall Street, Bath =

Historic site in Bath, Somerset, England

Stall Street
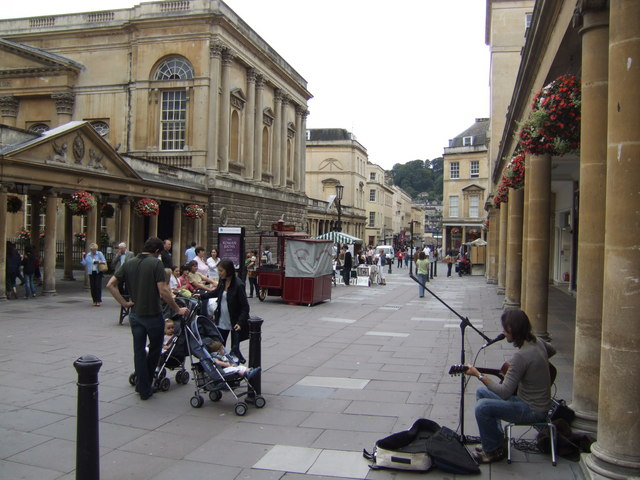
- Buskers in Stall Street showing the north and south colonnades of the Grand Pump Room

- Location within Somerset
- 51°22′49″N 2°21′36″W
- Location: Bath, Somerset, England

History
- Built: 1790s

Site notes
- Architect: John Palmer

Listed Building – Grade I
- Official name: 35 and 36, Stall Street
- Designated: 11 August 1972
- Reference no.: 1395189

Listed Building – Grade I
- Official name: 37 Stall Street and Arlington House flats 10, 11, 21, 22, 32, 33 and public areas only
- Designated: 11 August 1972
- Reference no.: 1395193

Listed Building – Grade II
- Official name: 3, Stall Street
- Designated: 11 August 1972
- Reference no.: 1395174

Listed Building – Grade II
- Official name: 27, 28 and 29, Stall Street
- Designated: 5 August 1975
- Reference no.: 1395186

Listed Building – Grade II
- Official name: 5 and 6, Stall Street
- Designated: 5 August 1975
- Reference no.: 1395177

Listed Building – Grade II
- Official name: 26 Stall Street
- Designated: 11 August 1972
- Reference no.: 1395184

Listed Building – Grade II
- Official name: No. 33 Stall Street
- Designated: 31 January 2012
- Reference no.: 1406372

Listed Building – Grade II
- Official name: 7 and 8, Stall Street
- Designated: 5 August 1975
- Reference no.: 1395179

Listed Building – Grade II
- Official name: 9, Stall Street
- Designated: 5 August 1975
- Reference no.: 1395181

Listed Building – Grade II
- Official name: 10 and 11, Stall Street
- Designated: 5 August 1975
- Reference no.: 1395182

Stall Street in Bath, Somerset, England was built by John Palmer between the 1790s and the first decade of the 19th century. The buildings which form an architectural group have listed building status and are now occupied by shops and offices.

The street includes the side of the Grand Pump Room and the attached north and south colonnades. Number 3 Stall Street has the north colonnade attached and is on the corner of Abbey Church Yard and continuous with those buildings. The fountain which stood opposite them has now been moved to Terrace Walk opposite Parade Gardens.

Numbers 5 to 11 were built between 1805 and 1810. Numbers 5 and 6 balance numbers 10 and 11 with giant pilasters which rise up to the second floor.

Numbers 27 to 29 were built around 1820 and form a corner block with buildings in Beau Street. Number 29 has a shop front dating from around 1900 with the others being more recent.

Number 33 is a three-storey building; it was built around 1800 and has a first floor display window installed around 1900 and a shop front from around 1990.

Numbers 35 and 36 are on the corner of Bath Street and are consistent with those buildings including the Ionic columns and have been designated as Grade I listed buildings.

Number 37, which forms part of Arlington House, is also Grade I listed.

== Gallery ==
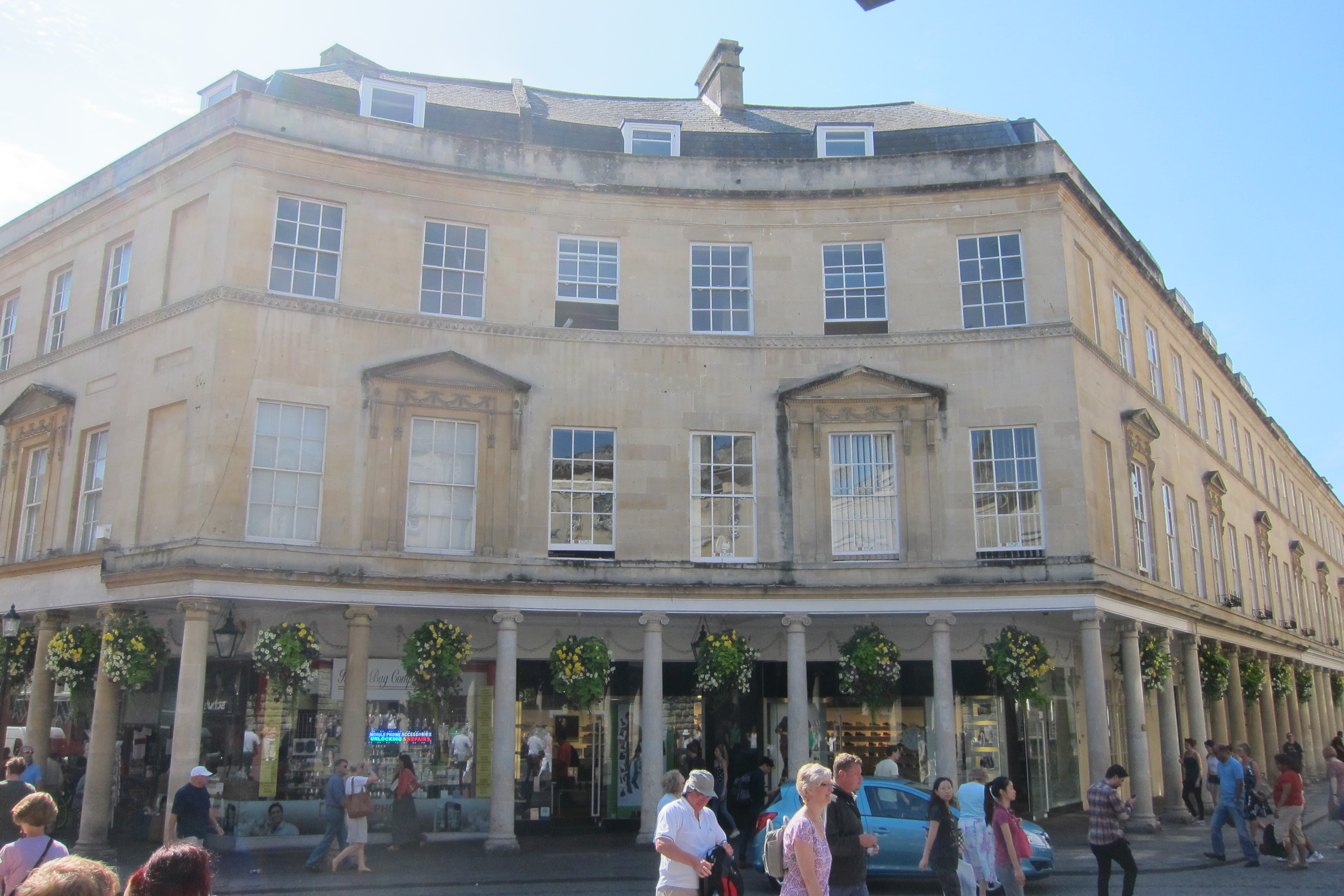
35 and 36, Stall Street

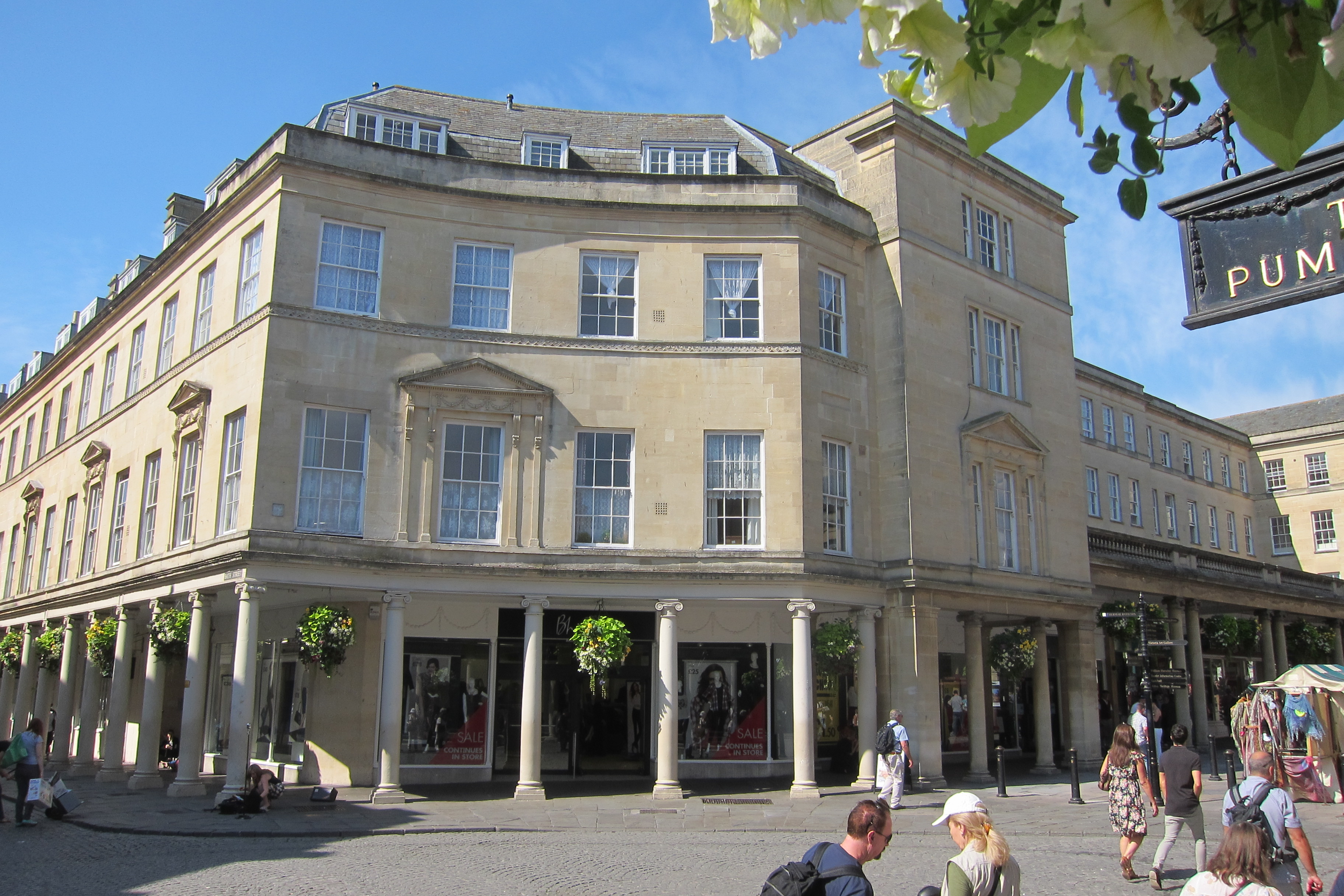
37, Stall Street

== See also ==
- List of Grade I listed buildings in Bath and North East Somerset
