= Donald Insall Associates =

British firm of architects, designers, and historic building consultants

Practice information
- Founded: 1958
- Location: London, Bath, Birmingham, Cambridge, Chester, Conwy, Manchester, Oxford, York

Significant works and honors
- Buildings: Windsor Castle post-fire restoration Palace of Westminster; Westminster Hall; Chester Cathedral; Cardiff Castle; Hotel Café Royal; Regent Street Conservation Plan; Trinity College, Cambridge; Hampton Court Palace
- Awards: Over 200, notably: The RIBA Building of the Year, Wales (2014); The RIBA Award for Architecture for Windsor Castle (1998); Europa Nostra Medals of Honour (in 1983, 1989, 1999, 2000 and 2006)

Website
- dia.co.uk

Donald Insall Associates is a firm of architects, designers and historic building consultants in the United Kingdom.

They have worked on contemporary and historic listed buildings, monuments and sites throughout Britain, and at UNESCO World Heritage Sites including The Palace of Westminster, Cross Bath, the Tower of London, Kew Gardens and Caernarfon Castle. They were involved in the restoration of Windsor Castle following the 1992 fire. They have worked extensively in the adaptive re-use of historic buildings, contemporary interventions and new design.

Sir Donald Insall founded the company during 1958 and was chairman until 1998. He continued to act as a consultant until his death in 2026. They continue to operate according to the methodology and philosophy established by Insall, as outlined in his 2008 book, Living Buildings.

They have won over 200 awards for their work, including twice-winning the Europa Nostra UK Medal of Honour, as well as the 2014 RIBA Building of the Year, Wales, for the Copper Kingdom project at Amlwch, Anglesey.

Donald Insall Associates are now majority employee-owned and work from seven UK locations, as well as working internationally as both architects and consultants. Their principal office is at 12 Devonshire Street, London. They currently have branches in Bath, Birmingham, Chester, Manchester, Oxford, Conwy and York. In 2015 they were ranked number 39 in the Architects' Journal AJ120 list of largest practices in the UK.

== Major projects ==
Major projects include:

=== Public and institutional ===
- The Palace of Westminster, London
  - Westminster Hall
  - House of Lords Chamber
  - Cloister Court and the Pugin-designed Courtyards
  - The Encaustic tile floors
  - Sovereign's Robing Room
  - The Pugin Room
- The Tower of London, London
- Hampton Court Palace, London
- Goldsmiths' Hall, London
- The Banqueting House, Whitehall
- Cross Bath Spa, Bath
- Lincoln's Inn Great Hall
- Mansion House, London
- Liverpool Town Hall
- Lord's Cricket Ground, London
- Cardiff Castle, South Wales
- Caernarfon Castle, Gwynedd, North Wales
- Hotel Café Royal, Regent Street, London
- The former Regent Palace Hotel, Regent Street, London
- Kew Palace, London

=== Arts: museums, galleries and libraries ===
- Somerset House, London
  - Major refurbishment of the South Building, incorporating a new gallery and restored Seamen's Hall, and repaving and fountains in the courtyard.
- Staircase House, Stockport
- Battle Abbey Gatehouse, Kent
- The Kew Pagoda, Temperate House and the Marianne North Gallery, Kew Gardens, London
- Kew Palace, Kew, London
- Bluecoat School, Liverpool

=== Religious buildings and sites ===
- Chester Cathedral, Cheshire
- Bangor Cathedral, Bangor, North Wales
- Pembroke College Chapel, Cambridge University, Cambridge

=== Educational ===
- Wren Library, Trinity College, Cambridge
- Stephen Hawking Building, Gonville and Caius College, Cambridge
- Performing Arts Centre, Woldingham School
- Codrington Library, New College, Oxford
- Cockerell Building, Cambridge:
- Bangor University Arts Building, North Wales

== Research and education ==
=== Publications ===
Donald Insall Associates' members publish regularly. Major publications by the firm include:

- The Care of Old Buildings Today
- Living Buildings – Architectural Conservation: Philosophy, Principles and Practice.
- Chester: A Study in Conservation

=== Academic activities ===
Donald Insall Associates lecture at specialist conferences in Europe, the Americas and Far East. They have lectured regularly at

- Royal College of Arts
- International Centre for Conservation, Rome University
- Catholic University of Leuven, Belgium
- College d'Europe in Bruges.
- Canterbury University
