= All Saints' Church, Woolley =

Church in Somerset, England

All Saints' Church
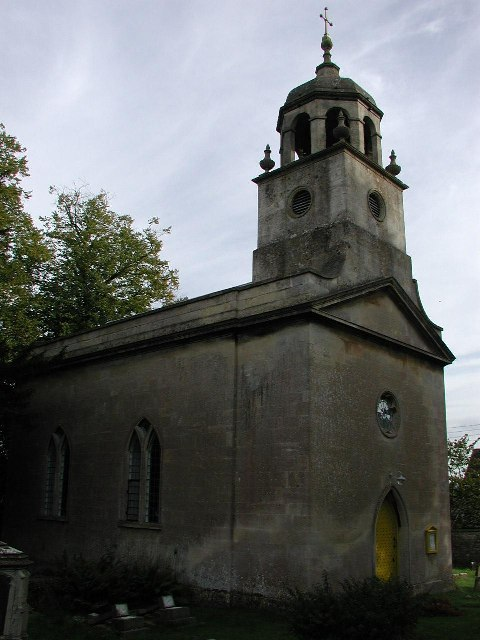

- Location within Somerset
- 51°24′55″N 2°21′41″W
- Location: Woolley, Charlcombe, Somerset, England

History
- Built: 1761

Site notes
- Architect: John Wood, the Younger

Listed Building – Grade I
- Official name: Church of All Saints
- Designated: 1 February 1956
- Reference no.: 1214256

All Saints' Church at Woolley in the parish of Charlcombe, Somerset, England, dates from 1761 and was built by John Wood, the Younger replacing an earlier church on the site. It is a Grade I listed building.

The church has a nave and apsidal sanctuary topped by a small bell tower with an octagonal cupola. The pews were brought in from another church in Bath to replace the original box pews in 1903.

Within the church is a plaque giving thanks for the safe return of all 13 men from the village who fought in World War I and 15 in World War II, making it one of the Doubly Thankful villages.

From the 1970s to 1990s the church underwent significant restoration funded by local residents and the Friends of Woolley Church.

The parish is part of the benefice of Bath St Saviour with Swainswick and Woolley, within the deanery of Bath.

== See also ==
- Grade I listed buildings in Bath and North East Somerset
- List of Somerset towers
