= Cavendish Place, Bath =

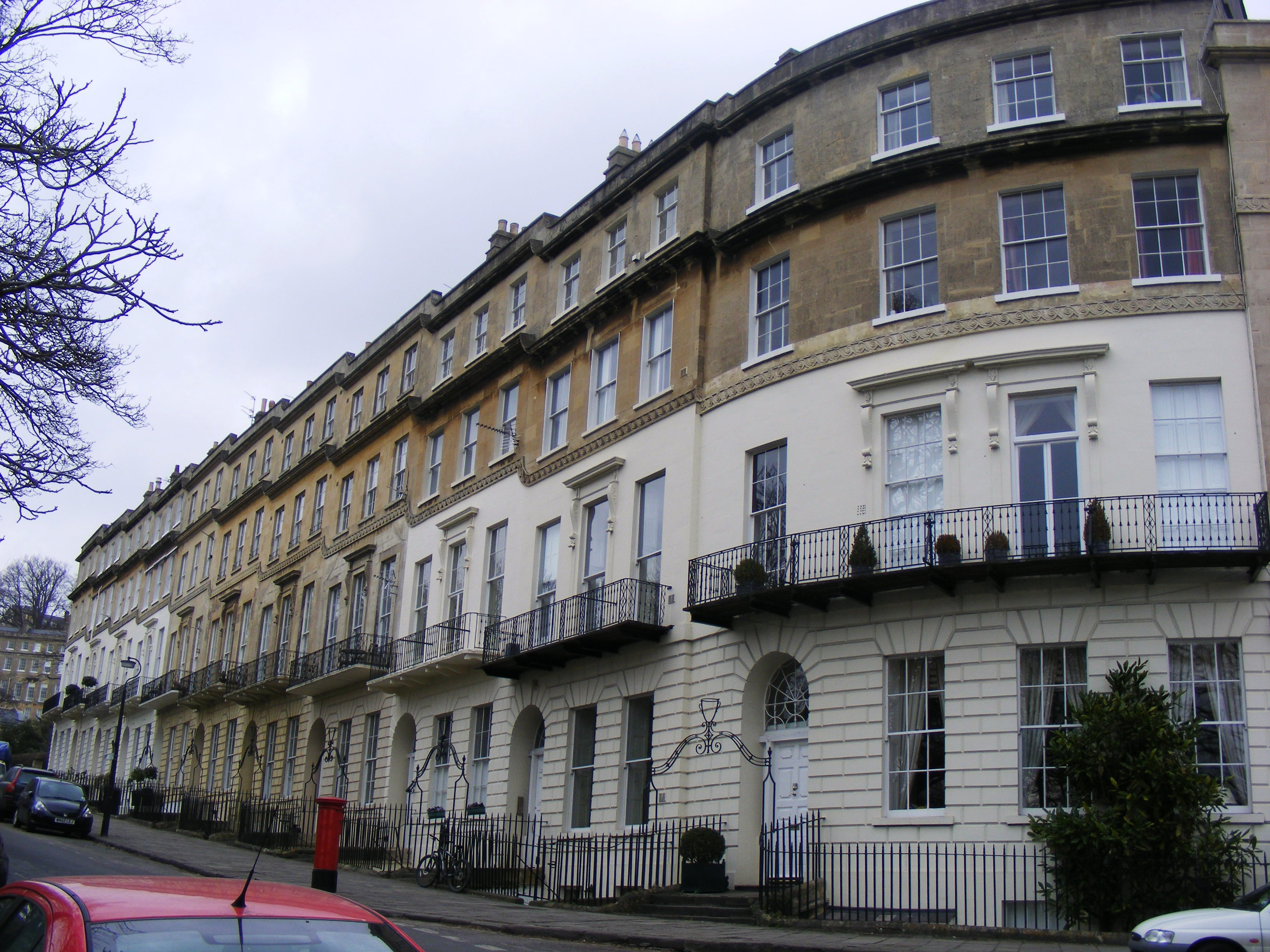

- Location within Somerset
- 51°23′25″N 2°22′07″W
- Location: Bath, Somerset, England

History
- Built: 1808

Site notes
- Architect: John Pinch the elder
- Architectural style: Georgian

Listed Building – Grade I
- Official name: No 1 and attached railings
- Designated: 12 June 1950
- Reference no.: 1395400

Listed Building – Grade I
- Official name: No 2 and attached railings
- Designated: 12 June 1950
- Reference no.: 1395411

Listed Building – Grade I
- Official name: Nos.3-13 (Consec) and attached railings and overthrows
- Designated: 12 June 1950
- Reference no.: 1395464

Cavendish Place is a Georgian terrace in Bath, Somerset, England. It was built in between 1808 and 1816 by John Pinch the elder. Numbers 1 to 13 have been designated as Grade I listed buildings.

== Description ==
Nos. 1 and 2 are a continuation of Park Place, which faces south. No. 3 has a curved front, linking Nos. 1–2 to the rest of the terrace, which continues northwards, facing west. The houses in Park Place are smaller than Nos. 3-13 of Cavendish Place, so Pinch made No. 2 slightly shorter than No. 3 and No. 1 slightly shorter than No. 2, to avoid a sudden change in height between the two terraces.

Each building has 4 storeys plus a basement and rises 2 feet (61 cm) as the terrace climbs up the hill. To give visual continuity along the stepping terrace, the platband and the cornice are ramped up at the end of each house, instead of abruptly breaking and restarting at each step. This technique was used by Pinch at various sloping sites in Bath.

Unusually for a Bath terrace, some of the houses have painted exteriors. In other parts of the country, Georgian houses were painted, but Bath stone was usually considered presentable enough without paint.

== Bombing and reconstruction ==
In 1942 Nos. 6-9 were severely damaged by incendiary bombs. These houses were repaired in 1949.

== See also ==
- List of Grade I listed buildings in Bath and North East Somerset
