= South Parade, Bath =

South Parade
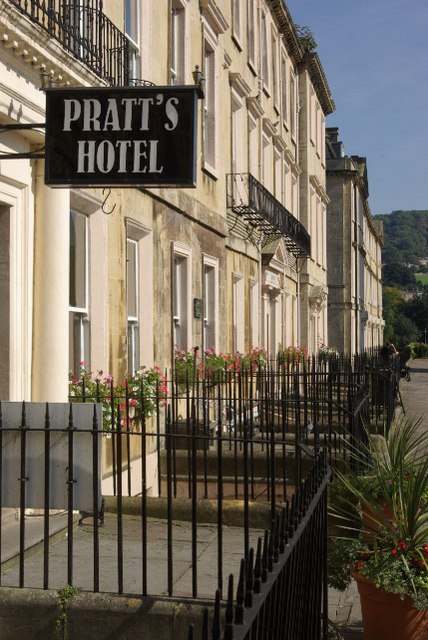

- Location within Somerset
- 51°22′47.8″N 2°21′22.3″W
- Location: Bath, Somerset, England

History
- Built: 1743

Site notes
- Architect: John Wood, the Elder
- Architectural style: Georgian

Listed Building – Grade I
- Official name: 1, South Parade
- Designated: 12 June 1950
- Reference no.: 1394987

Listed Building – Grade I
- Official name: George's Hotel
- Designated: 12 June 1950
- Reference no.: 1394989

Listed Building – Grade I
- Official name: Pratt's Hotel
- Designated: 12 June 1950
- Reference no.: 1394992

Listed Building – Grade I
- Official name: 9-13, South Parade
- Designated: 12 June 1950
- Reference no.: 1394994

Listed Building – Grade I
- Official name: 14, South Parade
- Designated: 12 June 1950
- Reference no.: 1394995

Listed Building – Grade II
- Official name: Retaining Wall at East End and Whitehall Stairs
- Designated: 15 October 2010
- Reference no.: 1394996

South Parade in Bath, Somerset, England, is a historic terrace built around 1743 by John Wood, the Elder. All of the houses have been designated as Grade I listed buildings.

South Parade was part of a wider scheme to build a Royal Forum, including North Parade, Pierrepont and Duke Streets, similar to Queen Square, which was never completed. Wood designed the facade, of Bath stone, after which a variety of builders completed the work with different interiors and rear elevations. Many of the buildings are now hotels and restaurants whilst some remain private residences. The area which Wood envisaged as an area of sunken gardens matching the houses is now a car park.

Numbers 1, 2 and 3 (which is now the Halcyon Hotel and now includes Circo Bar and Lounge nightclub) and numbers 4 to 8 (which became the 46 room Pratt's Hotel) form a 3-storey terrace with a double break at the centre. There is a central pediment and balustraded parapet and the central door has Ionic columns. Number 6 was associated with Sir Walter Scott in 1775.

Numbers 9 to 13 became the Southbourne Hotel and is now divided into flats. Number 12 was associated with John Hunter FRS in 1785. Number 14, which was associated with Fanny Burney in 1780, is the end of terrace and next to the River Avon.

On the southern side of the road is the Roman Catholic St John's Church, which was designed and built between 1861 and 1863 by Charles Francis Hansom who added the 222 foot (68 metre) spire in 1867.

== Gallery ==
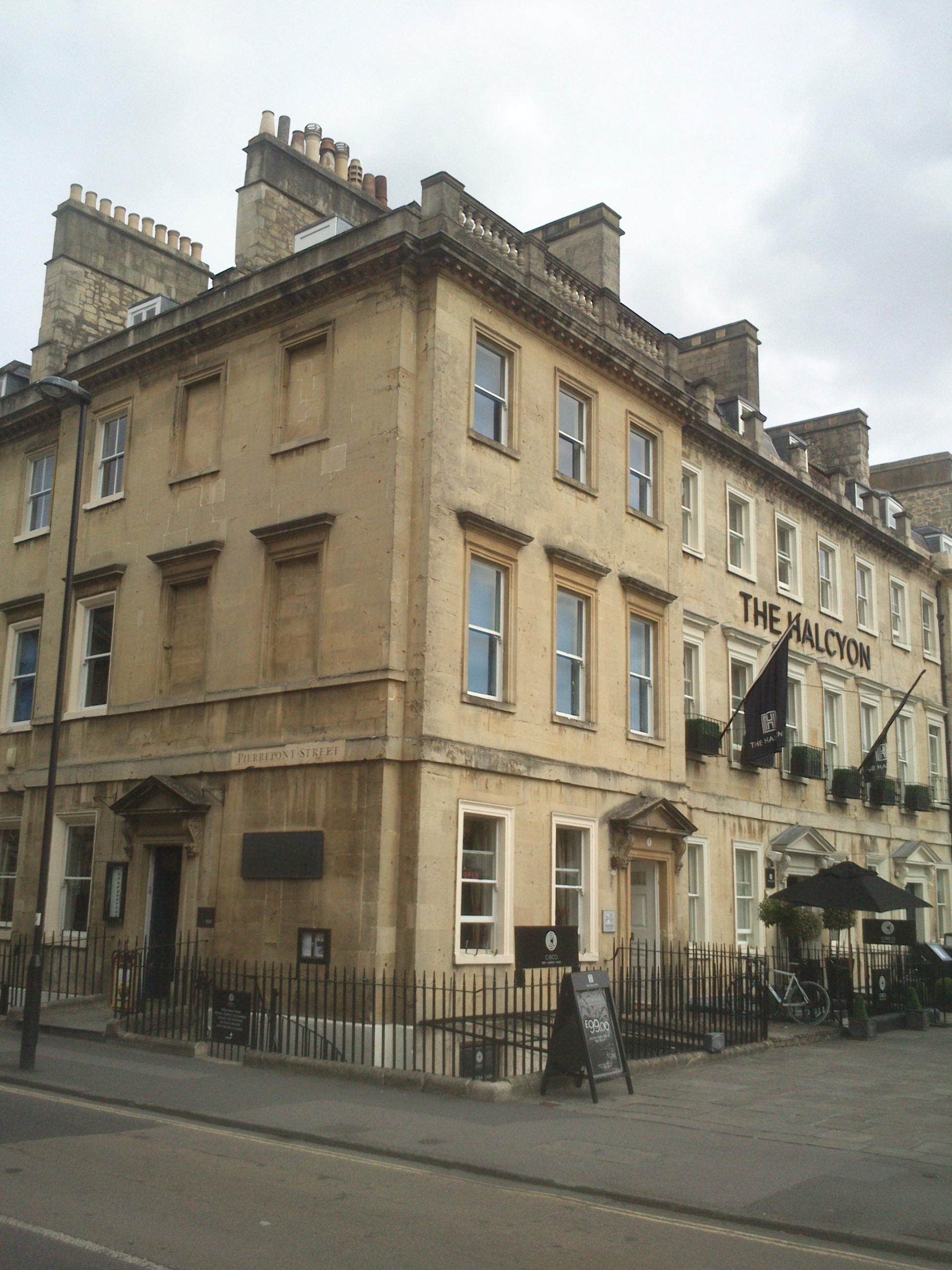
1 South Parade

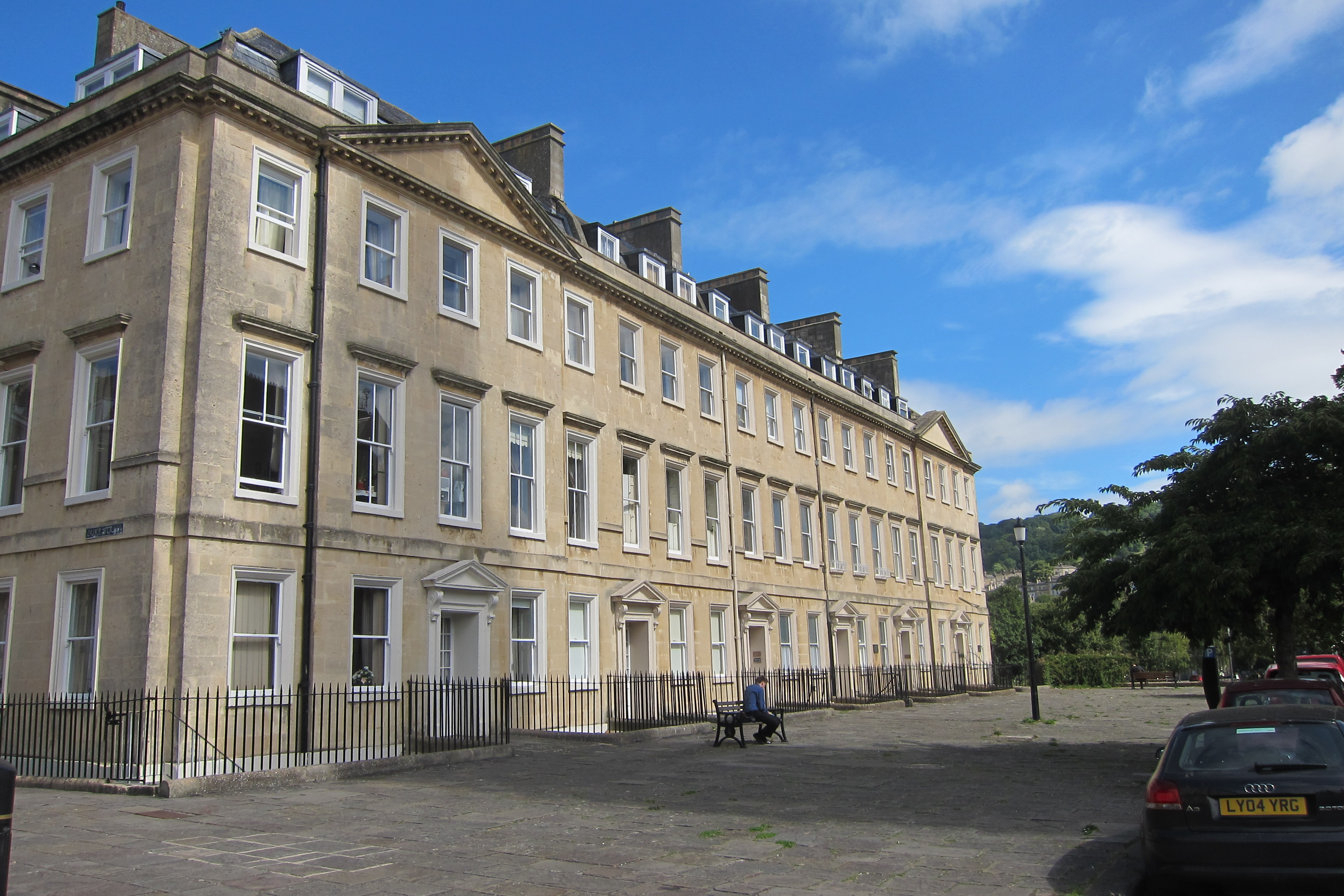
9–13 South Parade

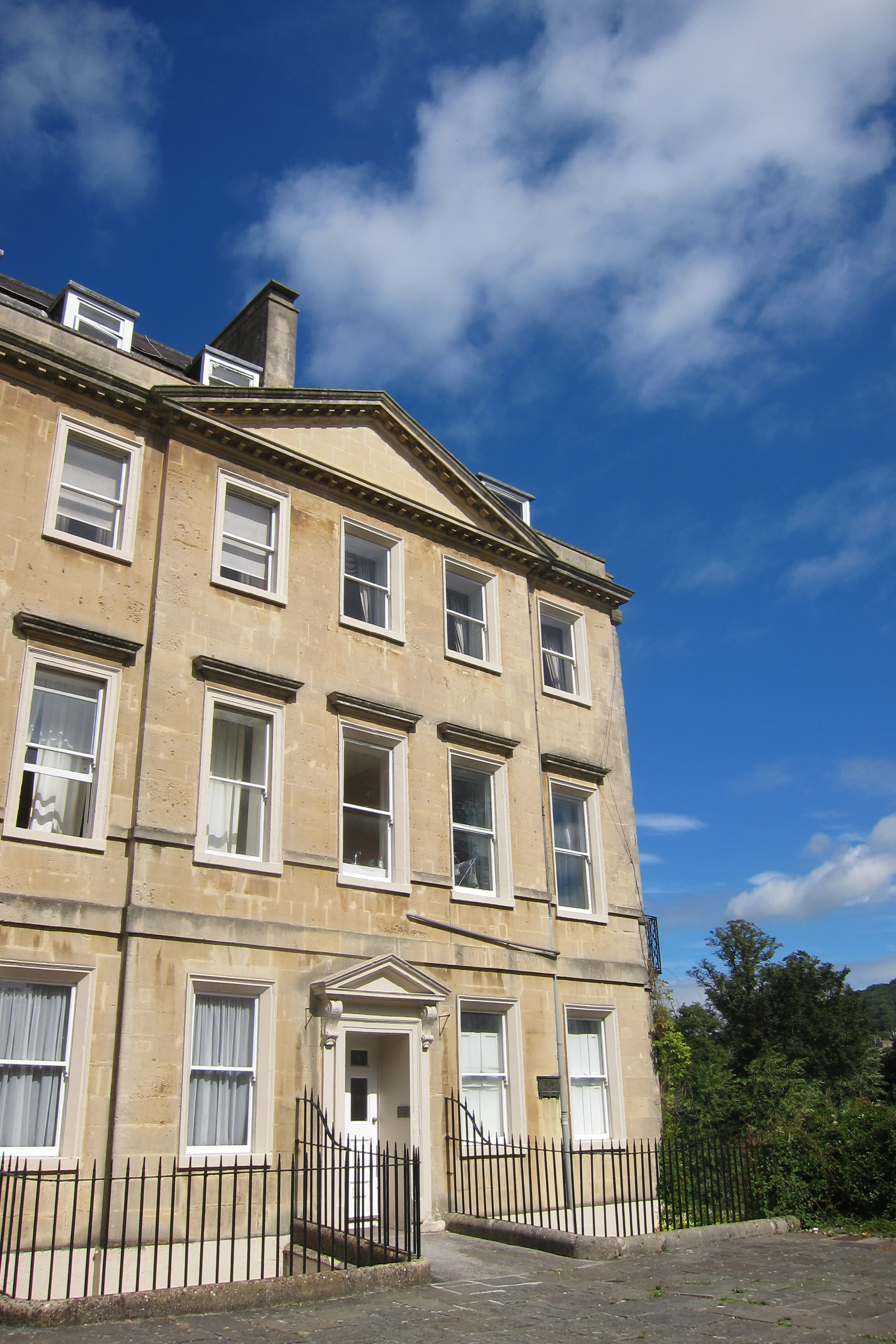
14 South Parade

== See also ==
- List of Grade I listed buildings in Bath and North East Somerset
