= Cross Bath =

The Cross Bath
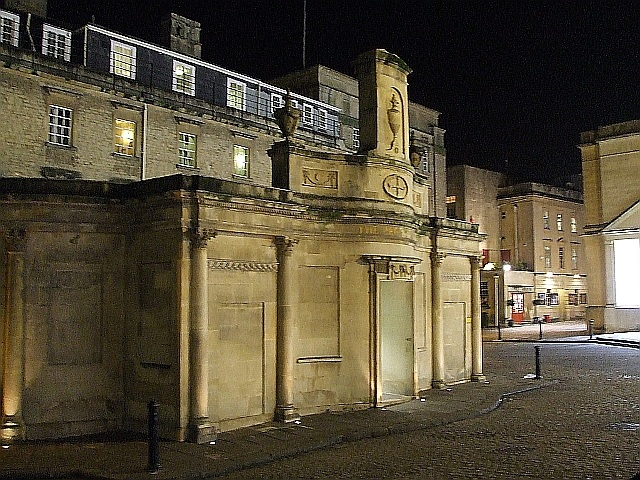

- Location within Somerset
- 51°22′52″N 2°21′41″W
- Location: Bath, Somerset, England

History
- Built: c. 1789

Site notes
- Architect: Thomas Baldwin

Listed Building – Grade I
- Official name: The Cross Bath
- Designated: 12 June 1950
- Reference no.: 1394182

The Cross Bath in Bath Street, Bath, Somerset, England, is a historic pool for bathing. The surrounding structure of the pool was built, in the style of Robert Adam by Thomas Baldwin by 1784 and remodelled by John Palmer in 1789. It is recorded in the National Heritage List for England as a designated Grade I listed building, and was restored during the 1990s by Donald Insall Associates.

== Geology ==
The water which bubbles up from the ground at Bath, fell as rain on the nearby Mendip Hills. It percolates down through limestone aquifers to a depth of between 2,700 metres (8,900 ft) and 4,300 metres (14,100 ft) where geothermal energy raises the water temperature to between 64 °C (147.2 °F) and 96 °C (204.8 °F). Under pressure, the heated water rises to the surface along fissures and faults in the limestone. This process is similar to an artificial one known as Enhanced Geothermal System which also makes use of the high pressures and temperatures below the Earth's crust. Hot water at a temperature of 46 °C (114.8 °F) rises here at the rate of 1,170,000 litres (257,364 imp gal) every day, from a geological fault (the Pennyquick fault).

== History ==
The name Cross Bath is believed to commemorate the body of St Aldhelm resting there on its journey from Doulting to Malmesbury Abbey in 709.

The healing powers of the bath were one of the reasons for the foundation of St John's Hospital, Bath around 1180, by Bishop Reginald Fitz Jocelin, which is among the oldest almshouses in England.

Wherof the bigger is caullid the Crosse Bath, bycause it hath a Cross erectid in the midle of it. This Bath is much frequentid of People ' diseasid with Lepre, Pokkes, Scabbes, and great Aches, and is temperate and pleasant, having a 11. or 12. Arches of Stone in the sides for men to stonde under yn tyme of Reyne

— Leland, John (1538), The itinerary of John Leland the antiquary, vol. 1

In the 16th to 18th centuries the baths were frequently visited by royalty, increasing their popularity. In June 1688, Mary of Modena, wife of King James II, gave birth to a son, Prince James nine months after bathing in the Cross Bath. The Melfort Cross, was erected in 1688 to celebrate the birth.

The structure surrounding the bath was built by Thomas Baldwin in 1784 and remodelled by John Palmer in 1789. The bath was refurbished in the 1990s, by Donald Insall Associates. Access is now administered in conjunction with the adjacent Thermae Bath Spa.

== See also ==
- List of Grade I listed buildings in Bath and North East Somerset
