= Bath Street, Bath =

Bath Street
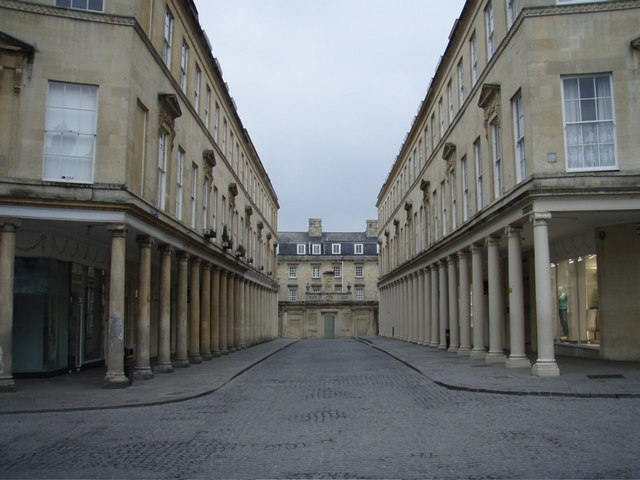
- Looking towards the Cross Bath

- Location within Somerset
- 51°22′52″N 2°21′41″W
- Location: Bath, Somerset, England

History
- Built: 1791

Site notes
- Architect: Thomas Baldwin

Listed Building – Grade I
- Official name: 1-8, Bath Street
- Designated: 12 June 1950
- Reference no.: 1394178

Listed Building – Grade I
- Official name: 9-16, Bath Street
- Designated: 12 June 1950
- Reference no.: 1394181

Listed Building – Grade I
- Official name: The Cross Bath
- Designated: 12 June 1950
- Reference no.: 1394182

Bath Street in Bath, Somerset, England was built by Thomas Baldwin in 1791. Several of the buildings have been designated as Grade I listed buildings.

It was originally named Cross Bath Street as it contains the Cross Bath. It is also the entrance to the much more recent Thermae Bath Spa. At the northern end of the street the buildings are continuous with those in Stall Street.

The two-storey buildings have mansard roofs. Windows are pedimented and have decorative friezes. The south side is formed by numbers 1 to 8, while the north side is numbers 9 to 16, which formed part of the Royal Baths Treatment Centre, and are continuous with the buildings in Stall Street.

Bath Street was used for filming in the 1995 period drama film Persuasion.

== See also ==
- List of Grade I listed buildings in Bath and North East Somerset
