= St James's Square, Bath =

St James's Square
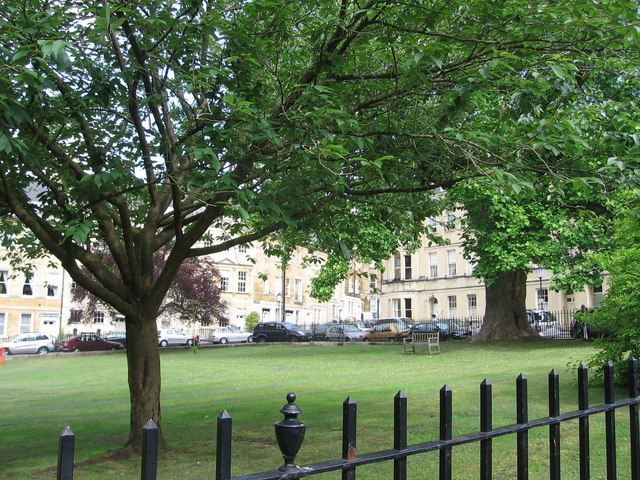

- Location within Somerset
- 51.3891°N 2.3682°W
- Location: Bath, Somerset, England

History
- Built: 1793

Site notes
- Architect: John Palmer
- Architectural style: Georgian

Listed Building – Grade I
- Official name: Nos 1-15 (Consec) And Attached Railings
- Designated: 12 June 1950
- Reference no.: 1394848

Listed Building – Grade I
- Official name: 16-22 (Consec) And Attached Railings
- Designated: 12 June 1950
- Reference no.: 1394849

Listed Building – Grade I
- Official name: 23-37 (Consec) And Attached Railings
- Designated: 12 June 1950
- Reference no.: 1394850

Listed Building – Grade I
- Official name: Nos. 38-45 (Consec) And Attached Railings
- Designated: 12 June 1950
- Reference no.: 1394851

St James's Square in Bath, Somerset, England, consists of 45 Grade I listed buildings. It was built in 1793 by John Palmer.

It is the only complete Georgian square in Bath. Each of the three-storey houses has a mansard roof. The central buildings have pediments on four Corinthian pilasters.

In 1840, number 35 was the home of Charles Dickens.

== See also ==
- List of Grade I listed buildings in Bath and North East Somerset
