= Sion Hill Place, Bath =

Sion Hill Place
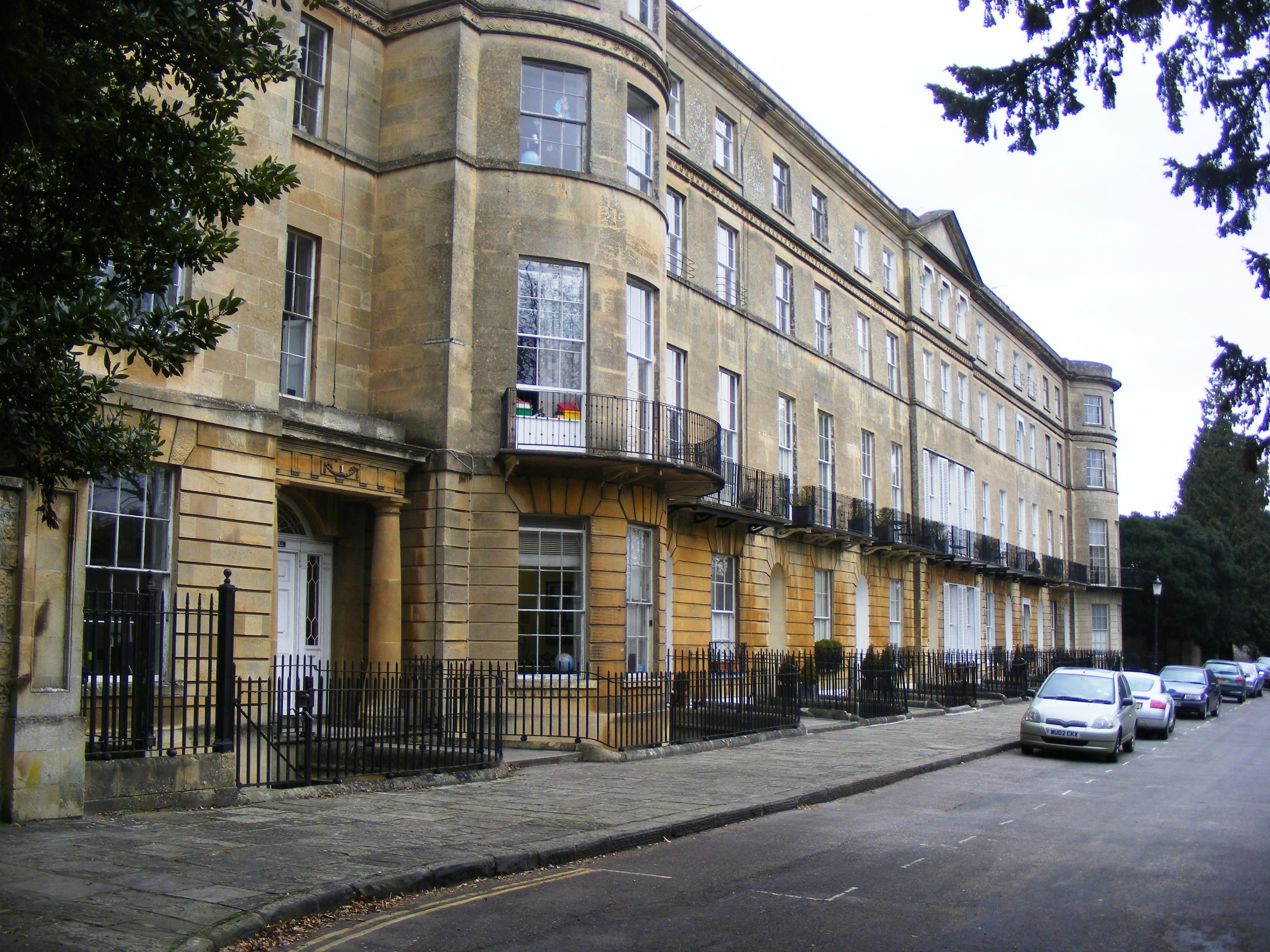
- Sion Hill Place with Summerhill at the near end

- Location within Somerset
- 51°23′41″N 2°22′21″W
- Location: Bath, Somerset, England

History
- Built: 1818–1820

Site notes
- Architect: John Pinch the elder

Listed Building – Grade I
- Official name: Summerhill and Numbers 1 to 9
- Designated: 12 June 1950
- Reference no.: 1394974

Sion Hill Place in the Lansdown area of Bath, Somerset, England was designed by John Pinch the elder and built between 1818 and 1820. Suspension bridge builder and brewer James Dredge, Sr. lived here in the mid-19th century.

Summerhill and numbers 1 to 9 have been designated as a Grade I listed building.

The Georgian terrace of numbers 1 to 9 is made up of 4 storey houses which is symmetrical from which the centre house, number 5, stands forward and has a pediment. The ground floor of all houses is rusticated. The houses at either end have curved segmental bows for their entire height. Numbers 1 to 4 were built by William Cowell Hayes a local painter, while Daniel Aust, from Walcot, built number 5 and possibly the others.

Summerhill House, which is attached to the west end of the terrace, came from Chippenham and was demolished and transported stone by stone.

== Famous residents ==
Madame Sarah Grand, writer, suffragist, and sometime Lady Mayoress of Bath (alongside Mayor Cedric Chivers) lived at number 7 from c.1926–1942/3.

== See also ==
- List of Grade I listed buildings in Bath and North East Somerset
