= Henrietta Street, Bath =

Henrietta Street
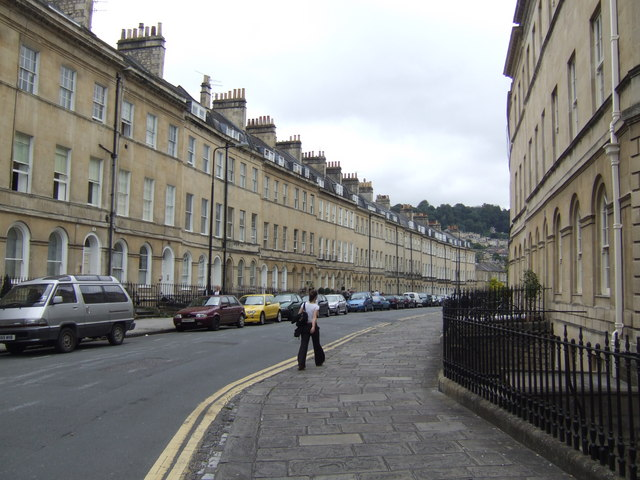

- Location within Somerset
- 51°23′05″N 2°21′25″W
- Location: Bath, Somerset, England

History
- Built: c. 1785

Site notes
- Architect: Thomas Baldwin

Listed Building – Grade I
- Official name: 1, Henrietta Street
- Designated: 12 June 1950
- Reference no.: 1395995

Listed Building – Grade I
- Official name: 2-5, Henrietta Street
- Designated: 12 June 1950
- Reference no.: 1395996

Listed Building – Grade I
- Official name: 6-19, Henrietta Street
- Designated: 12 June 1950
- Reference no.: 1395997

Listed Building – Grade I
- Official name: 20-35, Henrietta Street
- Designated: 12 June 1950
- Reference no.: 1395998

Henrietta Street in the Bathwick area of Bath, Somerset, England was built around 1785 by Thomas Baldwin.

Numbers 1 to 35 were built together in a terrace with a consistent style of 3 storey houses. They complement the surrounding Georgian buildings and layout of Laura Place, Great Pulteney Street and Johnstone Street.

== See also ==
- List of Grade I listed buildings in Bath and North East Somerset
