= Laura Place, Bath =

Laura Place
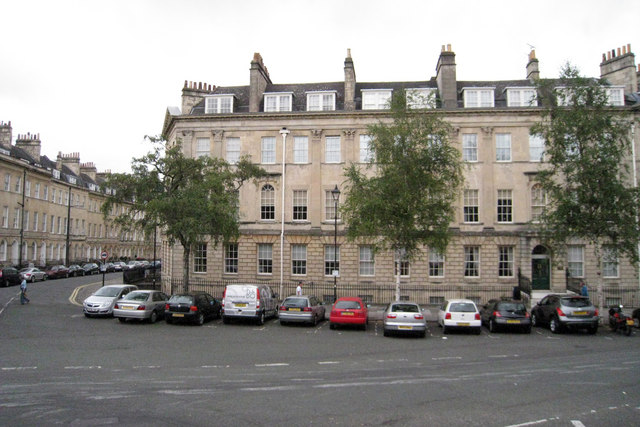

- Location within Somerset
- 51°23′01.1″N 2°21′22.7″W
- Location: Bathwick, Bath, Somerset, England

History
- Built: 1788

Site notes
- Architect(s): Thomas Baldwin and John Eveleigh

Listed Building – Grade I
- Official name: Nos. 1, 2 and 3, Laura Place
- Designated: 12 June 1950
- Reference no.: 1394773

Listed Building – Grade I
- Official name: 1–7, Great Pulteney Street; 36 and 37 Henrietta Street; 4, 5 and 6, Laura Place
- Designated: 12 June 1950 (4, 5 and 6, Laura Place)
- Reference no.: 1396180

Listed Building – Grade I
- Official name: Nos. 7, 8 and 9, Laura Place
- Designated: 12 June 1950
- Reference no.: 1394783

Listed Building – Grade I
- Official name: Nos. 10, 11 and 12, Laura Place
- Designated: 12 June 1950
- Reference no.: 1394786

Listed Building – Grade II
- Official name: Fountain
- Designated: 11 August 1972
- Reference no.: 1394787

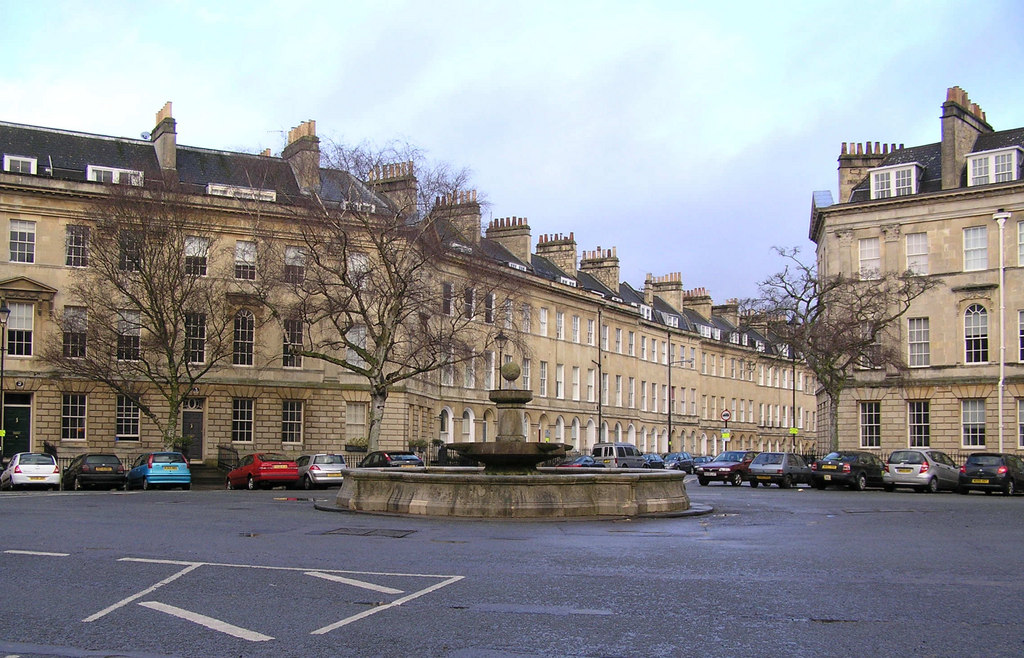
Fountain in Laura Place, Bath

Laura Place in Bathwick, Bath, Somerset, England, consists of four blocks of houses around an irregular quadrangle at the end of Pulteney Bridge. It was built by Thomas Baldwin and John Eveleigh between 1788 and 1794.

Numbers 4, 5 and 6 are combined with Numbers 1 to 7 Great Pulteney Street, and others with Henrietta Street.

== History ==
The fountain at the center of the quadrangle was not part of the original plan; it was added in the late 19th century. After completion of the main street in 1877 local residents petitioned and successfully raised significant funds to build a grand column (rather like Nelson's Column in London). However, as construction of the column started, the residents realised that the addition would tower over the area (it would be 50% taller than the houses), and so they then petitioned for it to be cancelled. After some negotiations, the column was pulled down and the much smaller fountain added instead. It consists of a circular stone basin with four radial projections surmounted by an urn with gadrooned bowl.

== See also ==
- List of Grade I listed buildings in Bath and North East Somerset
