= Church of St Michael the Archangel, Compton Martin =

Anglican church in Somerset, England

Coordinates: 51.31028°N 2.65416°W

Church of St Michael the Archangel
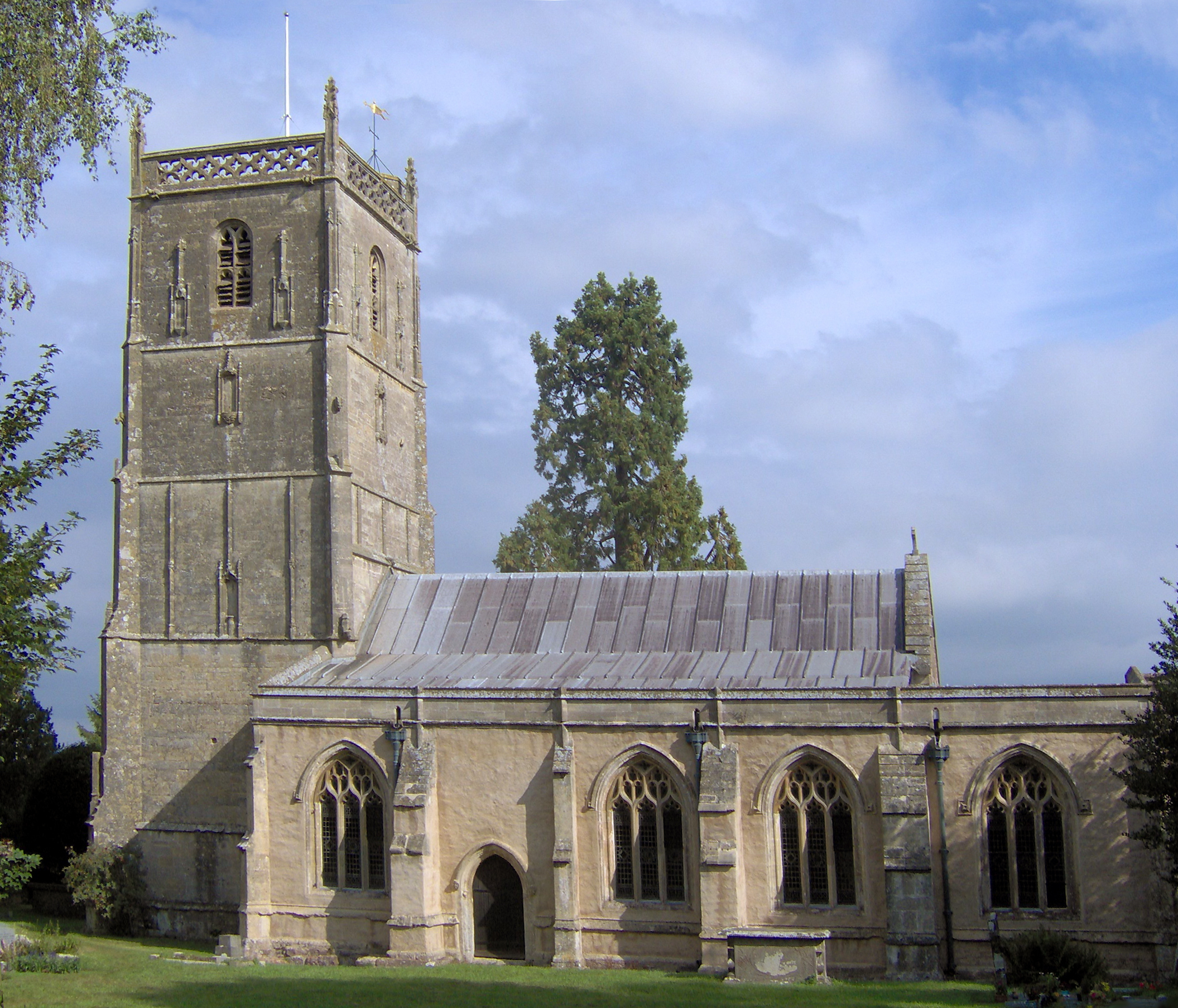
- Interactive map of the Church of St Michael the Archangel area

General information
- Architectural style: Norman
- Location: Compton Martin, England
- Completed: 12th century

The Parish church of St Michael the Archangel (grid reference ST545570) is in the village of Compton Martin, Somerset, England. The church is a grade I listed building, and several of the monuments in the church yard also have listed status. The church is dedicated to St Michael the Archangel.

The church was built in the 12th century, in a Norman style funded by William FitzWalter. The tower was added in 1441. Norman vaulting can be seen in the chancel, with arcades forming aisles north and south of the nave and clerestory. There is Jacobean work in the choir stalls and organ screen. In the north wall is a recess containing the effigy of Thomas de Moreton, which was discovered in 1858. One of the columns in the south side of the nave has an unusual spiral fluted decoration known as an apprentices’ column.

Above the ceiling of the Bickfield Chapel there is a void which contains a columbarium or dovecote. This housed 140 “squabs” or pigeons in 1606 for the rector's table.

The four-stage tower is approached from the nave via a lofty Tudor panelled arch which together with the tower itself is supported by diagonal buttresses. It dates from c. 1370 or 1443. It is some 70 feet (21 m) high and contains six 18th-century bells, five of which were cast by the Bilbies of Chew Stoke.

Wade and Wade in their 1929 book "Somerset" described the church as "quite remarkable". "The church is one of the finest bits of Norm. work in the county. The nave is entirely late Norm., and possesses the unusual feature of a clerestory. The fine arcades, with their cylindrical columns and circular abaci, are too obvious to escape notice, but particular attention should be paid to the twisted pillar on the N.E. The chancel has an extremely low quadripartite vault, the effect of which is rather spoilt by the distortion of the chancel arch through some defect in the foundations. The aisles are Perp., and the one on the S. curiously encloses the clerestory. Note (1) the junction of the Perp. arch and Norm. pillars, (2) recessed effigy of a lady at E. end of N. aisle, (3) semi-circular recess, probably for additional altar (cp. Cudworth); (4) Norm. font on a fluted pedestal, (5) Perp. screen, said to have been an importation. There is a Perp. W. tower of weak design and poor workmanship, opening into the nave by a panelled arch."

The parish is part of the benefice of Blagdon with Compton Martin and Ubley.

== See also ==
- List of ecclesiastical parishes in the Diocese of Bath and Wells
