= Wood Street, Bath =

Wood Street
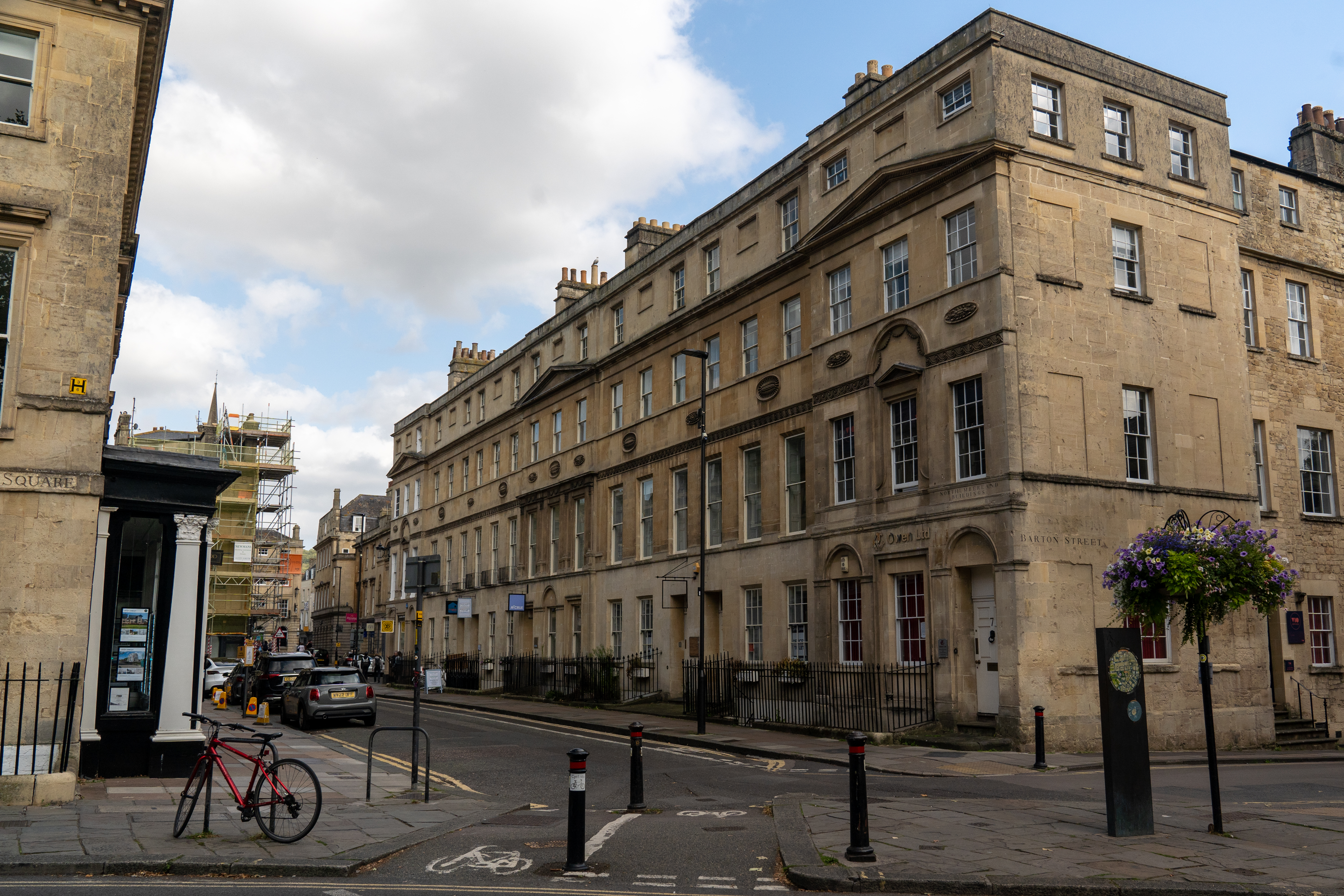

- Location within Somerset
- 51°22′59″N 2°21′46″W
- Location: Bath, Somerset, England

History
- Built: 1778

Site notes
- Architect: John Wood, the Elder

Listed Building – Grade I
- Official name: 1A and 1 to 6, Wood Street
- Designated: 12 June 1950
- Reference no.: 1395789

Listed Building – Grade II*
- Official name: Nos. 1-7 (Consec) With Railings, Northumberland Buildings
- Designated: 12 June 1950
- Reference no.: 1396192

Wood Street in Bath, Somerset, England was built in 1778 and has been designated as a Grade I listed building.

The street was designed by John Wood, the Elder and built by Thomas Baldwin in the same style as the adjacent Queen Square.

== Gallery ==
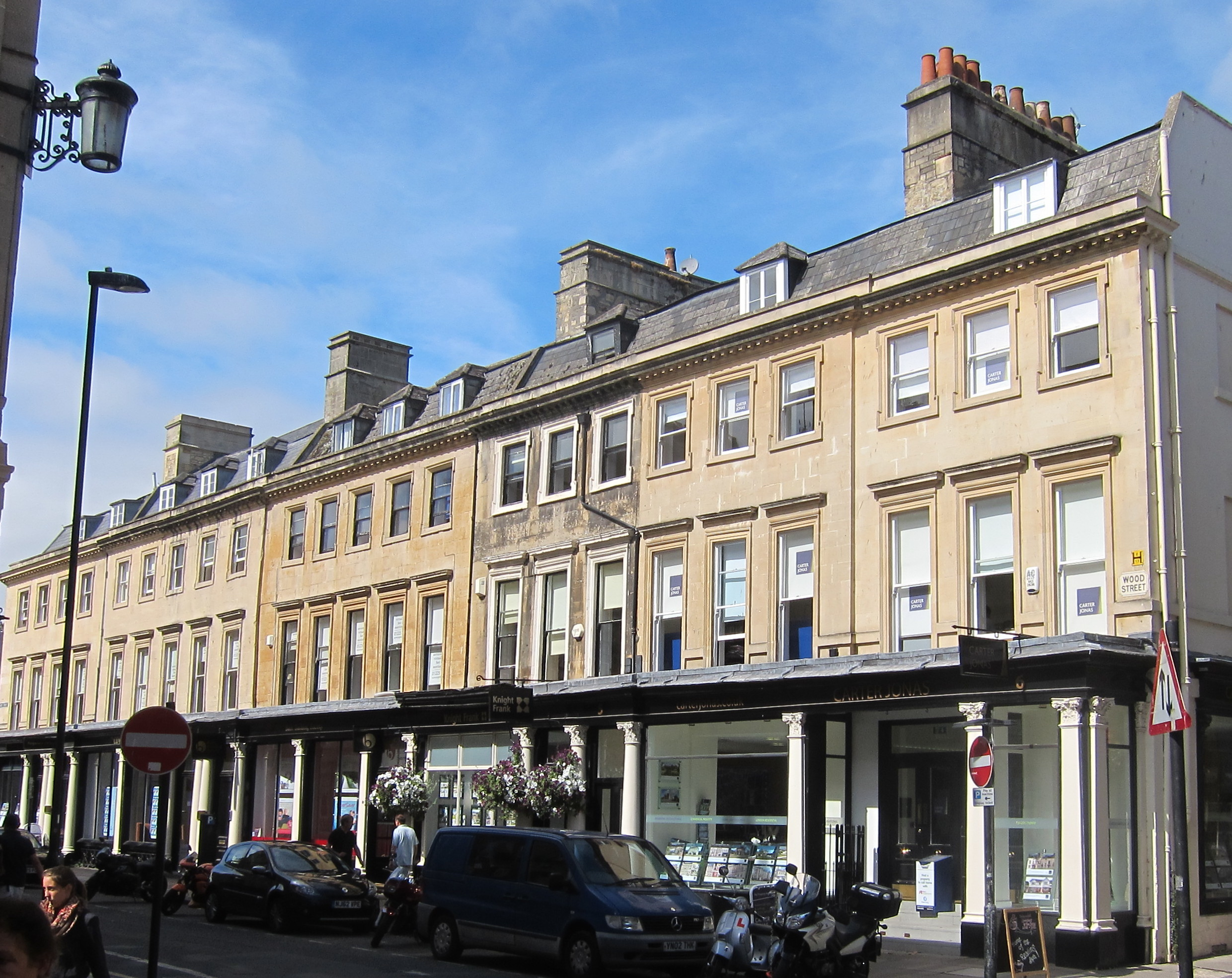
1A and 1–6, Wood Street

== See also ==
- List of Grade I listed buildings in Bath and North East Somerset
