= 1772 in art =

Events from the year 1772 in art.

== Events ==
- April 24 – The Royal Academy Exhibition of 1772 opens at Somerset House in London
- May 13 – The rival Society of Artists of Great Britain holds its own Exhibition of 1772 in the Strand in London
- July 13 – Captain James Cook leaves Plymouth in HMS Resolution on his second voyage of exploration with landscape painter William Hodges onboard (in lieu of Johann Zoffany).
- King George III of the United Kingdom appoints Benjamin West official painter to the court.

== Works ==
- John Singleton Copley – Samuel Adams (Museum of Fine Arts, Boston)
- Thomas Gainsborough
  - The Linley Sisters
  - Portrait of Thomas Linley the Younger
  - Portrait of Sir William Pulteney
- Thomas Jones – Pencerrig
- Tilly Kettle – Dancing Girls (Blacks)
- Anton Raphael Mengs – The Triumph of History over Time (Allegory of the Museum Clementinum; ceiling fresco in the Camera dei Papiri, Vatican Library)
- Fyodor Rokotov – Portrait of Alexandra Struyskaya
- Alexander Roslin
  - King Christian VII of Denmark
  - King Gustav III of Sweden
- George Stubbs
  - The Kongouro from New Holland
  - Portrait of a Large Dog
- Claude Joseph Vernet – The Shipwreck
- Benjamin West
  - The Death of Chevalier Bayard
  - Portrait of Joseph Banks
- Joseph Wright of Derby
  - An Iron Forge
  - Miravan Breaking Open the Tomb of his Ancestors
  - Self-Portrait
- Johann Zoffany
  - The Academicians of the Royal Academy
  - Queen Charlotte with Members of Her Family
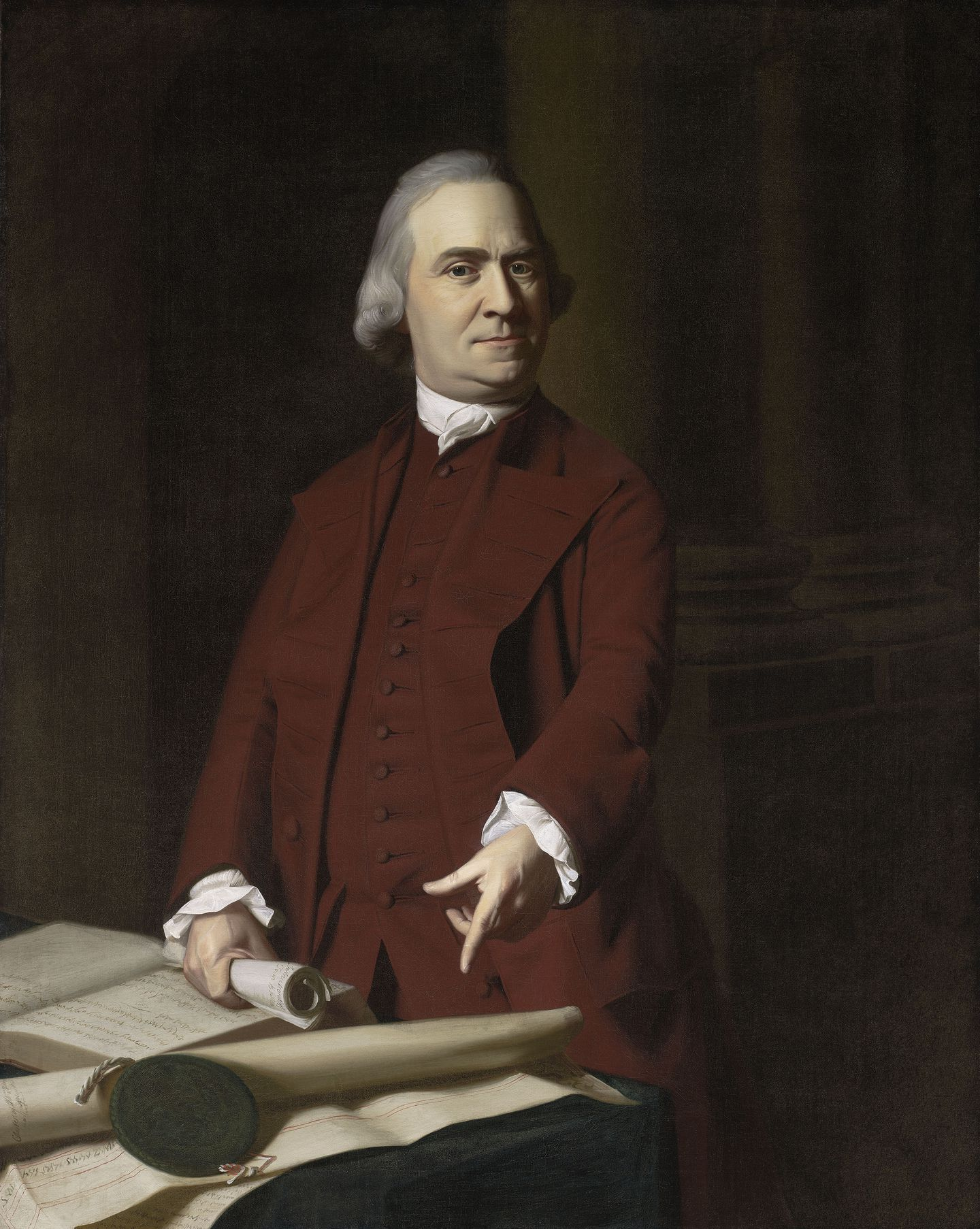
Copley – Samuel Adams

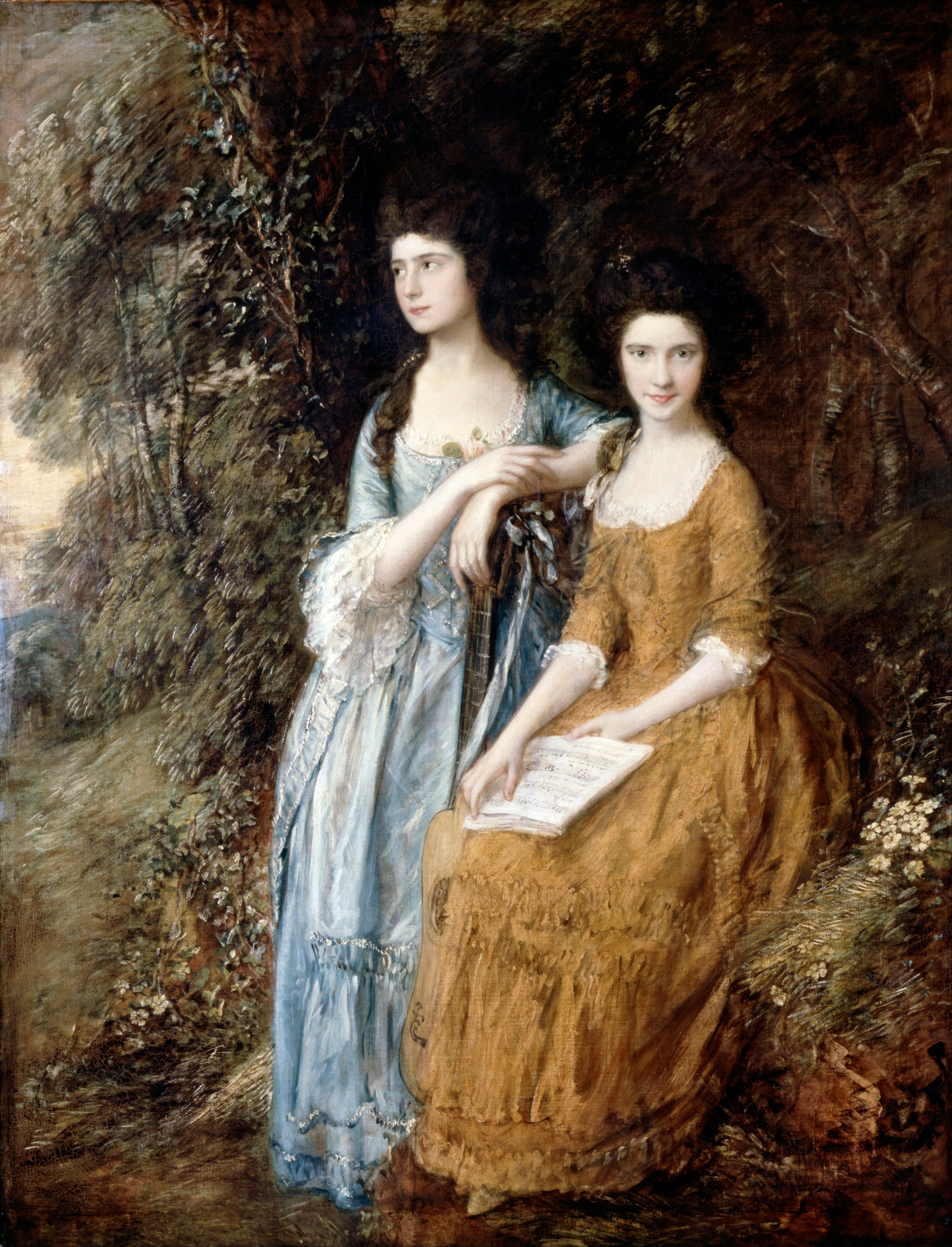
Gainsborough – The Linley Sisters

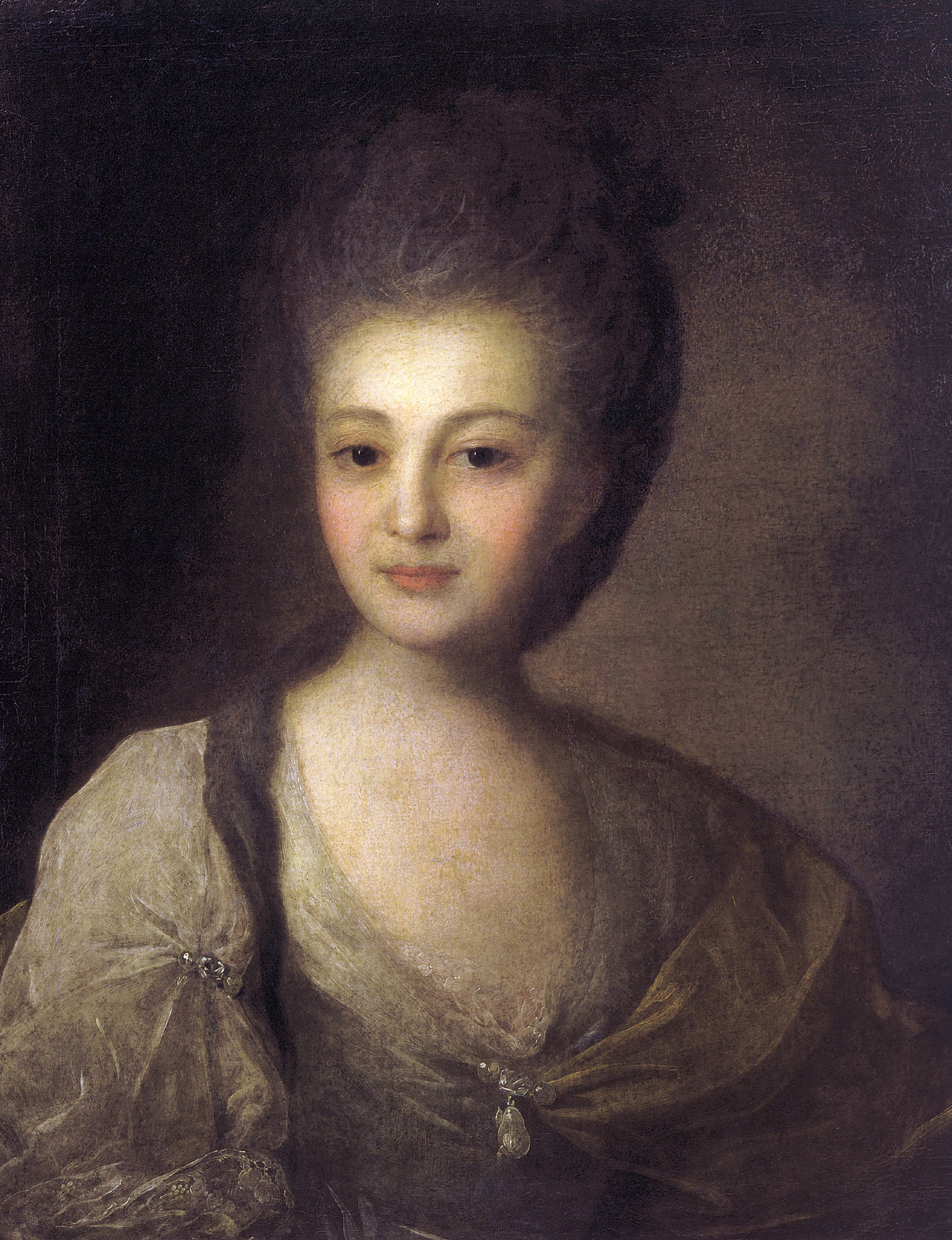
Rokotov – Portrait of Alexandra Struyskaya

Vernet – The Shipwreck

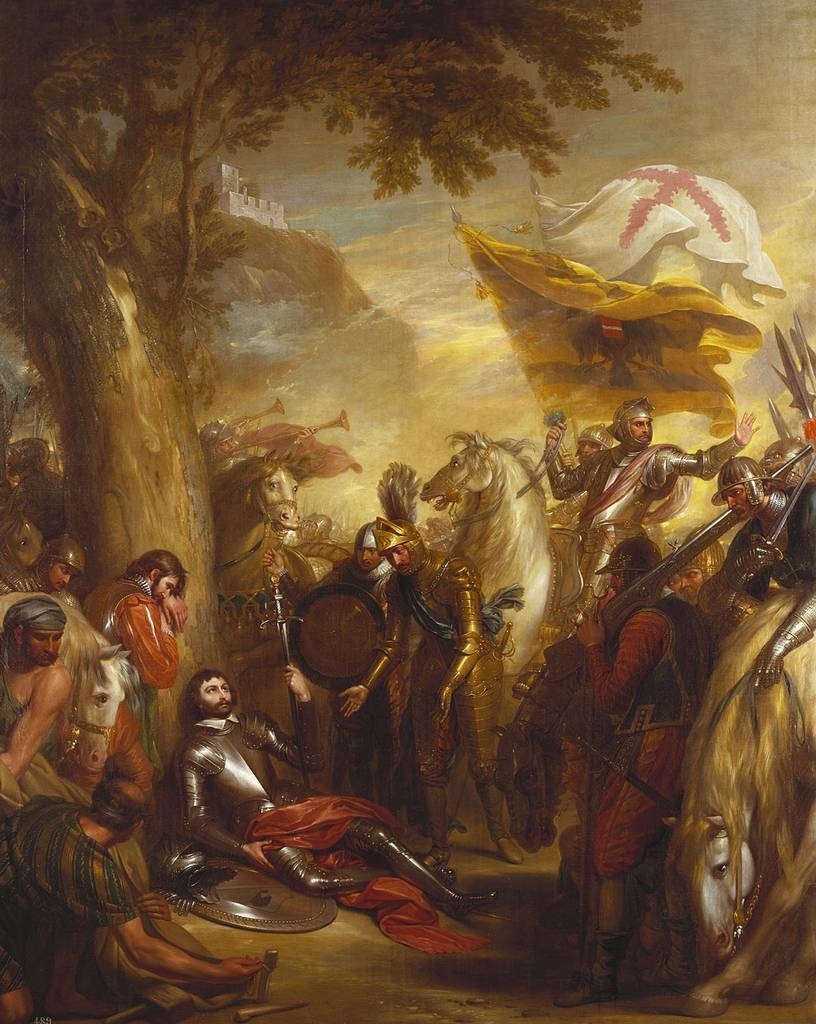
The Death of Chevalier Bayard by Benjamin West

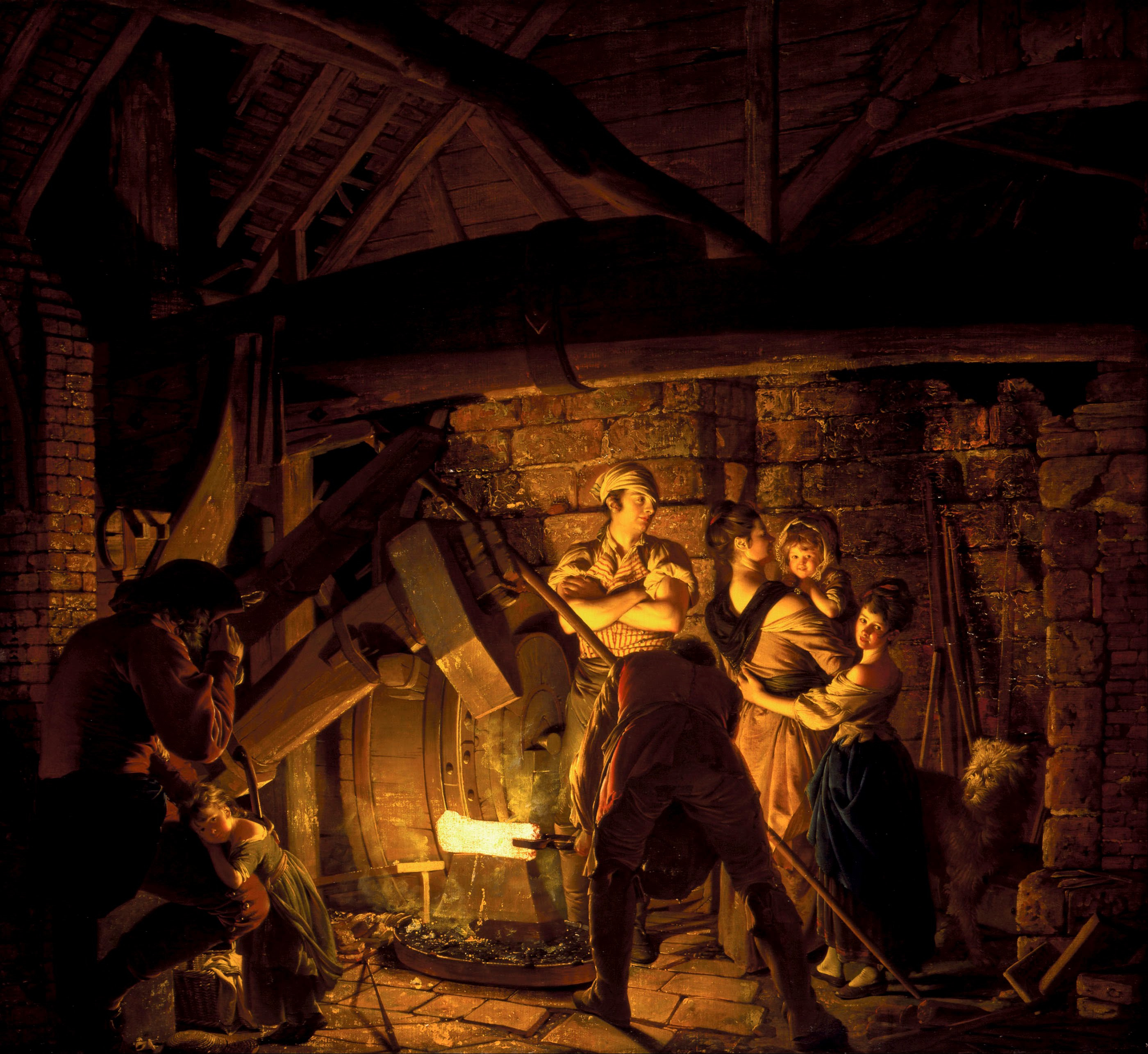
An Iron Forge by Joseph Wright of Derby

== Awards ==
- John Flaxman is unsuccessful in the competition for the gold medal of the Royal Academy.

== Births ==
- February 8 – Louis-Marie Autissier, French-born Belgian portrait miniature painter (died 1830)
- February 26 – Gerhard von Kügelgen, German painter of portraits and history paintings (died 1820)
- May 11 – Adélaïde Victoire Hall, French painter (died 1844)
- August 11 – Eduard Joseph d'Alton, German engraver and naturalist (died 1840)
- September 19 – Vicente López y Portaña, Spanish portrait painter (died 1850)
- date unknown
  - Edward Bird, painter (died 1819)
  - Alexander Day, English miniature painter and art dealer (died 1841)
  - François Louis Thomas Francia, landscape painter (died 1839)
  - William Hamlin, American engraver and the first engraver for the state of Rhode Island (died 1869)
  - Joaquín Bernardo Rubert, Spanish still life floral painter (died 1817)
  - Wendela Gustafva Sparre, Swedish textile artist and member of the Royal Swedish Academy of Art (died 1855)
  - Pavel Đurković, Serbian painter and muralist (died 1830).

== Deaths ==
- June 1 – Marcellus Laroon the Younger, English painter and draughtsman (born 1679)
- June 4 – Johann Michael Feuchtmayer, stucco sculptor and plasterer (born 1709)
- August 31 – Marie-Suzanne Giroust, French painter (born 1734)
- October 12 – Samuel Scott, English marine and topographical painter and etcher (born 1702)
- October 20 – William Taverner, English judge and landscape painter (born 1703)
- November 11 – Jan Maurits Quinkhard, Dutch painter and print designer (born 1688)
- November 19 – Charles Norbert Roettiers, French engraver (born 1720)
- date unknown
  - Benoît Audran the Younger, French engraver (born 1698)
  - Giovanni Angelo Borroni, Italian painter of the late-Baroque and early-Neoclassic periods (born 1684)
  - Robert Gillow, furniture designer (born 1704)
  - José Romeo, Spanish painter (born 1701)
  - Huang Shen, Chinese painter (born 1687)
  - Johanne Seizberg, German-Danish illustrator and teacher (born 1732)
  - Alejandro González Velázquez, Spanish late-Baroque architect and painter (born 1719)
  - Zou Yigui, Chinese painter in Qing Dynasty (born 1686)
