= 1701 in art =

Events from the year 1701 in art.

== Events ==
- November – Philippe Bertrand becomes a member of the Académie de peinture et de sculpture.
- December 31 – Pierre Gobert becomes a member of the Académie de peinture et de sculpture.
- 13-year-old François Lemoyne becomes a member of the Académie de peinture et de sculpture.
- Peter Strudel becomes Reichsfreiherr and is appointed the director of the landscape academy in Vienna.
- A sculptured life-size series on the Danse Macabre theme is moved to the old Neustädter Kirchhoff following a fire at the palace of Duke George in Dresden.

== Paintings ==
- Giuseppe Maria Crespi – The Ecstasy of Saint Margaret
- Sir Godfrey Kneller – William III on Horseback
- Sebastiano Ricci – Ascension (Santi Apostoli, Rome)
- Hyacinthe Rigaud – Portrait of Louis XIV of the House of Bourbon, the Sun King

== Publications ==
- Gerard de Lairesse – Grondlegginge der teekenkonst

== Births ==
- April 28 – Françoise Basseporte, French court painter (died 1780)
- May 29 – Georg Friedrich Strass, Alsatian jeweler and inventor of imitation gemstones and the rhinestone (died 1773)
- June 4 – Theodoor Verhaegen, sculptor from the Southern Netherlands (died 1759)
- November 5 – Pietro Longhi, Venetian painter (died 1785)
- December 16 – Olof Arenius, Swedish portrait painter (died 1766)
- December 21 – Guillaume Taraval, Swedish painter of French descent (died 1750)
- date unknown
  - Jan George Freezen, German portrait painter (died 1775)
  - Thomas Hudson, English portrait painter (died 1779)
  - Matthew Pilkington, Irish art historian and satirist (died 1774)
  - José Romeo, Spanish painter of the Baroque period (died 1722)

== Deaths ==
- January 1 – Henri Gascar, French painter (born 1635)
- March 28 – Domenico Guidi, sculptor (born 1625)
- May 8 – Jacob de Heusch, painter (born 1656)
- June 29 – Pieter Mulier II, Dutch Golden Age painter (born 1637)
- July 16 – Justus Danckerts, Dutch engraver (born 1635)
- July 24 – John Bushnell, English sculptor (date of birth unknown)
- date unknown – Jacob Gillig, Dutch Golden Age painter of still lifes, usually of fish, as well as portraits (born 1636)
