= Royal Academy Exhibition of 1772 =

1772 art exhibition in London

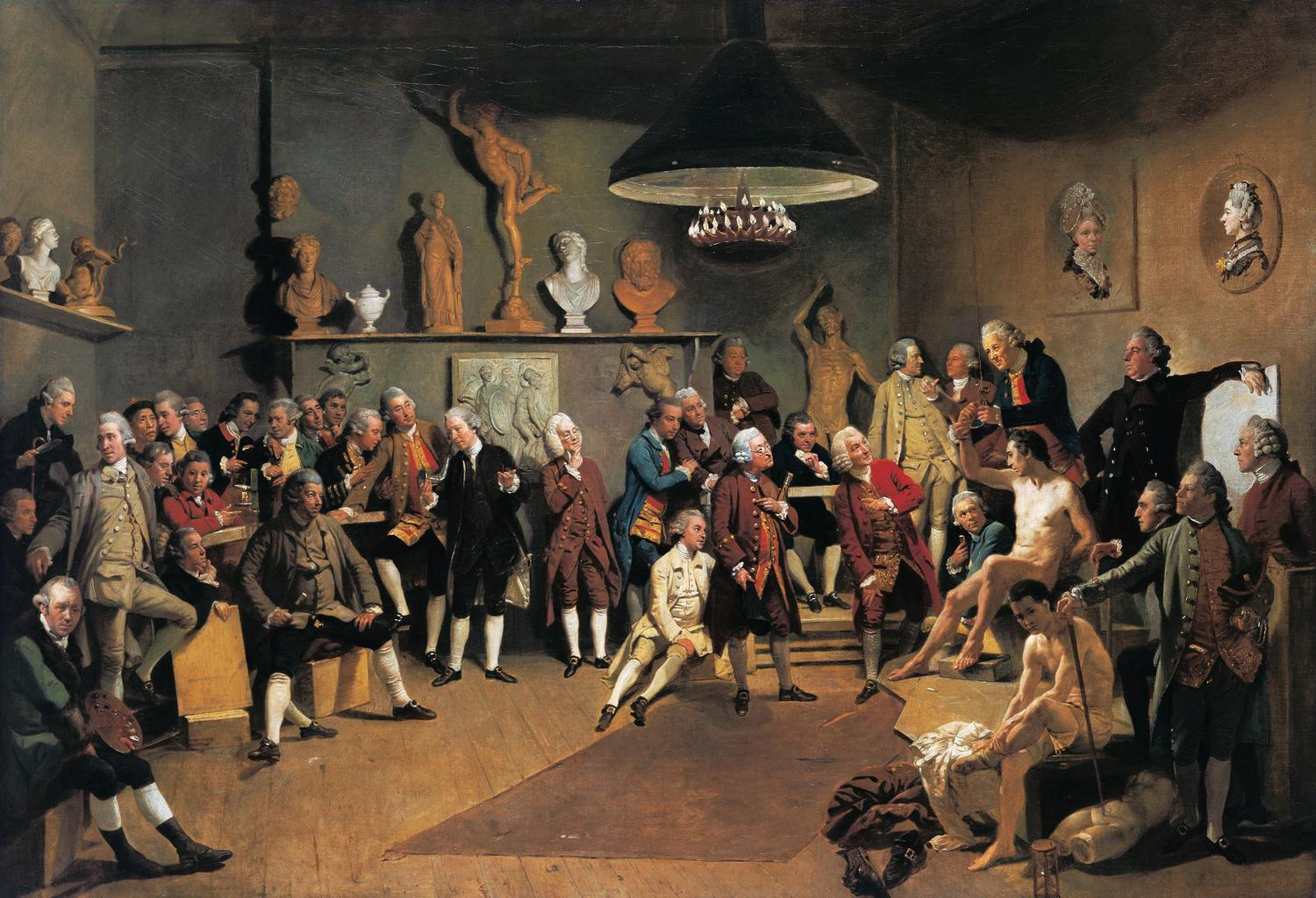
The Academicians of the Royal Academy by Johann Zoffany

The Royal Academy Exhibition of 1772 was an art exhibition held in London from 24 April to 21 May 1772. It was the fourth annual Summer Exhibition of the Royal Academy of Arts.

As with every Academy show before the 1780, when it moved to Somerset House, the exhibition was held at Christopher Cock's auction rooms in Pall Mall. A major attraction of the exhibition was Johann Zoffany's The Academicians of the Royal Academy depicting much of the membership of the Academy. It attracted crowds in a similar manner as The Death of General Wolfe had at the previous year's exhibition.

Amongst the several portraits displayed by the President of the Royal Academy Joshua Reynolds was the Scottish academic William Robertson. The Bath-based Thomas Gainsborough's submissions featured four portraits. Three included The Linley Sisters and Portrait of Sir William Pulteney, notable figures in the city's life.

In history painting Benjamin West displayed his Penn's Treaty with the Indians while the Irish artist James Barry exhibited three works including Venus Rising from the Sea and The Education of Achilles.

The Academy extended an invitation to leading French painters and sculptors to take part in the 1772 exhibition and a around a dozen featured work. Notably Philip James de Loutherbourg settled and London where he became known for his romantic landscapes.

The rival Society of Artists of Great Britain from which the Royal Academy has split in 1768, staged their own larger Exhibition between 13 May and 20 June 1772 at newly-built headquarters in the Strand.

== Gallery ==
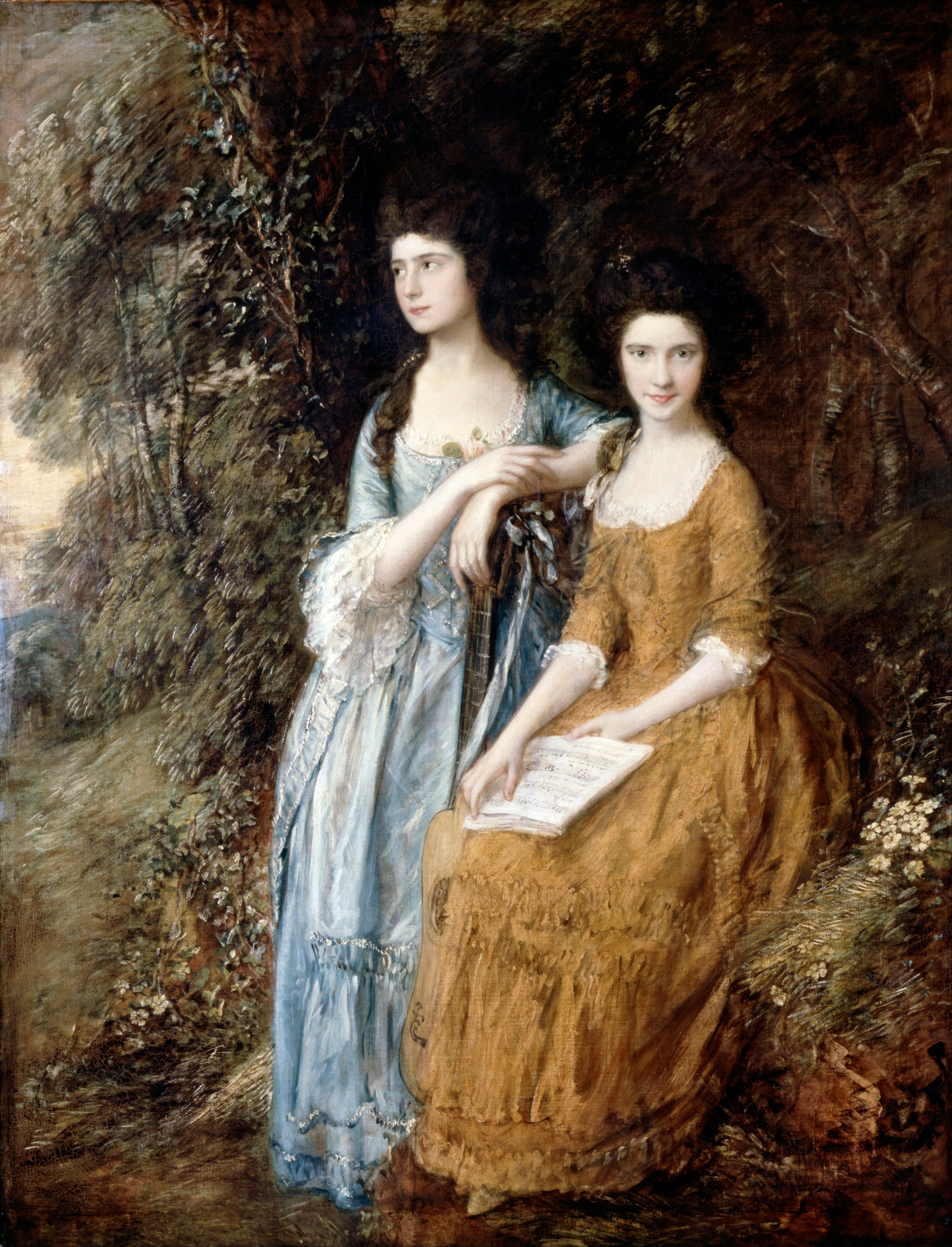
The Linley Sisters by Thomas Gainsborough

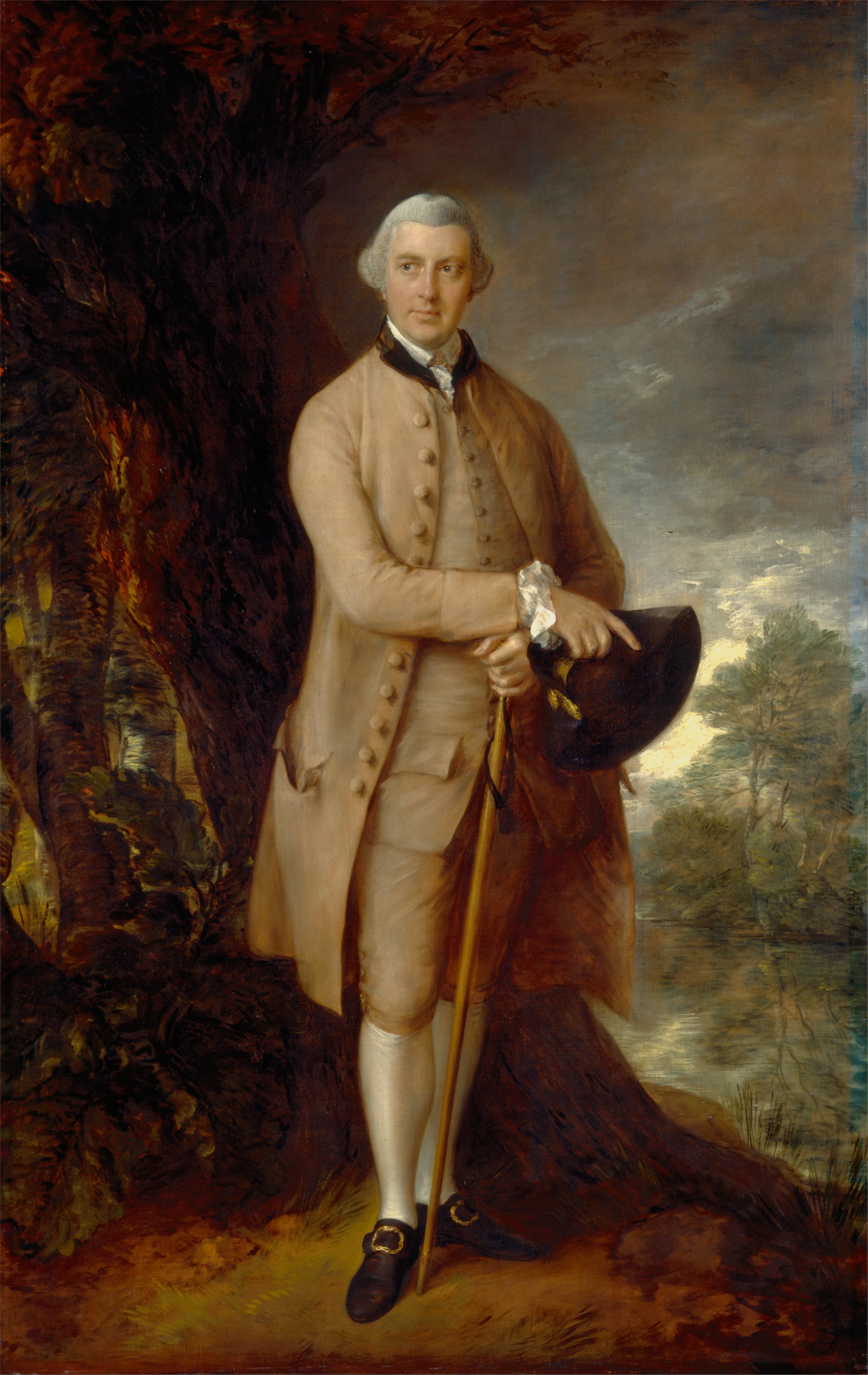
Portrait of Sir William Pulteney by Thomas Gainsborough

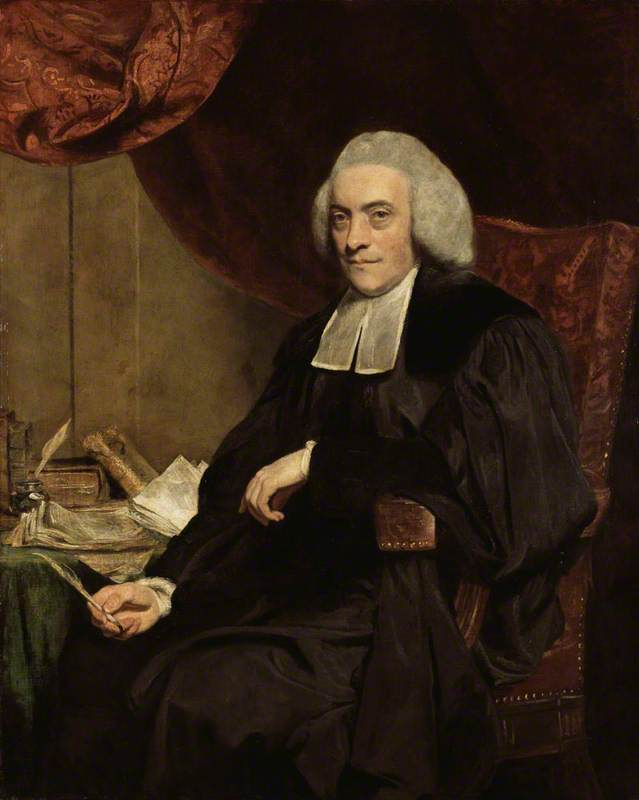
Portrait of William Robertson by Joshua Reynolds

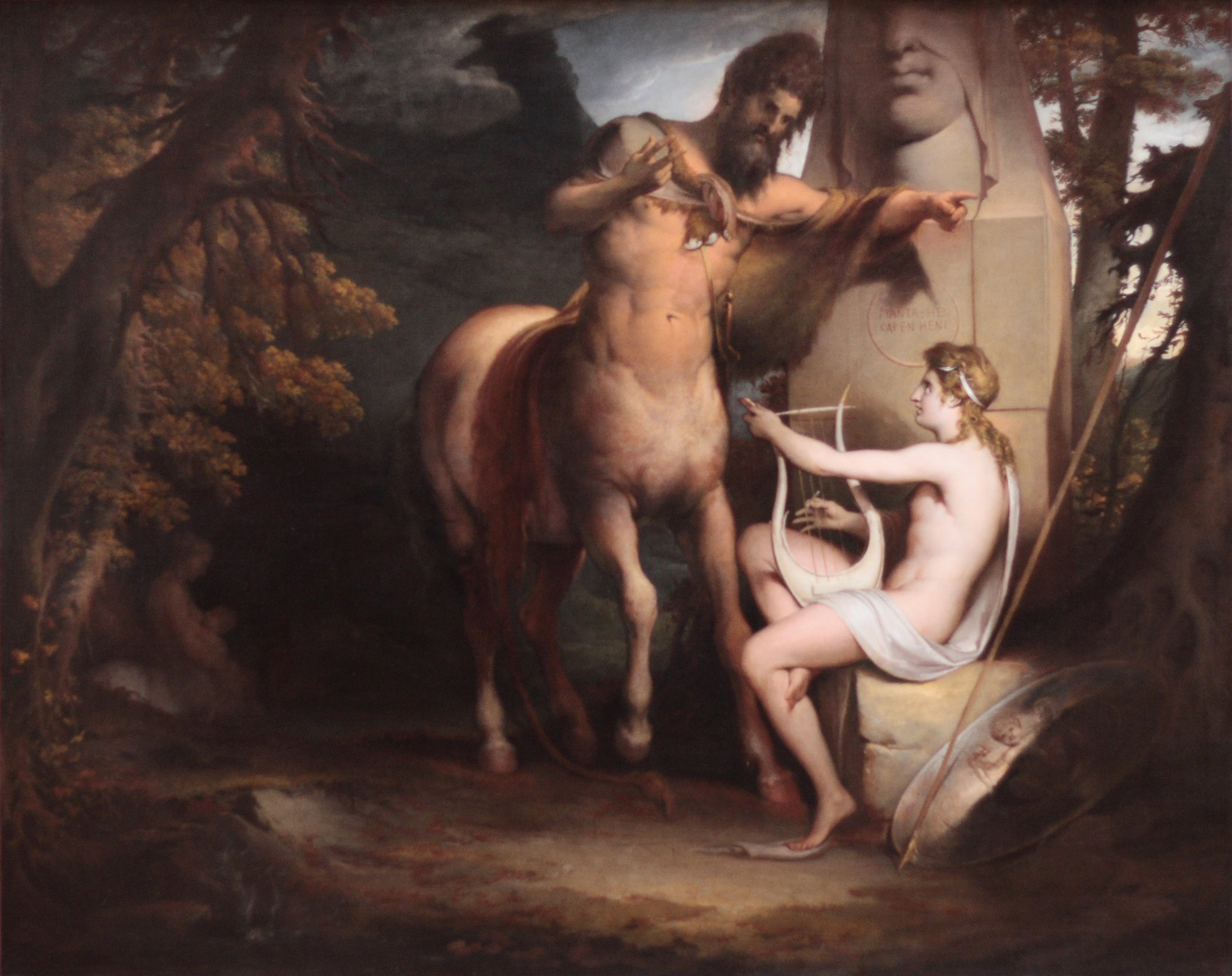
The Education of Achilles by James Barry

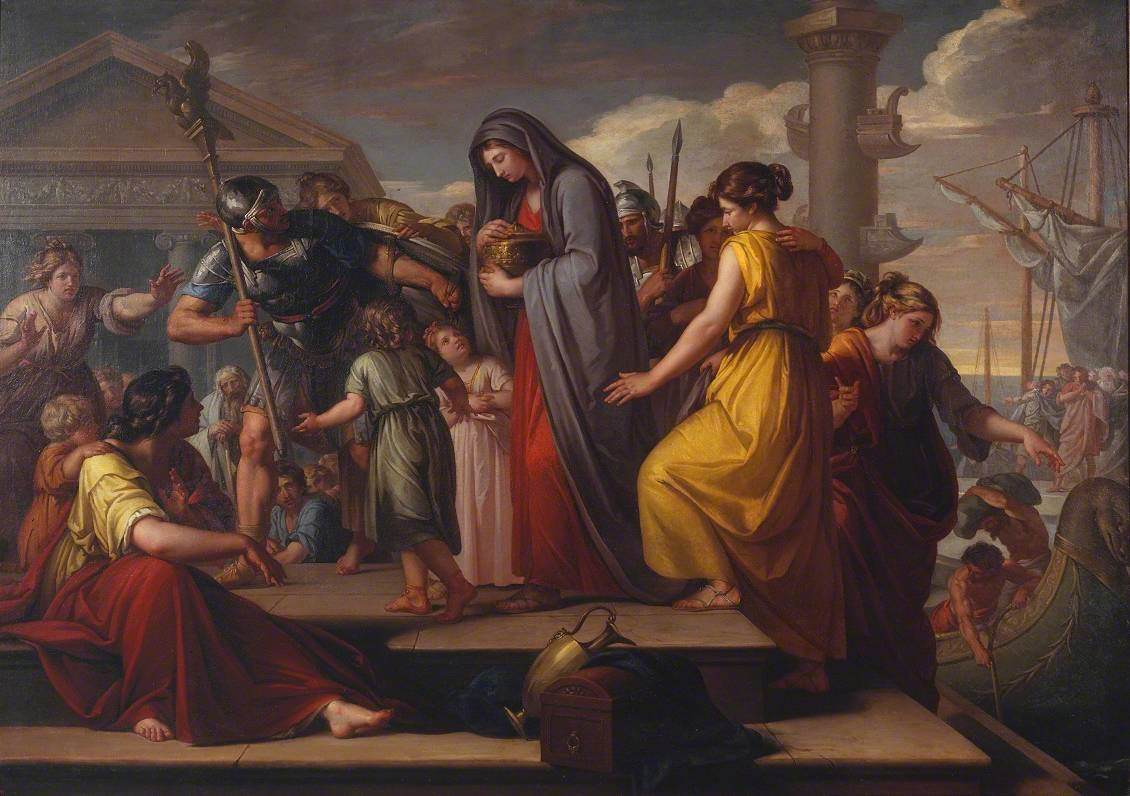
Agrippina Landing at Brindisium with the Ashes of Germanicus by Gavin Hamilton

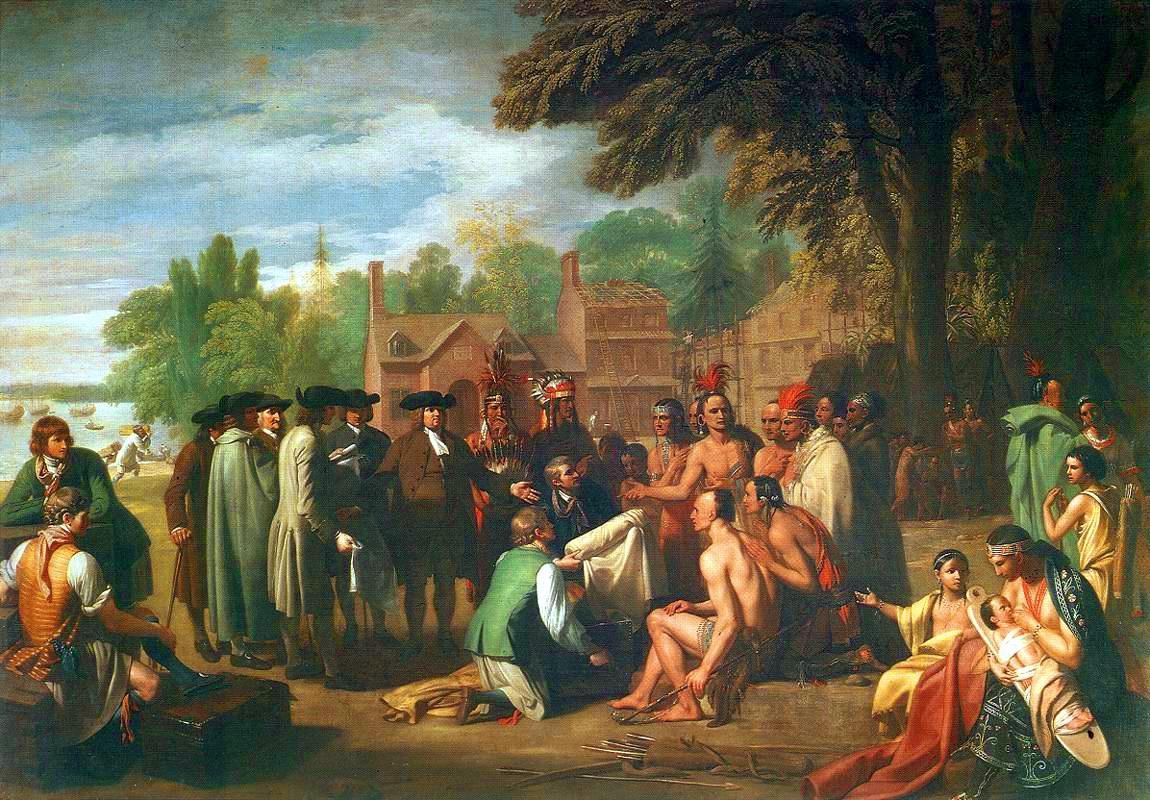
Penn's Treaty with the Indians by Benjamin West

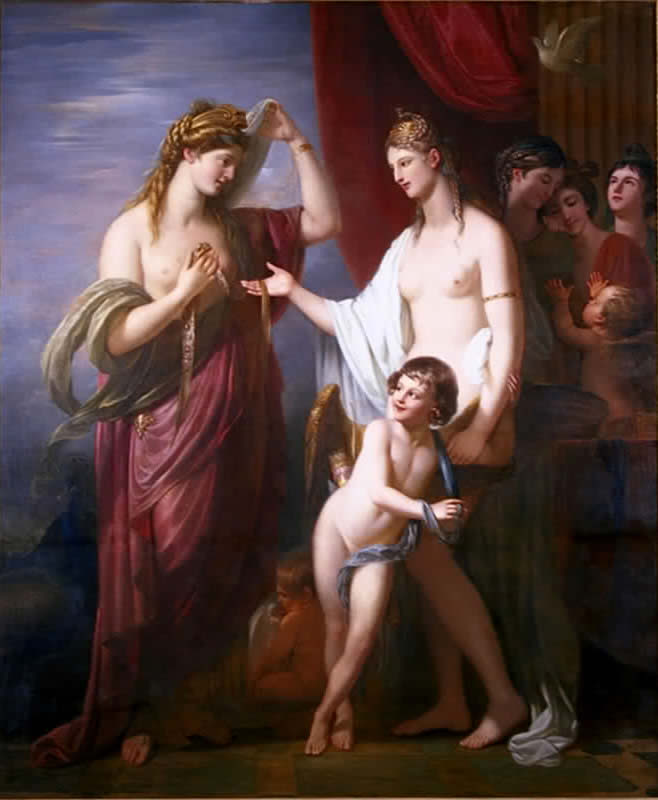
Juno Borrowing the Girdle of Venus by Benjamin West

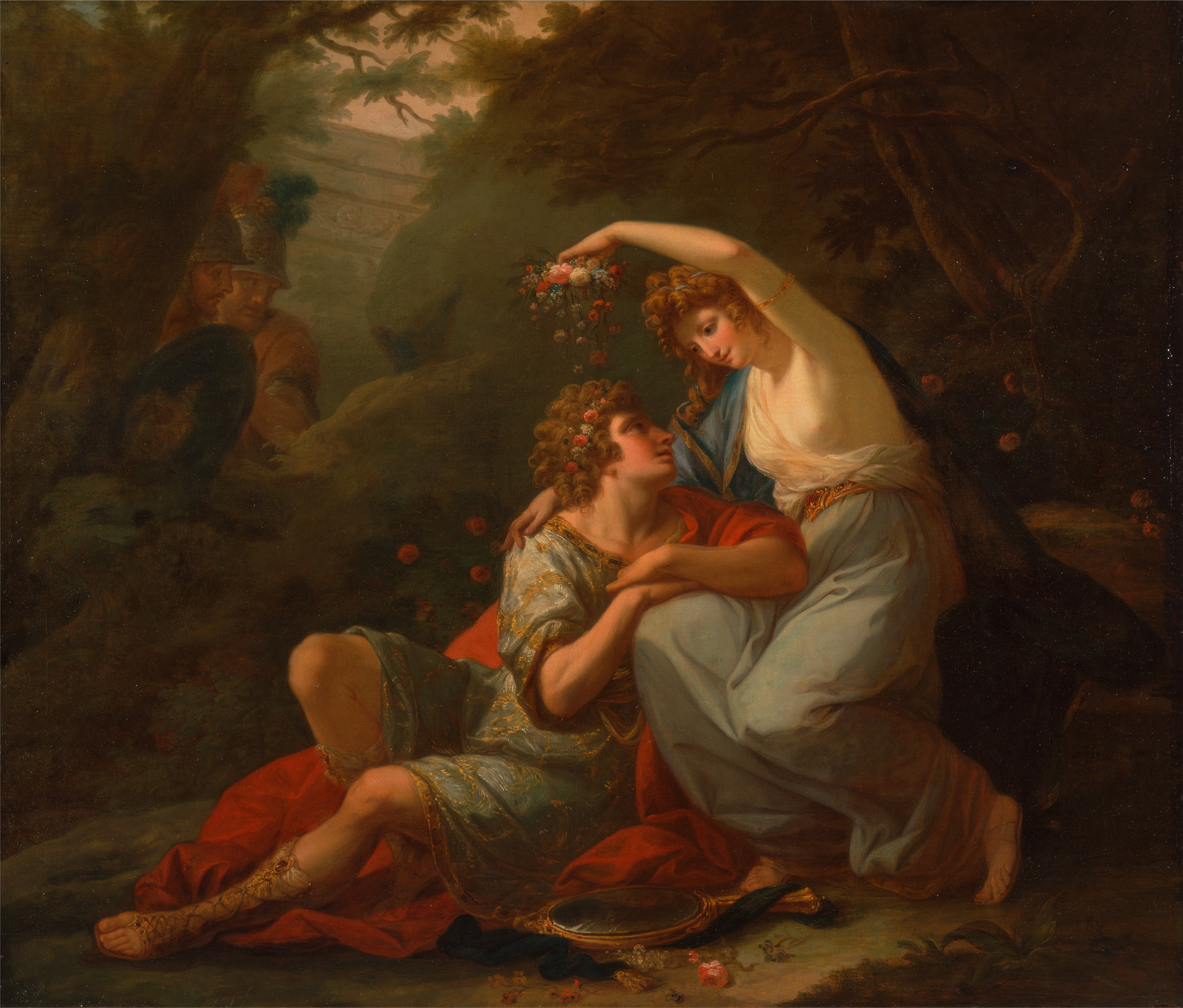
Rinaldo and Armida by Angelica Kauffman

== See also ==
- Royal Academy Exhibition of 1771, the previous year's edition

== Bibliography ==
- Alexander, David S. Angelica Kauffman: A Continental Artist in Georgian England. 1992.
- Fordham, Douglas. British Art and the Seven Years' War: Allegiance and Autonomy. University of Pennsylvania Press, 2010.
- Hamilton, James. Gainsborough: A Portrait. Hachette UK, 2017.
- Hargreaves, Matthew. Candidates for Fame: The Society of Artists of Great Britain, 1760-1791. Paul Mellon Centre for Studies in British Art, 2005.
- Kenny, Shirley Strum (ed.) British Theatre and the Other Arts, 1660-1800. Associated University Presses, 1984.
- McIntyre, Ian. Joshua Reynolds: The Life and Times of the First President of the Royal Academy. Allen Lane, 2003.
- McNairn, Alan. Behold the Hero: General Wolfe and the Arts in the Eighteenth Century. McGill-Queen's Press, 1997
