= Great Pulteney Street =

Street in Bath, England

Coordinates: 51°23′04″N 2°21′15″W

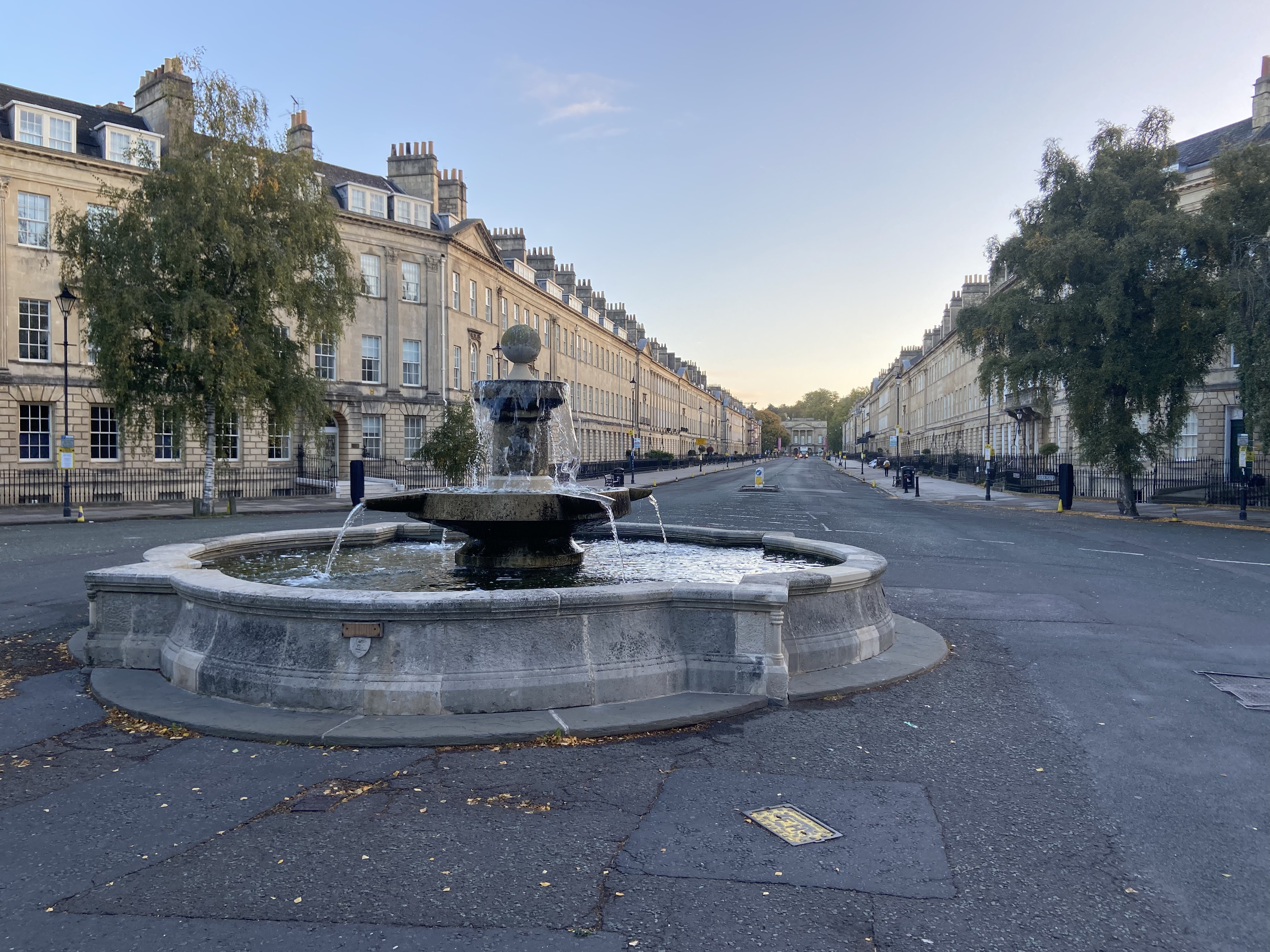
A view down Great Pulteney Street from Laura Place fountain

Great Pulteney Street is a grand thoroughfare that connects Bathwick on the east of the River Avon with the City of Bath, England via the Robert Adam designed Pulteney Bridge. Viewed from the city side of the bridge the road leads directly to the Holburne Museum of Art that was originally the Sydney Hotel where tea rooms, card rooms, a concert room and a ballroom were installed for the amusement of Bath's many visitors.

== History ==
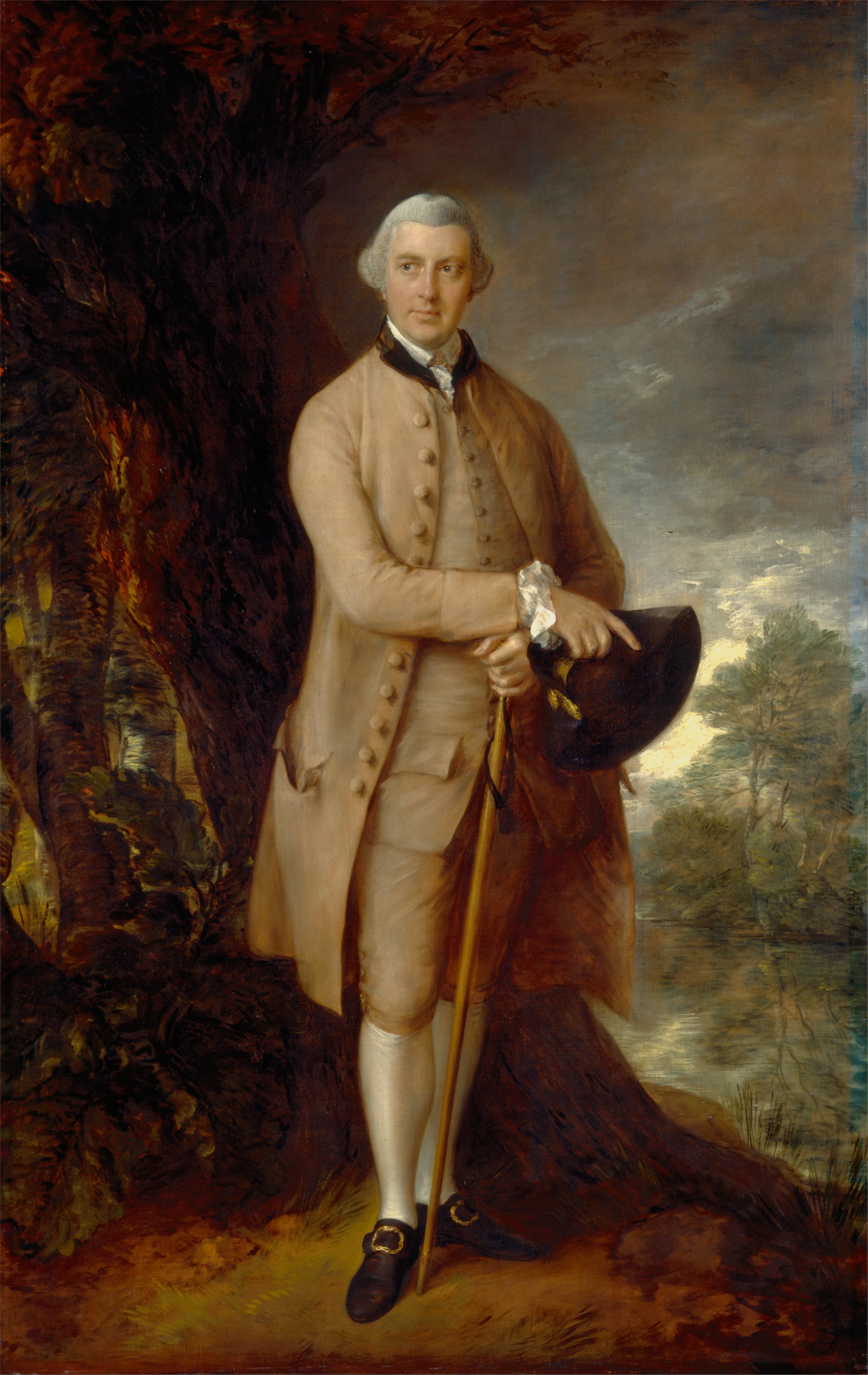
Portrait of Sir William Pulteney by Thomas Gainsborough

Commissioned by Sir William Pulteney, it was designed by the architect Thomas Baldwin and completed in 1789. The Corporation of Bath wanted to expand the boundaries of the city, and Sir William's estate was conveniently situated just over the other side of the River Avon.

At over 1,000 feet (300 m) long and 100 feet (30 m) wide, the road itself is the widest and the grandest in Bath. However, the architect, Baldwin, designed only the façades of buildings. A variety of owners acquired plots of land along the new street and built the actual structures behind the façades, so that while the street has a visual external unity, the buildings have different internal features, some having been designed as private houses and others as hotels. Numbers 1 to 7 were a single government office, now designated as a Grade I listed building. Numbers 41A and 42 to 77 have also been Grade I listed.

It was foreseen that, along with the access provided by Pulteney Bridge, the eastern side of the Avon would become popular with speculators and developers. This appears not to have been the case, and in the event no further developments were made on this scale. Indeed, one of the side streets off Great Pulteney Street, called Sunderland Street, is the shortest street in the city, with only one address. After 1789, the financial climate did not encourage further building, as the Panic of 1797, related to a period of deflation between 1793 and 1800, was followed by the Napoleonic Wars and the Depression of 1807. Bath was also affected by a serious flood in 1809, which would have inundated the basements in Great Pulteney Street as well as the surrounding fields.

When first built, the street was lined with trees, which in autumn caused some problems with leaf litter. When asked to solve this problem the town council opted to simply cut most of the trees down. In aerial photos held by Historic England it can be seen that the trees were present from at least 1920 until 1953. The adjacent Laura Place had a much smaller number of trees which still remain.

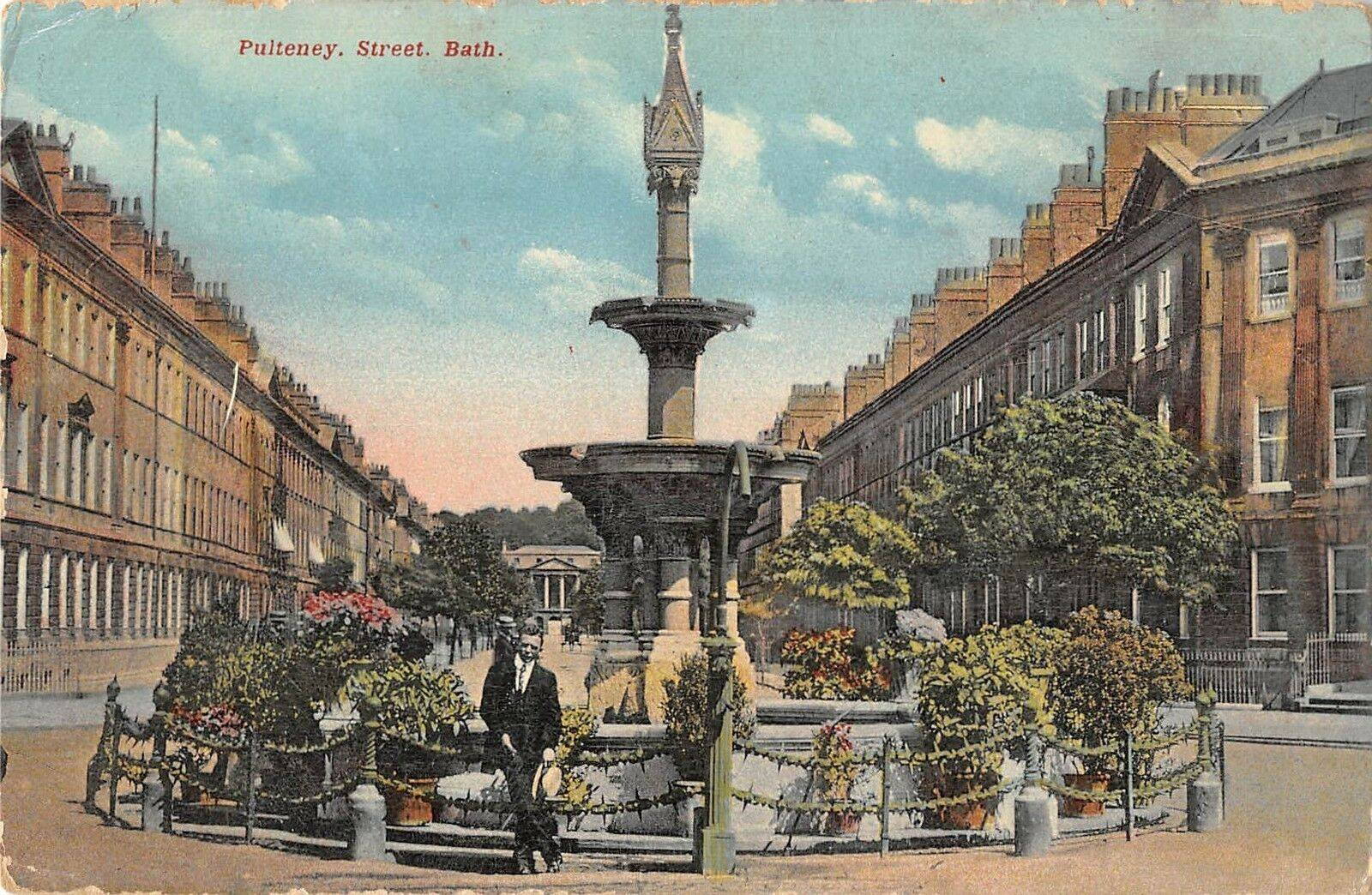
Centrepiece of the original Laura place fountain

The fountain area (also known as Laura Place) was initially not part of the original plan. After completion of the main street in 1877, local residents petitioned and successfully raised significant funds to build a grand column (rather like Nelson's Column in London). However, as construction of the column started, the residents realised that the addition would tower over the area (it would be 50% taller than the houses), and so they then petitioned for it to be cancelled. After some negotiations, the (half-built) column was pulled down and the much smaller fountain added instead. The centrepiece of the original Laura place fountain was damaged beyond repair during freshers' week in 1969 and replaced with a modern design in 1970.

Drawings of all the building plans (including many proposals that were never built) can be viewed in the Victoria Art Gallery situated on the corner of Pulteney Bridge and the Grand Parade.

In light of the Black Lives Matter movement in 2020, there has been some discussion of renaming the street in The Bath Magazine and in Bath Newseum, but so far no local consultation on this has actually started.

== Architecture ==
The planning and frontage of the entire street was done by the architect Thomas Baldwin but construction of individual buildings was done by a number of local contractors. This system of town planning was also used at the nearby Royal Crescent. In all major dimensions there is considerable conformity, the width and height of buildings and the size and spacing of windows all adhere to a grid pattern.

However a closer look will reveal many subtle differences:

- The pattern of stone rustication on the ground floor.
- The width and height of the front door.
- The height of the front door relative to the street – the street is built on a slight north–south slope and this is accommodated by a couple of extra steps on one side of the street.
- The width and position of the entrance path, some have space on the left and/or right hand side of the entrance for sedan chairs.
- The size and shape of Transoms and windows above each front door.
- The access stair and door position for the basement entrance (if any).
- Roman style engaged columns at the end of some blocks.
- Drain pipes from the roof – some of these are enclosed within the brick frontage, others are visible as black cast iron downpipes.
- Overthrows over the doorways for oil or gas street lights, these are all later additions, none were present in 1874
- In a few cases the height of the second floor windows.
- The number and position of attic level dormer windows.
- The presence or absence of stone or iron balconies.
- The house numbers painted above each door – these are mostly white paint on a black background, two distinct styles of sign writing are used – one a thin art deco style and the other a thicker more 1930's cursive.

The above points can be verified by examining the photographs of each building available on Wikimedia commons.

The pavement in Great Pulteney has mostly been replaced with modern reconstituted stone paving slabs, many of the surrounding streets (e.g. Sydney Place) still have the original solid stone flags. One notable feature in the pavement that has been preserved is the coal hole in front of each building.

Great Pulteney Street was intended to form the centre of a much larger geometrical layout of grand streets, squares and circuses. However, the scheme by Thomas Baldwin to create a whole new town south of the river was hit by financial panic as a result of the French Revolution and the collapse of many banks – including the one funding Baldwin's grand plans.

In 2018 the majority of the front doors on the street are painted white. This is unlikely to have been the original finish as when new the grain and colour of wood was very much admired and was often left uncovered with just a sealing coat of varnish. As the original woodwork aged or became damaged the varnish would typically be replaced with an oil based brown or dark green paint.

The numbering of the houses skips over the number 13, but there is a 10a and 10b.

== Former notable residents ==
The below is a list of notable residents who have either lived on Great Pulteney Street or stayed there for an amount of time:

- Napoleon III, former President and Emperor of France
- William Wilberforce, an anti-slavery campaigner
- Earl Howe, naval officer known for his service in the American Revolutionary War
- Hannah More, poet and playwright
- Edward Bulwer-Lytton, politician and author
- William Smith, geologist

== Gallery ==
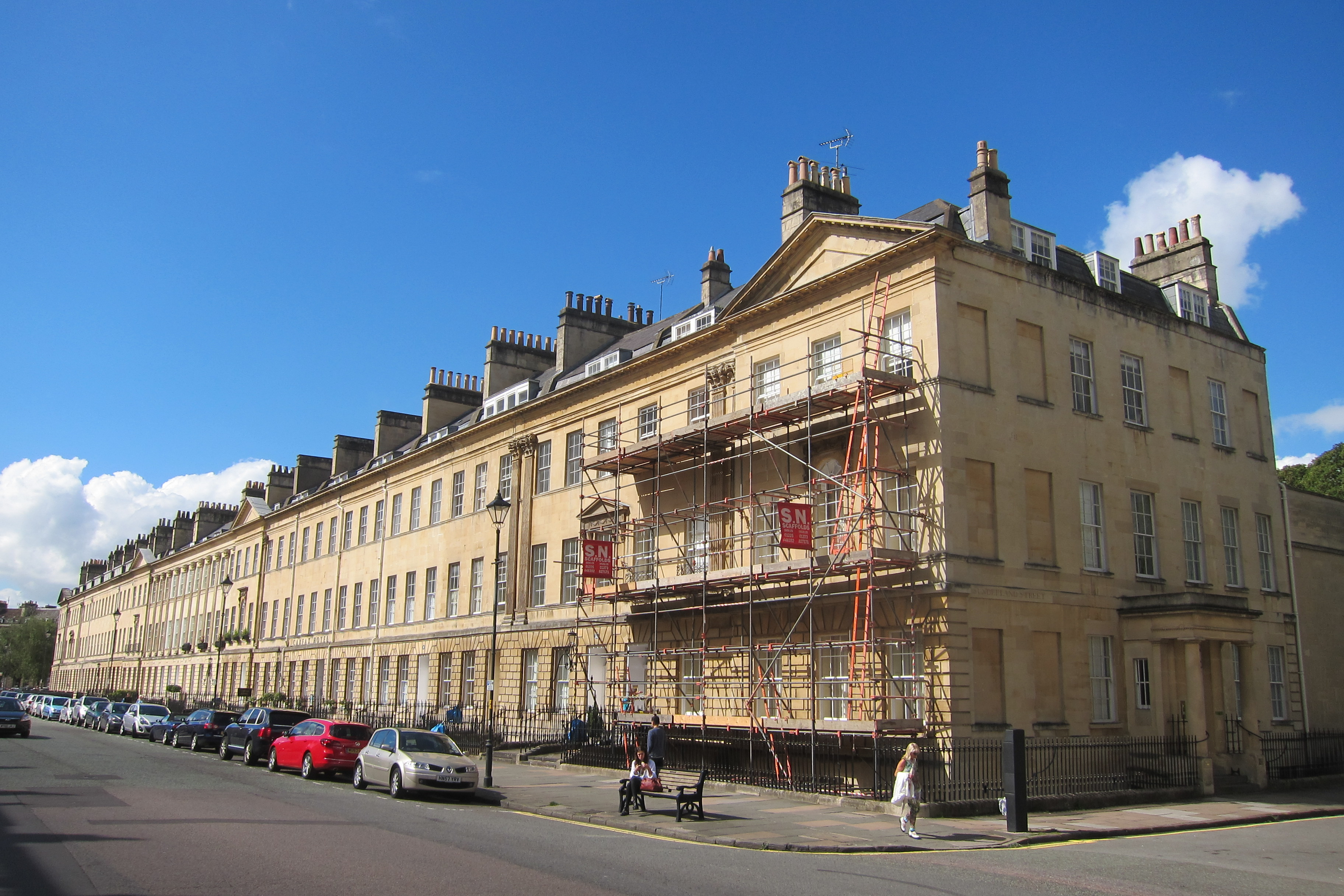
8-20 Great Pulteney Street

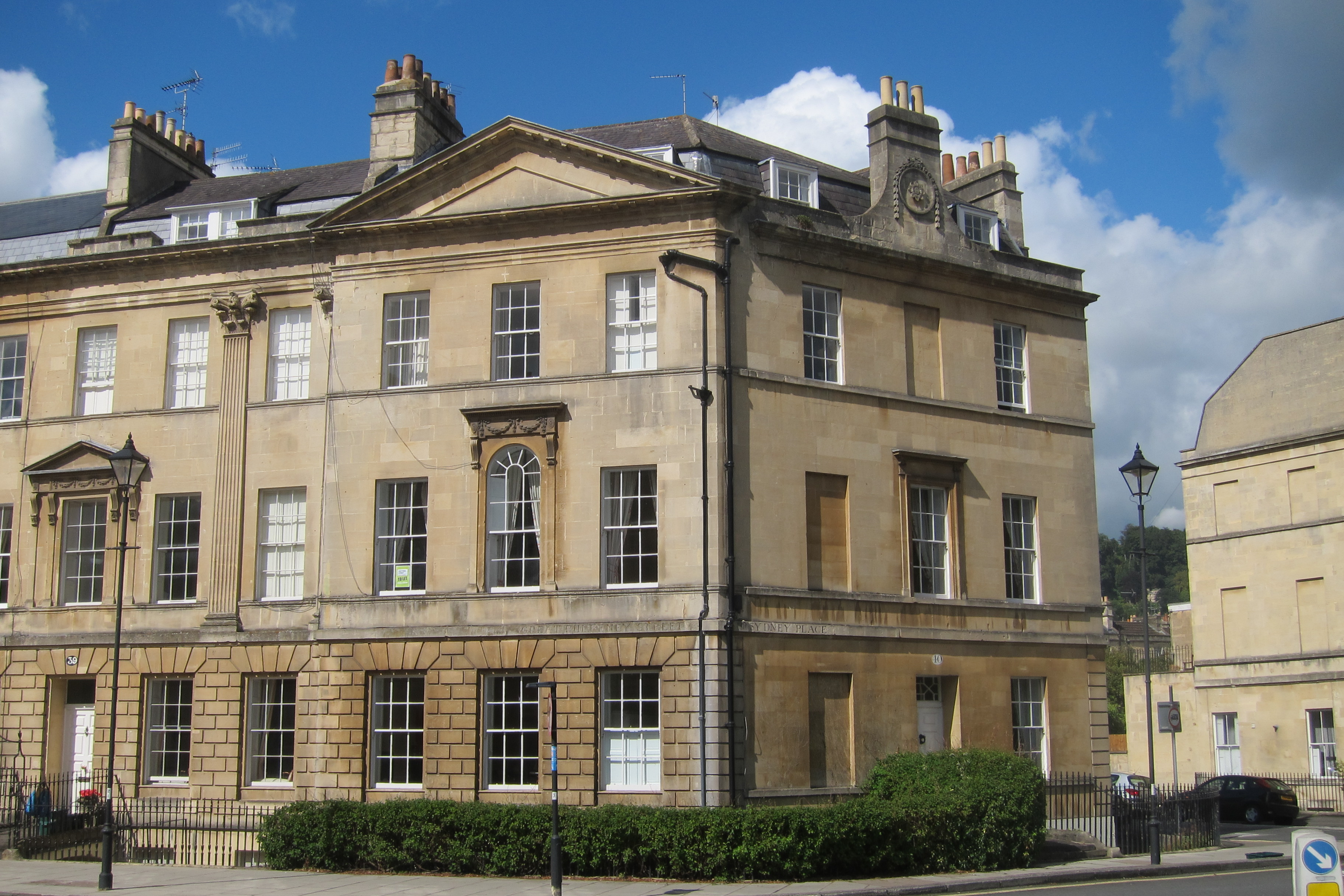
40 Great Pulteney Street

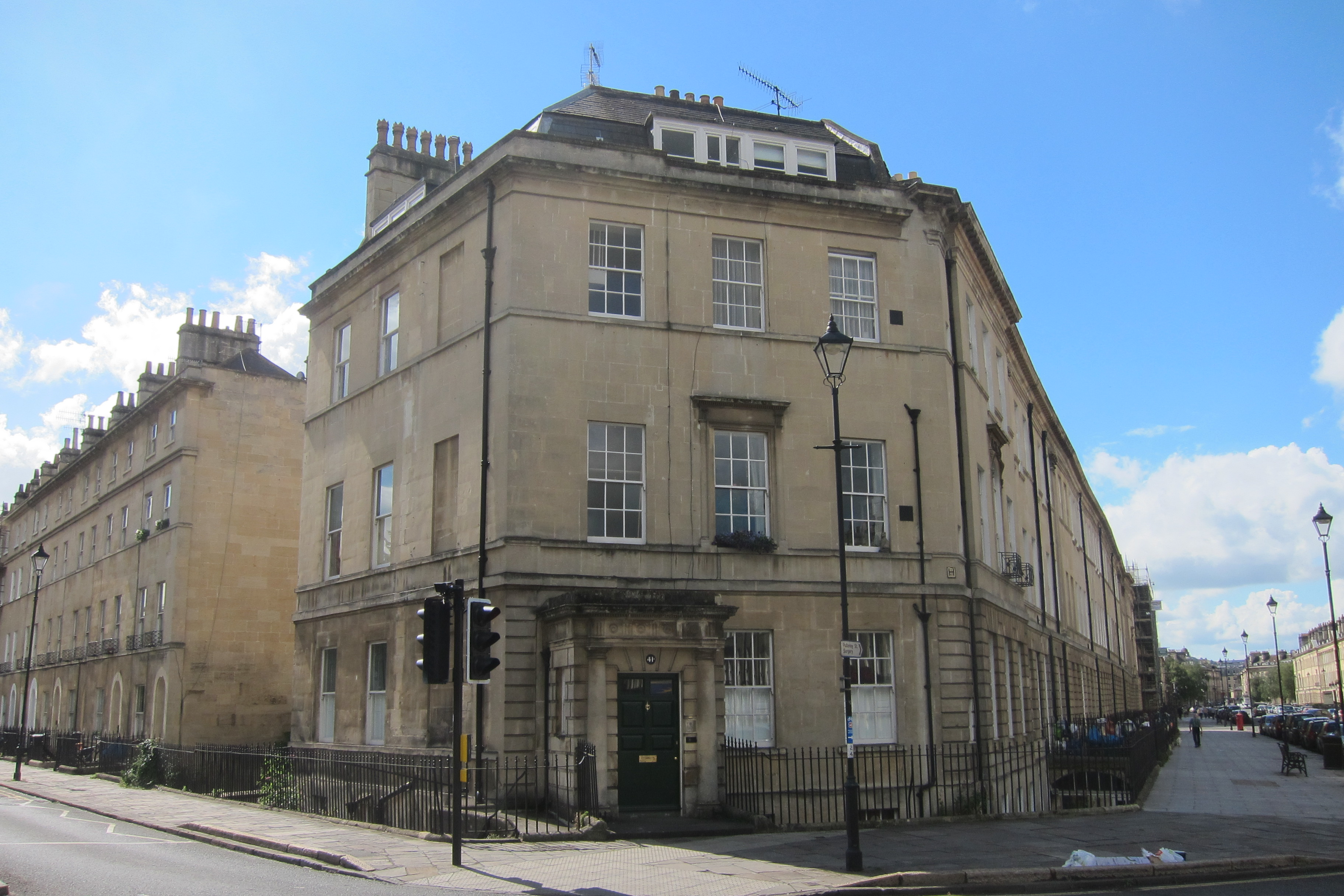
41A Great Pulteney Street

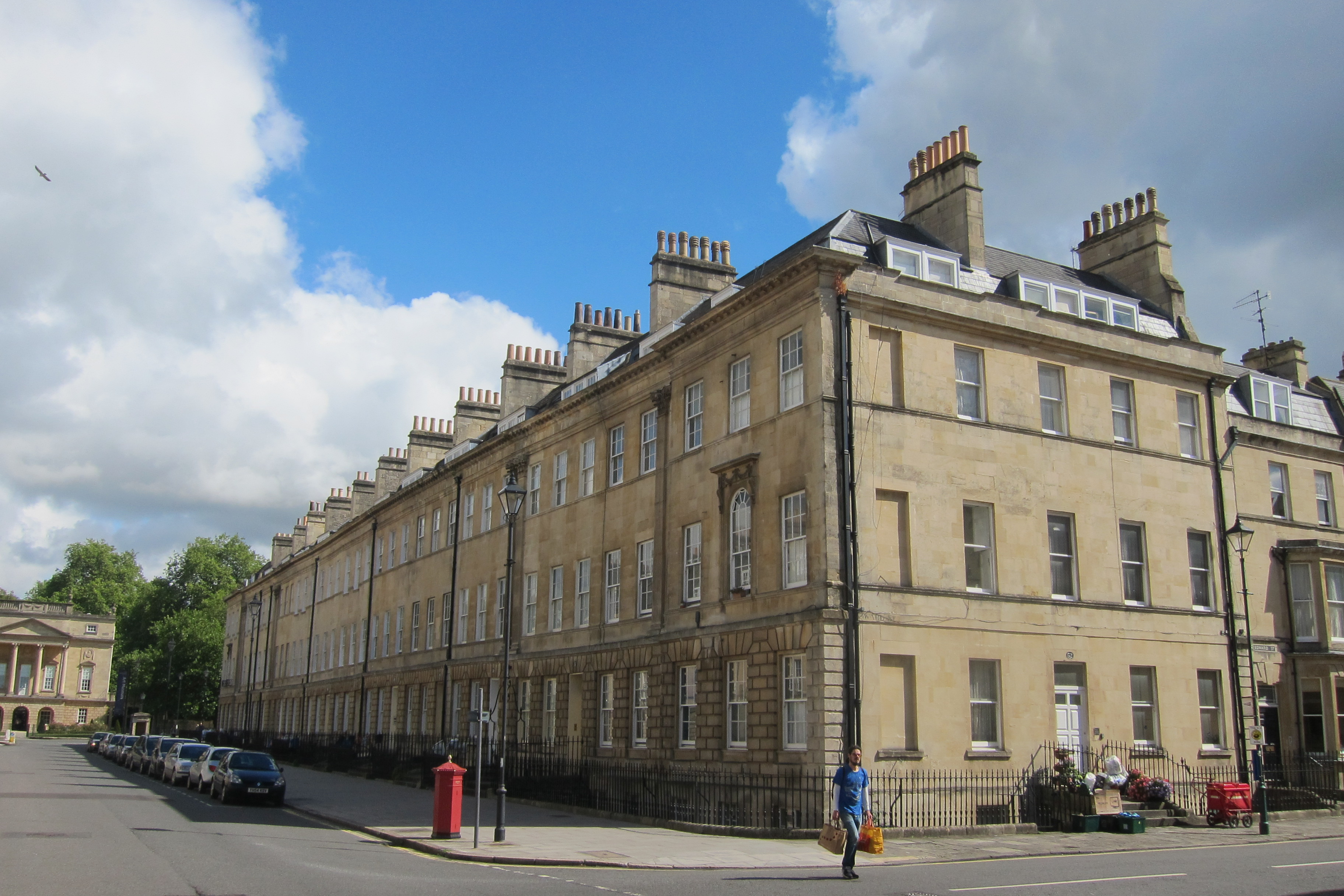
42-52 Great Pulteney Street

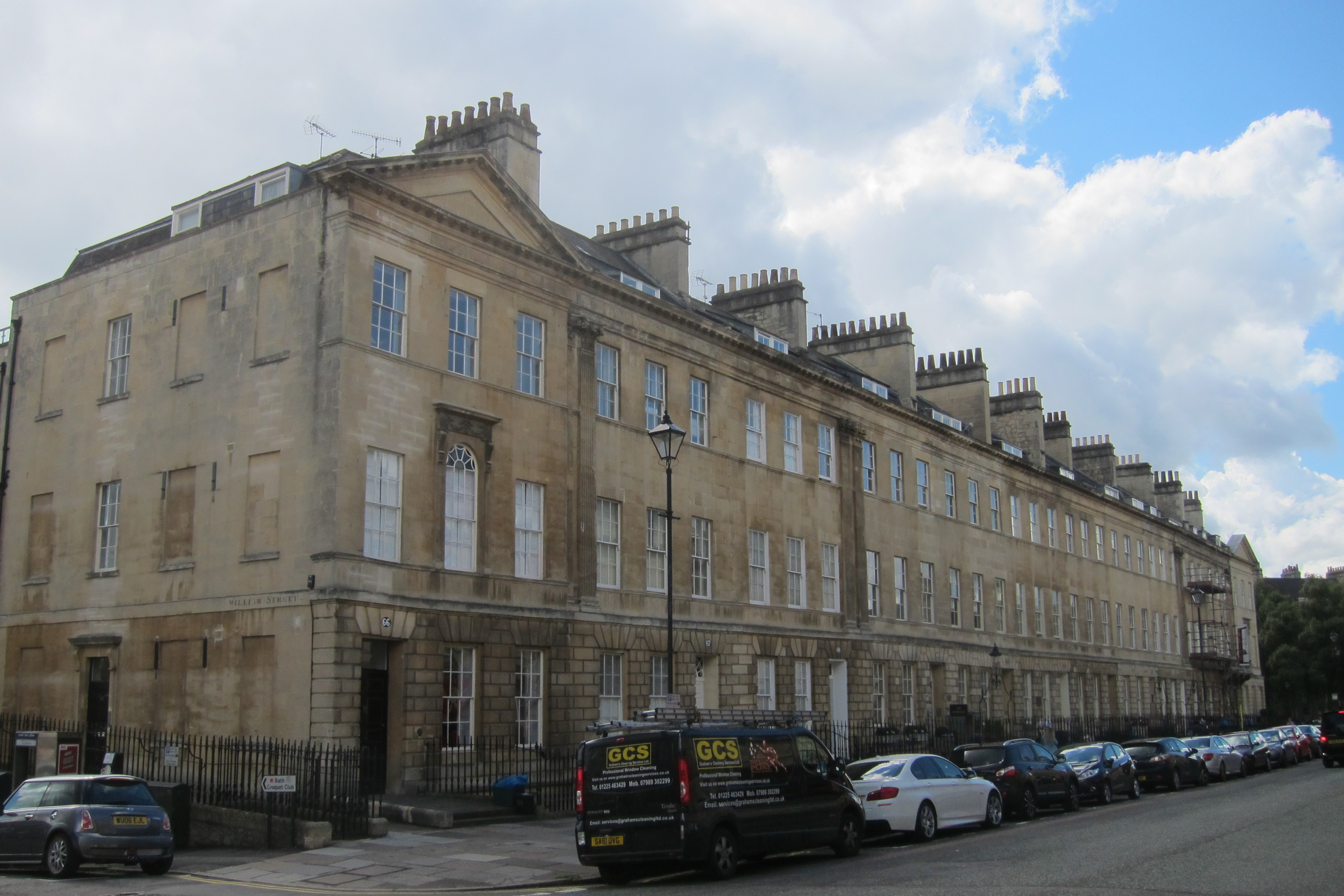
66-77 Great Pulteney Street
