= The Shipwreck (Vernet) =

Painting by Claude-Joseph Vernet

- Artist: Claude-Joseph Vernet
- Year: 1772
- Type: Oil on canvas
- Dimensions: 113.5 cm × 162.9 cm (44.7 in × 64.1 in)
- Location: National Gallery of Art; Washington D.C.

The Shipwreck is an oil on canvas maritime painting by the French artist Claude-Joseph Vernet, from 1772. It is held at the National Gallery of Art, in Washington, D.C..

== History and description ==
Amidst a storm a ship is being wrecked on a rocky coastline. Crew members and passengers attempt to save themselves by climbing down a rope from the Mast to the shore. It was a forerunner of Romanticism, a contrast to the ascendant Neoclassicism of the era.

It was commissioned by the English art collector Lord Arundell of Wardour for his country house Wardour Castle in Wiltshire. Today the painting is in the collection of the National Gallery of Art, in Washington D.C.. His grandson Horace Vernet borrowed stylistically from the painting for his homage to his grandfather Joseph Vernet Tied to a Mast During a Storm, exhibited at the Salon of 1822 at the Louvre.

== Bibliography ==
- Brooks, Susie. Romanticism. Capstone, 2019.
- Frank, Svenja (ed.) 9/11 in European Literature: Negotiating Identities Against the Attacks and What Followed. Springer, 2017.
- Harkett, Daniel & Hornstein, Katie (ed.) Horace Vernet and the Thresholds of Nineteenth-Century Visual Culture. Dartmouth College Press, 2017.
