= Joaquín Bernardo Rubert =

Spanish painter

Joaquín Bernardo Rubert (1772–1817) was a Spanish painter, active in Valencia and mainly painting still life floral arrangements.
