= An Iron Forge =

Painting by Joseph Wright of Derby

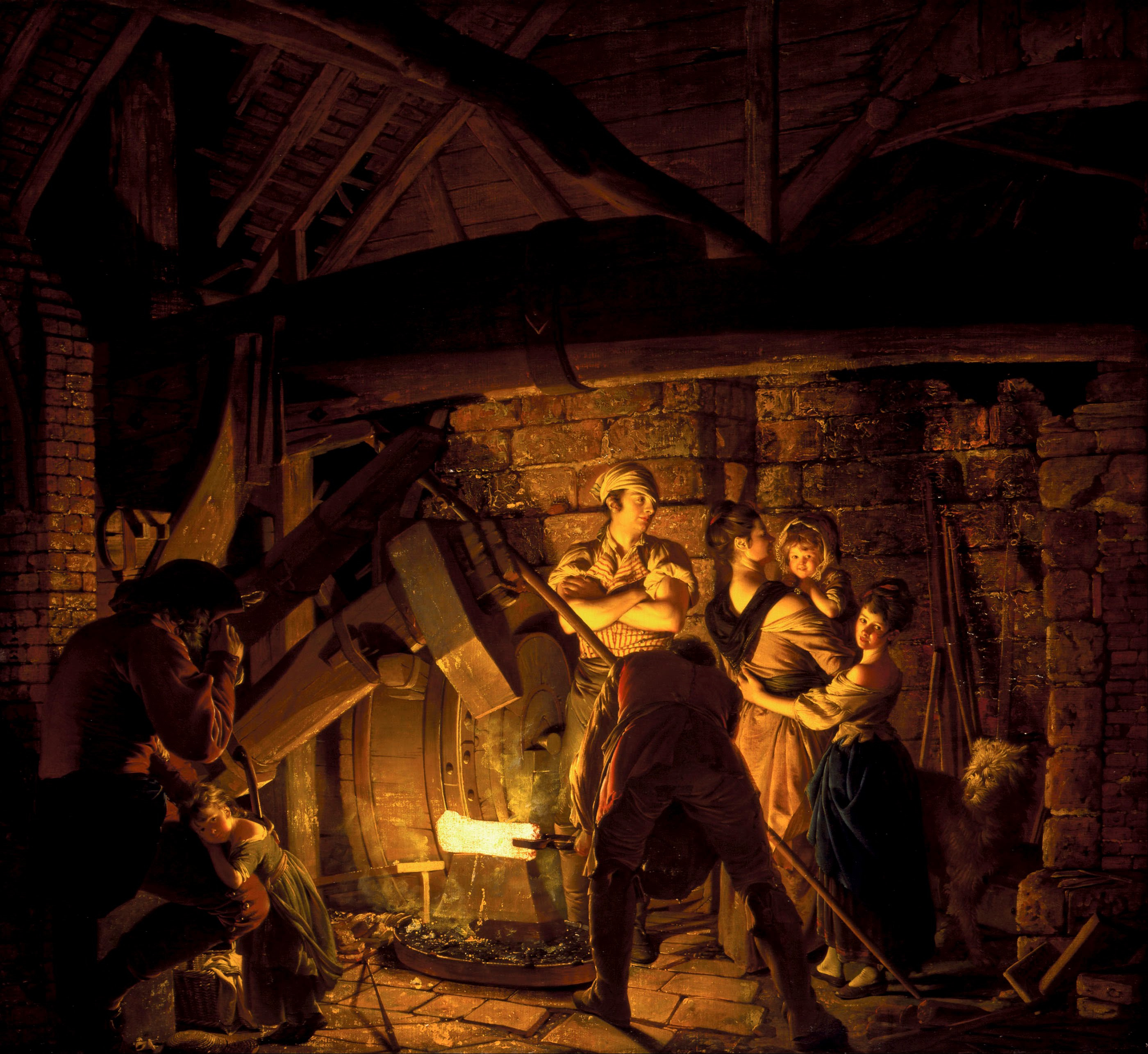
- Artist: Joseph Wright of Derby
- Year: 1772
- Type: Oil on canvas, genre painting
- Dimensions: 121.3 cm × 132 cm (47.8 in × 52 in)
- Location: Tate Britain, London

An Iron Forge is a 1772 genre painting by the British artist Joseph Wright of Derby. It was part of a series of five paintings featuring a blacksmith's shop that Wright produced between 1771 and 1773. Although much of Wright's work focuses on the Industrial Revolution, this painting focuses on a more traditional form of smaller blacksmith. It does feature several modern devices such as water-powered trip hammer. The painting featured in the 1772 exhibition of the Society of Artists of Great Britain in the Strand. Today it is in the collection of the Tate Britain in Pimlico, having been purchased in 1992 with assistance from National Heritage Memorial Fund, the art Fund and the Friends of the Tate Gallery. An engraving of the painting was produced by Richard Earlom in 1773.

== Bibliography ==
- Klingender, Francis Donald. Art and the Industrial Revolution. A. M. Kelley, 1970.
- Leeder, Mike. Measures for Measure: Geology and the Industrial Revolution. Liverpool University Press, 2020.
- Poplawski, Paul (ed.) English Literature in Context. Cambridge University Press, 2017.
