= Portrait of Sir William Pulteney =

1772 painting by Thomas Gainsborough

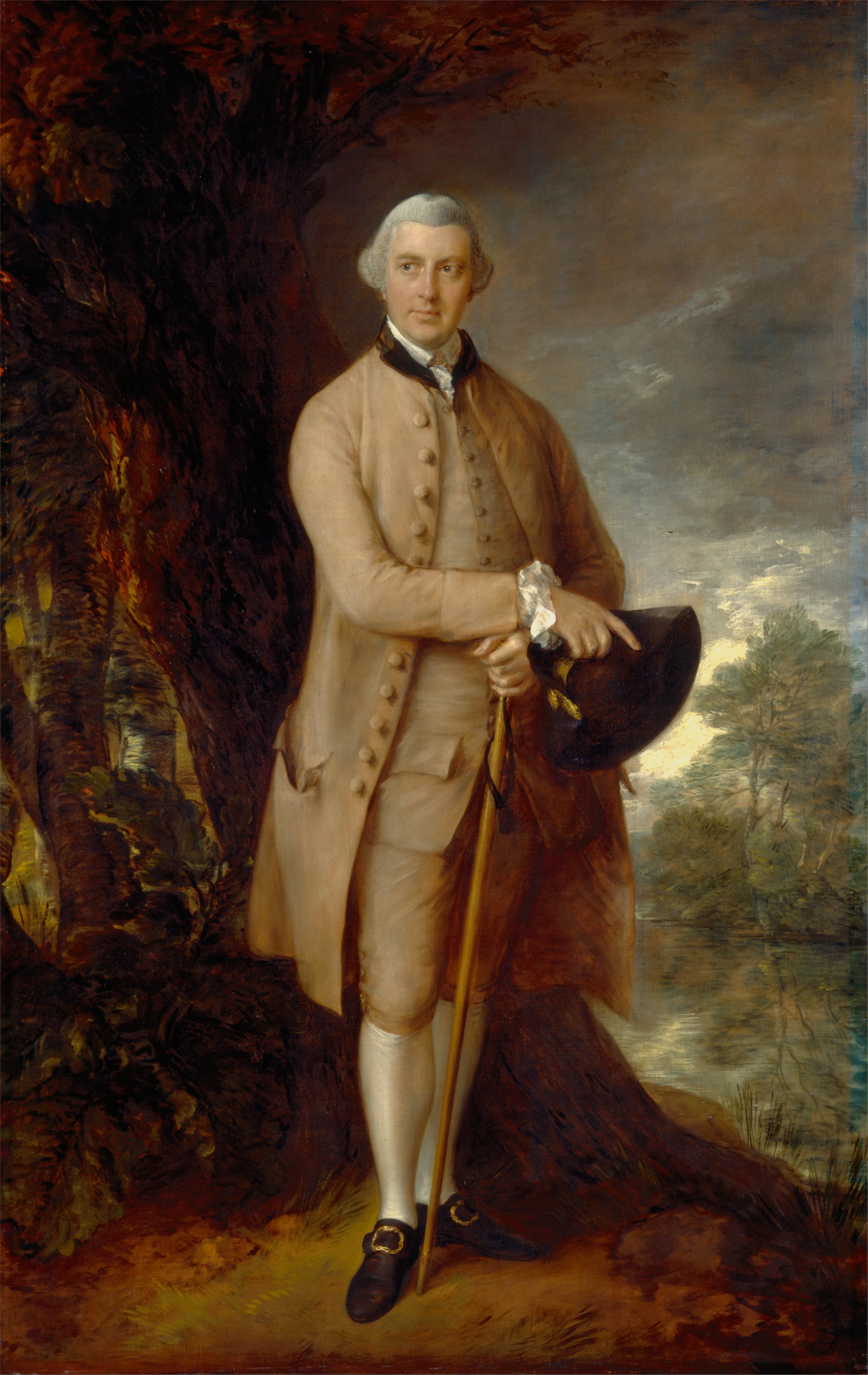
- Artist: Thomas Gainsborough
- Year: 1772
- Type: Oil on canvas, portrait painting
- Dimensions: 237.5 cm × 149.9 cm (93.5 in × 59.0 in)
- Location: Yale Center for British Art, New Haven

Portrait of Sir William Pulteney is an oil on canvas portrait painting by the English artist Thomas Gainsborough, from 1772. It depicts the British politician and landowner Sir William Pulteney, 5th Baronet. A major figure in eighteenth-century Bath he commissioned the construction of Pulteney Bridge and Great Pulteney Street. It was painted when Gainsborough was based in Bath, before his move to London in 1774. It was exhibited at the Exhibition of 1772, the annual exhibition of the Royal Academy in Pall Mall. The painting is now in the Yale Center for British Art, in New Haven, as part of the Paul Mellon Collection.

== Bibliography ==
- Hamilton, James. Gainsborough: A Portrait. Hachette UK, 2017.
- Lindsay, Jack. Thomas Gainsborough: His Life and Art. Granada, 1981.
- Waterhouse, Ellis Kirkham. Gainsborough. Spring Books, 1966.
