= Pulteney Bridge =

Bridge over the River Avon in Bath, England

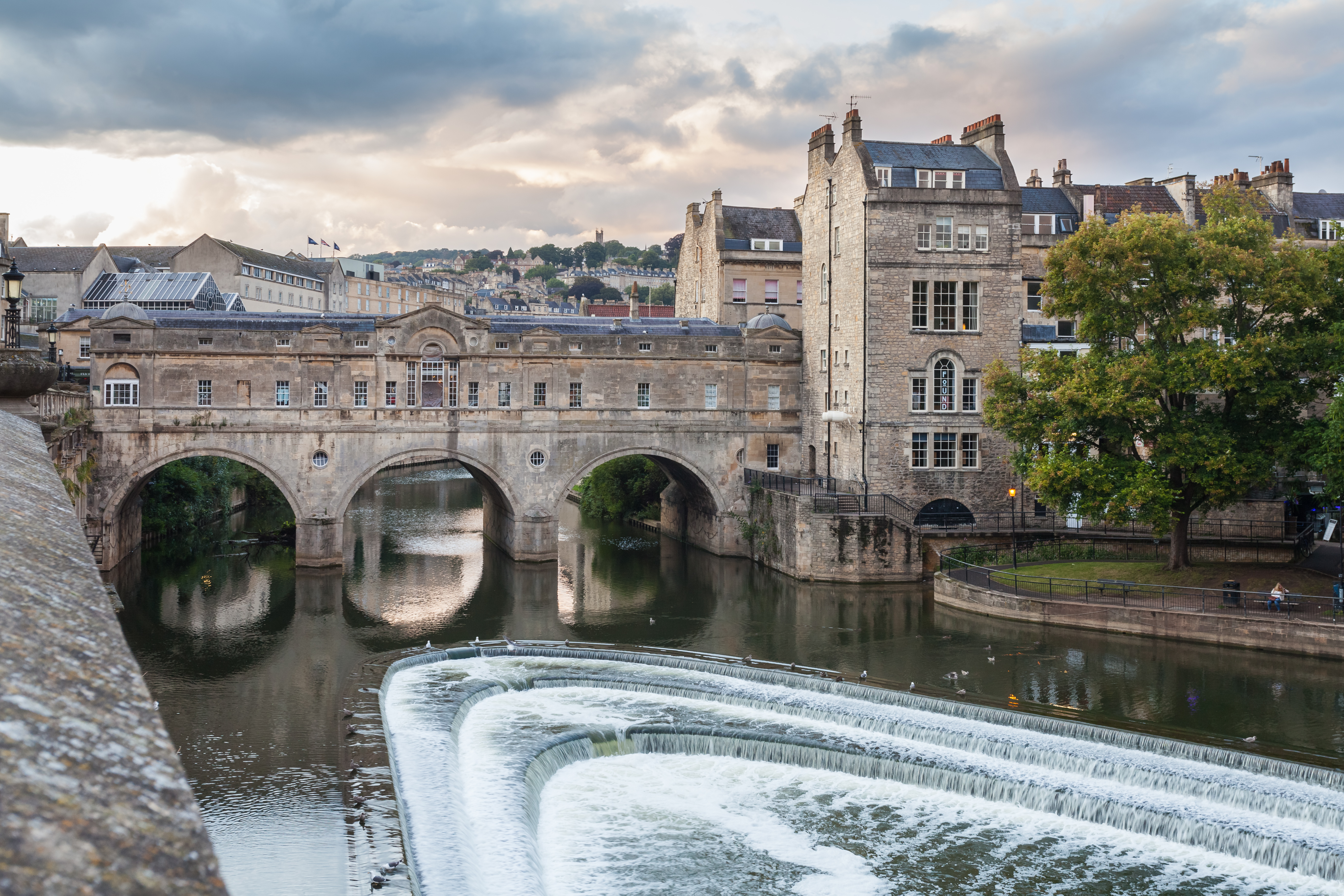
- Pulteney Bridge in 2014
- Coordinates: 51°22′59″N 2°21′28″W
- Carries: Buses, taxis, cyclists, pedestrians
- Crosses: River Avon
- Locale: Bath
- Maintained by: Bath and North East Somerset

Characteristics
- Design: Arch bridge
- Material: Bath stone
- Total length: 45 metres (148 ft)
- Width: 18 metres (58 ft)
- No. of spans: 3
- Piers in water: 2

History
- Designer: Robert Adam
- Constructed by: Reed and Lowther (bridge); Singers and Lankeshere (shops)
- Construction start: 1769 (257 years ago)
- Construction end: 1774 (252 years ago)

Location
- Interactive map of Pulteney Bridge

Pulteney Bridge is a bridge over the River Avon in Bath, England. It was completed by 1774, and connected the city with land in Bathwick which Sir William Pulteney and his family wished to develop. Designed by Robert Adam in a Palladian style, it is one of only four bridges in the world to have shops across its full span on both sides. It has been designated as a Grade I listed building. The bridge is named after Frances Pulteney, wife of the Scottish lawyer and politician Sir William Pulteney, 5th Baronet. Frances was a first cousin once removed of William Pulteney, 1st Earl of Bath. She inherited the Earl's substantial fortune in Somerset after his death in 1764. The rural Bathwick estate, which Frances and William inherited in 1767, was across the river from the city and could be reached only by ferry. William made plans to create a new town, which would become a suburb to the historic city of Bath, but first he needed a better river crossing.

Within 20 years of its construction, alterations were made that expanded the shops and changed the façades. By the end of the 18th century, it had been damaged by floods, but was rebuilt to a similar design. Over the next century alterations to the shops included cantilevered extensions on the bridge's north face. In the 20th century, several schemes were carried out to preserve the bridge and partially return it to its original appearance, enhancing its appeal as a tourist attraction.

The bridge is now 45 metres (148 ft) long and 18 metres (58 ft) wide. Although there have been plans to pedestrianise the bridge, it is still used by buses and taxis. The much photographed bridge and weir below are close to the centre of the city, a World Heritage Site, renowned for its Georgian architecture.

== Background ==
The bridge is named after Frances Pulteney, wife of Sir William Pultney. He was a wealthy Scottish lawyer and member of Parliament (MP). Frances was the third daughter of MP and government official Daniel Pulteney (1684–1731) and first cousin once removed of William Pulteney, 1st Earl of Bath. She inherited the earl's substantial fortune and estates close to Bath in Somerset after his death in 1764 and that of his younger brother and heir in 1767, and the Johnstones changed their surname to Pulteney. The rural Bathwick estate, which Frances and William inherited in 1767, was across the river from the city and could be reached only by ferry. William made plans to create a new town, which would become a suburb to the historic city of Bath, but first he needed a better river crossing. The work of the Pulteneys is memorialised by Great Pulteney Street in Bathwick, and Henrietta Street and Laura Place there, named after their daughter Henrietta Laura Johnstone.

== Design and construction ==
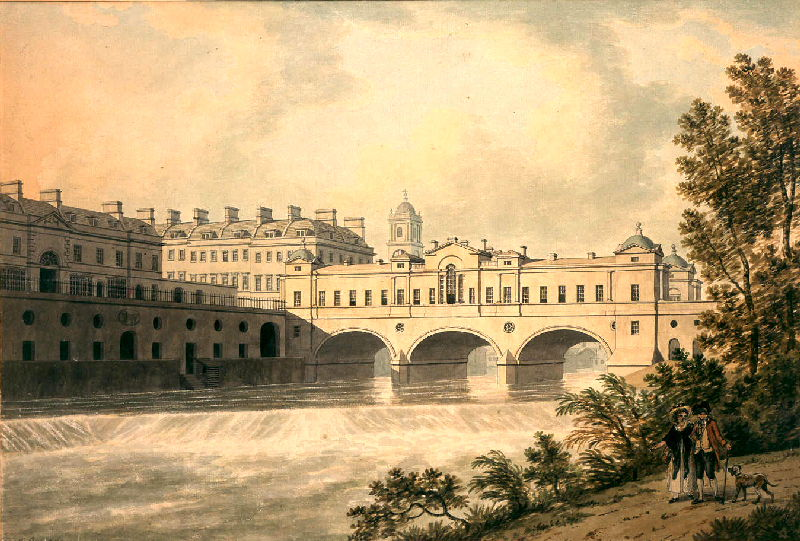
Pulteney Bridge by Thomas Malton in 1785

Pulteney Bridge was designed by Robert Adam, whose original drawings are preserved in the Sir John Soane's Museum in London. It is one of only four bridges in the world to have shops across its full span on both sides, the others being Ponte Vecchio in Florence and Rialto in Venice, and the Krämerbrücke in Erfurt, Germany.

Initial plans for the bridge were drawn up by Thomas Paty, who estimated it would cost £4,569 to build, without the shops. A second estimate of £2,389 was obtained from local builders John Lowther and Richard Reed; it included two shops at each end of the bridge, but work neither design began before winter weather made construction of the pillars impossible. In 1770 the brothers Robert and James Adam, who were working on designs for the new town at Bathwick, adapted Paty's original design. Robert Adam envisaged an elegant structure lined with shops, similar to the Ponte Vecchio and the Ponte di Rialto he would likely have seen when he visited Florence and Venice. Adam's design more closely followed Andrea Palladio's rejected design for the Rialto. The revised bridge was 15 metres (50 ft) wide, rather than the 9.1 metres (30 ft) width envisaged by Paty, which overcame the objections of the local council about the bridge being too narrow.

Construction started in 1769 and was completed by 1774 at a cost of £11,000. The builders for the lower part of the bridge were local masons Reed and Lowther; the shops were constructed by Singers and Lankeshere.

== Development ==
Pulteney Bridge stood for less than 20 years in the form that Adam created. In 1792 alterations were made during which the bridge was widened to 18 metres (58 ft) and the shops enlarged, converting the original sixteen shops into six larger ones. Floods in 1799 and 1800 wrecked the north side of the bridge, which had been constructed with inadequate supporting piling works. A temporary bridge was erected, and repairs were completed in 1804. Thomas Telford suggested replacing the bridge with a single span cast iron bridge. However it was rebuilt by John Pinch senior, surveyor to the Pulteney estate, in a less ambitious version of Adam's design. Nineteenth-century shopkeepers changed the structure and appearance of their premises by changing windows, or expanding them by adding cantilevers over the river. Some painted advertisements on the outside of their shops, affecting the view from the river and Grand Parade. The western end pavilion on the south side was demolished in 1903 for road widening and its replacement was not an exact match.

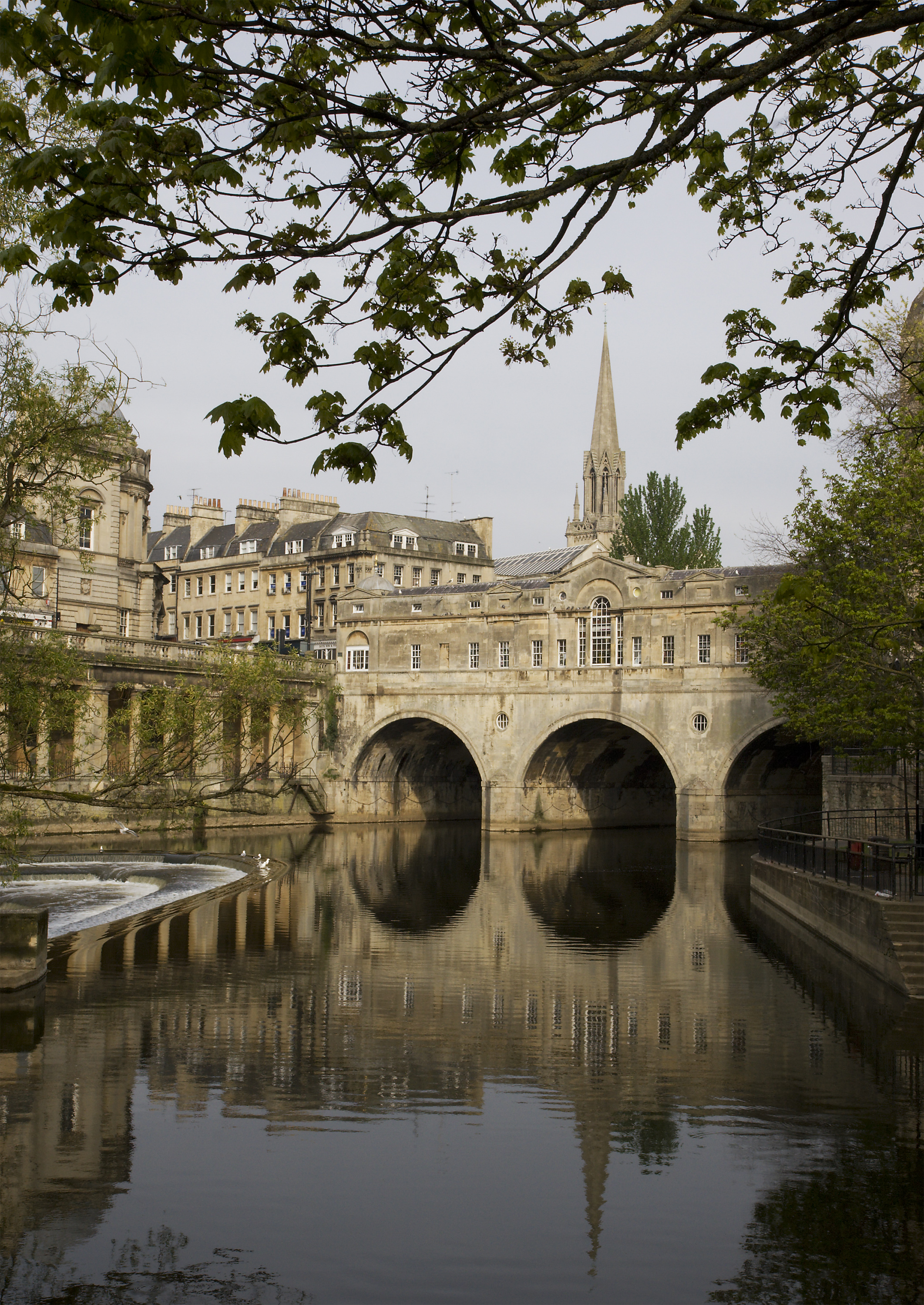
Pulteney Bridge in 2007

In 1936 the bridge was designated an ancient monument. The city council bought several of the shops and made plans for the restoration of the original façade, which was completed in time for the Festival of Britain in 1951. The status of the bridge as an ancient monument was replaced in 1955 with its designation as a Grade I listed building. Further work was carried out in the 1960s to repair the underside soffits of all three arches. More restoration of the southern street façade was needed in 1975.

In 2009 Bath and North East Somerset council put forward a proposal to close the bridge to motor traffic and convert it to a pedestrianised zone, but the plan was abandoned in September 2011. It however remains a large source of income for the council, due to it being the most fined bus lane in the city.

== Architecture ==
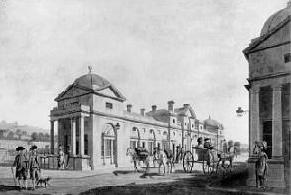
Pulteney Bridge in 1779 by Thomas Malton

The bridge features a narrow street flanked by two full length rows of shops designed in the Palladian style c. 1770. All sit above three segmental arches of equal span. The shops on the north side have cantilevered rear extensions. Consequently, the northern external façade of the bridge is asymmetrical, much altered and of no architectural merit, whereas the southern external side clearly shows the hand of Robert Adam.

Built of limestone, in classic Palladian style, the southern façade takes the form of a temple-like central bay with symmetrical wings connecting to two flanking, terminating pavilions. The central bay is given eminence by a broken-bed pediment supported by austere Doric pilasters. It in turn is flanked by two small bays, each with a small pointed pediment supported by shallow pilasters, which further emphasise and complement the central broken-bed pediment sitting above a large Palladian window – the focal point of the building. On this southern side the structure comprises a principal floor at street level, with a low mezzanine separated by stone banding above. Beneath the principal floor is a sub-floor constructed in the masonry between the spans of the bridge, its presence indicated by ocular windows placed symmetrically beneath the span of each arch. This ocular motif, on a reduced scale, is repeated symmetrically at mezzanine level beneath the central broken-bed pediment. The two terminating pavilions, in reality slight projections, have shallow saucer domes concealed behind their pointed pediments. The roof is pitched and of Welsh slate.

The western mid-stream pier was rebuilt in 1804. Further alteration took place in 1895, when the western pavilion was moved for the construction of the Grand Parade. The appearance changed yet again when the current weir, the scene of Javert's suicide in the film version of Les Misérables, was constructed between 1968 and 1972 as part of a flood-prevention scheme. Further restoration was undertaken in 1975.

== Gallery ==
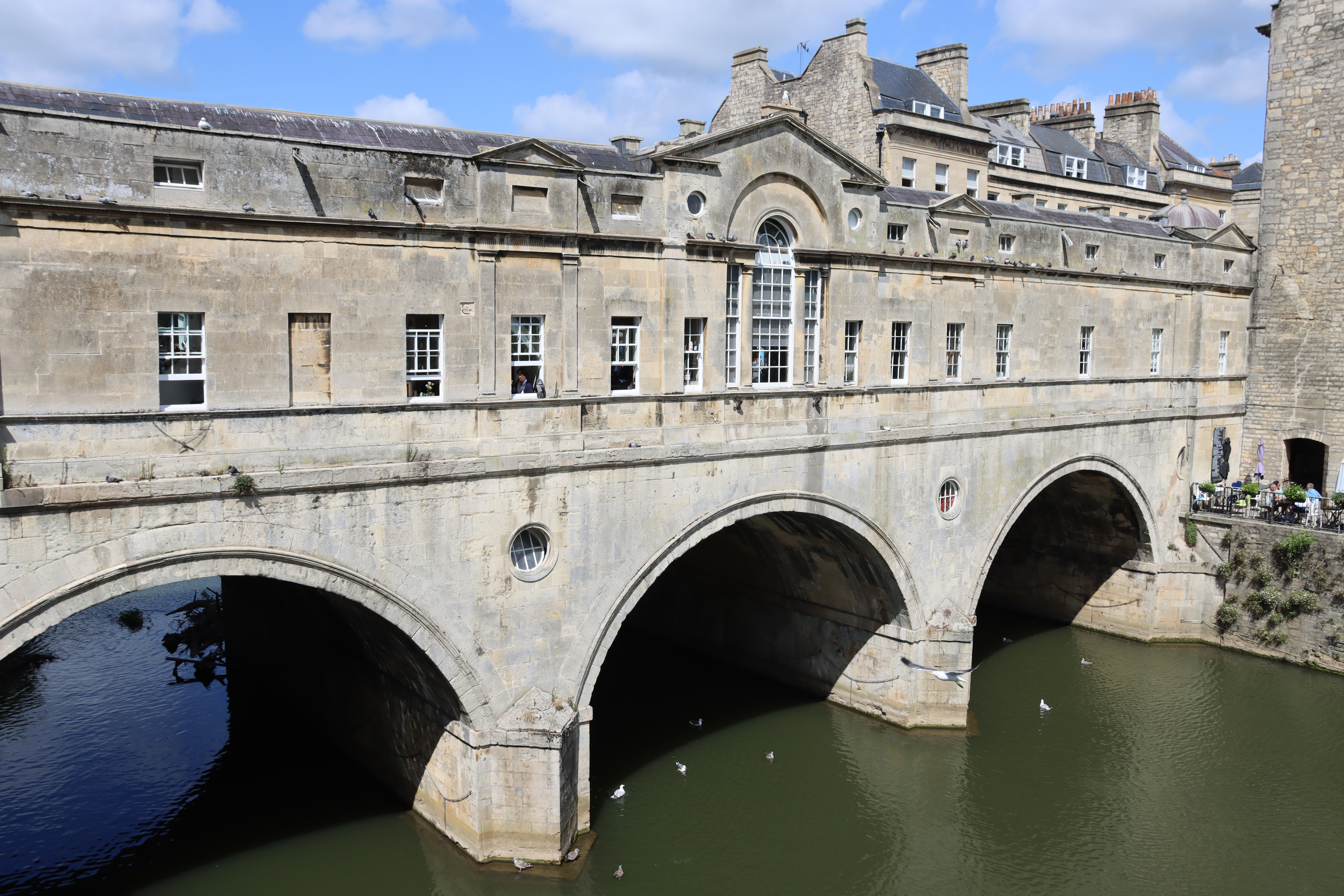
Pulteney Bridge in 2024

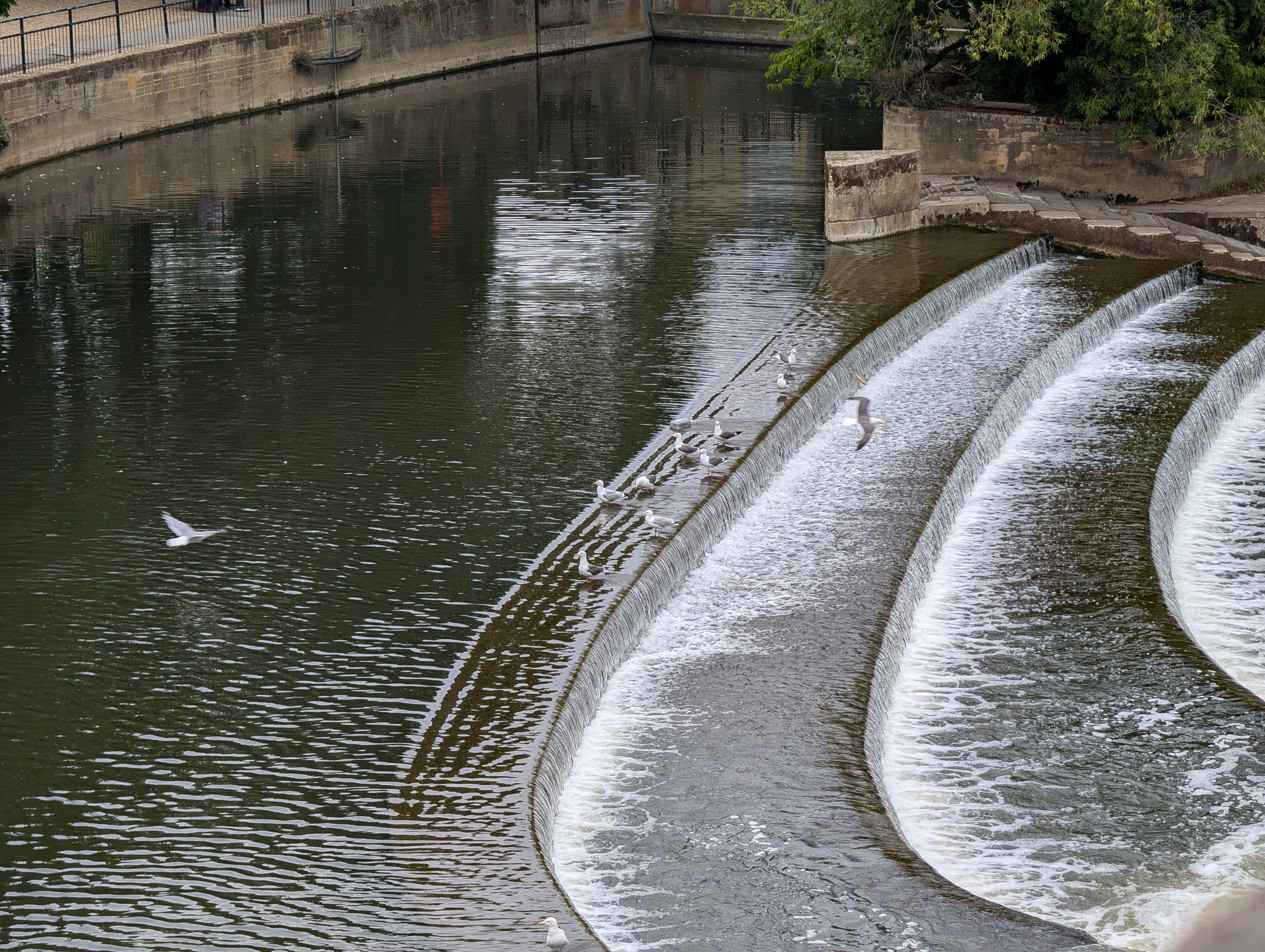
Weir near Pulteney Bridge in 2025

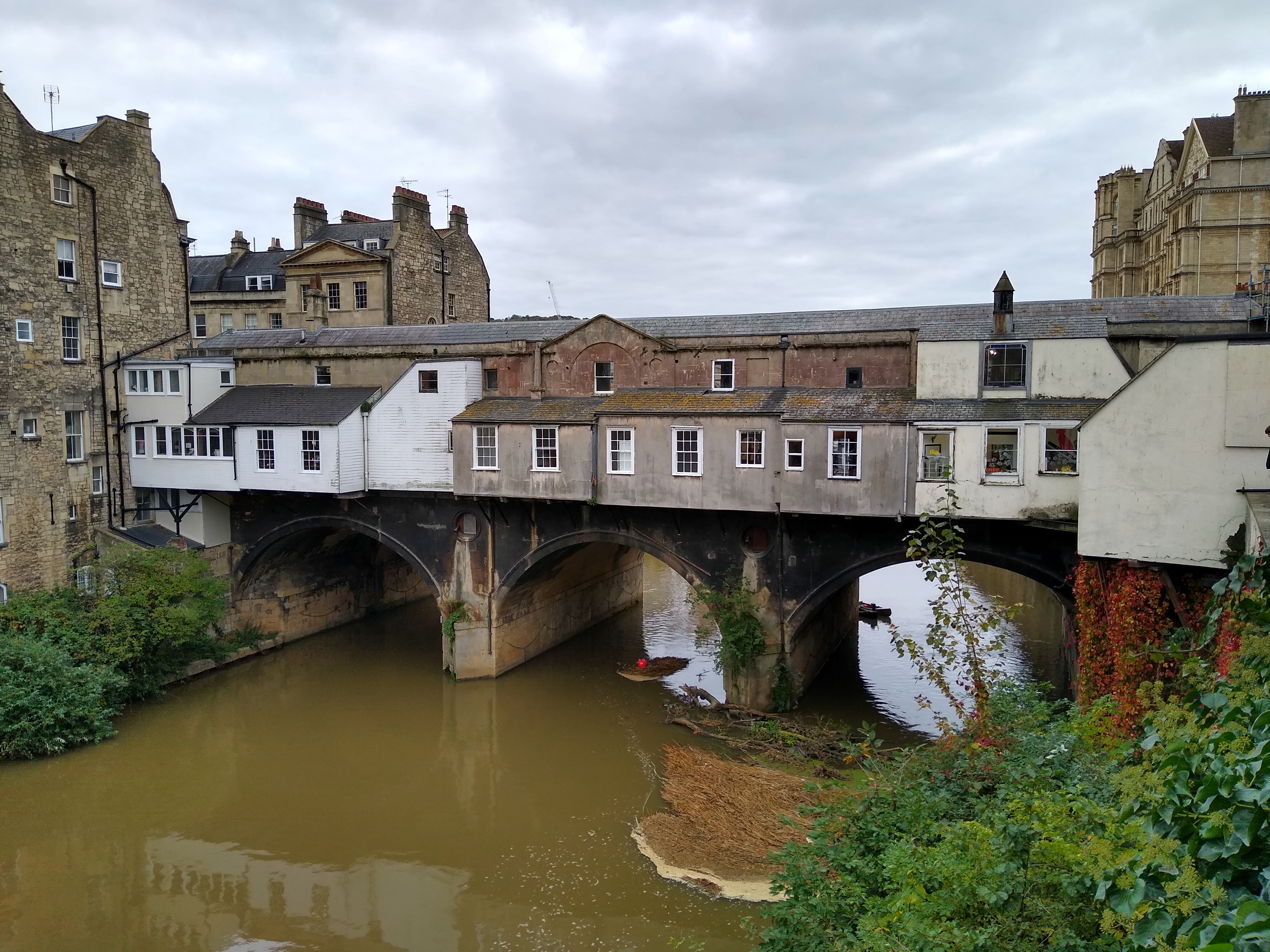
Cantilevered extensions on the north face

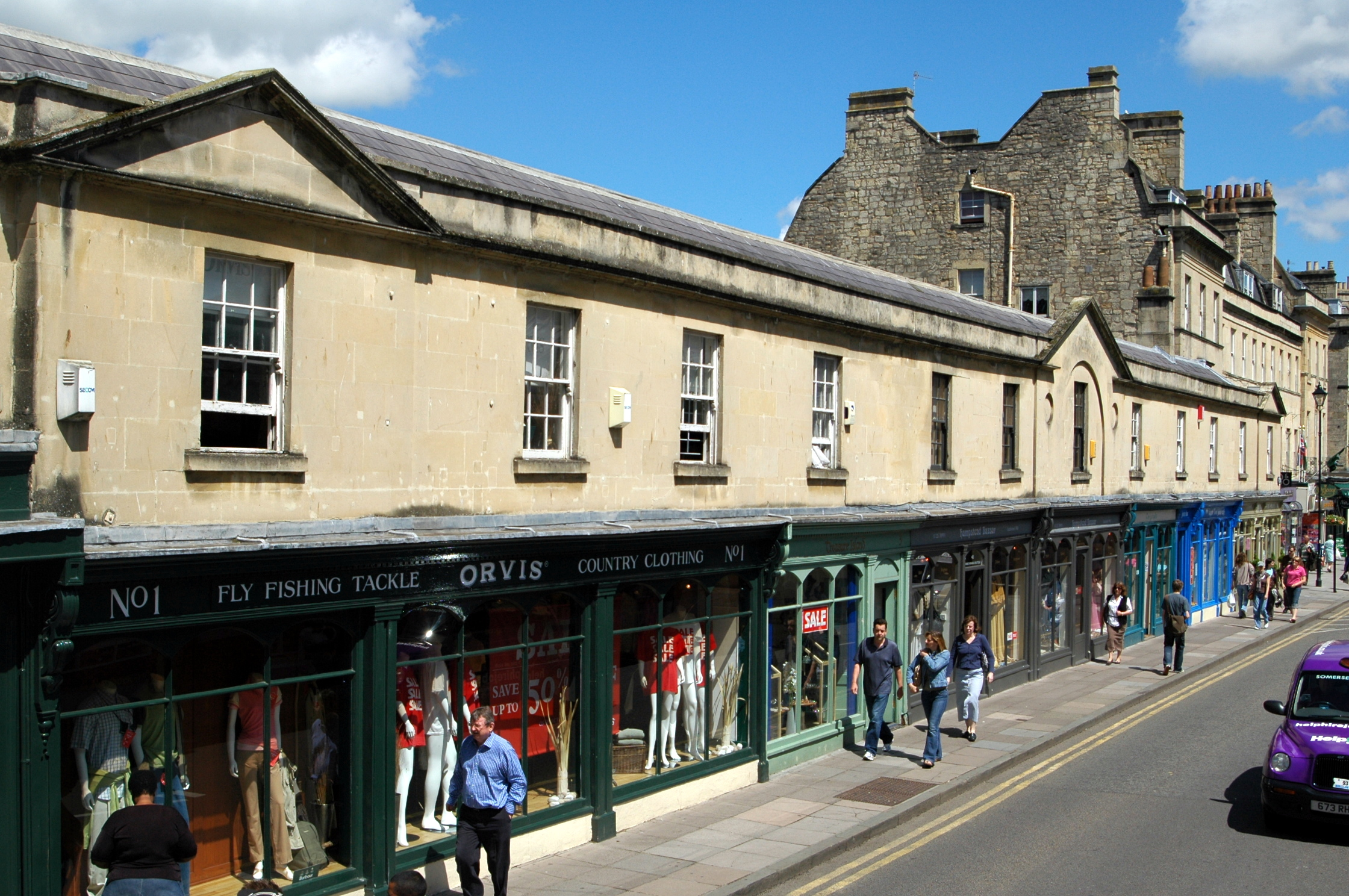
Shops on the north side

== See also ==
- Ponte Vecchio
- Krämerbrücke
- Rialto Bridge
- High Bridge
