= Society of Artists Exhibition of 1772 =

1772 art exhibition in London

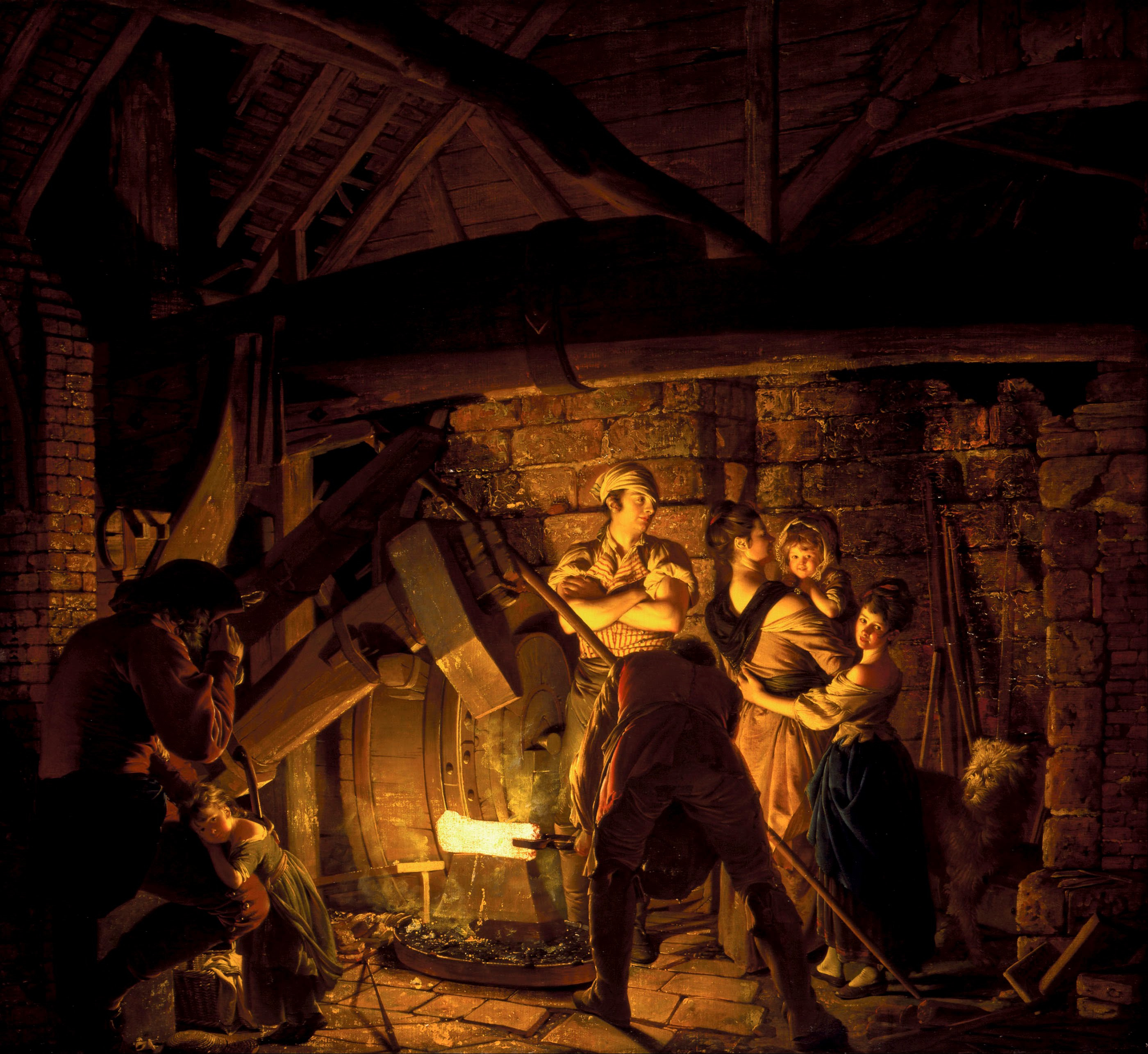
An Iron Forge by Joseph Wright of Derby, 1772

The Society of Artists Exhibition of 1772 was an art exhibition held in London by the Society of Artists of Great Britain. It took place between 13 May and 20 June 1772 at the Society's new headquarters in the Strand. The new building had been designed by the President, the architect James Paine at great expense.

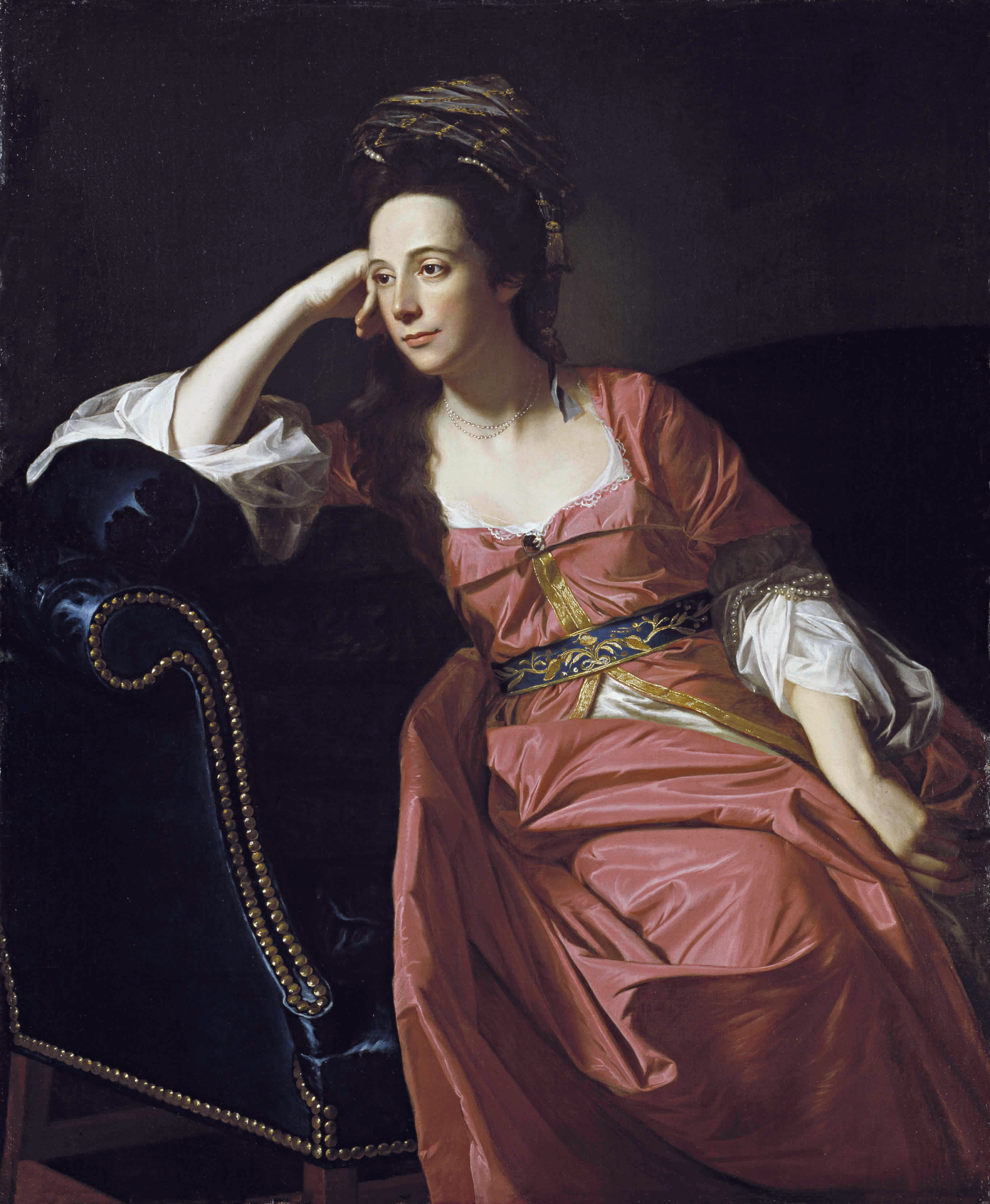
Portrait of Margaret Kemble Gage by John Singleton Copley

A total of 427 works featured in the catalogue. Paintings on display included the American artist John Singleton Copley's Portrait of Margaret Kemble Gage and An Iron Forge by Joseph Wright of Derby as well as works by William Marlow. The animal painter George Stubbs displayed one of his usual scenes featuring two racehorses as well as a history painting Hope Nursing Love. The fashionable portraitist George Romney exhibited two pictures.

The Society had suffered a major loss when a number of its members has left to form the Royal Academy of Arts in 1768. The Academy held its own rival Summer Exhibitions annually. The Royal Academy Exhibition of 1772 took place in Pall Mall from 24 April to 21 May, briefly overlapping with the Society's showpiece event. Although invited to attend the opening of the new headquarters of the Society, the committee of the Royal Academy turned the offer down. At the time the Academy was still renting a room in Pall Mall for its own exhibitions and wouldn't move to a permanent home at Somerset House until 1780. James Northcote wrote that the new Strand building "quite eclipses the Royal Academy".

A further large exhibition was held the following year. This included two Australian-themed paintings by Stubbs, who was elected the President in October 1772. Struggling to compete with the Academy, and suffering financial issues, the Society of Artists went into a sharp decline. The new headquarters were sold and exhibitions became less frequent. It eventually disbanded in 1791 and the Royal Academy went unchallenged until the establishment of the British Institution in 1805.

== Bibliography ==
- Barratt, Carrie Rebora . John Singleton Copley in America. John Singleton Copley in America. Metropolitan Museum of Art, 1995.
- Egerton, Judy. George Stubbs, Painter. Yale University Press, 2007.
- Hargreaves, Matthew. Candidates for Fame: The Society of Artists of Great Britain, 1760-1791. Paul Mellon Centre for Studies in British Art, 2005.
- McIntyre, Ian. Joshua Reynolds: The Life and Times of the First President of the Royal Academy. Allen Lane, 2003.
