= Philippe Bertrand =

French sculptor

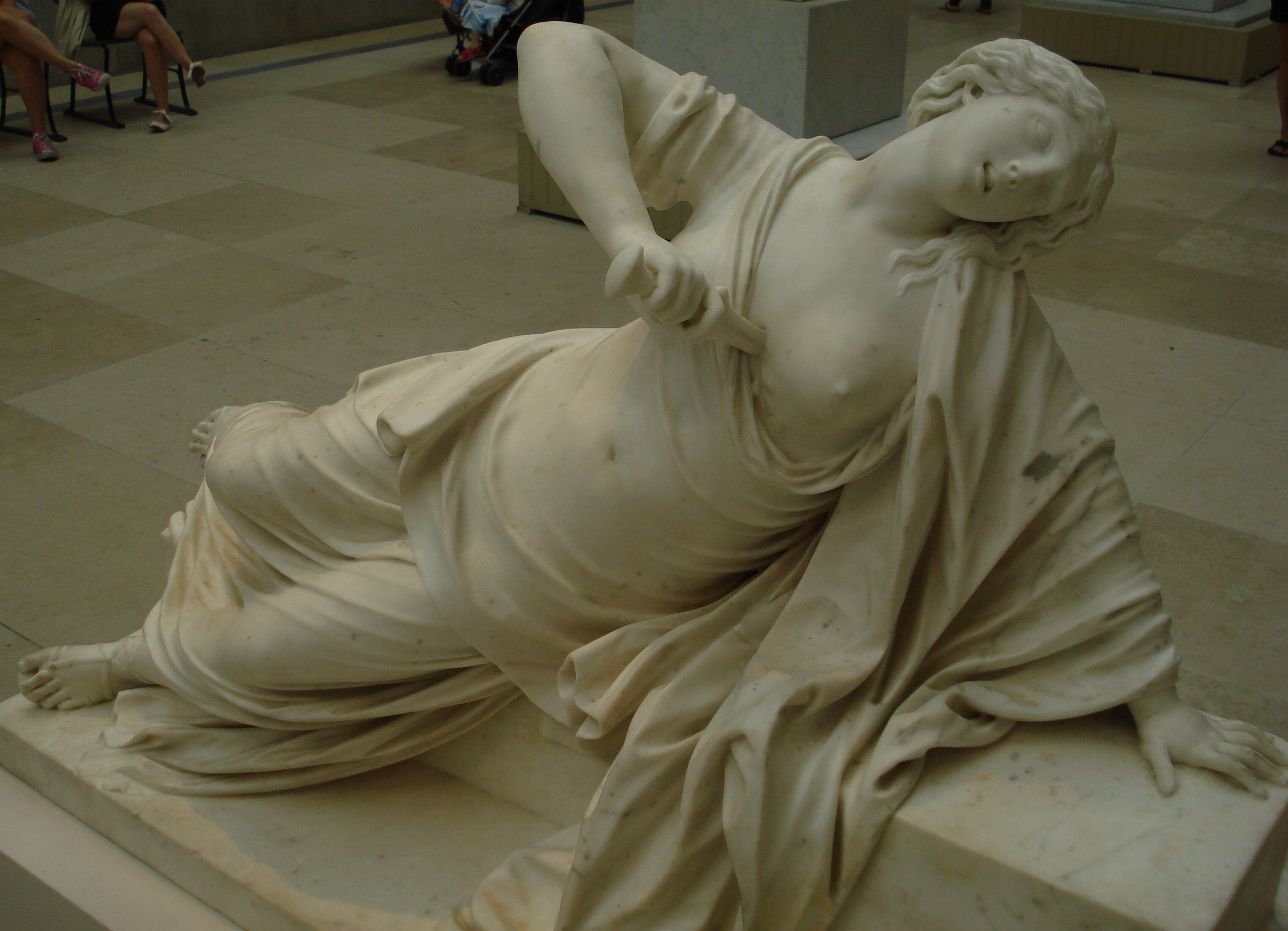
Bertrand's under-lifesize marble statue of the suicide of Lucretia was shown at the Paris Salon of 1704. (Metropolitan Museum of Art)

Philippe Bertrand (1663–1724) was a French sculptor of the late 17th and early 18th century. He received commissions for sculptures for both the Château de Marly and Versailles. In November, 1701, he was made a full member of the Académie de peinture et de sculpture upon the display of a royal commission of 1700, his small bronze of the Rape of Helen, a svelte composition of three figures with a debt to Giambologna's Rape of a Sabine Woman. He was known for sculpting flowing, graceful, and even flying figures, particularly in his bronzes.

In 1714, when the choir of Notre-Dame was refurbished in academic Baroque manner, in Louis XIV's fulfillment of a vow made by Louis XIII, Bertrand was commissioned to provide a small allegorical bronze as the prize for a poetry competition on the occasion, organised by the Académie française to celebrate the completion of the project; it is conserved in the Wallace Collection, London.

Two further small collectors' bronzes by Bertrand are in the Royal Collection, Psyche and Mercury and Prometheus Bound; they are characteristic purchases of George IV.
