= José Romeo =

Spanish painter

José Romeo (1701–1772) was a Spanish painter of the Baroque period.

== Biography ==
He was born in Cervera de la Cañada in Aragón. He painted some dark paintings recalling Salvator Rosa. He studied in Zaragoza and was given a scholarship to study in Rome under Agostino Massuci. He returned to Barcelona, then moved to Madrid to become chamber painter for the king Felipe V. He was employed in restoring canvases for the palacio del Buen Retiro (Casón del buen Retiro). During the reign of Fernando VI he helped Santiago Amigoni paint a Hall of Conversation. He is also called Josef or José Romero.
