= Buildings and architecture of Bath =

Aspect of the city in Somerset, England

City of Bath
UNESCO World Heritage Site
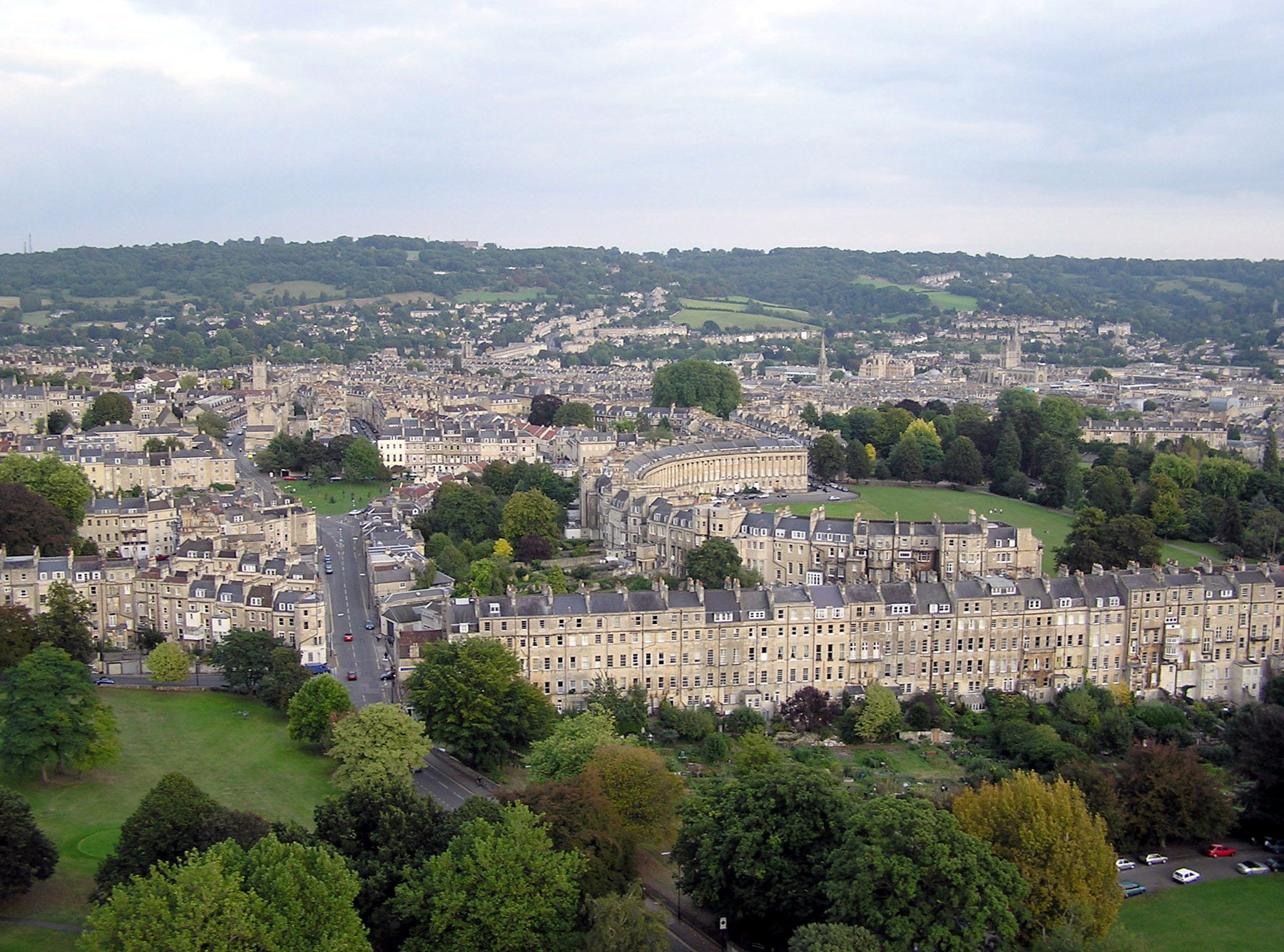
- Aerial view over northern Bath from a hot air balloon. The famous Royal Crescent is in the centre.

- Location within Somerset Location within the United Kingdom
- Location: Bath, Somerset, United Kingdom
- Criteria: Cultural: (i), (ii), (iv)
- Reference: 428
- Inscription: 1987 (11th Session)
- Area: 2,900 ha (7,200 acres)
- Coordinates: 51°22′53″N 2°21′31″W

UNESCO World Heritage Site
- Part of: Great Spas of Europe
- Criteria: Cultural: (ii), (iii)
- Reference: 1613
- Inscription: 2021 (44th Session)

The buildings and architecture of Bath, a city in Somerset in the south west of England, reveal significant examples of the architecture of England, from the Roman Baths (including their significant Celtic presence), to the present day. The city became a World Heritage Site in 1987, largely because of its architectural history and the way in which the city landscape draws together public and private buildings and spaces. The many examples of Palladian architecture are purposefully integrated with the urban spaces to provide "picturesque aestheticism". In 2021, the city was added to a second World Heritage Site, a group of historic spa towns across Europe known as the "Great Spas of Europe". Bath is the only entire city in Britain to achieve World Heritage status, and is a popular tourist destination.

Important buildings include the Roman Baths; neoclassical architect Robert Adam's Pulteney Bridge, based on an unused design for the Rialto Bridge in Venice; and Bath Abbey in the city centre, founded in 1499 on the site of an 8th-century church. Of equal importance are the residential buildings designed and built into boulevards and crescents by the Georgian architects John Wood, the Elder and his son John Wood, the Younger – well-known examples being the Royal Crescent, built around 1770, and The Circus, built around 1760, where each of the three curved segments faces one of the entrances, ensuring that there is always a classical facade facing the entering visitor.

Most of Bath's buildings are made from the local, golden-coloured, Bath Stone. The dominant architectural style is Georgian, which evolved from the Palladian revival style that became popular in the early 18th century. The city became a fashionable and popular spa and social centre during the 18th century. Based initially around its hot springs, this led to a demand for substantial homes and guest houses. The key architects, John Wood and his son, laid out many of the city's present-day squares and crescents within a green valley and the surrounding hills. According to UNESCO this provided... "an integration of architecture, urban design, and landscape setting, and the deliberate creation of a beautiful city". Development during modern eras, including the development of the transport infrastructure and rebuilding after bomb damage during World War II, has mostly been in keeping with earlier styles to maintain the integrated cityscape.

== Celtic, Roman and Saxon ==
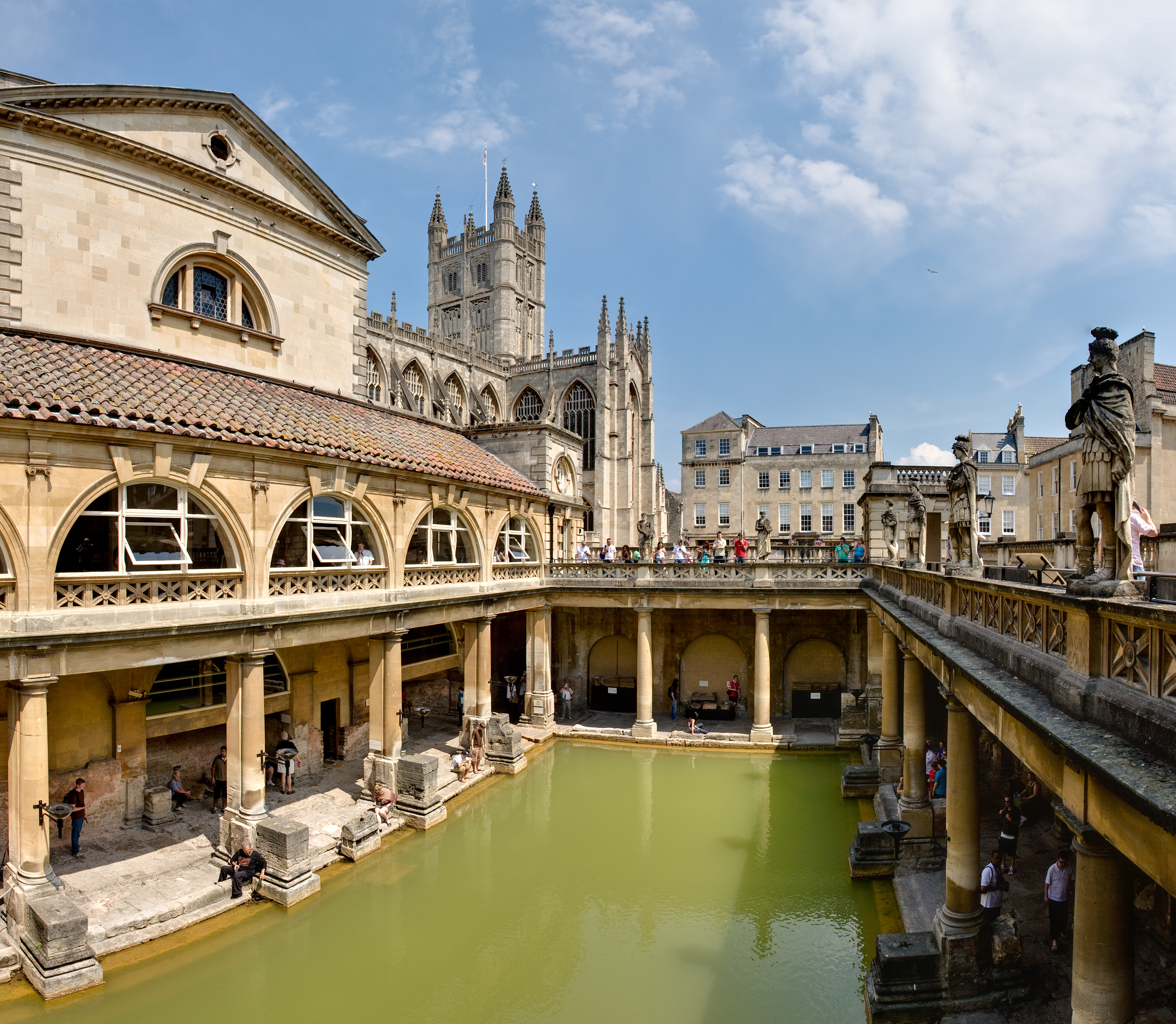
The Great Bath at the Roman Baths. The entire structure above the level of the pillar bases is a later construction.

Buildings from Bath's pre-Norman period either no longer exist, or their remains are below street level. Archaeological sites in the central area of the city have supplied some details about how they may have looked, while the lower areas of the Roman Baths reveal significant remains from the Roman period.

The Baths were built around hot springs, the only ones naturally occurring in the United Kingdom. Archaeological evidence suggests that the main spring in its natural state was treated as a shrine by the Celts. During the early Roman occupation of Britain, in the 60s or 70s AD, engineers drove oak piles into the mud to provide a stable foundation and surrounded the spring with an irregular stone chamber lined with lead. These still survive. At this early stage the spring was an open pool in the corner of the temple precinct. It fed a bathing complex on its south side within a barrel-vaulted building. The complex was gradually built up over the next 300 years. All the stonework above the level of the baths is from more recent periods including the 12th century, when John of Tours built a curative bath over the King's Spring reservoir, and the 16th century, when the city corporation built a new bath (Queen's Bath) to the south of the spring. The spring is now housed in 18th-century buildings designed by architects John Wood, the Elder and John Wood, the Younger; visitor access is via an 1897 concert hall by J M Brydon, which is an eastward continuation of the Grand Pump Room with a glass-domed centre and single-storey radiused corner.

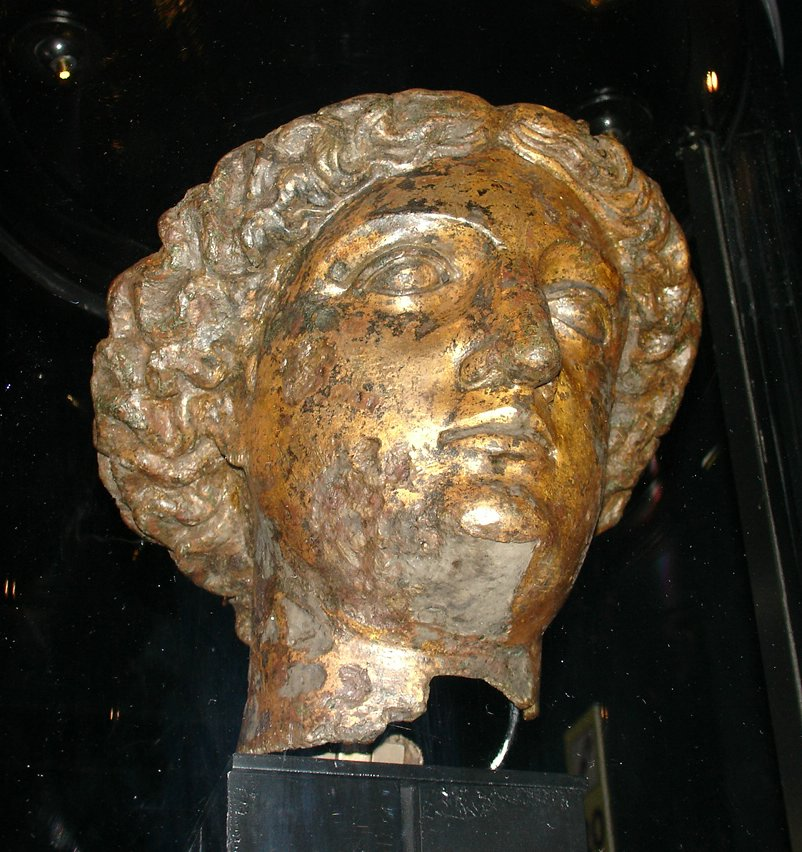
A head of "Sulis-Minerva" found in the ruins of the Roman baths

Beside the baths, a temple, in classical style with four large, fluted Corinthian columns and dedicated to Minerva The temple remained in use for worship until around the 4th century, but the site is now occupied by the Grand Pump Room.

The city was given defensive walls, probably in the 3rd century, but they disappeared during subsequent redevelopments. The line of then formed the basis of the medieval walls enclosing 23 acres (9.3 ha), some which survived until the 18th century. The Anglo-Saxons called the town Baðum, Baðan or Baðon, meaning "at the baths," the source of the present name. In 675, Osric, King of the Hwicce, set up a monastic house at Bath, probably using the walled area as its precinct. The Anglo-Saxon poem known as The Ruin may describe the appearance of the Roman site about this time. King Offa of Mercia gained control of this monastery in 781 and rebuilt the church, which was dedicated to St. Peter. By the 9th century the old Roman street pattern had been lost, and Bath had become a royal possession; King Alfred laid out the town afresh, leaving its south-eastern quadrant as the abbey precinct.

== Norman, Medieval, Tudor, and Stuart ==
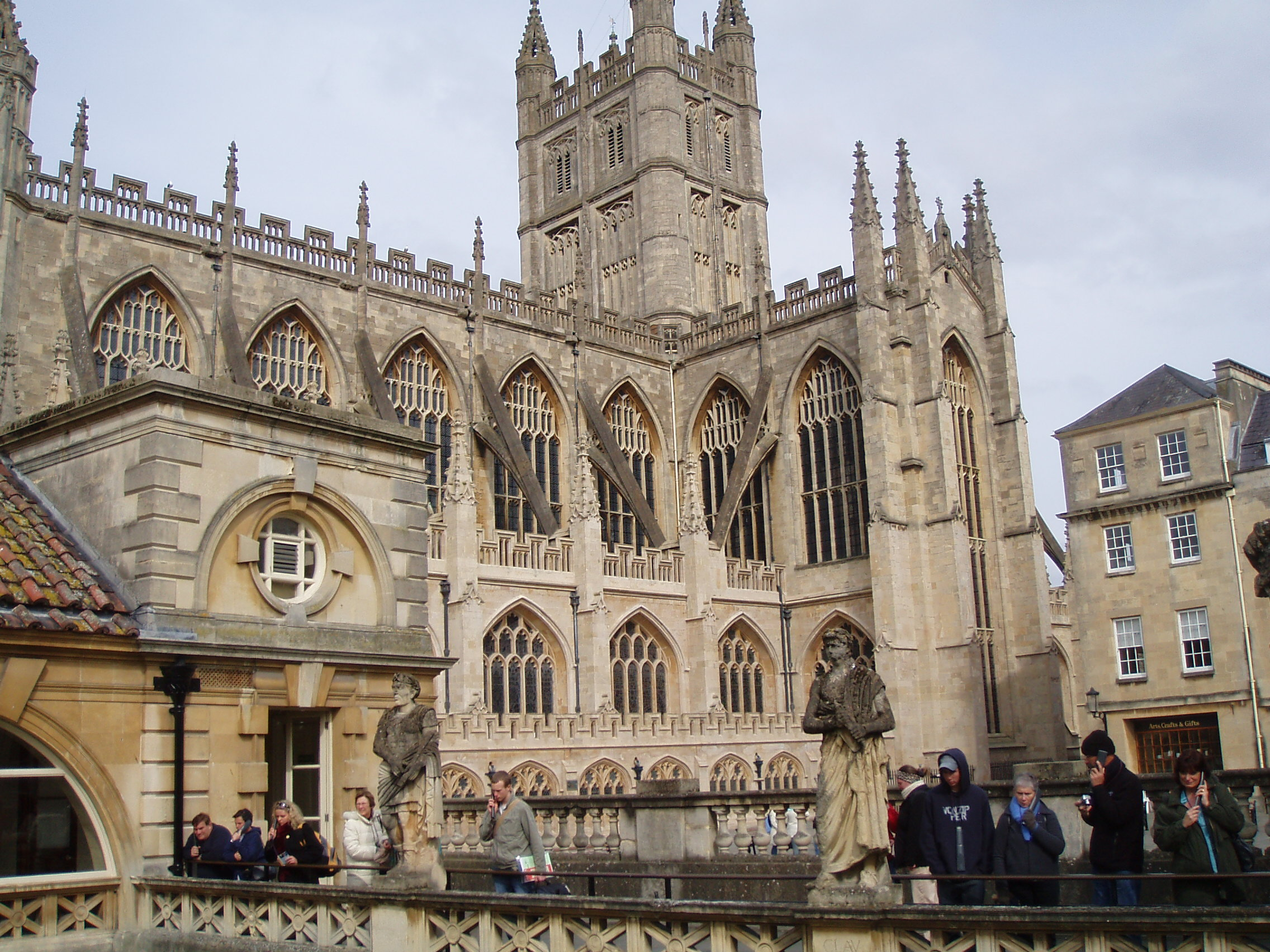
Bath Abbey from the Roman Baths Gallery

Bath Abbey was founded in 1499 on the site of an 8th-century church. The original Anglo-Saxon church was pulled down after 1066, and a grand cathedral dedicated to Saint Peter and Saint Paul was begun on the site by John of Tours, Bishop of Bath and Wells, around 1090; however, only the ambulatory was complete when he died in December 1122. The half-finished cathedral was devastated by fire in 1137, but work continued until about 1156; the completed building was approximately 330 feet (101 m) long. By the 15th century, Bath's abbey church was badly dilapidated and in need of repairs. Oliver King, Bishop of Bath and Wells, decided in 1500 to rebuild it on a smaller scale. It is in a late Perpendicular style with flying buttresses and crocketed pinnacles decorating a crenellated and pierced parapet. The new church was completed just a few years before Bath Priory was dissolved in 1539 by Henry VIII. James Montague, Bishop of Bath and Wells from 1608, spent considerable sums in restoring Bath Abbey, which was re-roofed at his own expense. Major restoration work was carried out by Sir George Gilbert Scott in the 1860s, funded by the rector, Charles Kemble. The choir and transepts have a fan vault by Robert and William Vertue, in the 1860s, completing the original roof from 1608. The nave was given a matching vault in the 19th century. The building is lit by 52 windows.

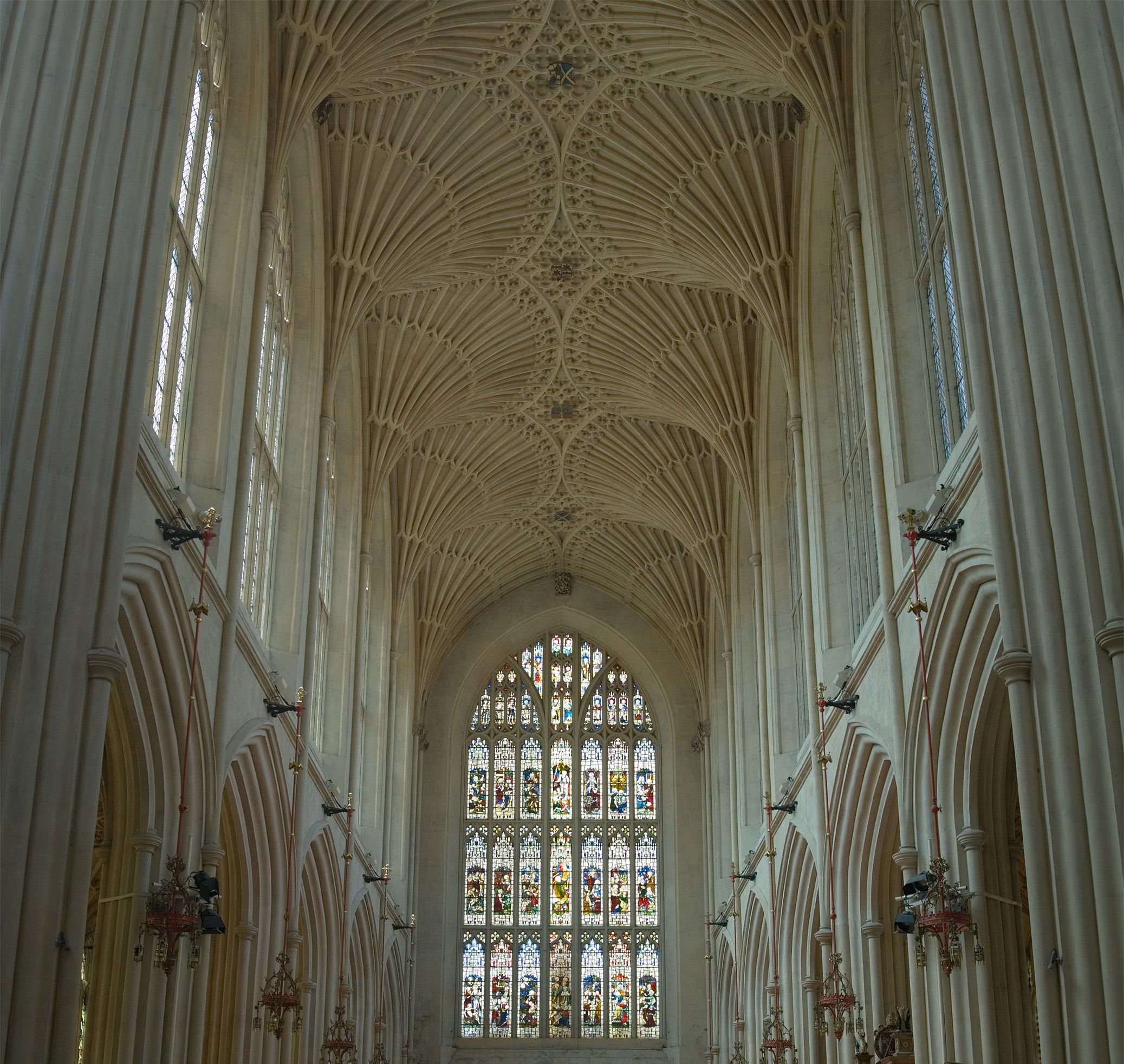
Fan vaulting over the nave at Bath Abbey. A Victorian restoration of the original roof from 1608

The medieval era is represented by the remains of the city walls in Upper Borough Walls. There are no other surviving buildings from this period. Several areas of the city underwent development during the Stuart period, in response to the increasing number of visitors to the spa and resort town who required accommodation. The St Thomas à Becket Church was built between 1490 and 1498 by John Cantlow, Prior of Bath Abbey and took the place of an older Norman church. The church was commonly called Old Widcombe Church and used to be the principal church of the parishes of Widcombe and Lyncombe. The Domesday survey of 1086 shows a small settlement around the church although no trace of it remains. In 1847 a much larger church, St Matthews, was built in Widcombe parish. On 22 April 1847, it was announced that the church bells, which had for centuries been in the tower of St. Thomas à Becket, were to be removed and installed in the new St. Matthew's. Widcombe Manor was originally built in 1656 and then rebuilt in 1727 for Philip Bennet the local MP. Thomas Guidott, moved to Bath and set up practice in 1668. He became interested in the curative properties of the waters and he wrote A discourse of Bathe, and the hot waters there. Also, Some Enquiries into the Nature of the water in 1676. This brought the health-giving properties of the hot mineral waters to the attention of the country and soon the aristocracy started to arrive to partake in them.

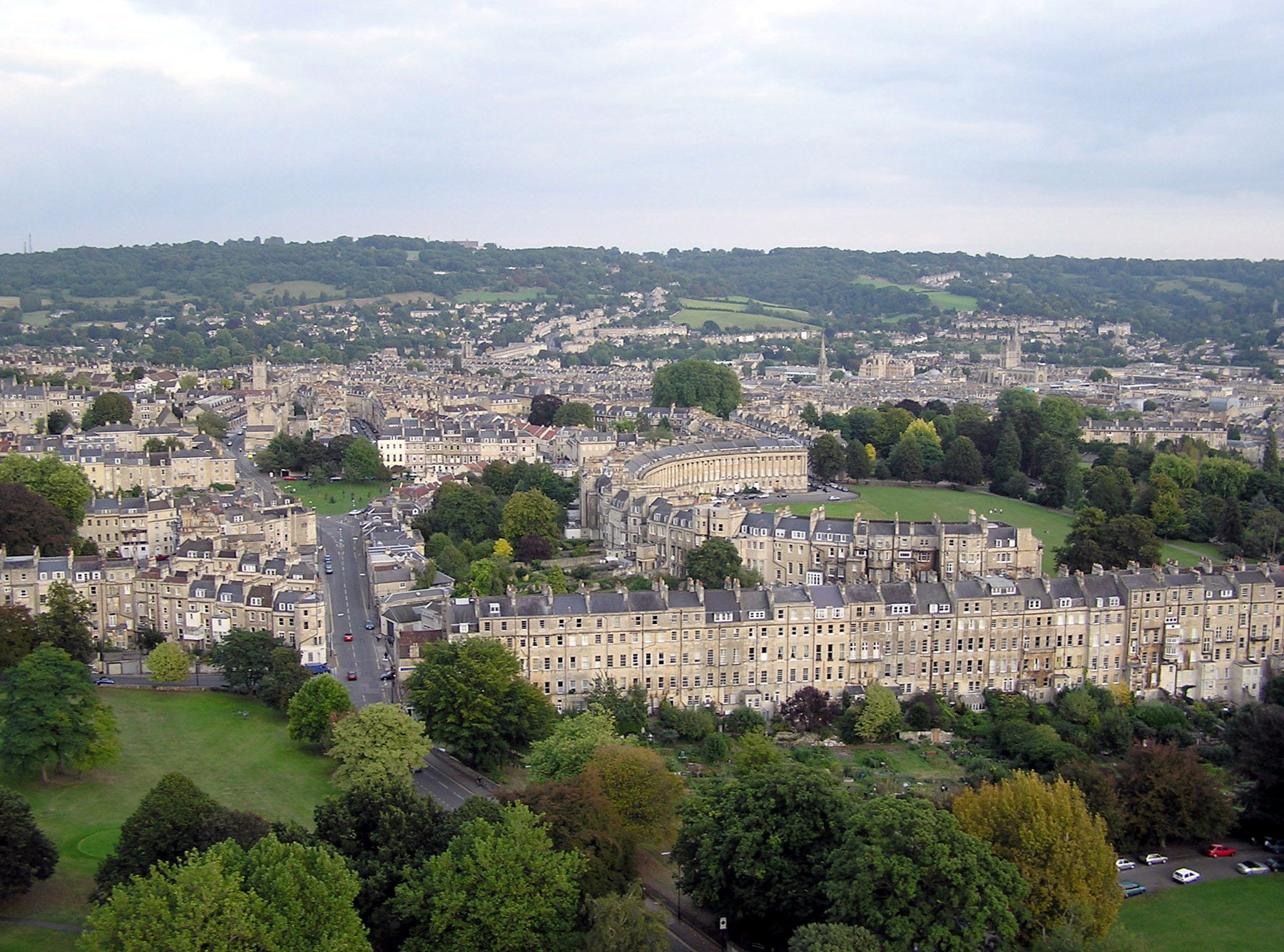
Aerial view over northern Bath. The Royal Crescent is in the centre.

The early 18th century the central area around the Abbey was expanded including the Abbey Church Yard which contained Marshal Wade's House, and Trim Street, which was named after George Trim who owned the land. Number 5, which is also known as General Wolfe's house, is a 2-storey building with a parapet and rusticated quoins, built by Thomas Greenway. The doorway has Ionic pilasters and a tympanum decorated with the implements of war. In 1716 the architect William Killigrew was commissioned to rebuild St John's Hospital which was founded around 1180, by Bishop Reginald Fitz Jocelin and is among the oldest almshouses in England. The 2 storey Bath stone building has a heavy ground floor arcade of round-headed arches on pillars, and retains its original window mouldings and sashes. Building work continued after 1727 under the 23-year-old John Wood, the Elder, his first commission in Bath.

== Georgian ==
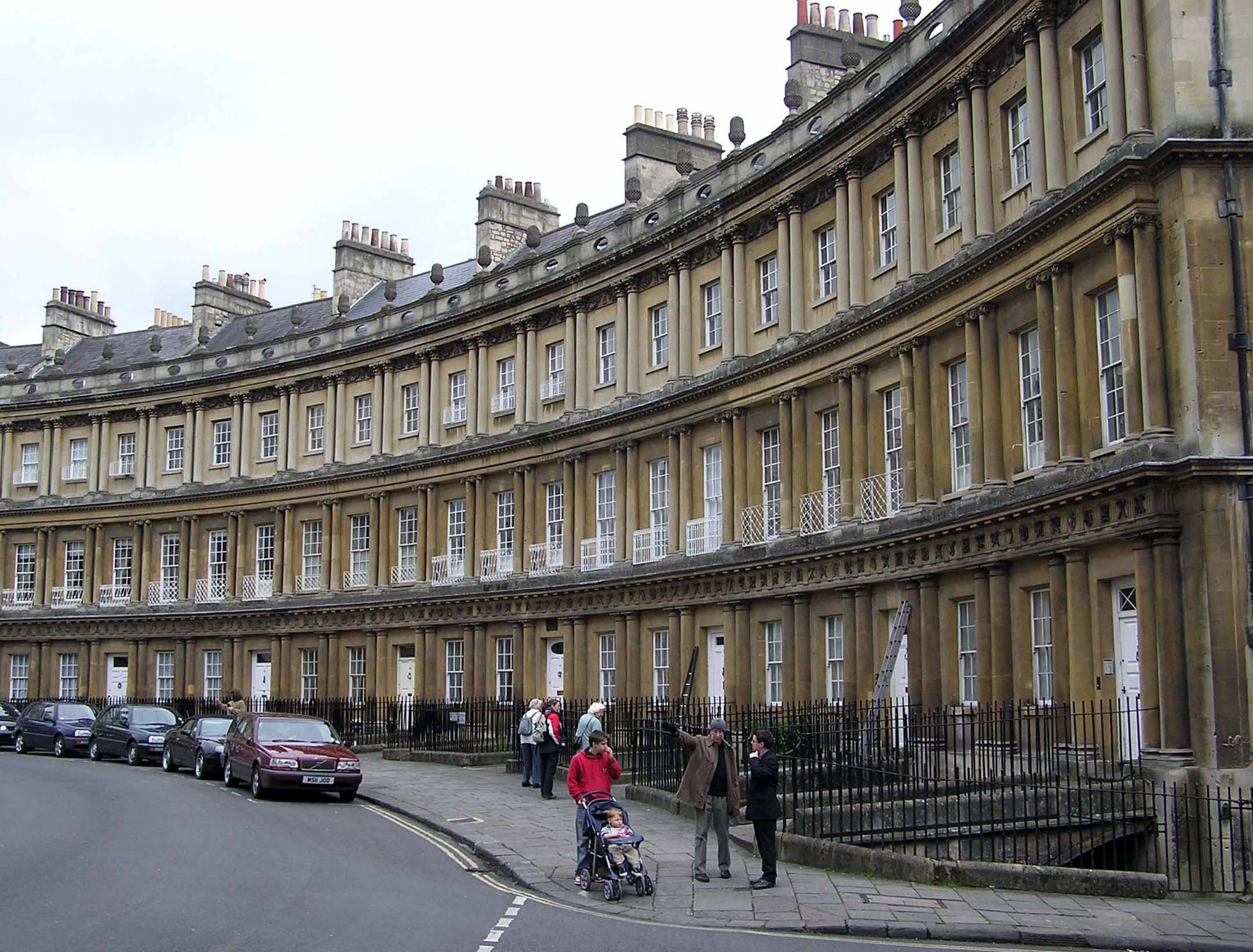
The Circus consists of three long, curved terraces designed by the elder John Wood.

The dominant style of architecture in central Bath is Georgian; this evolved from the Palladian revival style which became popular in the early 18th century.

The original purpose of much of Bath's architecture is concealed by the honey-coloured classical façades; in an era before the advent of the luxury hotel, these apparently elegant residences were frequently purpose-built lodging houses, where visitors could hire a room, a floor, or (according to their means) an entire house for the duration of their visit, and be waited on by the house's communal servants.

The architects John Wood, the Elder and his son John Wood, the Younger laid out the new quarters in streets and squares, the identical façades of which gave an impression of palatial scale and classical decorum. Much of the creamy gold Bath stone which was used for construction throughout the city, was obtained from the limestone Combe Down and Bathampton Down Mines, which were owned by Ralph Allen (1694–1764). Allen, in order to advertise the quality of his quarried limestone, commissioned the elder John Wood to build him a country house on his Prior Park estate between the city and the mines, replacing his Town House. Queen Square was the first speculative development by John Wood, the Elder who lived in one of the houses. Queen Square was described by Nikolaus Pevsner as "one of the finest Palladian compositions in England before 1730".

The west side (numbers 14–18 and 18A, 19 and 20) was designed by John Pinch the younger in 1830 and differs from Wood's original design as the central block is in Neo-Grecian style. The Bath Royal Literary and Scientific Institution (BRLSI) now occupies 16–18. The south side (numbers 5–13) was originally left open, but is now occupied by a hotel. The obelisk in the centre of the square was erected by Beau Nash in 1738.

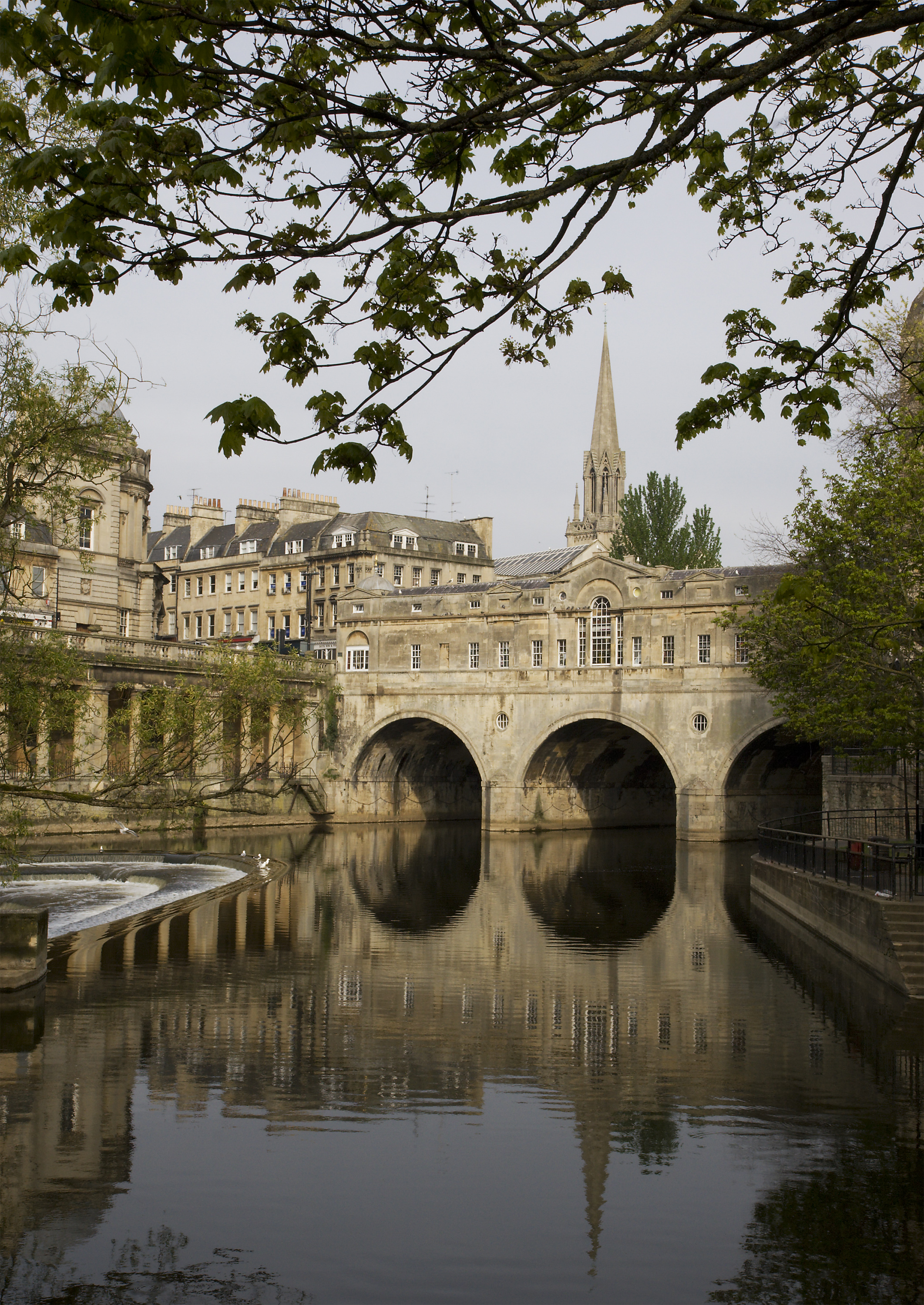
The neoclassical architect Robert Adam designed Pulteney Bridge, based on an unused design for the Rialto Bridge in Venice.

The Circus is seen as the pinnacle of Wood's work. It consists of three long, curved terraces designed by the elder John Wood to form a circular space or theatre intended for civic functions and games. The games give a clue to the design, the inspiration behind which was the Colosseum in Rome.

Like the Colosseum, the three façades have a different order of architecture on each floor: Doric on the ground level, then Ionic on the piano nobile and finishing with Corinthian on the upper floor, the style of the building thus becoming progressively more ornate as it rises.

Gay Street links Queen Square to The Circus. It was designed by John Wood, the Elder in 1735 and completed by his son John Wood, the Younger. The houses are of 3 storeys with Mansard roofs, with many also having Ionic columns. Hester Thrale, who was also known as Mrs Piozzi, lived at number 8, with its 4 Corinthian pilasters on the ground and 1st floors in 1781.

Number 41 is on the corner between Gay Street and Queen Square. It was the home of John Wood, the Younger.

One of the main shopping streets is now Milsom Street, which was built in 1762 by Thomas Lightholder. The buildings were originally grand town houses with mansard roofs and Corinthian columns.

The bank at number 24 was built by Wilson and Willcox and includes baroque detail not seen on the other buildings. Numbers 37 to 42 which are known as Somersetshire Buildings have been designated as Grade I listed buildings.

The Octagon Chapel was a place of worship when it was built in 1767, then a furniture shop by Mallett Antiques, and is now a restaurant.

Milsom Street leads uphill, from the Royal National Hospital for Rheumatic Diseases, which was founded in 1738 as The Mineral Water Hospital, to The Paragon which overlooks the Walcot area. The Paragon was designed by Thomas Warr Attwood. Each building has matching doors and windows with central pediments and flat entablatures either side of the 1st floor windows and Tuscan pilasters and pediments to the doorways. Numbers 22 to 37 continue the theme from numbers 1 to 21 and were completed in 1775 by Joseph Axford, a local mason. Numbers 28 to 32 were damaged by bombing during World War II but have since been restored.

St Swithin's Church was built between 1779 and 1790 by John Palmer. The church house which forms number 38 The Paragon was built in the early 18th century. The adjoining cemetery has gates with a rusticated base and panels with inverted torches between pilasters. There is an entablature with metopes and triglyphs.

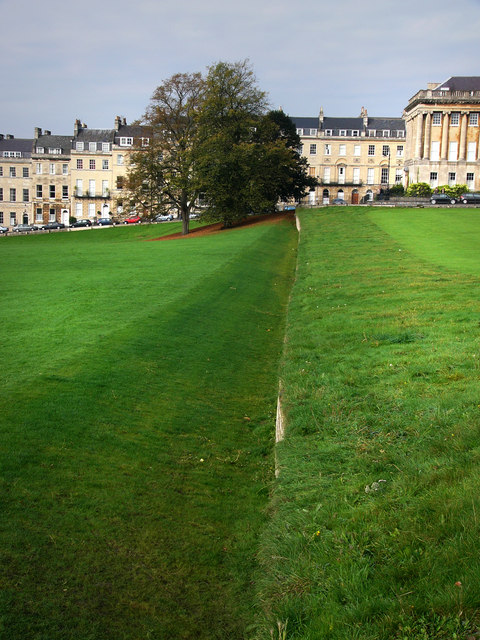
The ha-ha in front of the Royal Crescent gives an uninterrupted view of the crescent from Royal Victoria Park.

The best known of Bath's terraces is the Royal Crescent, built between 1767 and 1774 and designed by the younger John Wood. But all is not what it seems; while Wood designed the great curved façade of what appears to be about 30 houses with Ionic columns on a rusticated ground floor, that was the extent of his input. Each purchaser bought a certain length of the façade, and then employed their own architect to build a house to their own specifications behind it; hence what appears to be two houses is sometimes one. This system of town planning is betrayed at the rear of the crescent: while the front is completely uniform and symmetrical, the rear is a mixture of differing roof heights, juxtapositions and fenestration. This "Queen Anne fronts and Mary-Anne backs" architecture occurs repeatedly in Bath.

In front of the Royal Crescent is a Hh-ha, a trench on which the inner side of which is vertical and faced with stone, with the outer face sloped and turfed, making the trench, in effect, a sunken fence or retaining wall. The ha-ha is designed not to interrupt the view from Royal Victoria Park, and to be invisible until seen from close by.

The other crescents which give Bath its architectural identity include: Camden Crescent which was built by John Eveleigh in 1788, and damaged by a landslide in 1889, Lansdown Crescent, designed by John Palmer and constructed by a variety of builders between 1789 and 1793, and Somerset Place for which the facades were designed by the architect John Eveleigh who went bankrupt during the building, which started in 1790 but was not completed until the 1820s. Some of Somerset Crescent was destroyed during the Second World War and rebuilt as student accommodation in the 1950s and 1960s. It used to form part of the campus of Bath Spa University, but has since been sold.

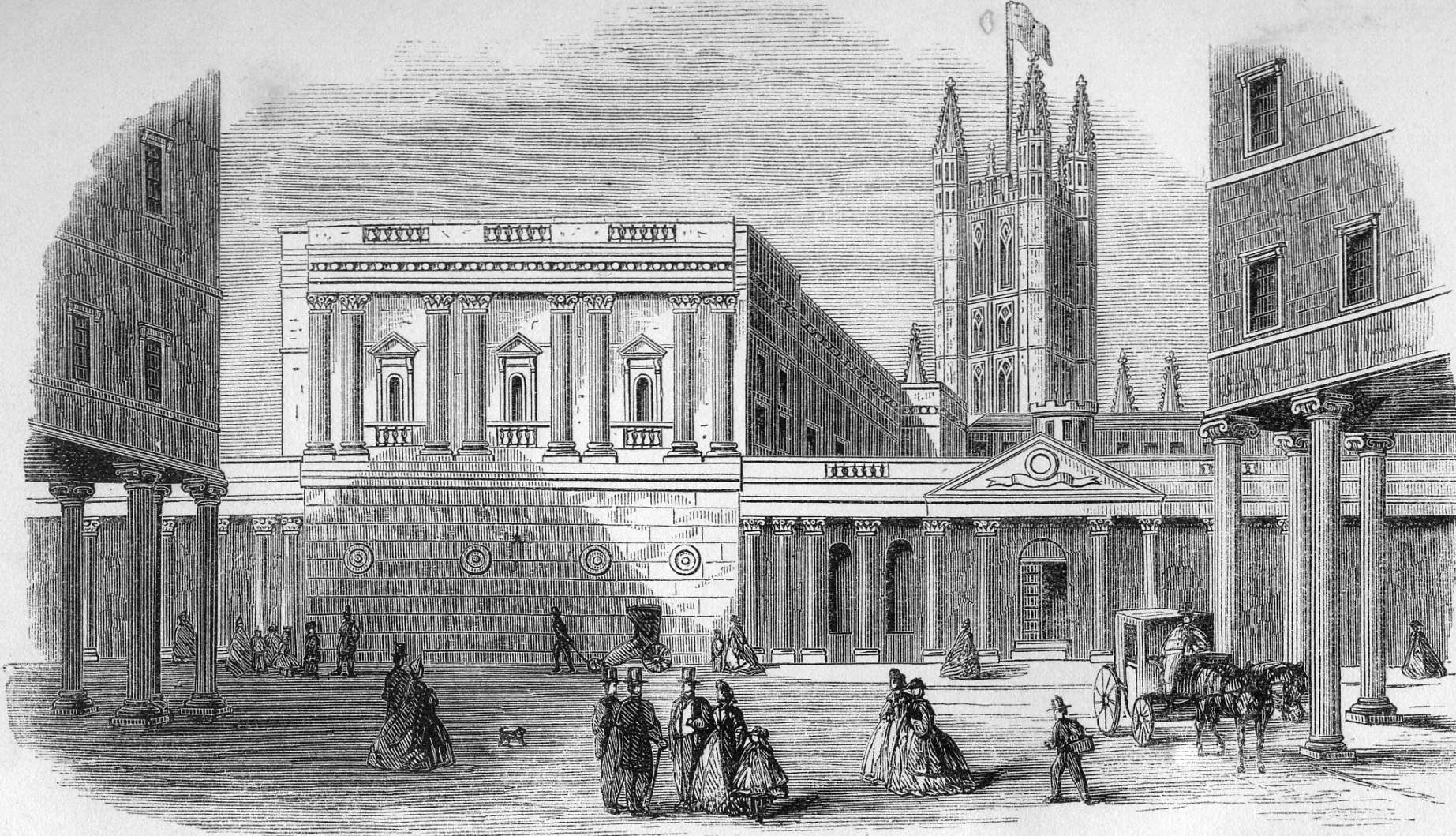
Engraving of The Pump Room and Baths from a book published in 1864

The area of North Parade, South Parade, Pierrepont and Duke Streets was part of a wider scheme to build a Royal Forum, similar to Queen Square, which was never completed. Wood designed the facade, of Bath stone, after which a variety of builders completed the work with different interiors and rear elevations. Many of the buildings are now hotels and shops whilst some remain as private residences.

North Parade Bridge was built almost 100 years later in 1836 by William Tierney Clark. His original bridge was made of cast iron on stone abutments, with lodges and staircases. This was rebuilt in 1936 completely in stone. Many of the buildings in South Parade are now hotels and restaurants whilst some remain as private residences. The area which Wood envisaged as an area of sunken gardens matching the houses is now a car park.

On the southern side of the road is the Roman Catholic St John's Church, which was designed and built between 1861 and 1863 by Charles Francis Hansom who added the 222-foot (68 m) spire in 1867.

The heart of the Georgian city were Wood's Assembly Rooms, and the Pump Room, which, together with its associated Lower Assembly Rooms, was designed by Thomas Baldwin, a local builder responsible for many other buildings in the city, including the terraces in Argyle Street, the Guildhall, The Cross Bath, Widcombe Crescent and Royal Baths Treatment Centre in Bath Street.

The Grand Pump Room itself includes a North Colonnade of 9 bays, with unfluted Ionic columns. The South Colonnade is similar but had an upper floor added in the late 19th century.

The colonnades and side wall of the Pump Room have a facade on Stall Street. Baldwin rose rapidly, becoming a leader in Bath's architectural history. Great Pulteney Street, where Baldwin eventually lived, is another of his works: this wide boulevard, constructed c. 1789 and over 1,000 feet (305 m) long and 100 feet (30 m) wide, leading from Laura Place is lined on both sides by Georgian terraces.

Around 1770 the neoclassical architect Robert Adam designed Pulteney Bridge, a three-arched bridge spanning the Avon. He used as his prototype an original, but unused, design by Andrea Palladio for the Rialto Bridge in Venice. Thus, Pulteney Bridge became not just a means of crossing the river, but also a shopping arcade. Along with the Rialto Bridge, is one of the very few surviving bridges in Europe to serve this dual purpose. It has been substantially altered since it was built. The bridge was named after Frances and William Pulteney, the owners of the Bathwick estate for which the bridge provided a link to the rest of Bath.

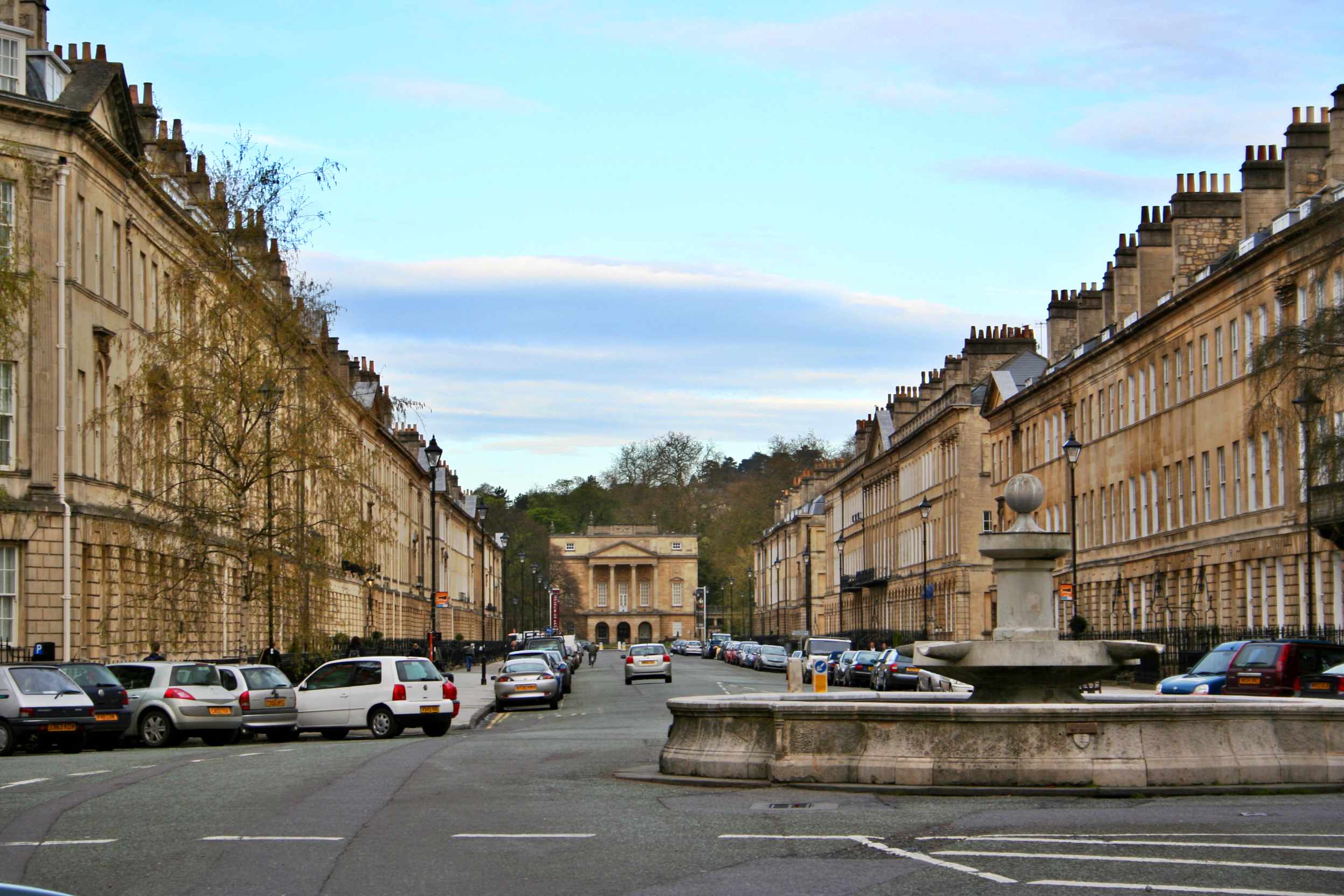
A view down Great Pulteney Street, which was commissioned by Sir William Pulteney, towards the Holburne Museum of Art.

At the end of Great Pulteney Street is the Holburne Museum of Art, which was originally designed as the Sydney Hotel and was built by Charles Harcourt Masters in 1795–6. It stands on Sydney Place and within the Sydney Pleasure Gardens which stretch from the road to the Kennet and Avon Canal. Next to the church of St Mary the Virgin is Bathwick Hill which leads up to Claverton Down and the campus of the University of Bath; beyond is Claverton Manor, which was built in 1820 and is now home to the American Museum.

The early 18th century saw Bath acquire its first purpose-built theatre, the Theatre Royal, along with the Grand Pump Room attached to the Roman Baths and assembly rooms. Master of Ceremonies Beau Nash, who presided over the city's social life from 1705 until his death in 1761, drew up a code of behaviour for public entertainments. The population of the city had reached 40,020 by the time of the 1801 census, making it one of the largest cities in Britain, which was expanding up the surrounding hills.

William Thomas Beckford bought a house in Lansdown Crescent in 1822, eventually buying a further two houses in the crescent to form his residence. Having acquired all the land between his home and the top of Lansdown Hill, north of the city centre, he created a garden over half a mile in length and built Beckford's Tower at the top.

To the west Partis College was built in the Newbridge area as a large block of almshouses between 1825 and 1827. It was founded by Ann and Fletcher Partis for women "who had been left in reduced circumstances", and still provides accommodation, in 30 terraced houses set around three sides of a quadrangle, for women, aged over 50 in membership of the Church of England. In 1862, George Gilbert Scott redesigned the original chapel, which had been built by Goodrich.

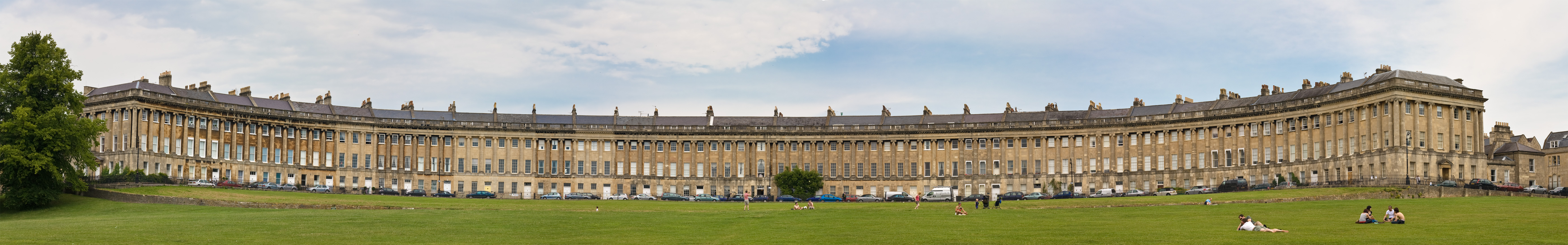
A panoramic view of the Royal Crescent

== Victorian ==
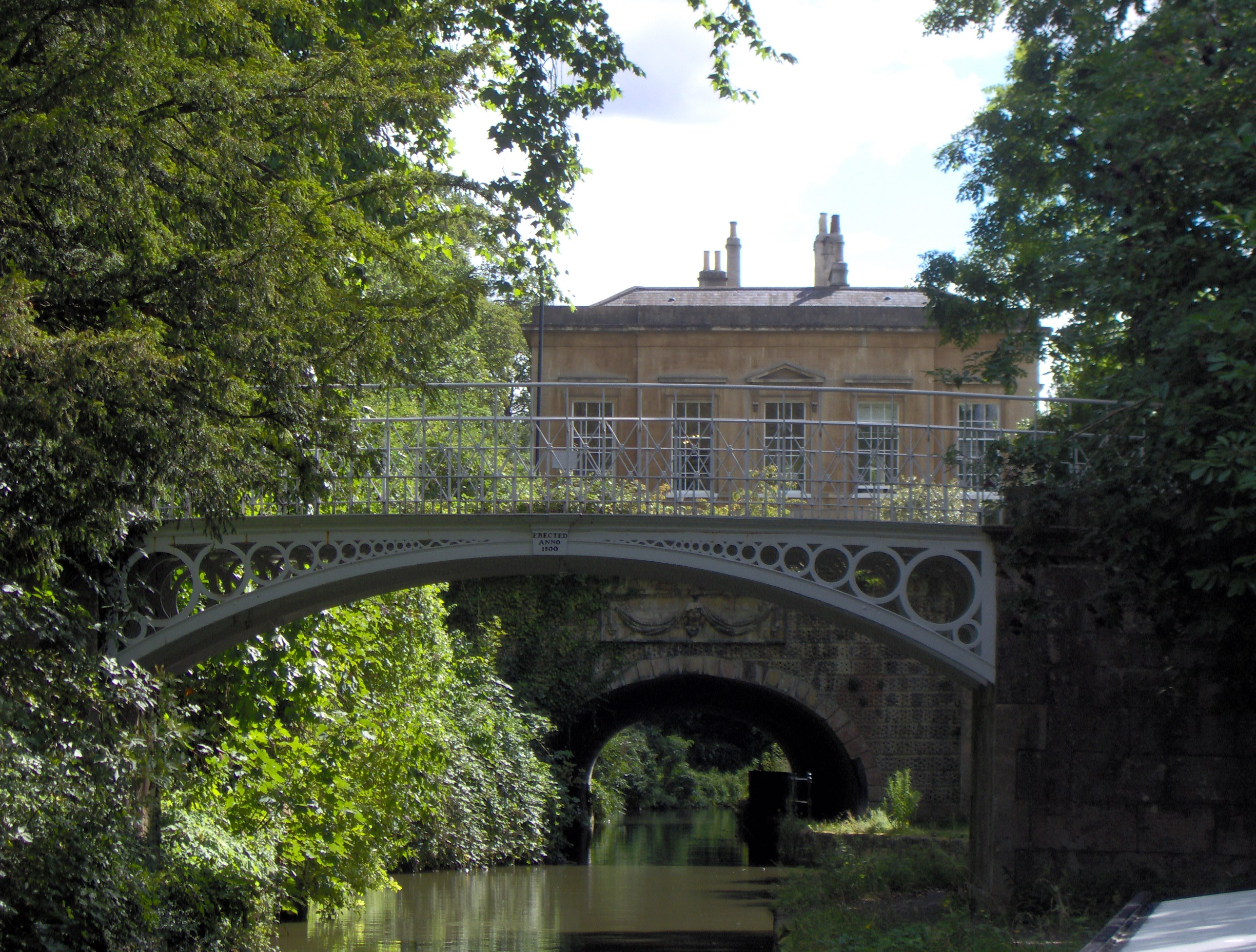
Cleveland House and the cast iron bridges of Sydney Gardens

In 1810 the Kennet and Avon Canal opened linking the River Avon at Bath to Reading. Bath Locks mark the divergence of the River Avon and the canal, 656 yards (600 m) south of Pulteney Bridge. Alongside the bottom lock are a side pound and a pumping station that pumps water up the locks to replace that used each time the lock is opened.

The next stage of Bath Deep Lock is numbered 8/9 as two locks were combined when the canal was restored in 1976. The new chamber has a depth of 19 feet 5 inches (5.92 m), making it Britain's deepest canal lock. Just above the 'deep lock' is an area of water enabling the lock to refill and above this is Wash House Lock, followed by Abbey View Lock, by which there is another pumping station and, in quick succession, Pultney Lock and Bath Top Lock.

Above the top lock the canal passes through Sydney Gardens including two short tunnels and under two cast iron footbridges dating from 1800. Cleveland tunnel is 173 feet (53 m) long and runs under Cleveland House, the former headquarters of the Kennet and Avon Canal Company. A trap-door in the tunnel roof was used to pass paperwork between clerks above and bargees below. Many of the bridges over the canal are also listed buildings.

Victoria Bridge, which was built in 1836 across the River Avon, was an important early example of a cable-stayed bridge.

As the size of the city and numbers of visitors grew new facilities opened. Cleveland Pools in Hampton Row, is a semi-circular lido built, by John Pinch the elder, around 1814. It is believed to be the oldest surviving public outdoor swimming pools in England.

The Corridor is one of the world's earliest retail arcades, designed by architect Henry Goodridge and built in 1825, with a glass roof. The High Street end has a Doric colonnade. Each end has marble columns. A musicians gallery, with a wrought iron balustrade and gilt lions heads and garlands, is in the centre of the arcade. Cleveland Bridge was built in 1826 by William Hazledine with Henry Goodridge as the architect.

St Michael's Church was rebuilt between 1835 and 1837; and St. Stephen's Church built in Walcot by James Wilson, between 1840 and 1845.

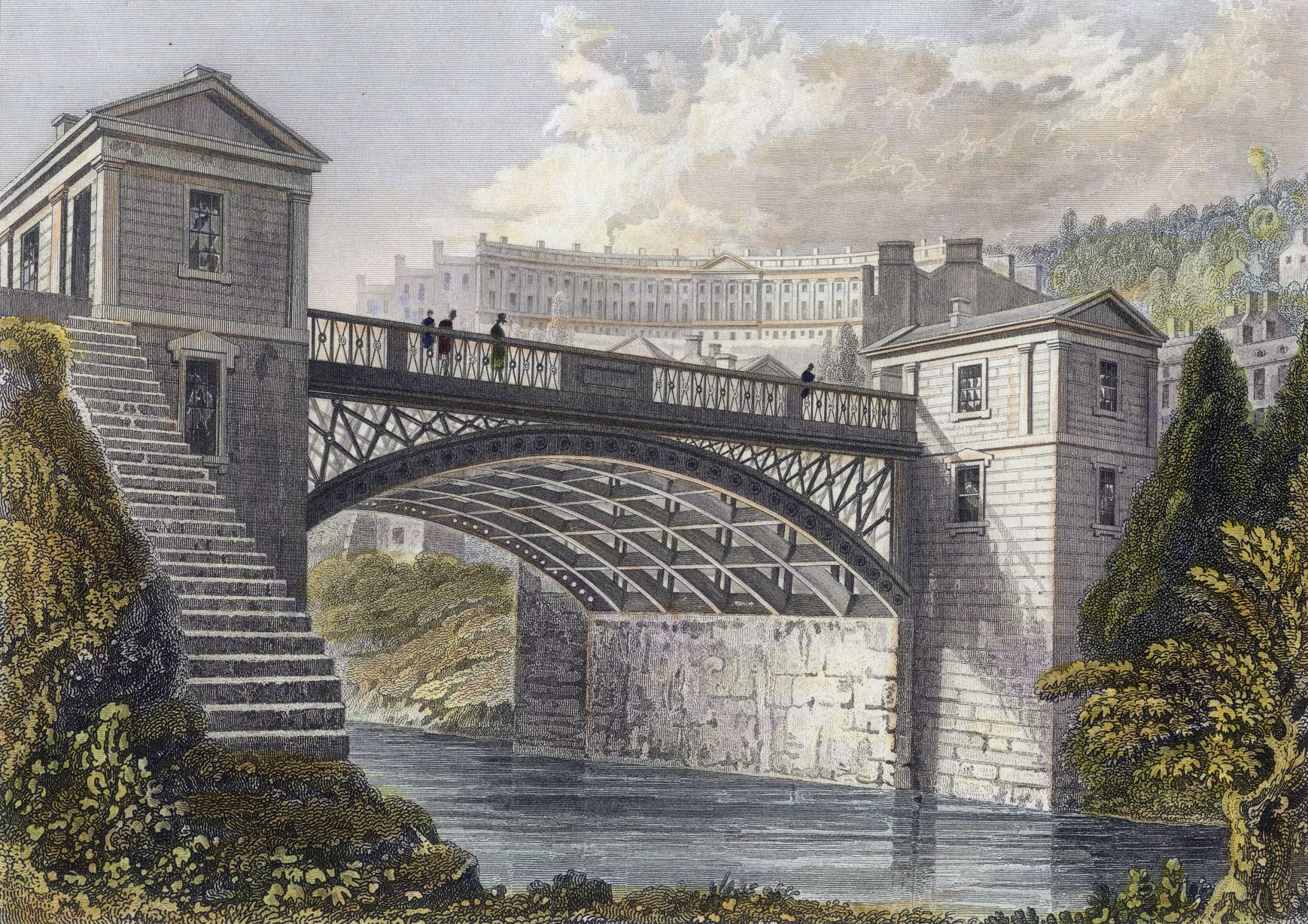
"The New Bridge at Bathwick" (1830 engraving by FP Hay)

The opening of the Great Western Railway in 1841 removed much of the canal's traffic, and in 1852 the railway company took over its running. Bath Spa railway station is the principal railway station in Bath. It was built in 1840 by Brunel. It is in an asymmetrical Tudor style with curving gables, and lies on the north bank of the Avon, with the line swerving elegantly across from the southern bank to the station and then back again.

Green Park railway station opened in 1870 as the terminus of Midland Railway's Mangotsfield and Bath Branch Line. For some of its life, it was known as Bath Queen Square. It includes a vaulted glass roof in a single-span wrought iron arch structure. Parts of the distinctive glass roof were damaged during bombing raids in April 1942, and the glazing was not re-instated during railway usage after the war. Following the Beeching Report, passenger trains ceased from 1966 and the last goods train ran in 1971. In the 1980s the rail approaches to the station were redeveloped as a major supermarket opened in December 1982, and the station itself is used as a pedestrian passageway to and from the city; there are a number of small shop units in the former station buildings.

The Victoria Art Gallery, a free public art museum and library was built between the Guildhall and Pulteney Bridge. It was designed by John McKean Brydon. The exterior of the building includes a statue of Queen Victoria, by A. C. Lucchesi, and friezes of classical figures by George Anderson Lawson.

== Twentieth century ==
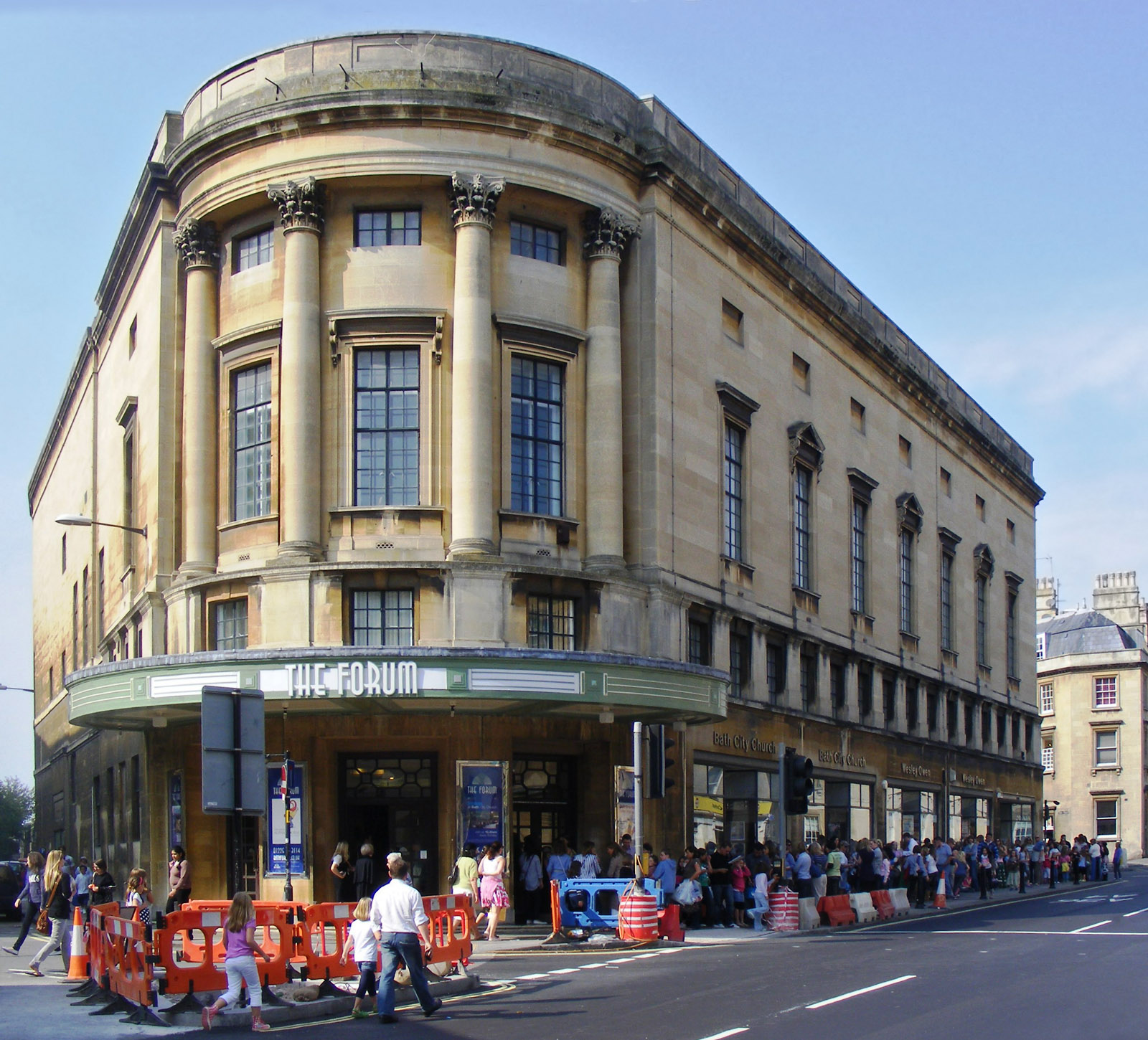
The Forum which opened as a cinema in 1934, and has since been converted into a church and concert venue

The Empire Hotel was built in 1901 on Orange Grove close to both Bath Abbey and Pulteney Bridge.

In the 1920s and 1930s Bath's architectural traditions combined with an art deco style in buildings such as The Forum which opened as a 2,000-seat cinema in 1934, and has since been converted into a church and concert venue. The Royal United Hospital opened in the Weston suburb, about 1.5 miles (2.4 km) from the city centre in 1932.

During World War II, between the evening of 25 April and the early morning of 27 April 1942, Bath suffered three air raids in reprisal for RAF raids on the German cities of Lübeck and Rostock, part of the Luftwaffe campaign popularly known as the Baedeker Blitz. Over 400 people were killed, and more than 19,000 buildings were damaged or destroyed. Houses in the Royal Crescent, Circus and Paragon were burnt out along with the Assembly Rooms, while part of the south side of Queen Square was destroyed.

In the 1970s and 1980s it was recognised that conservation of historic buildings was inadequate, leading to more care and reuse of buildings and open spaces. In 1987 the city was selected as a UNESCO World Heritage Site, recognising its international cultural significance.

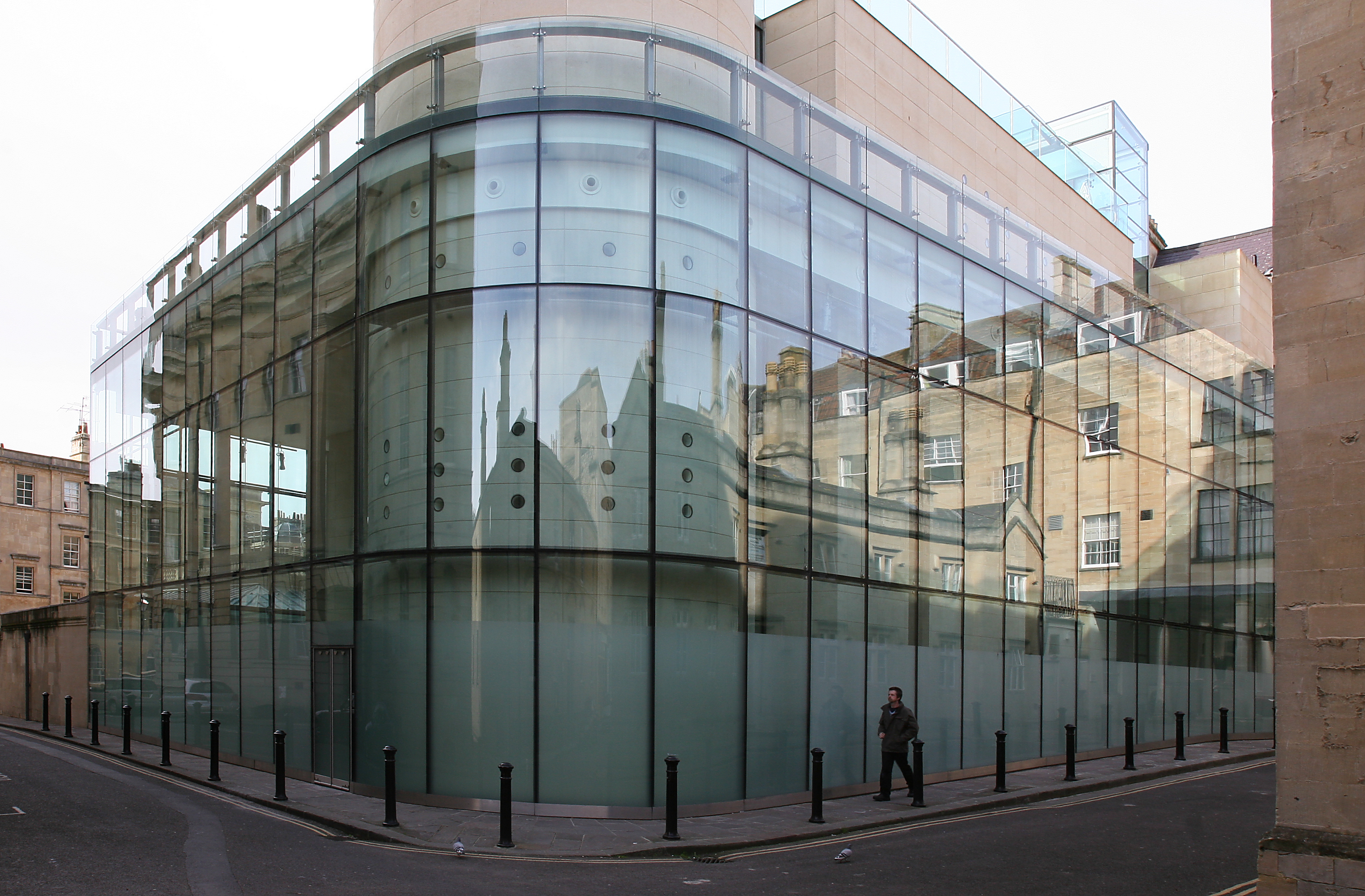
Thermae Bath Spa: the main building by Grimshaw Architects

In the 1960s and early 1970s the way in which some parts of Bath were redeveloped, resulting in the loss of some 18th- and 19th-century buildings, led to a popular campaign to change the way the city was developing, which drew strength from the publication of Adam Fergusson's The Sack of Bath. Since 2000, developments have included the Bath Spa, SouthGate, and the Bath Western Riverside project.

== Twenty-first century ==
Controversy continued with the demolition of the 1930s Churchill House, a mock-Georgian municipal building originally housing the Electricity Board, to make way for the new Bath Bus Station. This was part of the Southgate redevelopment begun in 2007 in which the central 1960s shopping precinct, bus station, and multi-story carpark were demolished and replaced with a new area of mock-Georgian shopping streets. As a result of the changes the city's status as a World Heritage Site was reviewed by UNESCO in 2009. The decision was made to let Bath keep its status, but UNESCO asked to be consulted on future phases of the Riverside development, saying that the density and volume of buildings in the second and third phases of the development needed to be reconsidered. It also said that Bath must do more to attract world-class architecture to any new developments.

In 2021, Bath received its second UNESCO World Heritage inscription, becoming part of a group of 11 spa towns across seven countries that were listed by UNESCO as the "Great Spas of Europe".

== See also ==
- Grade I listed buildings in Bath and North East Somerset
- Grade II* listed buildings in Bath and North East Somerset
- Bath Preservation Trust
