= Bath city walls =

Defensive structure encircling Bath, England

City Walls or Borough Walls
- Bath, Somerset in England
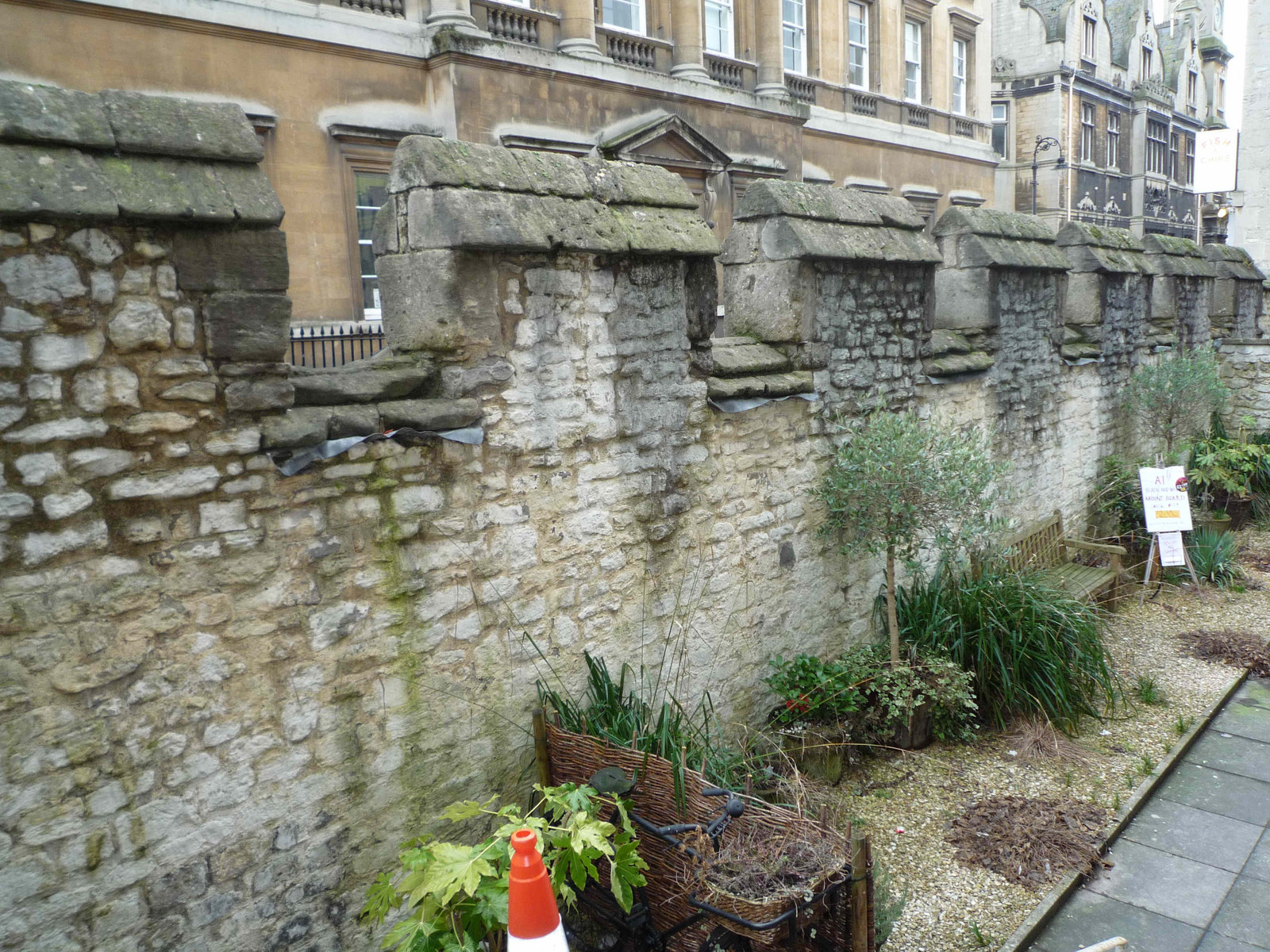
- Remains of Bath's city walls

Site information
- Type: City wall
- Condition: Fragmentary remains

Location
- Shown within Somerset
- Coordinates: 51.3825028°N 2.3614444°W
- Grid reference: grid reference ST751648

Site history
- Built: 3rd century
- Materials: Stone
- Fate: Almost entirely abandoned Partly preserved (at Upper Borough Walls and East gate remains)

Bath's city walls (also referred to as borough walls) were a sequence of defensive structures built around the city of Bath in England. Roman in origin, then restored by the Anglo-Saxons, and later strengthened in the High medieval period, the walls formed a complete circuit. They enclosed the historic core of the modern city, an area of approximately 23 acres (9.3 ha) including the Roman Baths and medieval Bath Abbey. In the mid 18th century, most of the town walls and gatehouses were demolished to accommodate the Georgian development of the town. However, the line of the walls can still be traced in the town's street layout.

== History ==
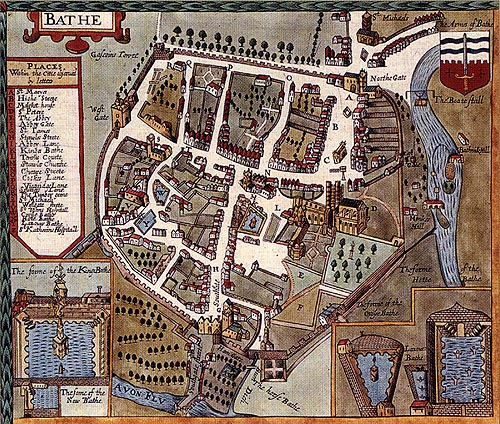
Bath's medieval walls shown in a map by John Speed published in 1610

Bath's first defensive walls were built by the Romans in the 3rd century CE to surround their settlement of Aquae Sulis. By the 10th century CE, the Anglo-Saxons had established a fortified burh (borough) known as Acemannesceastre within the ruins of the former Roman town. The Saxons utilised the remains of the Roman walls in their own defence. These fortifications maintained Bath as a centre of regional power within Anglo Saxon Britain. As the burh was at the northern edge of the kingdom of Wessex, it would have guarded against neighbouring Mercia, which was part of the Danelaw in the 10th century. During The Anarchy in the 12th century, the height of the stone walls was increased on the orders of the Norman king Stephen.

Bath's medieval walls had four gates. The north and south gates were decorated with a number of statues, including the legendary King Bladud and Edward III. The two gates were linked to local churches, St Mary's and St James' respectively.

Map showing Bath's medieval town walls (which were built over the Roman walls), and the medieval Abbey precinct, with the approximate footprint of the Norman cathedral

=== Extant parts ===
The North and South Gates were demolished in 1755, and the West Gate in 1776. Only part of one of the medieval gates survives, the East Gate, near Pulteney Bridge. This structure, restored in the 1890s, is Grade II* listed.

Two short sections of wall remain standing. One is on the north side of Upper Borough Walls, near Trim Street; this stretch survived because there was a small burial ground on the outer side, in use from 1736 until 1849 to receive bodies from the nearby general hospital. The wall was heavily restored in the late 19th century and was designated as Grade I listed in 1950. The second and larger fragment, further south, is behind Manvers Hall on Old Orchard Street and was rebuilt and reduced in height in 1959. The two sections are designated as a scheduled monument.

During the Second World War, bomb damage uncovered parts of the city walls that had been built over. In 1980 a timber barricade was found close to the north city wall; this may have been erected in the Saxon era to allow repair of the stonework. A sword from the late 10th or early 11th century was also found, which may date from a skirmish in 1013.

== Circuit ==
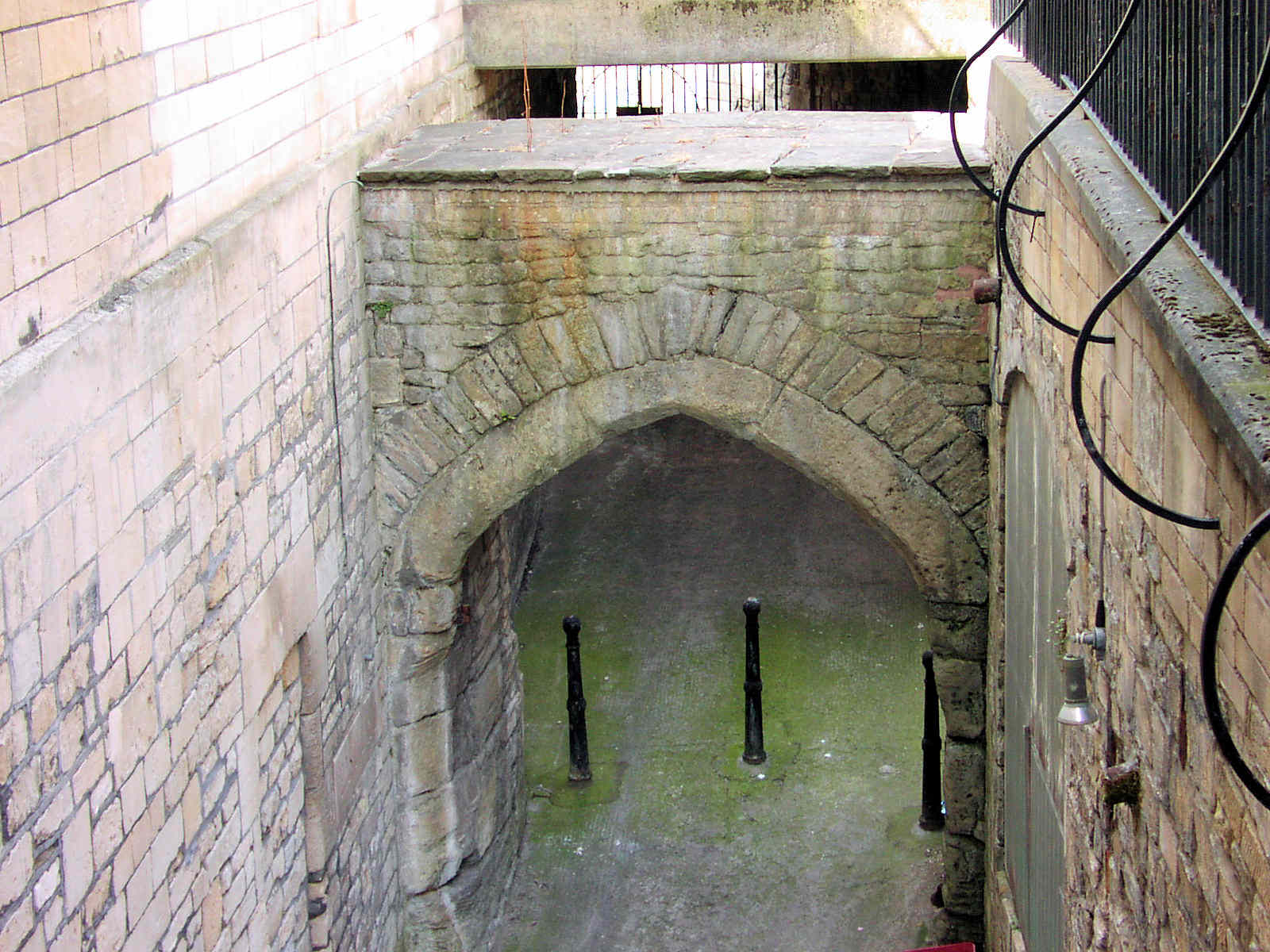
The East Gate

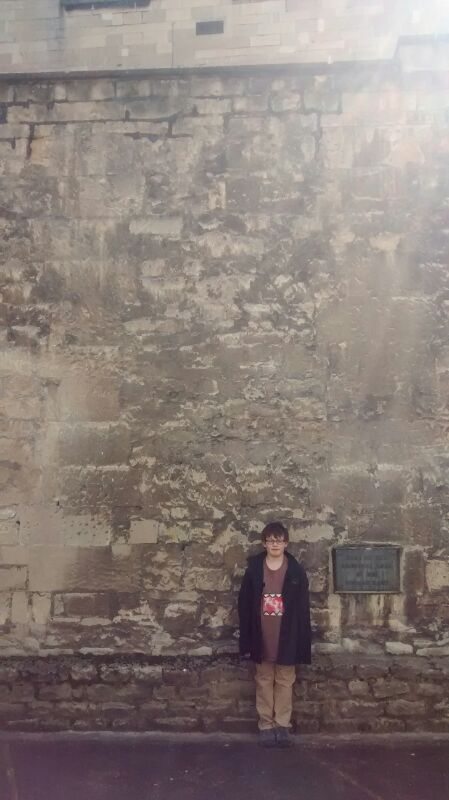
This surviving portion of the wall is hidden by a loading bay off Old Orchard Street and shows the scale of the walls, three metres thick and six high.

Starting at the Northgate and running anti-clockwise, the wall ran along the north side of the Upper Borough Walls street; Trim Street lies outside. A section of the wall was recently discovered below where Burton Street now crosses over the circuit. After passing in front of the Theatre Royal, the wall ran along the east side of Sawclose to the Westgate and continued down the east side of the street called Westgate Buildings.

The route of wall went through what is now the open space at St James's Rampire, and along the south side of the Lower Borough Walls street to the Southgate. Continuing anticlockwise, the wall passed through the southern part of the Marks & Spencers building, where the Ham Gate was, and then through the buildings between (and running parallel to) Old Orchard Street and North Parade Buildings. The route continued along Terrace Walk and to the west of the Parade Gardens and passed under the back of The Empire. At Boat Stall Lane are the remains of the only remaining gate, the East Gate. From here the wall passed under the Guildhall Market, Victoria Art Gallery and Bridge Street, before meeting the North Gate having passed under the buildings at the corner of Bridge Street and Northgate Street.

The route is marked on Ordnance Survey mapping of 1:10,000 scale and better, including on historic Ordnance Survey maps.

== See also ==
- List of town walls in England and Wales
- Timeline of Bath, Somerset
- Chester city walls
- York city walls

== Bibliography ==
- Creighton, Oliver Hamilton and Robert Higham. (2005) Medieval Town Walls: an Archaeology and Social History of Urban Defence. Stroud, UK: Tempus. ISBN 978-0-7524-1445-4.
- Davenport, Peter (2002). Medieval Bath Uncovered. Stroud: Tempus. pp. 62–63. ISBN 0-7524-1965-X.
