= Upper Borough Walls, Bath =

Street in Bath, England

Upper Borough Walls
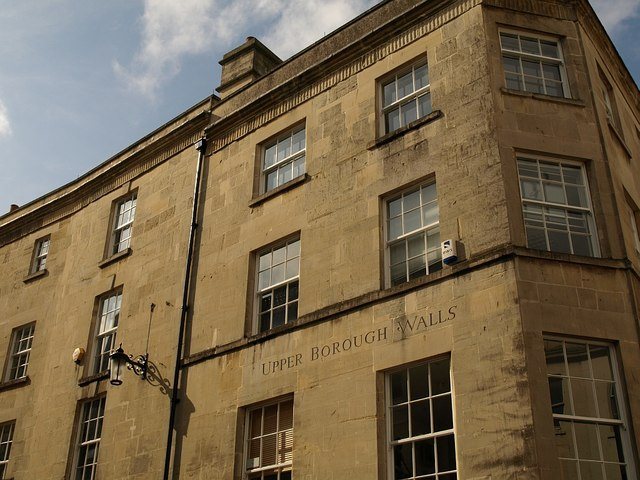

- Location within Somerset
- 51°22′57″N 2°21′39″W
- Location: Bath, Somerset, England

Listed Building – Grade I
- Official name: Medieval city wall, with burial ground
- Designated: 12 June 1950
- Reference no.: 1395446

Listed Building – Grade II*
- Official name: Royal National Hospital for Rheumatic Diseases and Royal Mineral Water Hospital, with railings
- Designated: 11 August 1972
- Reference no.: 1395448

Listed Building – Grade II
- Official name: 10, Upper Borough Walls
- Designated: 5 August 1975
- Reference no.: 1395438

Listed Building – Grade II
- Official name: 11 and 12, Upper Borough Walls
- Designated: 5 August 1975
- Reference no.: 1395441

Listed Building – Grade II
- Official name: Sam Wellers (14, Upper Borough Walls)
- Designated: 5 August 1975
- Reference no.: 1395442

Listed Building – Grade II
- Official name: 1, Upper Borough Walls
- Designated: 5 August 1975
- Reference no.: 1395435

Listed Building – Grade II
- Official name: 2-6, Upper Borough Walls
- Designated: 5 August 1975
- Reference no.: 1395429

Listed Building – Grade II
- Official name: 26, Upper Borough Walls; 12, Union Street
- Designated: 5 August 1975
- Reference no.: 1395437

Listed Building – Grade II
- Official name: Broadleys Vaults Public House
- Designated: 11 August 1972
- Reference no.: 1395444

Listed Building – Grade II
- Official name: Gascoyne House
- Designated: 11 August 1972
- Reference no.: 1395445

Listed Building – Grade II
- Official name: 18 and 18A, Upper Borough Walls
- Designated: 5 August 1975
- Reference no.: 1395443

Upper Borough Walls is a historic street in Bath, Somerset, England. Many of the structures are listed buildings.

It takes its name from the section of the medieval wall of the city which still remains.

The Royal National Hospital for Rheumatic Diseases was founded in 1738 as The Mineral Water Hospital, and is still known locally as The Min. Then, it provided care for the impoverished sick who were attracted to Bath because of the supposed healing properties of the mineral water from the spa. The original building was designed by John Wood the Elder and built with Bath stone donated by Ralph Allen. It was later enlarged, firstly in 1793 by the addition of an attic storey and later in 1860 by a second building erected on the west side of the earlier edifice. It is a Grade II listed building. There is a fine pediment, in Bath stone, on the 1860 building depicting the parable of the good Samaritan.

Number 10 was built between 1800 and 1820, when numbers 11 and 12 were built. Number 11 had a new shop front around 1900. The Full Moon Hotel is slightly earlier having been built between 1780 and 1800.

Numbers 18 and 18A, on the corner of Trim Street were built between 1730 and 1750. Broadleys Vaults Public House and Gascoyne House also make up a listed building.

== See also ==
- List of Grade I listed buildings in Bath and North East Somerset
