= Sydney Gardens Tunnels =

Canal tunnels in Britain

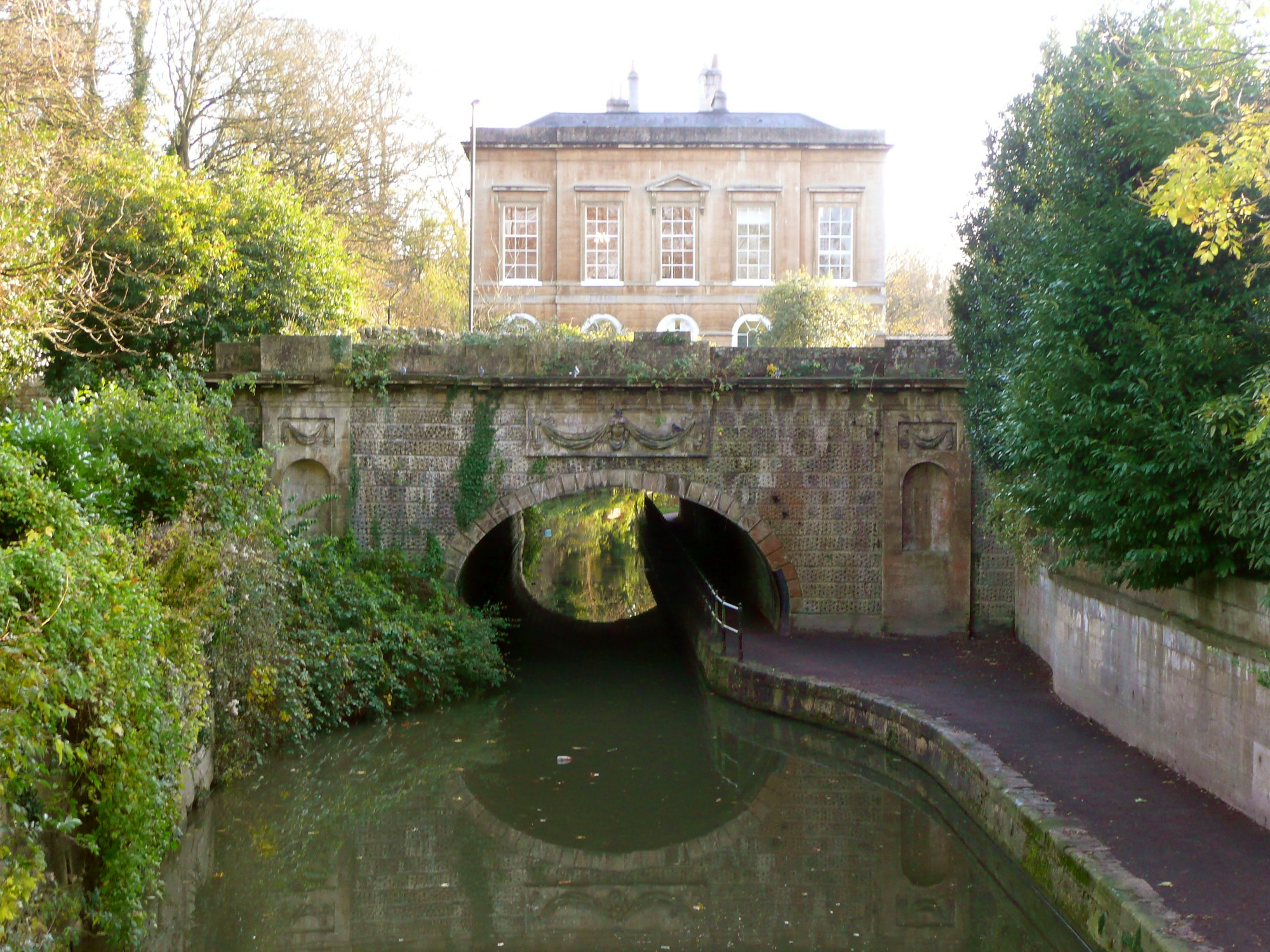
- The No. 1 Tunnel under Cleveland House
- Interactive map of Sydney Gardens Tunnels

Overview
- Location: Bath, UK
- Coordinates: 51.3857°N 2.3479°W (No. 1); 51.3876°N 2.3480°W (No. 2)
- Route: Kennet and Avon Canal
- Crosses: Sydney Road (No. 1); Beckford Road (No. 2)

Operation
- Opened: c. 1800
- Operator: Canal and River Trust

Technical
- Length: 177 feet (54 m) (No. 1); 167 feet (51 m) (No. 2)

The Sydney Gardens Tunnels are two canal tunnels on the Kennet and Avon Canal in Bath, UK. The No. 1 Tunnel (also known as the Cleveland Tunnel) brings the canal into Sydney Gardens from the south and the No. 2 Tunnel (also known as the Sydney Gardens Tunnel) exits the gardens to the north. Both tunnels are Grade II* listed, and are two of three on the waterway—the third being the Bruce Tunnel in Wiltshire.

== History ==
Sydney Gardens in Bathwick were laid out in the early 1790s. The Kennet and Avon Canal was cut in the years immediately following this; the canal's route took it through the gardens. The canal company and proprietors of the gardens entered into an agreement which allowed the canal to take this route provided that the canal company provide tunneling and appropriate ornamental bridges at its expense. The tunnels were designed by John Rennie and constructed in approximately 1800, predating the canal's 502-yard (459 m) Bruce Tunnel by a decade.

== No. 1 Tunnel ==
The No. 1 Tunnel, also known as the Cleveland Tunnel or the Cleveland House Tunnel, is approximately 177 feet (54 m) long. Like similar places in Bathwick, the tunnel and building take their name from William Vane, 1st Duke of Cleveland, who laid claim to the estate of Laura Pulteney, 1st Countess of Bath after her intestate death in 1808.

The northern portal, that which is in Sydney Gardens, is more ornate than the southern and features a representation of Hafren, a water nymph associated with (and eponym of) the River Severn. The Grade II* listed tunnel carries the canal beneath Sydney Road and Cleveland House, the former canal company headquarters.

=== Cleveland House ===
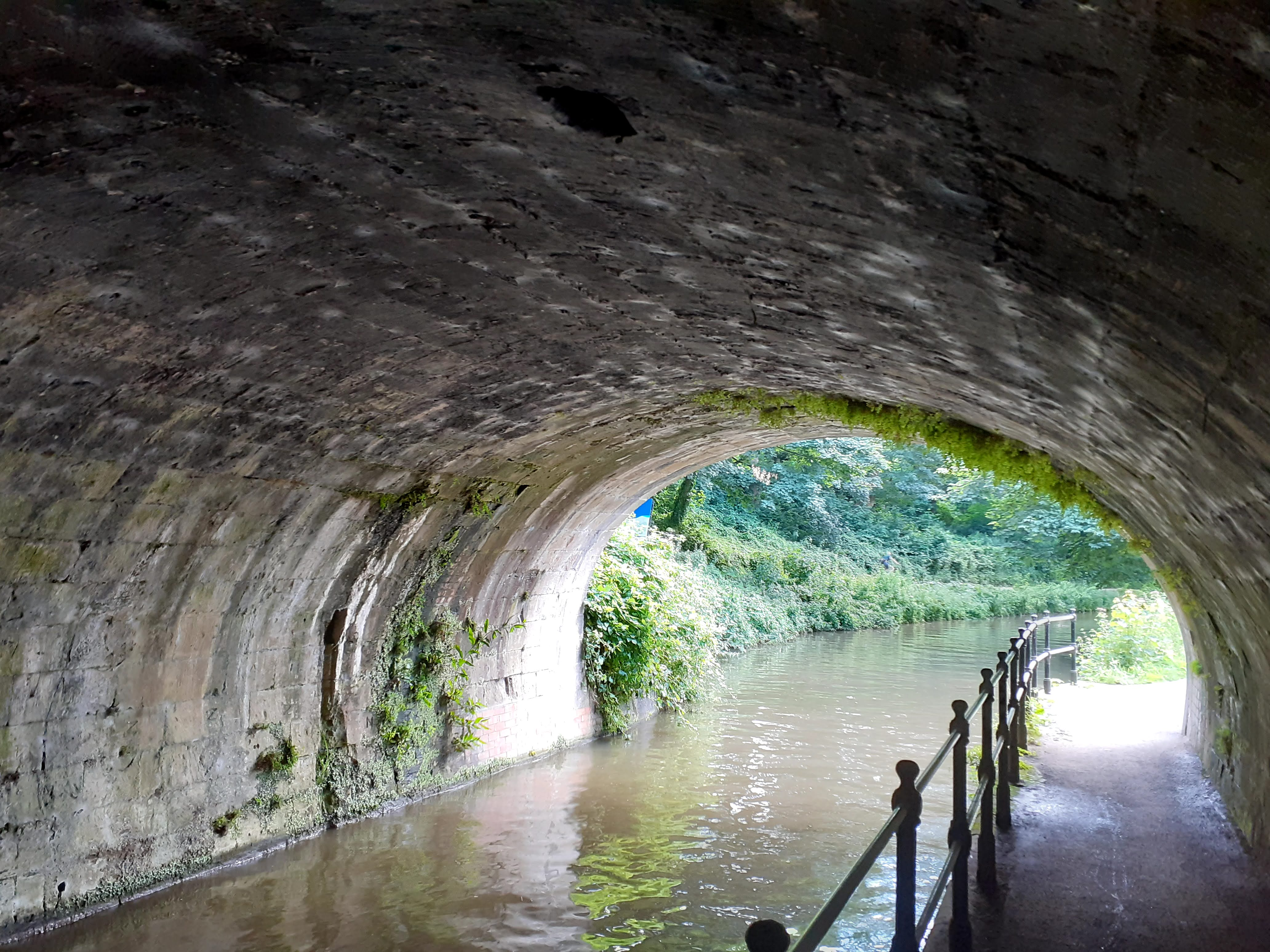
Interior view of the tunnel beneath Cleveland House, showing the hatch in the tunnel roof

Cleveland House was built in the late 1810s, almost twenty years after the canal and tunnel were constructed. It was designed by John Pinch and occupied by the Kennet and Avon Canal Company from its building until 1864. During their tenure, it was known as Canal House. A small hatch in the basement of the building opened into the tunnel; a common (but false) explanation for this is that it was to pass paperwork between vessels and the company offices; it is more likely that the hatch was a refuse chute.

== No. 2 Tunnel ==
The No. 2 tunnel, sometimes known as the Sydney Gardens Tunnel, is approximately 167 feet (51 m) in length and runs beneath the Beckford Road, John Loudon McAdam's turnpike road. As with the No. 1 tunnel, the portal facing the gardens (the south portal) is the more ornate, decorated in the Adam style, and features a depiction of Father Thames.
