= Sydney Gardens =

Public open space in Bath, England

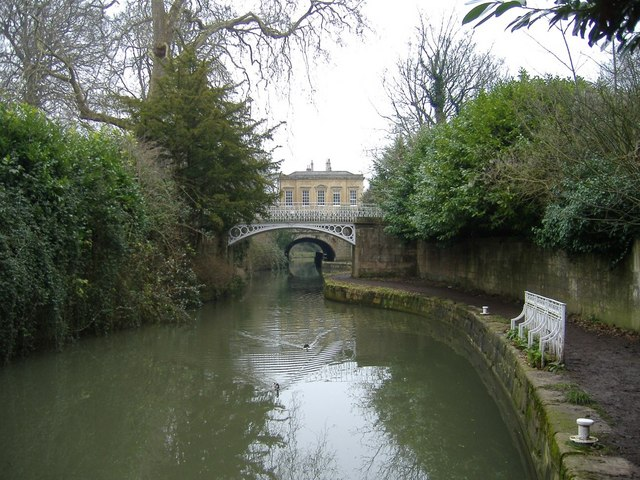
- One of the Sydney Gardens Tunnels on the Kennet and Avon Canal

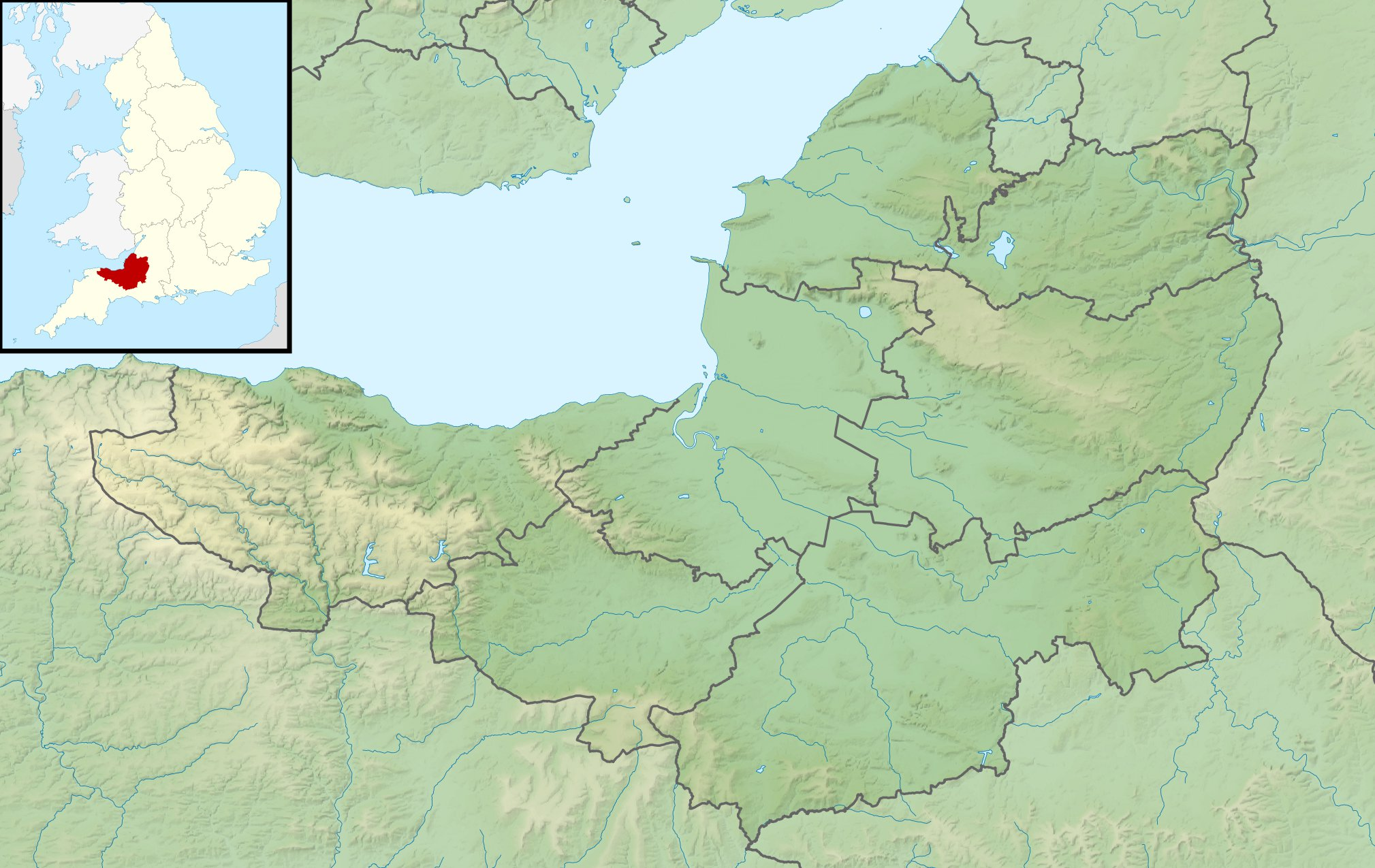
- Location within Somerset
- Location: Bath, Somerset, England
- Coordinates: 51°23′10″N 2°21′00″W
- Area: 4 hectares (9.9 acres)
- Created: 1792
- Operator: Bath and North East Somerset Council
- Open: All year

Sydney Gardens (originally known as Bath Vauxhall Gardens) is a public open space at the end of Great Pulteney Street in Bath, Somerset, England. The gardens are the only remaining eighteenth-century pleasure (or "Vauxhall") gardens in the country. They are Grade II listed on the Register of Historic Parks and Gardens of special historic interest in England.

The gardens were laid out in the 1790s, to plans by Thomas Baldwin which were completed by Charles Harcourt Masters, as a commercial pleasure garden with a variety of attractions. Features included a maze, grotto, sham castle and an artificial rural scene with moving figures powered by a clockwork mechanism. Events included promenades and public breakfasts which were attended by Jane Austen among others. It was also the venue for an annual flower show. The layout was affected by the construction of the Kennet & Avon Canal in 1810 and the Great Western Railway in 1840 which pass through the park. The gardens later fell into decline. In 1908, the site was bought by the local council and reopened as a park. Since 2015, work has been undertaken to improve the environment of the park and provide additional attractions for visitors.

The Sydney Hotel, which was built with the gardens, was the centre for entertainment. It is now the Holburne Museum. Other structures including the walls and bridges connected with the canal and railway are listed buildings along with small buildings now known as the pavilion and Minerva's temple and the public conveniences.

== History ==
After the redevelopment and renaming of Vauxhall Gardens in London in the 1780s, pleasure gardens were opened in many cities in the United Kingdom and later elsewhere in the world. These often incorporated Vauxhall into their titles as with the Bath Vauxhall Gardens. The gardens were constructed in the 1790s, opening in 1795 as a commercial pleasure grounds, following the development of Bathwick by Sir William Pulteney, 5th Baronet, across the River Avon from the city centre. It was funded by selling £100 shares. The original plans were by Thomas Baldwin and completed by Charles Harcourt Masters who included labyrinth, grotto, sham castle and an artificial rural scene with moving figures powered by a clockwork mechanism. The gardens were illuminated by over 15,000 "variegated lamps".

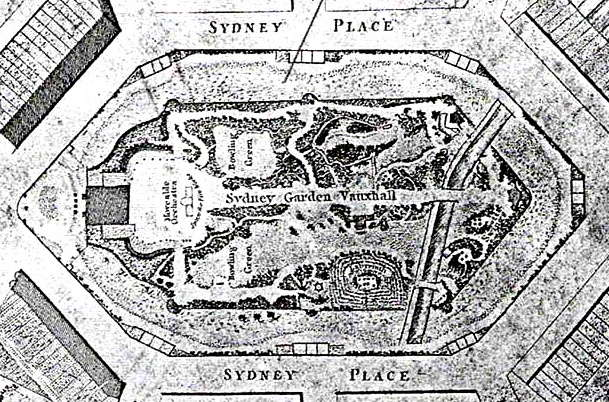
A plan of Sydney Gardens, Bath, as part of the plan of Bath published in 1810

The Sydney Hotel was built within the gardens. It later became the Holburne Museum. The original design for the hotel, prepared by Thomas Baldwin in 1794, was a two-storey building which would serve the pleasure gardens. After Baldwin was bankrupted his design for the hotel was not implemented. Instead a three-storey building was designed by Charles Harcourt Masters. The foundation stone was laid in 1796 and the building was ready by 1799. Visitors entered the gardens through the hotel. Projecting from the rear of the building at first floor level was a conservatory and a semi-circular orchestra with a wide covered loggia below. Two semi-circular rows of supper boxes projected from the sides of the building.

The gardens were used daily for promenades and public breakfasts which were attended by Jane Austen among others. At public breakfasts tea, coffee, rolls and Sally Lunn buns were served at about midday, followed by dancing. There were generally three evening galas each summer, usually on the birthdays of George III and the Prince of Wales, and in July to coincide with the Bath races. During these galas the gardens were lit with thousands of lamps and the guests took supper accompanied by music and fireworks. Breakfasts, coffee-drinking, newspaper-reading and card-playing took place in the ground floor of the hotel and dancing in a ballroom on the first floor. All the rooms could be hired for private parties and meetings. In September 1802 André-Jacques Garnerin took off from the gardens in his hot air balloon.

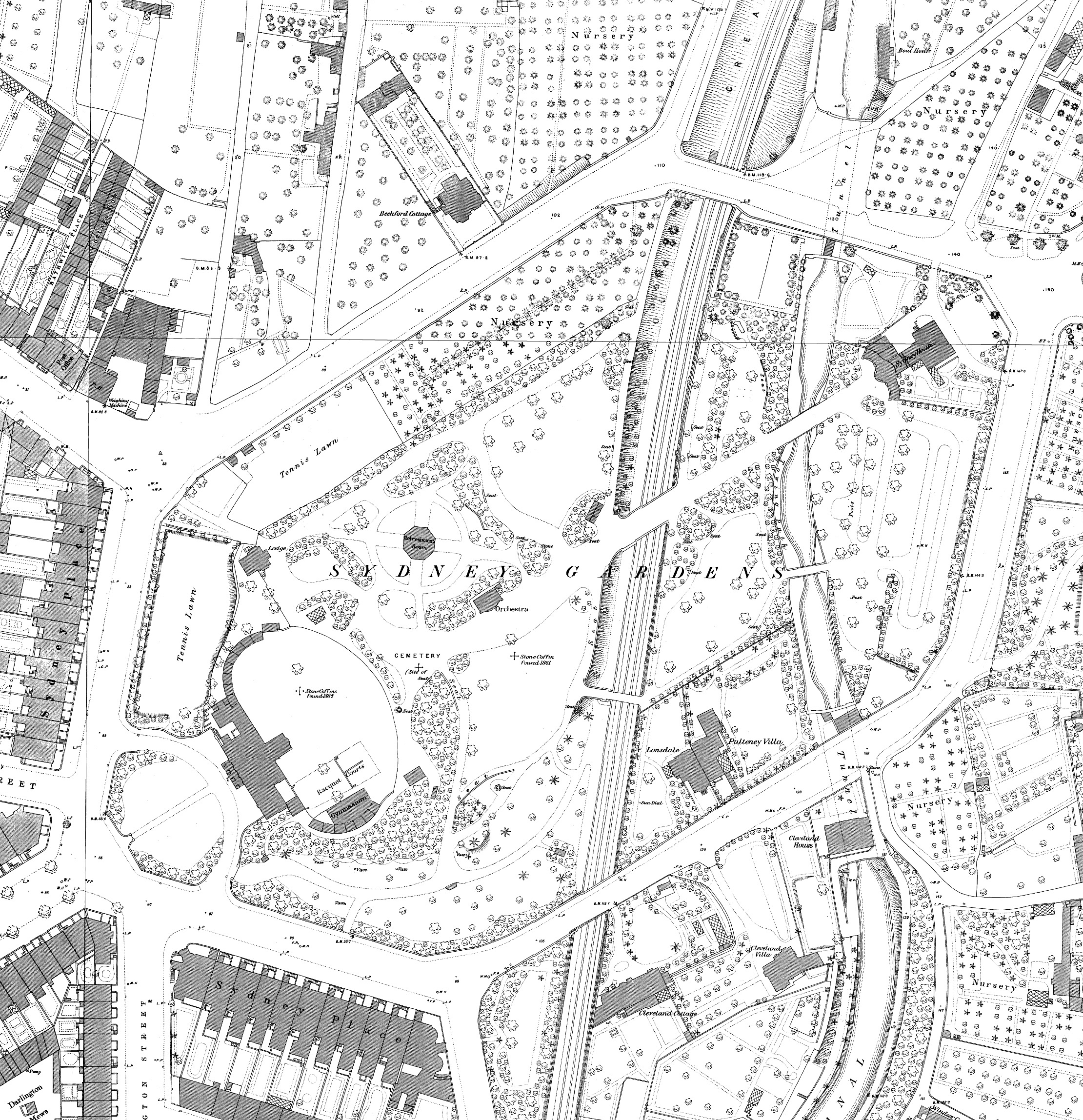
Sydney Gardens with canal and railway, published in 1886

Around 1810 the Kennet & Avon Canal was built through the gardens with the canal company paying 2,000 guineas and being required to include 'neat iron bridges'. Around the same time a clockwork moving model of a village with flowing water, known as "The Cascade" was constructed, however it was not well received and was removed within 10 years. In 1824 an aviary and cosmorama were added to the attractions. In 1840 the route of the Great Western Railway also cut through the area, with the loss of several of the original buildings. In the 1860s a gymnasium and bandstand were constructed and courts laid for tennis, archery and croquet. During the first half of the 19th century the gardens hosted shows by the Bath Horticultural and Floral Society (which later became the Royal Bath and West Show). These were very popular and in 1877 Halfpenny Bridge, a pedestrian toll bridge, crossing the River Avon from Bath Spa railway station to Widcombe collapsed with the loss of about 10 lives amongst a large crowd going to the show in Sydney Gardens.

In 1836 the hotel was changed into a private lodging house and an extra storey of bedrooms added. The two watchman's boxes outside the museum were added around 1840. From 1853 until 1880 the building was let to the Bath Proprietary College. In 1891 the original 99-year lease of Sydney Gardens expired and its financial affairs had to be wound up. The hotel and gardens were then sold, with plans published for the construction of a five-storey hotel to be built on the site. These plans were abandoned when the Empire Hotel was built on the opposite of the River Avon instead.

The site was bought by Bath City Council in 1908 and reopened to the public in 1913. The building remained empty and derelict until 1913 when it was acquired by the trustees of the Holburne of Menstrie Museum. Sir Reginald Blomfield was appointed to carry out the extensive restoration and alterations necessary to render the building suitable for museum purposes. The new Holburne Museum opened to the public on 6 June 1916. Throughout the 20th century the council parks committee carried out some restoration of some of the structures however others were demolished when the cost of repair was prohibitive. In the 1950s concerts and other entertainment events were staged and although well attended did not make a profit.

In 2015 a £250,000 project to improve the environment of the park and public access was announced. This resulted in a grant of £332,000 from the Heritage Lottery Fund and Big Lottery Fund. The grant will be used to provide a range of activities, improve landscaping and restore some historic buildings. A further grant of £2.7 million was awarded in 2018, for conservation and opening up of currently closed areas of the park from 2020. The Loggia, Minerva's Temple and the Edwardian toilets will be restored, and a café and toilets are planned for near the play area.

=== Archaeology ===
In June 2021, L-P archaeologists have announced the discovery of a 2,000 year-old limestone Roman coffin with the remains of two skeletons. The coffin was uncovered in a grave approximately two metres long, 60 cm wide and 50 cm deep. One of the preserved bodies was uncovered in a prone position with the fractional remains of another body positioned at its feet. Explorers also revealed a small pot containing food remains, as well as artifacts including small red and blue glass beads, very likely left as votive offerings.

== Garden structures ==
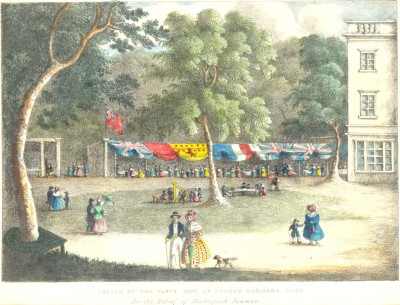
Sketch of the Fancy Fair at Sydney Gardens, Bath, for the Relief of Distressed Seamen. Painted around 1836 by an unknown artist.

The 12-metre (39 ft) high Minerva's Temple was built in 1911 for the Festival of Empire at The Crystal Palace. It was then moved to Sydney Gardens. The front of the building has four fluted Corinthian columns. The pavilion was originally a gardener's cottage or lodge when it was built around 1840, it was later used as a cloakroom. The loggia was built in the 18th century but reduced in size in the 20th.

The Kennet & Avon Canal passes through the gardens via two short tunnels and under two cast iron footbridges dating from 1800. Cleveland Tunnel is 173 feet (53 m) long and runs under Cleveland House, the former headquarters of the Kennet & Avon Canal Company and now a Grade II* listed building. A trap-door in the tunnel roof exists which connects to the house above. A common (but false) assumption is that this was for paperwork to be passed from the canal company offices to the barges. It is more likely that the hatch was a refuse chute. The iron footbridge over the canal was designed by John Rennie and built in 1800 using metalwork from the Coalbrookdale Foundry.

There are also foot and road bridges over the railway which were designed by Isambard Kingdom Brunel and built in 1840, as were the retaining walls. Even the cast iron public conveniences built in 1910, are listed buildings.

== Bibliography ==
- Bond, James (1998). Somerset Parks and Gardens. Tiverton: Somerset Books. ISBN 978-0-86183-465-5.
- Forsyth, Michael (2003). Pevsner Architectural Guides: Bath. Yale University Press. ISBN 978-0-300-10177-5.
- Pearson, Michael (2003). Kennet & Avon Middle Thames:Pearson's Canal Companion. Rugby, UK: Central Waterways Supplies. ISBN 978-0-907864-97-4.
- Snaddon, Brenda (2000). The Last Promenade, Sydney Gardens, Bath. Millstream Books. ISBN 978-0-948975-59-2.
