= Trim Street, Bath =

Trim Street
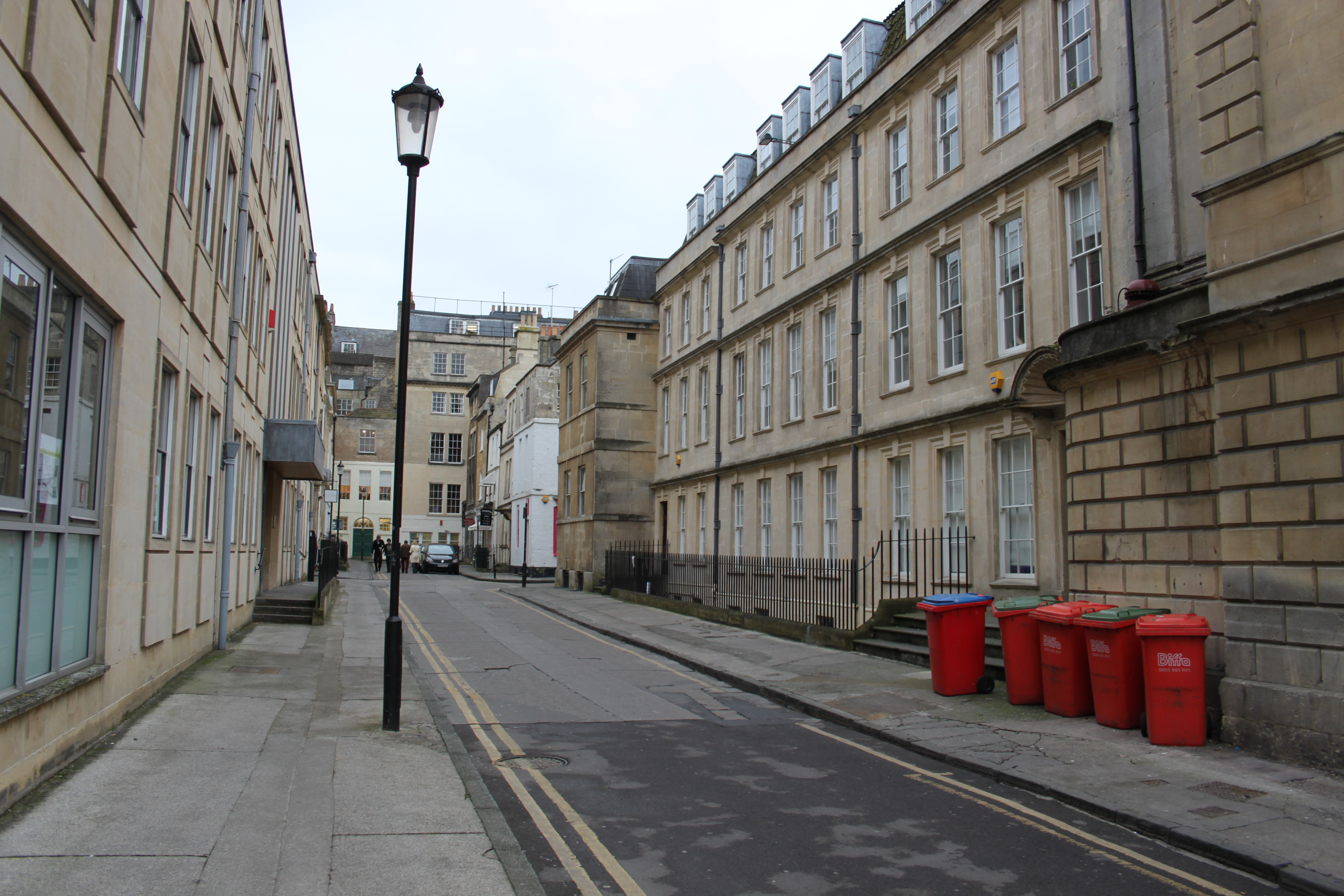

- Location within Somerset
- 51°22′57.2″N 2°21′43.3″W
- Location: Bath, Somerset, England

History
- Built: 18th century

Listed Building – Grade I
- Official name: General Wolfe's House, with railings (Number 5)
- Designated: 12 June 1950
- Reference no.: 1395385

Listed Building – Grade II
- Official name: No. 10 with forecourt
- Designated: 11 August 1972
- Reference no.: 1395393

Listed Building – Grade II
- Official name: No. 11 with railings
- Designated: 11 August 1972
- Reference no.: 1395395

Listed Building – Grade II
- Official name: 15, 16 and 17, Trim Street
- Designated: 11 August 1972
- Reference no.: 1395405

Listed Building – Grade II
- Official name: Nos. 6 and 7 with railings
- Designated: 12 June 1950
- Reference no.: 1395386

Listed Building – Grade II
- Official name: 8, Trim Street
- Designated: 11 August 1972
- Reference no.: 1395388

Listed Building – Grade II
- Official name: 9, Trim Street
- Designated: 11 August 1972
- Reference no.: 1395389

Listed Building – Grade II
- Official name: 12, Trim Street
- Designated: 11 August 1972
- Reference no.: 1395396

Listed Building – Grade II
- Official name: 13, Trim Street
- Designated: 11 August 1972
- Reference no.: 1395397

Listed Building – Grade II
- Official name: No. 14 with railings
- Designated: 11 August 1972
- Reference no.: 1395399

Listed Building – Grade II
- Official name: Former Unitarian Church
- Designated: 12 June 1950
- Reference no.: 1395407

Trim Street in Bath, Somerset, England is an historic street, built in 1707, of shops and houses, many of which are listed buildings. It was named after George Trim who owned the land.

Number 5, which is also known as General Wolfe's house, is a two-storey building with a parapet and rusticated quoins, built by Thomas Greenway. The doorway has Ionic pilasters and a tympanum decorated with the implements of war. General James Wolfe was staying in the house when William Pitt, the elder commanded him to lead an expedition to Quebec.

Numbers 6 and 7 are three-storey houses with a mansard roof, as are number 8 and 9.

Number 10 dates from the late 18th century. It has 3 storeys plus an attic and mansard roof. The doorway has Doric columns and a pediment.

Numbers 11 to 13 form a block of three- and four-storey buildings now used as shops, while the 4 storey block at number 15 to 17 is still residential. Number 14 and number 9 are 3 storey residential buildings.

Jane Austen also lived in Trim Street, although her house is no longer there. This was the Austen family's fourth address in Bath, each progressively cheaper and less desirable than the last.

The Unitarian Church was built in 1795 by John Palmer. The apse was the added and interior altered in 1860. In 1809 the antiquarian Joseph Hunter, took up the post of Minister at the Chapel, there he met and married Mary Hayward, with whom he would have six children.

== See also ==
- Grade I listed buildings in Bath and North East Somerset
