= Nile Street, Bath =

Nile Street
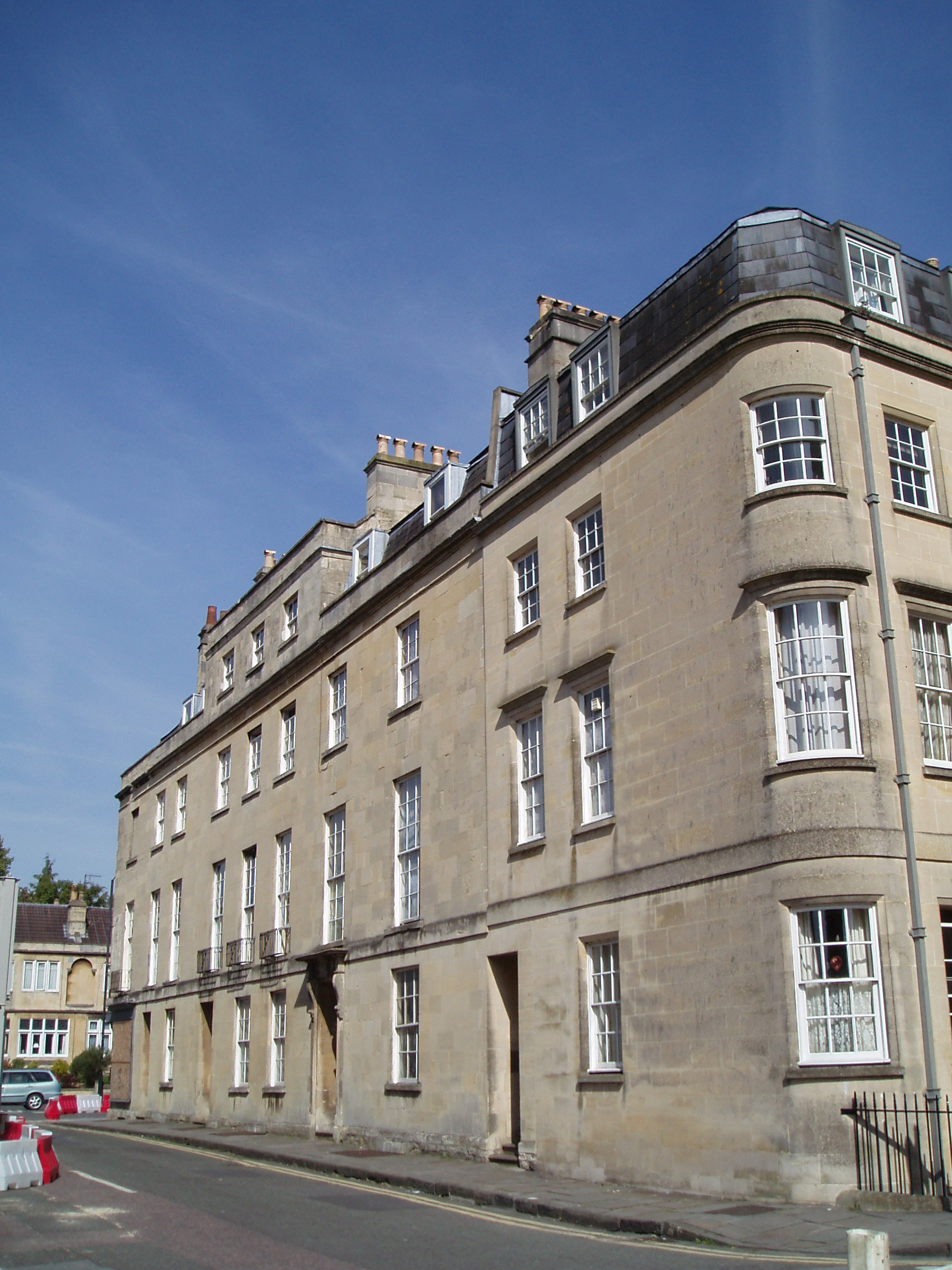

- Location within Somerset
- 51°23′00″N 2°22′10″W
- Location: Bath, Somerset, England

History
- Built: c. 1807 to c. 1814

Site notes
- Architectural style: Georgian

Listed Building – Grade II
- Official name: 1, 2 and 3 Nile Street including Monmouth Hotel
- Designated: 12 June 1950
- Reference no.: 1395730

Listed Building – Grade II
- Official name: 16A and 17, Monmouth Place
- Designated: 5 August 1975
- Reference no.: 1396051

Nile Street in Bath, Somerset, England is a short street of Georgian houses linking Norfolk Crescent and Nelson Place West with the Upper Bristol Road.

On the east side there are five houses, including the corner blocks to Great Stanhope Street (south) and Monmouth Place (north). On the west side two houses were destroyed by bombing in the Second World War and in 2010 there was only one house (No. 1 Nelson Place) on this side of the street, but more were under construction.

== History ==
=== Conception c. 1792 ===
Nile Street is part of an urban development centred on Norfolk Crescent that was undertaken by a solicitor called Richard Bowsher in 1792. A short street was conceived to link the new buildings to the Upper Bristol Road, the main carriage route between Bath and Bristol. The streets of the development were named after Admiral Nelson (Nelson Place), Nelson's home county (Norfolk Crescent) and the Battle of the Nile (Nile Street). The streets were given their names in c. 1800, some years before the Battle of Trafalgar (1805), so the Battle of the Nile was Nelson's most famous victory at that time. The street was marked as Howard Street and Norfolk Street on various earlier maps of Bath.

=== Construction 1807 – c. 1814 ===
==== West side ====
The west side of Nile Street was made up of No. 1 Nelson Place on the south end and No. 1 St Georges Place on the north end, with No. 4 Nile Street between these two houses. There was a gap next to No. 1 Nelson Place due to the garden at the rear of this house. No. 4 Nile Street and No. 1 St Georges Place were not on Richard Bowsher's land and they were built in the early 19th century.

==== East side ====
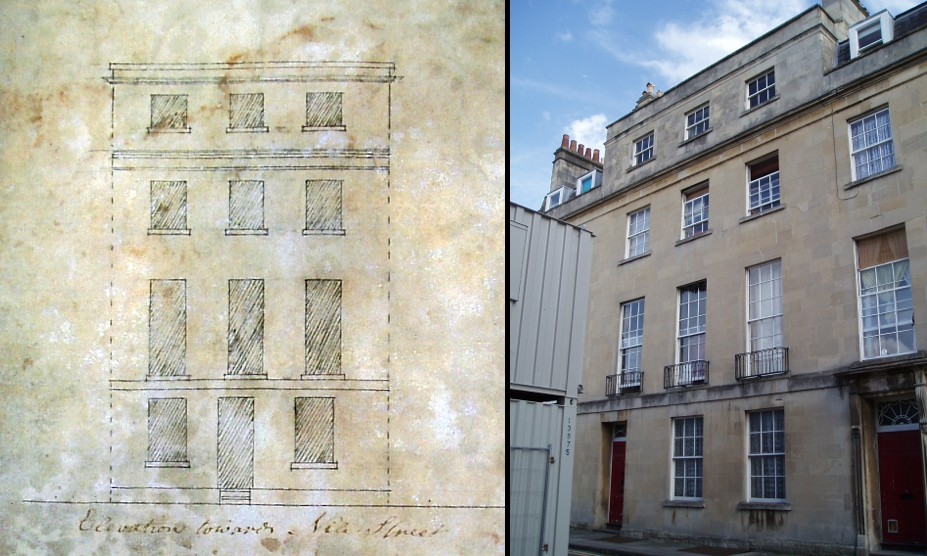
No. 2 Nile Street. A comparison of the facade plan in the building lease with the actual house as built.

Building leases for the houses on the east side of Nile Street were taken out in 1807–08 and these houses were finished c. 1812–14. The architect responsible for the design of the other houses on Bowsher's land was John Palmer (and later John Pinch the elder), but there is no record of an architect for the houses on Nile Street. Only one of the building leases, the lease for No. 2 dating from 1808, has a specified facade plan. The other houses had no specified design, but their uniform facade roughly matches the houses in Great Stanhope Street (at the south end of Nile Street). It was common for builders create their own simple designs without an architect being engaged, so the east side of Nile Street may have been the result of an informal agreement.

The lease for No. 2 states that the house is to be built with the "..front thence of against Nile Street in every respect agreeably to the Elevation, Plan and design of the said Richard Bowsher and which elevation is more particularly described in the plan drawn in the margin.." This house, which is at the centre of the street, has a taller facade with the attic storey brought forward, matching the style of Norfolk Crescent, but more plain. The house itself does not precisely match the design in the lease. The door, instead of being central with a window either side of it, is on the left hand side of the house. It was not uncommon for builders to ignore or alter the plans they were given, which is probably what happened in this case.

=== Bombing and Post-War Development ===
In 1942 during the blitz several incendiary bombs fell in the area of Nile Street. No. 4 Nile Street and No. 1 St Georges Place were gutted, as were the houses on the north side of Great Stanhope Street, including No. 15, on the corner with Nile Street. The Great Stanhope Street houses were rebuilt as a block of flats (called Clarkson House) with a facade replicating the original houses in the 1980s. On the west side of Nile Street, the gutted houses were cleared and replaced by a filling station in the 1960s, which was later occupied by a convenience store. In 2010–11 the site was redeveloped as a house on the site of No. 4 Nile Street and a shop on the corner with St Georges Place. These new buildings were designed to have a very similar appearance to the pre-war houses.
