= Twentyman =

Twentyman is an English-language occupational surname derived from Middle English equivalents referring to men in command of levies of twenty or more men and from later clerical confusion with similar names like Twinterman. Notable people include:

- Collier Twentyman Smithers (1867–1943), Argentine-born English painter
- Geoff Twentyman (1930–2004), English football scout and former player/manager known for his links to Liverpool
- Geoff Twentyman Jr. (born 1959), English radio broadcaster and former footballer, son of mentioned above
- Lawrence Holme Twentyman (1783–1852), English silversmith
- Les Twentyman (1948–2024), Australian activist
- Richard Twentyman (1903–1979), English architect based in Wolverhampton
- William Holme Twentyman (1802–1884), English silversmith
- Percy Twentyman-Jones (1876–1954), South African cricketer, rugby union player, and judge
