= St Mary the Virgin's Church, Bathwick =

St Mary the Virgin's Church
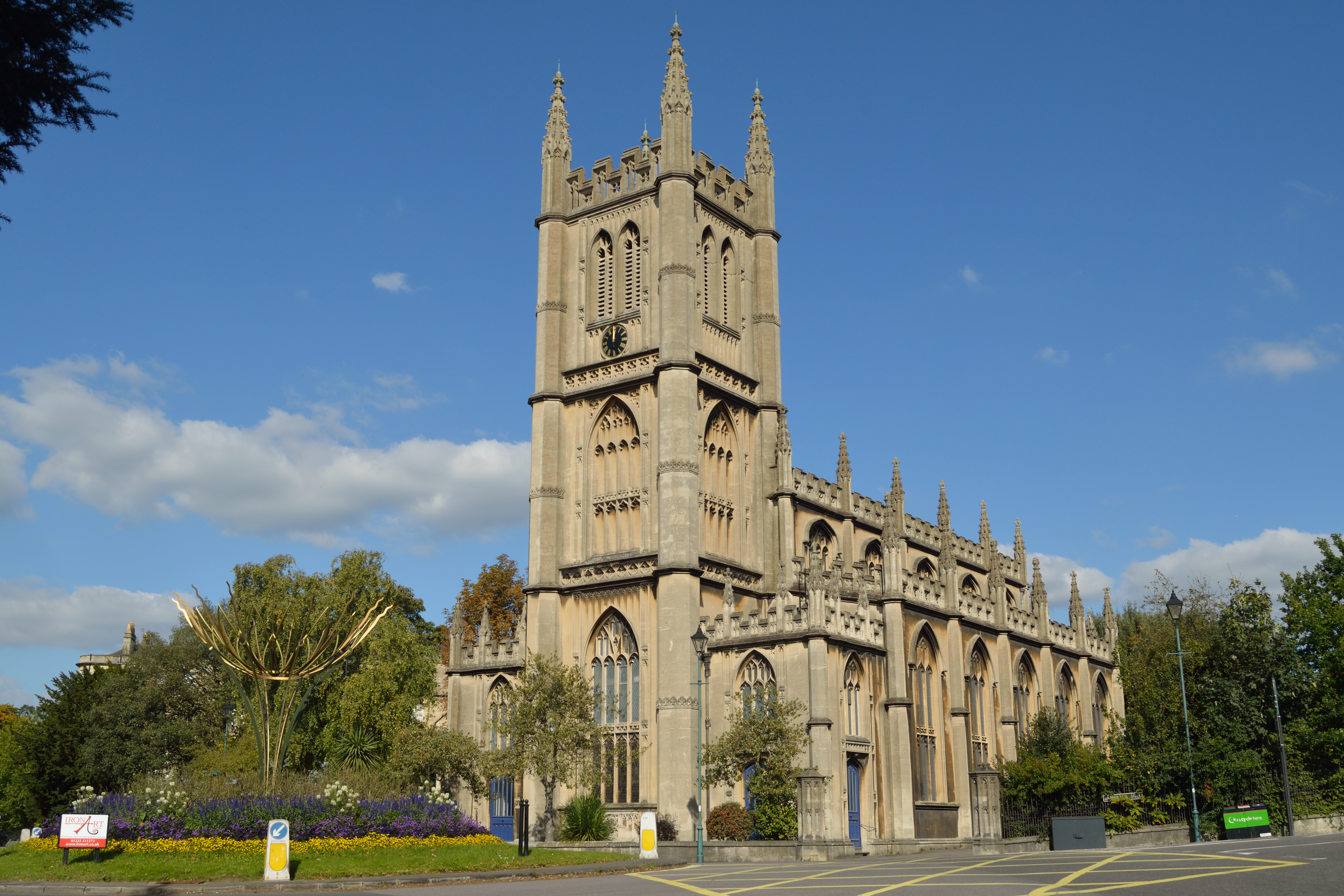
- St Mary the Virgin's Church
- 51°23′3″N 2°21′4″W
- Country: England
- Denomination: Church of England
- Churchmanship: Anglo-Catholic

The Anglican Church of St Mary the Virgin is on Darlington Street in the Bathwick area of Bath, Somerset, England, near Pinch's Sydney Place (1808) and Bath's famed Sydney Pleasure Gardens. The church was constructed by the Pulteney family, who used it to replace the medieval parish church of St Mary's, Bathwick, known even in Georgian times as Bathwick Old Church. The churchyard is now part of Smallcombe Cemetery.

The band Muse recorded the organ parts on their second studio album Origin of Symmetry at the Church of St Mary the Virgin.

== History ==
Bathwick Parish Church and Workhouse Act 1815
- Act of Parliament
- Parliament of the United Kingdom
- Long title: An Act for building a new Church, and also a Workhouse, in the Parish of Bathwick, in the County of Somerset.
- Citation: 55 Geo. 3. c. xcvi

Dates
- Royal assent: 29 June 1815

Other legislation
- Amended by: Bathwick Parish Church and Workhouse Act 1817
- Repealed by: Bathwick Church and Workhouse Act 1847

Status: Repealed

Text of statute as originally enacted

Bathwick Parish Church and Workhouse Act 1817
- Act of Parliament
- Parliament of the United Kingdom
- Long title: An Act to amend an Act of the Fifty fifth Year of His present Majesty, for building a new Church and Workhouse in the Parish of Bathwick, in the County of Somerset.
- Citation: 57 Geo. 3. c. xix

Dates
- Royal assent: 23 May 1817

Other legislation
- Amends: Bathwick Parish Church and Workhouse Act 1815
- Repealed by: Bathwick Church and Workhouse Act 1847

Status: Repealed

Text of statute as originally enacted

Bathwick Church and Workhouse Act 1847
- Act of Parliament
- Parliament of the United Kingdom
- Long title: An Act to repeal an Act passed in the Fifty-fifth Year of His late Majesty King George the Third, for building a new Church and also a Workhouse in the Parish of Bathwick in the County of Somerset, and another Act passed in the Fifty-seventh Year of His said late Majesty to amend the said Act, and to provide for the future Administration and Exercise of the Trusts and Powers thereby respectively created.
- Citation: 10 & 11 Vict. c. ccl

Dates
- Royal assent: 22 July 1847

Other legislation
- Repeals/revokes: Bathwick Parish Church and Workhouse Act 1815; Bathwick Parish Church and Workhouse Act 1817

Text of statute as originally enacted

William Pulteney commissioned a bridge across the Avon when he inherited land across the river in what was then rural countryside. When the bridge was completed in 1774, it encouraged new settlement into the Bathwick Estate and the population increased here. The needs of a congregation called for a new church and a committee was formed in 1810. William Vane, Earl of Darlington, as a patron, provided a site at the lower end of Bathwick hill for the construction of a new church with John Pinch in charge of the design. In September 1814, the ceremony for the erection of the foundation stone was made. This occurred during a lull in the Napoleonic War, and so the inscription stone read:

The most sanguinary conflict ever recorded in the annals of History had ceased, and the downfall of Napoleon, the despot of France, had taken place, when the Nations of Europe became united in the bond of Peace. At such a joyful period……the foundation stone of Bathwick New Church dedicated to St. Paul, was laid…

After this, the nearby Bathwick Old Church was demolished in 1818. On 4 February 1820, St Mary the Virgin was officially consecrated as the place of divine worship for the parish of Bathwick.

== Pevsner's description ==
"St Mary [the Virgin], Raby Place, Bathwick. 1814–20 by Pinch (John Pinch the Elder). The chancel by G.E. Street, 1873–5. Meant to be in the Somerset Gothic style, though of course the result is typical of early C19. W tower with pierced parapet and polygonal pinnacles. Nave, aisles, clerestory, high and a little pinched. Perp[endicular] tracery in the tall aisle windows and the lower clerestory windows with thin four-centered heads. Very tall thin piers of standard Somerset section (four hollows). Three galleries. No arcade arches, but a flat timber lintel running through. This was originally plastered. Ribbed coved ceiling. The chancel not of particular interest. – PAINTING. On the altar early C16 polyptych, four winds, Netherlandish. – The original altar painting, an Adoration of the Child by Benjamin Barker, hangs high up against the W wall. – PLATE. Chalice and Cover 1572; Paten by Fawdery 1723; Chalice and Paten 1837."

== Music ==
The organ in St. Mary's is the only example in the city of the work of Father Henry Willis. The musical tradition of the church dates back to the late 1800s when the Oxford Movement's influence caused the establishment of a robed choir. For many years the reputation of the church choir rode high but during the 1970s and 1980s it proved difficult to maintain the numbers of boy trebles, prompting the formation of an all-adult choir. In the 1990s and into the new millennium the standards once again rose, and the choir of St. Mary's came to be held in high regard, making several recital tours within the UK and abroad, and broadcasting on radio and television.

== See also ==
- List of ecclesiastical parishes in the Diocese of Bath and Wells
