= Cleveland Pools =

Oldest public outdoor swimming pool in England

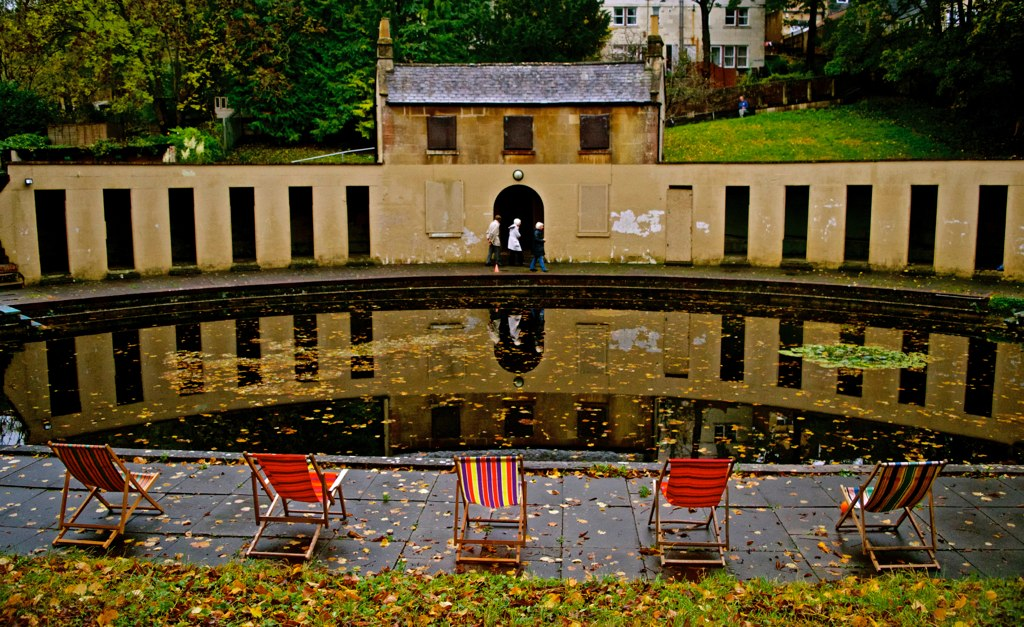

- Location within Somerset
- 51.3908°N 2.3473°W
- Location: Bath, Somerset, England

History
- Built: 1815

Site notes
- Area: 180 square metres (1,900 ft^{2})
- Architect: John Pinch the elder
- Architectural style: Georgian

Listed Building – Grade II*
- Designated: 5 August 1975
- Reference no.: 1396146

Cleveland Pools located in Hampton Row, Bath, Somerset, England is a semi-circular lido built to designs by John Pinch the Elder in 1815. It is believed to be the oldest public outdoor swimming pool in the UK. It is a Grade II* listed building.

In the Georgian period Bath had grown in popularity as a spa town. The opening of Pulteney Bridge enabled the development of Bathwick and land to the east of the River Avon. The pools were built next to the river on the site of old marl pits. The developers went bankrupt ten years after opening the pools but they were sold and operated privately until they were taken over by the local corporation in the 1890s. They then operated as a public swimming baths until the 1970s. The pool closed in 1984 and was used for a short time as a trout farm before closure and falling into disrepair. In 2005 a trust was formed to raise funds for renovation and reopening of the pools. Public support and grants from bodies such as the National Lottery Heritage Fund helped restore the site, which reopened in September 2022.

The original buildings which survive include a caretaker's cottage and changing rooms arranged as a Georgian Crescent. The larger P-shaped pool is 41 metres (135 ft) long, while the smaller ladies' pool is 15 metres (49 ft) long.

== History ==
The baths were originally built in approximately 1815, by a local builder called Newton, from John Pinch the elder's design, on the Duke of Cleveland's land, giving the site its name. They were intended as public pleasure baths, and are believed to be the oldest surviving outdoor swimming baths in England. The area of Bath to the north and east of the River Avon was undergoing development at the end of the 18th century and the beginning of the 19th, after the opening of Pulteney Bridge on land around Bathwick which had been owned by William Pulteney, 1st Earl of Bath. William Johnstone had inherited the land and planned to create a new town. It was foreseen that, along with the access provided by Pulteney Bridge and Great Pulteney Street, the eastern side of the Avon would become popular with speculators and developers, as Bath had become perhaps the most fashionable of the rapidly developing British spa towns, attracting many notable visitors. In the 18th century, Bath acquired its first purpose-built theatre, the Old Orchard Street Theatre. It was rebuilt as the Theatre Royal, along with the Grand Pump Room attached to the Roman Baths and assembly rooms. Master of ceremonies Beau Nash, who presided over the city's social life from 1705 until his death in 1761, drew up a code of behaviour for public entertainments. After 1789, the financial climate did not encourage further building, as the Panic of 1797, related to a period of deflation between 1793 and 1800, was followed by the Napoleonic Wars, which saw the Depression of 1807. These limited the proposed development of new housing in the area for some years.

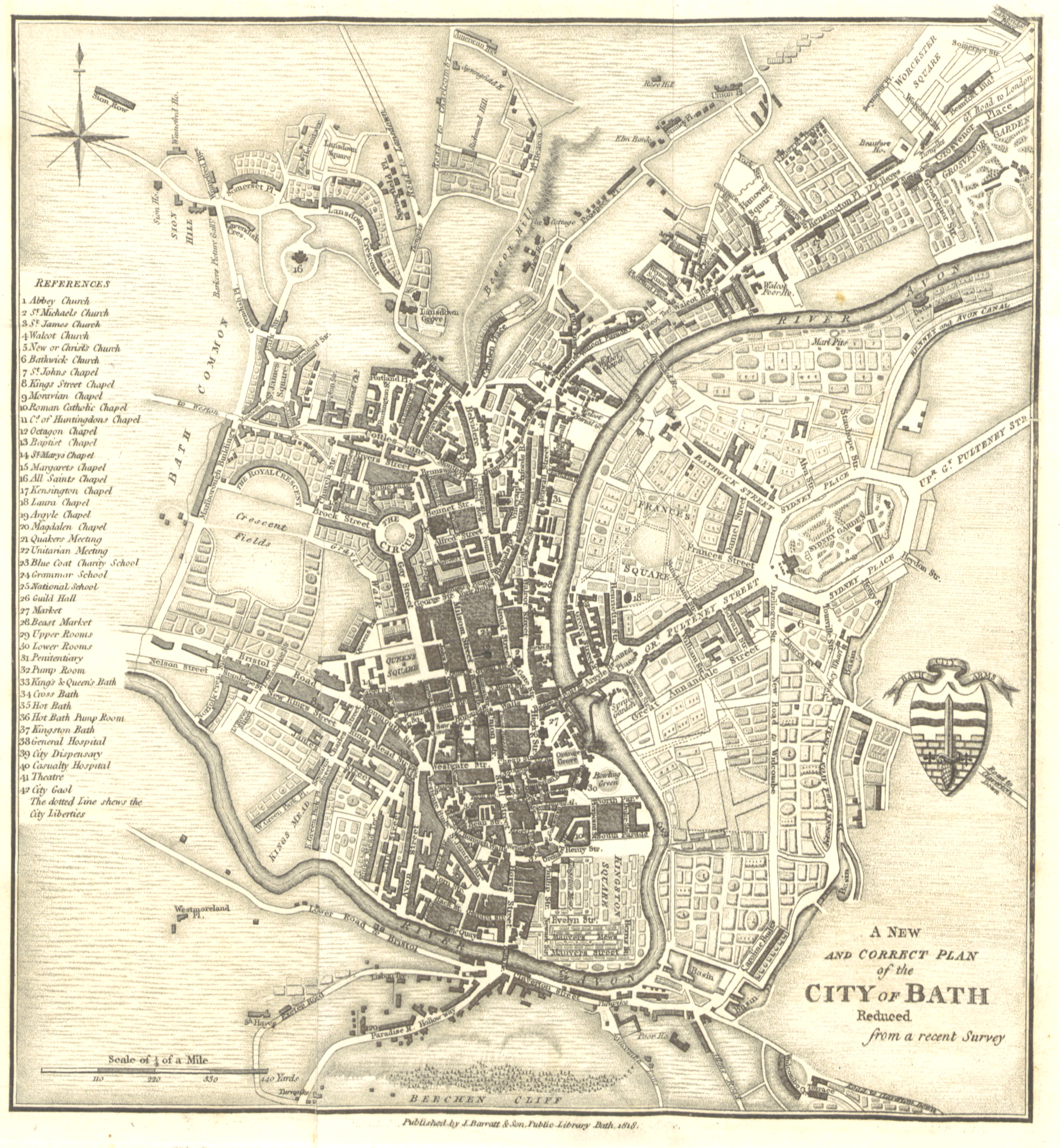
Map of Bath in 1818 showing both marl pits and the pools next to the river, in the top right.

The river at Bathwick had been popular amongst the Bath working class for bathing, including nude bathing, which caused issues for Georgian society as the city grew. Section 34 of the Bathwick Act 1801 prohibited nude bathing in the river and induced 85 private donors to put money into the construction of the baths.

The pool was constructed on the site of old marl pits, between the river, the railway and Kennet and Avon Canal which had previously been used for bathing. A main pool with changing cubicles, a ladies’ pool and a lodge were built. The 1826–1837 cholera pandemic increased demand and a new tepid pool was constructed. It was originally known as "Cleveland Pleasure Pools", and was originally filled with water from the river. This was changed to the mains water supply in 1861, using cast iron pipes to bring the water under the canal.

The position of the pools away from Sydney Gardens and the other attractions in the city centre, added to the downturn in Bath's popularity as a spa town, led to bankruptcy for the developers. The nearby Cleveland Bridge opened in 1826 making the crossing of the river closer to the baths. The site was acquired by Reverend Race Godfrey in 1827. He ran the baths until the 1860s, improving the facilities and providing a ladies' pool in 1827 and another small pool for children the 1850s. In the 1867 the baths were run by a Mr W. Evans who taught swimming, but refused a request from Bath Corporation to make it into a public swimming bath as this would "destroy its prestige". In the 1890s the baths were brought from the owners, The Bath College Company, by Bath Corporation's Waterworks Committee. They were then refurbished and opened to the public. The pool was extended in the early 20th century and shelters were added at the eastern end. In 1967 management transferred to the Bath Spa Committee who concreted the floor of the pool and added a cascade. Competition from the indoor pool at the Bath Sports and Leisure centre which opened in the 1970s reduced the public funding available.

The site was closed in 1978 and leased to a private company; however, the venture failed, and it closed to bathers in 1984. It was for a short time used as a trout farm, but was threatened with demolition, as an alternative to repair. In 2003 Bath and North East Somerset council put the site up for sale or long lease, and it was added to the English Heritage Buildings at Risk Register. A trust was formed in 2005 to rescue the pool from dilapidation. In 2006 its listed building status was raised from II to II* as it is considered particularly important buildings of more than special interest.

=== Restoration ===
In 2013 an appeal to raise £3 million was launched to restore the pools. The fundraising has been supported by The Prince's Trust. The project aims not just to preserve the existing architecture, but also to reopen it as an outdoor lido. This is hampered by poor access to the site and the possibility of flooding. It is intended to make the work sustainable and environmentally friendly, with renewable sources of energy including water source heat pumps using latent heat from the River Avon. A small landing stage is being proposed to enable access to the pools from river craft.

In December 2017 the Heritage Lottery Fund (HLF) rejected an application for a grant of £4.1M. to restore the pools. At a meeting with HLF officers they advised that while they felt that a number of outstanding issues needed managing, they considered the approved plans set out a really strong foundation for the future of the Pools. In March 2018 the Trust submitted another successful application to the HLF, with a programme of:

- Achieve HLF approval; December 2018
- Confirm project funding; spring 2019
- Issue tender documents; autumn 2019
- Commence works on site; spring 2020
- Open the Pools to the public; summer 2022

The restoration cost £9.3 million, over £6 million from the National Lottery Heritage Fund plus additional funding from Historic England, Sport England and several charitable funders. The former children's pool became a terraced area with water treatment and heating equipment underneath.

The pools were planned to be open for a preview swim on 10 September 2022, with full opening a week later, but this was postponed to 24 September 2022 due to the death of Queen Elizabeth II. A water source heat pump to enable warm water bathing, and a river bus pontoon, are planned to be installed in 2023. The pool suffered a number of problems over winter 2022, including flooding and contractual delays, and fully reopened to swimmers on 10 September 2023, though without the heat pump operating.

In 2023 the baths won an Europa Nostra Awards for outstanding projects from the UK.

Flood damage in January 2024 resulted in a further, indefinite, closure of the pools while investigation work is underway.

== Architecture ==
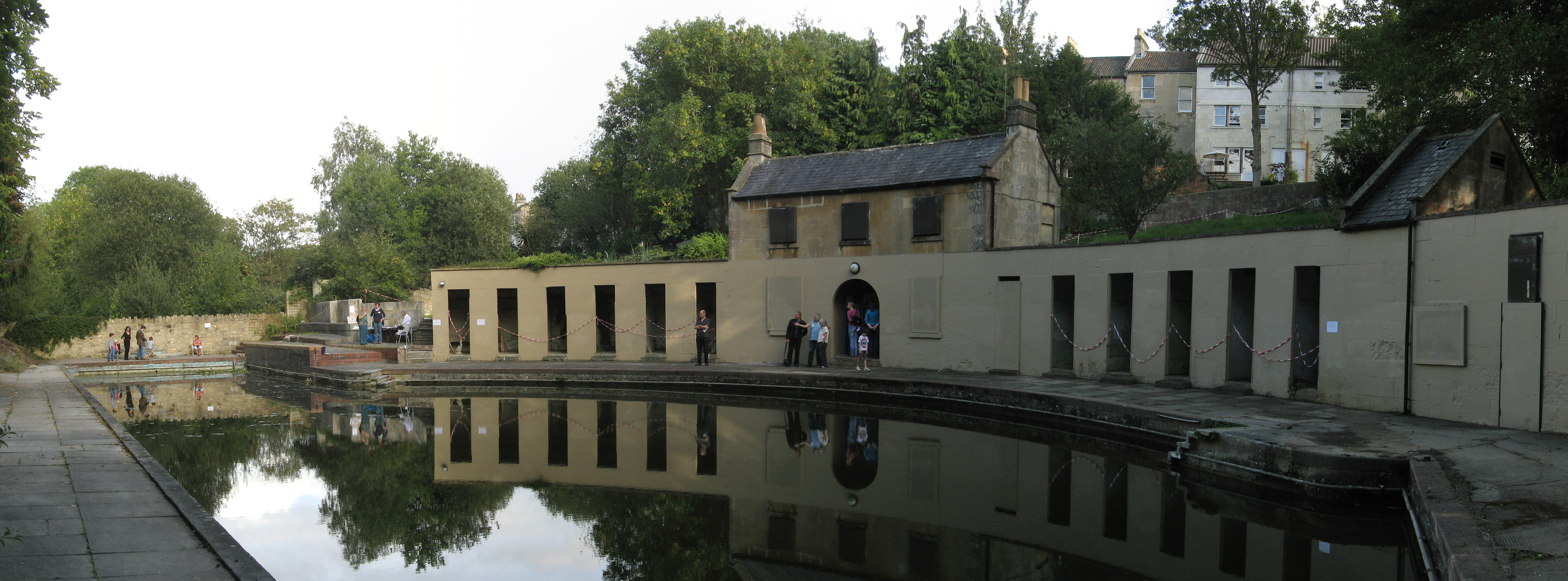
The larger pool, caretaker's cottage and changing rooms

The swimming baths are in a walled garden, which used to include seating, and includes mature trees. The cottage and changing rooms are laid out as a Georgian crescent.

=== Pools ===
The P-shaped pool is flanked by a caretaker's cottage and six changing rooms each side in a mock-Georgian Crescent. It is 41 metres (135 ft) long and 9.17 metres (30.1 ft) wide with an average depth of 1.8 metres (5 ft 11 in). The rectangular upper pool is 15 metres (49 ft) by 6 metres (20 ft) and has an average depth of 1 metre (3 ft 3 in). Both pools have rendered brick walls with terracotta blocks used for the edging.

=== Cottage and crescent of buildings ===
The caretaker's cottage is two storeys high, built of limestone ashlar with a slate roof. It has sash windows to the south and north, with false windows on the east and west ends. Access to the pool is through the ground floor lobby of the cottage. Inside, the original panelled ceiling remains intact as well as a hob and fireplace in the bedroom and another early 19th-century fireplace on the ground floor. On either side of the cottage are six changing cubicles with sloping roofs covered with asbestos sheets. At the western end are two further dressing rooms and the perpetual shower which was linked to the ladies' pool.
