= St Mary's Church, Bathwick =

Church in Bath, England, demolished 1818

Coordinates: 51°23′3″N 2°21′4″W

Old St Mary, Bathwick
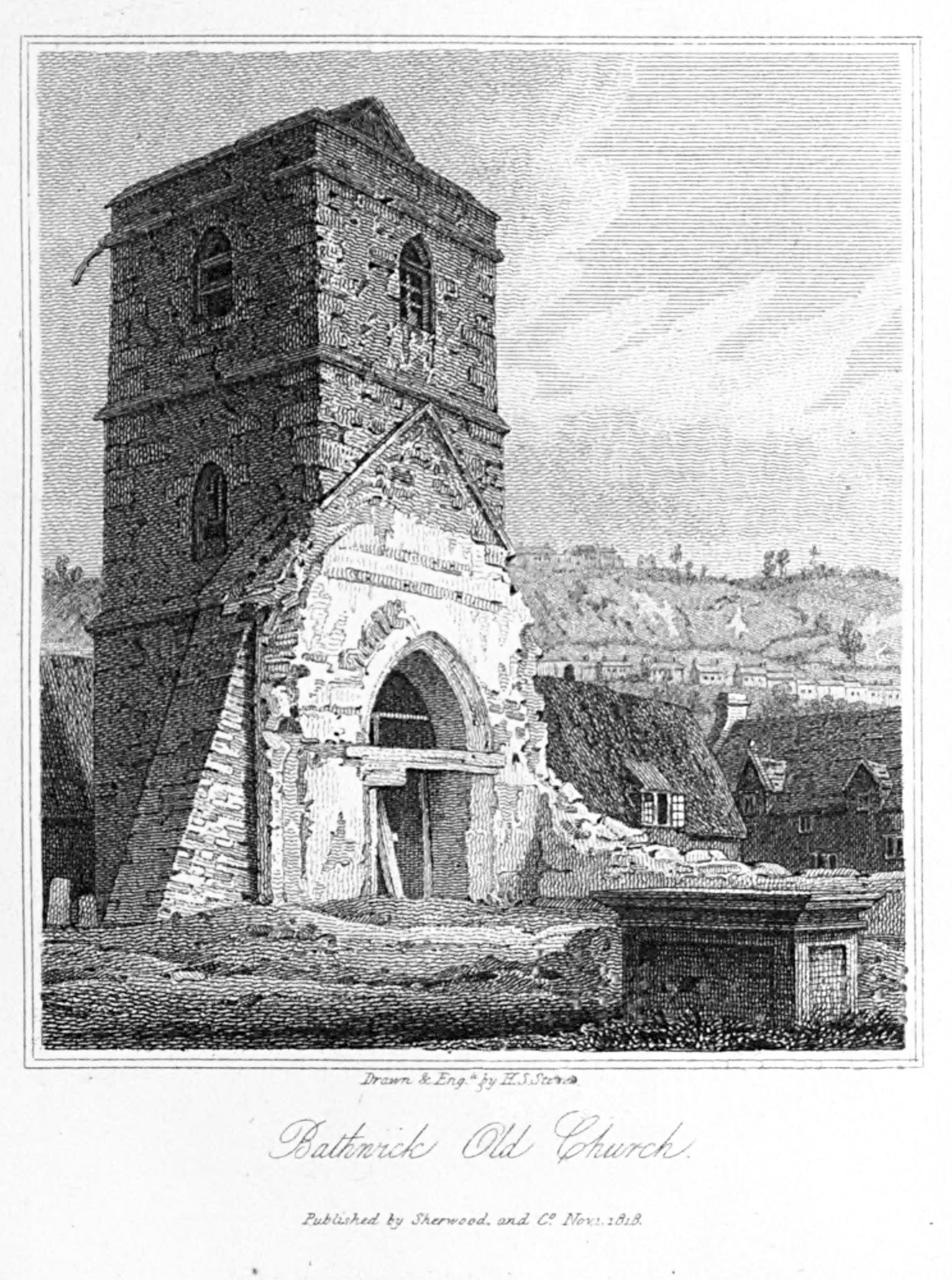
- St Mary's Church in 1818
- Interactive map of the Old St Mary, Bathwick area

General information
- Architectural style: Medieval architecture
- Location: Bathwick, Bath, England
- Construction started: ?
- Completed: ?
- Demolished: 1818
- Cost: ?

Technical details
- Structural system: Heavy Bath oolitic limestone buttresses and piers

Design and construction
- Architect: ?

St Mary's Church, Bathwick (also called Bathwick Old Church) was a parish church in Bathwick in the city of Bath in England. The church was demolished in 1818. Its parish was succeeded by St Mary the Virgin's Church, Bathwick on Church Road at the base of Bathwick Hill. Its churchyard is currently contained in that of St John the Baptist's Church, Bathwick.

Medieval in origin, it was recorded in May 1815 as being merely 64 feet long, 17 feet wide with room for 130 people seated. It featured a dominant Early English tower, a nave and chancel and large nearly triangular buttresses.

By the Georgian era, it was fast becoming a ruin. With William Pulteney's purchase of the Manor of Bathwick estate in 1727, the Pulteneys wished to relieve themselves of the small ruin on their estate, but waited until they had developed the property. By 1814, the new parish church of St Mary the Virgin, Bathwick at the base of Bathwick Hill was completed. The designer of that church, John Pinch the Elder, was shortly employed by the Pulteney family to demolish the medieval Mary's, then called Bathwick Old Church, which he carried out in January 1818.

Many of the stones, as well as the altar, pulpit and roof timbers, were recycled to construct St Mary the Virgin Parish Church's new mortuary chapel, which was also designed by Pinch the Elder. However, this new chapel never was licensed to perform marriages and only occasionally performed funerals and baptisms. It is now bricked in, abandoned, and thoroughly decrepit.

The churchyard and many of the burial plots of Bathwick Old Church still exists in St John the Baptist, Bathwick Churchyard. The east end of the Victorian church of St John's now occupies the west end tower location of Bathwick Old Church. The entirety of St. John's was designed to fit in the old church's space.
