= Nelson Place West =

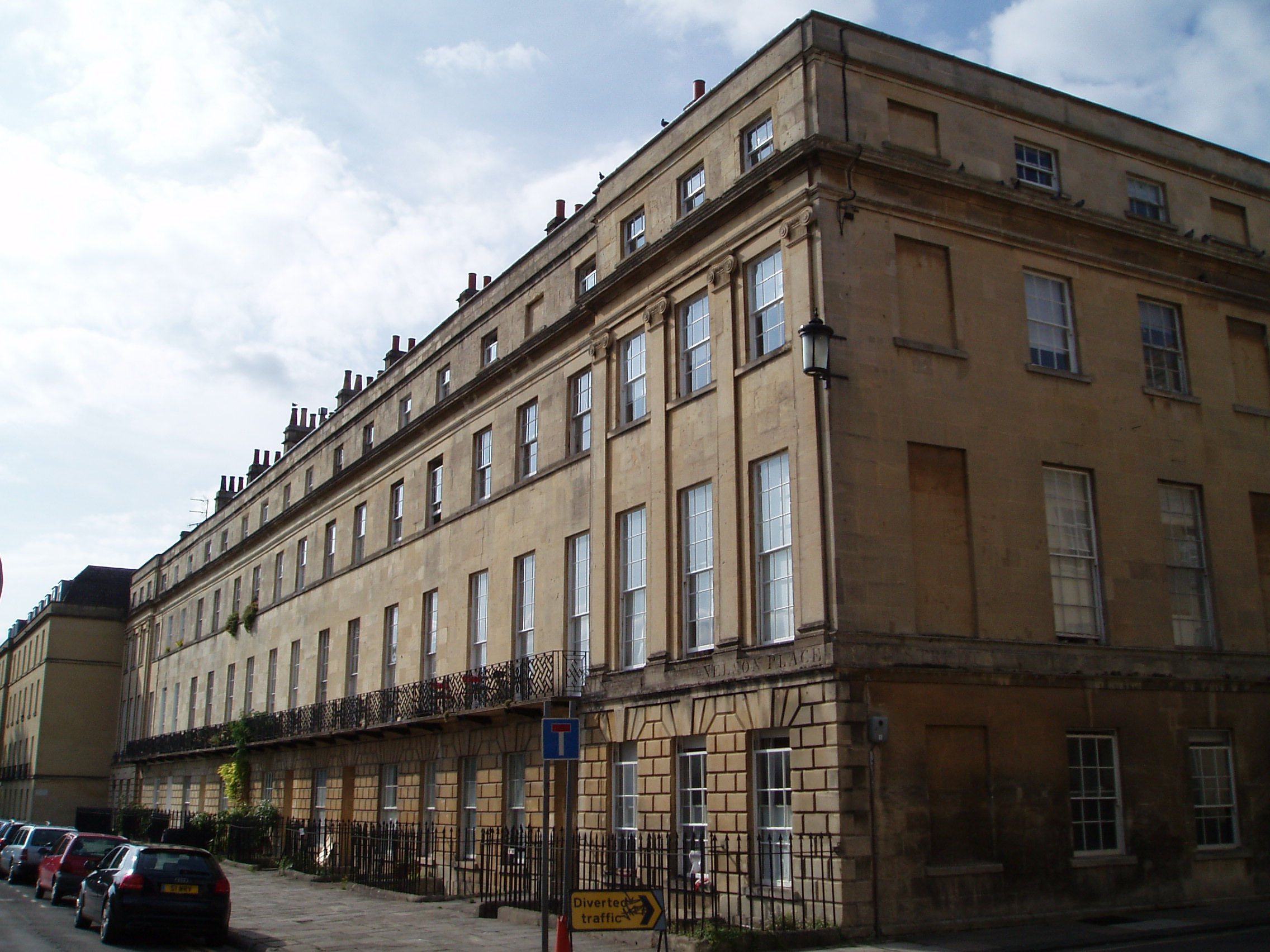

- Location within Somerset
- 51°23′00″N 2°22′12″W
- Location: Bath, Somerset, England

History
- Built: c. 1800 to c. 1835

Site notes
- Architect(s): John Palmer and John Pinch
- Architectural style: Georgian

Listed Building – Grade II
- Official name: 1-8, Nelson Place West
- Designated: 12 June 1950
- Reference no.: 1396284

Nelson Place West is a Grade II listed Georgian terrace of houses in Bath, Somerset, England. It was built as "Nelson Place" in the early 19th century, and the suffix "West" was added to avoid confusion with Nelson Place East on the other side of the city. The end houses (Nos. 1 and 9) have Ionic pilasters and there is a wrought iron balcony on the second floor of Nos. 2–8. These features match the adjacent Norfolk Crescent, which was built as part of the same urban development.

On the western end of the Georgian terrace there is a 1970s block of flats called Nelson House and further down the street (to the west) there is a row of Victorian houses called Nelson Villas.

== History ==
=== Original design (c. 1792-c. 1817) ===
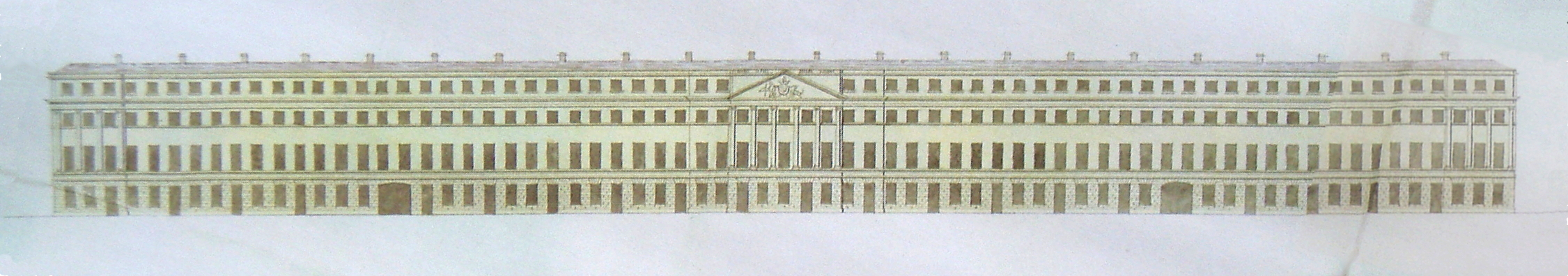
A drawing of the intended facade for Nelson Place, dated 1807.

Nelson Place, which was named after Admiral Nelson, was part of a larger development that also included Nile Street (named after the Battle of the Nile, one of Nelson's victories) and Norfolk Crescent (the centrepiece of the development, named after Nelson's home county). The architect who designed the matching facades of Nelson Place and Norfolk Crescent was probably John Palmer.

Palmer's design for Nelson Place was a terrace of 23 houses, each 3 windows wide. The two end houses were to have ionic pilasters and the central houses were to have a pediment, identical to the facade of Norfolk Crescent. The terrace was to be completely level, but the ground slopes down towards the river (at the west end of the row) so the street would have been built up on vaults, as at the south end of Norfolk Crescent. Each house was five storeys high (basement, ground floor, piano nobile, second floor and attic). Unlike many other Bath houses, the attic windows are in the main facade, not in the roof. This makes the building look taller and more impressive.

The first two houses (Nos. 1 and 2) were built in the early 19th century and completed c. 1817 but a financial crisis (resulting from the Bath Bank crash in 1793) meant that Bath developers were struggling to raise money for new houses.

=== Reduced design (c. 1820-c. 1835) ===
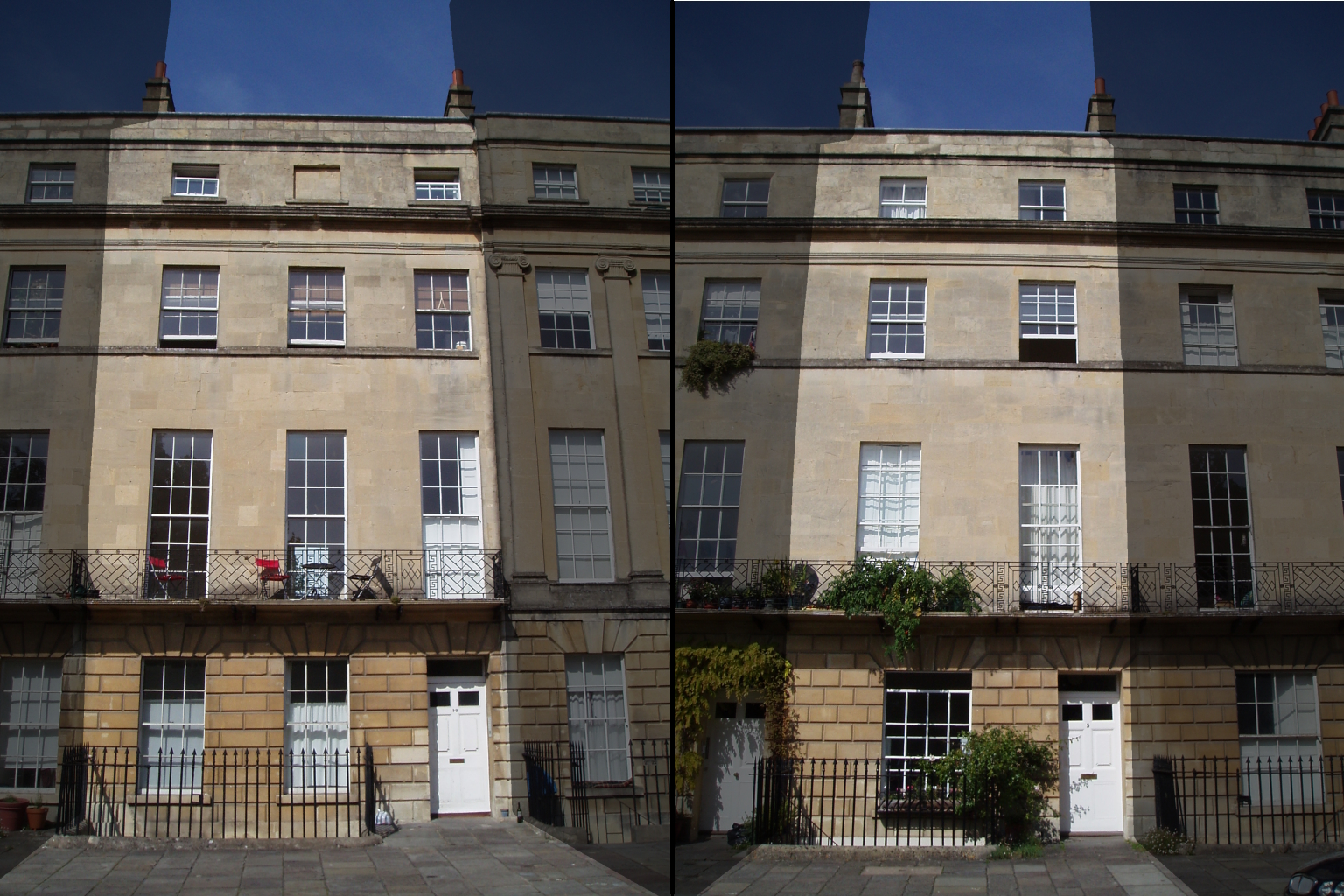
No. 2 (left) and No. 5 (right) Nelson Place, showing the reduction in width from Palmer's design (left) to Pinch's design (right).

Nos. 1 and 2 Nelson Place were first leased c. 1817, but it was no easy task to raise funds for the other planned 21 houses in the terrace. As a result, it was decided that the terrace could be continued with smaller houses. The new design, probably the work of John Pinch the elder, had houses that were 2 windows wide, to attract middle class rather than upper class occupants. The ground floor window (which is larger than the others) and the door are offset from the upper windows. Pinch designed very similar terraces elsewhere in Bath, such as Raby Place (Bathwick Hill). Four houses (Nos. 3–6) were built in this style and completed c. 1827 and a further two houses (Nos. 7 and 8) were built slightly later and completed c. 1835. By this time the demand for town houses was dropping and no more houses were built in Nelson Place.

=== Nelson Villas (19th century) ===
The Georgian terrace was left uncompleted and in the second half of the 19th century a row of Victorian terraced houses called Nelson Villas was built at the west end of the street. These houses, two storeys high with front gardens, are very different to the Georgian terrace with its tall imposing facade.

=== Nelson House and No. 9 (c. 1973) ===
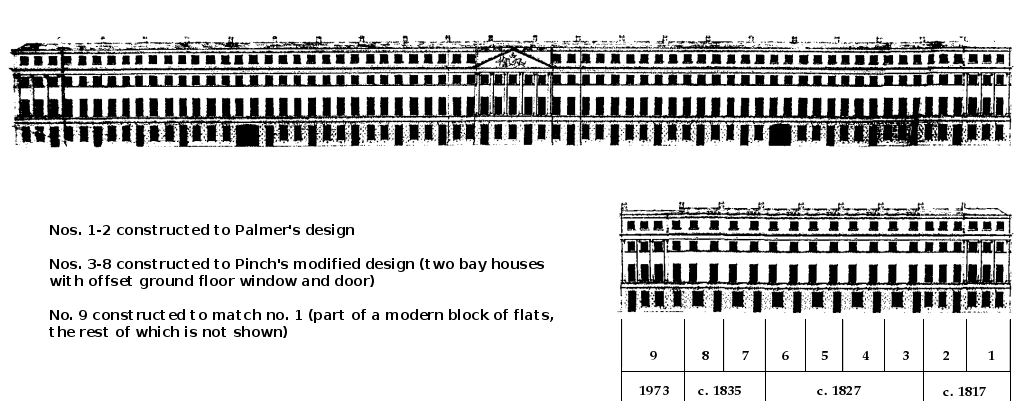
Palmer's plan for Nelson Place (top) compared with the terrace that exists today (bottom).

In the 1970s a modern block of flats (Nelson House) was built in the gap between the Georgian and Victorian terraces. As part of this block of flats a single house (No. 9) was added to the end of Nelson Place, with a facade matching No. 1. This pilastered end house lends the Georgian terrace visual symmetry and gives the false impression that the truncated Georgian terrace was the intended final form of the street.

Today Nos. 1 and 2 have been combined into a single house, which contains flats. The door to No. 1, which faced onto Nile Street, has been replaced with a window and the staircase inside No. 1 has been removed, so the flats in both houses are accessed via the door and staircase of No. 2. Nos. 3 and 4 have also been combined for conversion into flats, the door and staircase of No. 3 having been removed. The outline of the old doorways to No. 1 and No. 3 can still be made out.

== Notable residents ==
In 1839 Sir Isaac Pitman, the inventor of shorthand, moved into No. 5 Nelson Place West. He set up a printing press there and used the house for his phonetic institute. In 1851 he moved to a larger house elsewhere in Bath. In 1859, he moved his printing press to a factory on Lower Bristol Road, not far from Nelson Place. The company he set up, called LIBERfabrica is still located on these premises.

Vice-Admiral Henry Gordon (d.1856) lived at No. 1 Nelson Place from 1829 until his death in 1856. Gordon was present at the Glorious First of June naval battle and (as a lieutenant) he was in command of HMS Wolverine when she was captured by the French in 1804. Henry Gordon also served two terms as the Mayor of Bath.
