= Norfolk Crescent, Bath =

Norfolk Crescent
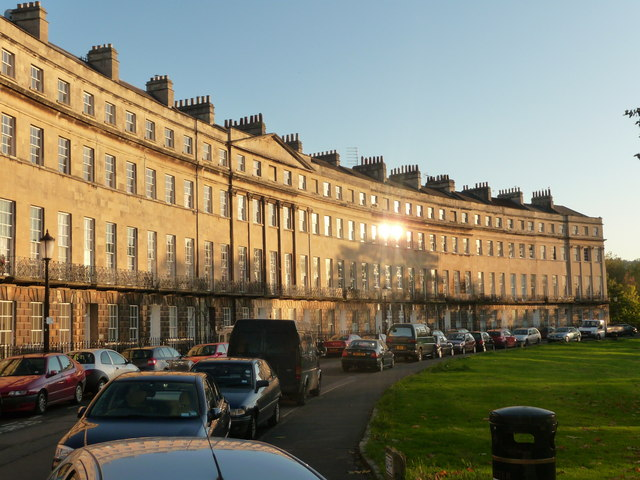

- Location within Somerset
- 51°22′57″N 2°22′12″W
- Location: Bath, Somerset, England

History
- Built: c.1792 to c.1822

Site notes
- Architect(s): John Palmer and John Pinch
- Architectural style: Georgian

Listed Building – Grade II*
- Official name: Cumberland House
- Designated: 12 June 1950
- Reference no.: 1395744

Listed Building – Grade II*
- Official name: 8–18, Norfolk Crescent
- Designated: 12 June 1950
- Reference no.: 1395745

Listed Building – Grade II*
- Official name: Watchman's Box
- Designated: 12 June 1950
- Reference no.: 1395748

Norfolk Crescent in Bath, Somerset, England, was built between c.1793 and c.1822 and has been designated as a Grade II* listed building. The original design was by John Palmer, but minor alterations were later made by John Pinch the elder.

The Georgian terrace includes numbers 1 to 7, which have been converted into flats known as Cumberland House, and numbers 8 to 18 consecutively. Each has five storeys (basement, ground floor, piano nobile, second floor and attic) and the central portion has 6 Ionic pilasters.

There is a green area in front of the crescent that was originally a formal garden for the residents, surrounded by railings. A small circular building in the corner of the gardens is the old watchman's hut, and is also Grade II* listed.

== History ==
=== Richard Bowsher's development ===
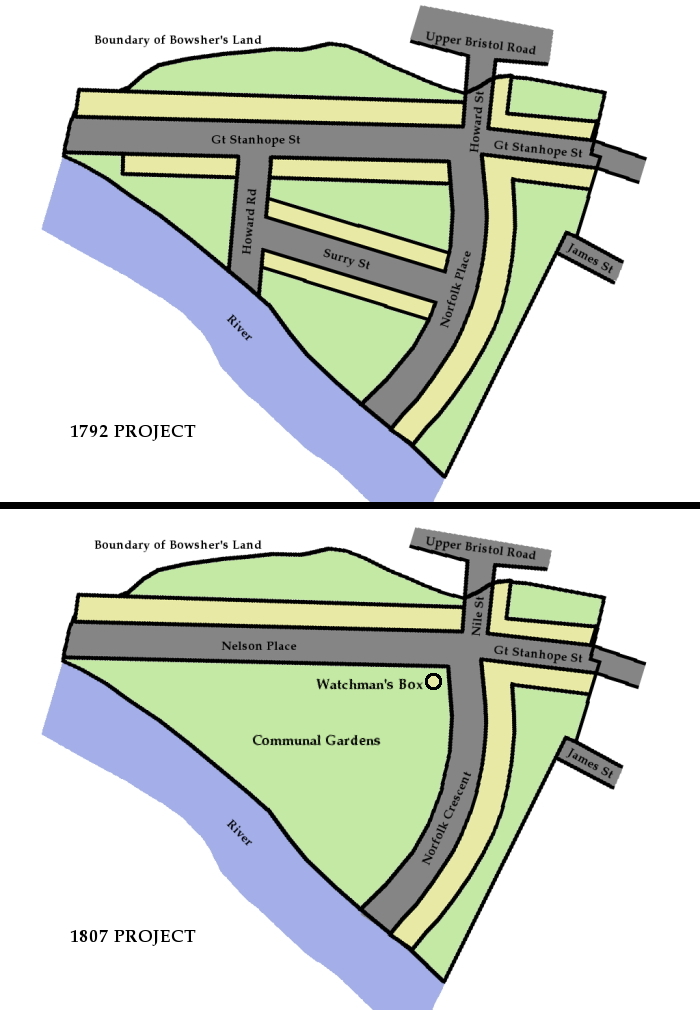
Bowsher's plans for the Norfolk Crescent development

In March 1792 a solicitor named Richard Bowsher took a lease on 5 acres (20,000 m^{2}) of land next to the River Avon at what was then the western edge of the city of Bath. The lease stipulated houses of similar style and quality to those being erected in the nearby New King Street should be built on the land. As with other Bath developers, Bowsher's sub-leased plots of ground to craftsmen, on the condition that they would build houses on them, which would subsequently be let out to wealthy families. Several streets were planned with over 100 houses, the centrepiece being a crescent called Norfolk Place (later changed to Norfolk Crescent). The architect John Palmer was engaged to designed a facade for the buildings.

However, in early 1793 a financial crisis, caused by the Bath Bank crash, brought disaster. Some of the builders went bankrupt and others were reluctant to take on new projects. None of Bowsher's houses were complete, but he had to continue paying rent for the land. Nevertheless, he survived the crash and in the 19th century the development was scaled down to a reduced plan with two main streets, Norfolk Crescent and Nelson Place, and the short Nile Street linking to the Upper Bristol Road to the north. These streets were named after Admiral Nelson, his home county (Norfolk) and his most famous victory to date (the Battle of the Nile, since the name was chosen before the Battle of Trafalgar was fought in 1805). The proposed streets in front of the crescent were abandoned and instead the area was made into a formal garden for the residents of Norfolk Crescent and Nelson Place, with each house paying £2.2 annual rent for their upkeep. At the corner of the railed gardens, where Norfolk Crescent, Nile Street, Great Stanhope Street and Nelson Place meet, a watchman's hut was built. The watchman's hut was built to a classical design inspired by the Choragic Monument of Lysicrates. The renewed scheme also saw a new architect, John Pinch, making some minor alterations to the design.

Even after the reduction in scale the work progressed slowly. The houses in Norfolk Crescent were gradually completed and occupied, but the last house was not finished until 1822 – thirty years after it had been planned. The houses in Nile Street and in Bowsher's part of Great Stanhope Street were built between 1810 and 1820, but the houses in Nelson Place were not started until later. Nos. 1 and 2 were built as large houses (matching Norfolk Crescent) and the others were smaller, cheaper houses designed by Pinch but even using these houses it was not possible to complete the row. Thus, Bowsher's development was largely complete by the 1830s, albeit in a reduced form compared with the original plan.

=== Palmer's design ===
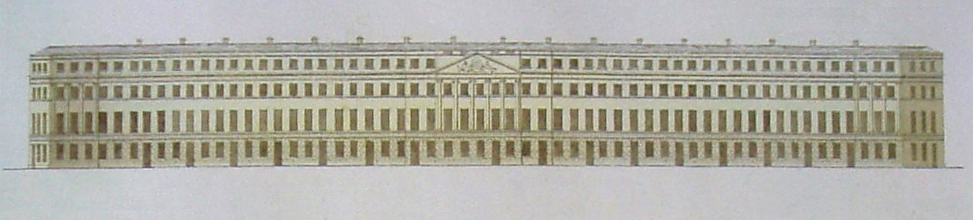
Palmer's design for the facade of Norfolk Crescent

John Palmer's plan for Norfolk Crescent had nineteen three bay houses (No. 16 Great Stanhope Street and Nos. 1–18 Norfolk Crescent) in an arc with a radius of 420 ft. As was common with late 18th-century Bath houses, the mansard roof with dormer windows was dispensed with, the facade instead stretching all the way up to the top of the houses, with a parapet above the attic windows. The two end houses were to have four Ionic pilasters on the main facade. The five central bays of the terrace were to have matching pilasters and a pediment in place of the attic windows. Nelson Place was to have a matching facade, but with a slightly longer terrace containing twenty-three houses.

=== Pinch's alterations ===
At some point in the 19th century the design was altered, probably by John Pinch. The pediment was moved to be above the attic storey, so that the attics of the central houses were not deprived of light. Palmer's plan had a carved tympanum in the pediment, but this was never made, probably due to a lack of funds. Pinch also added balconies with wrought iron railings on the piano nobile (first floor) of all the houses. The iron lamp holders over the entrances to Nos. 7 and 14 are also likely to be Pinch's work.

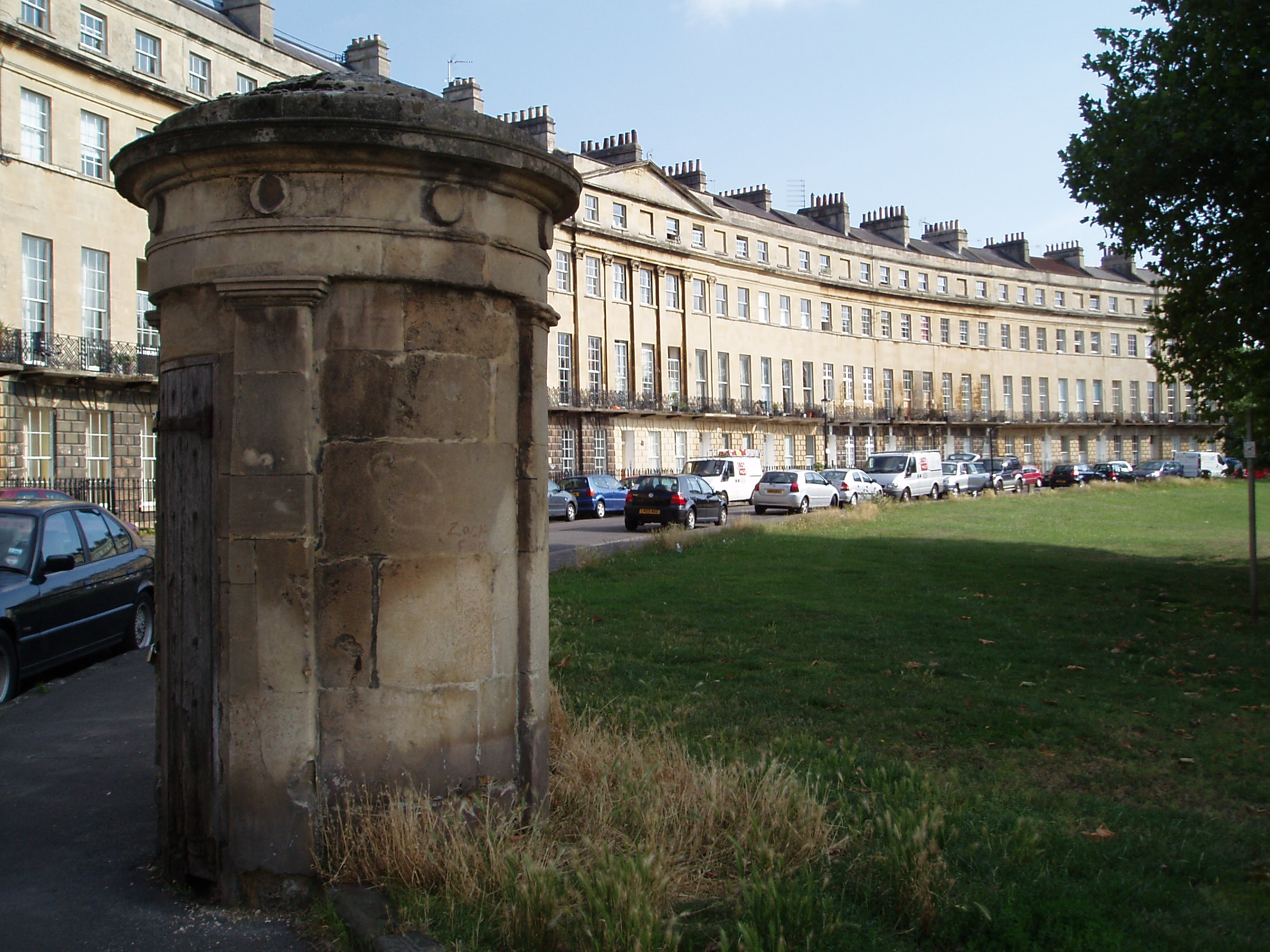
Norfolk Crescent and the watchman's box

=== Construction ===
Construction work on the houses in Norfolk Crescent (at the time still known as Norfolk Place) began in 1792 when builders first took leases on the various plots. However the building work soon stopped due to the financial crisis. When construction work started again in the 19th century the market was much slower and the houses were completed gradually, when there was money available. For instance in 1817 Nos. 1–9, No. 14 and Nos. 16–18 were complete, but the intermediate houses were still not finished. No. 11, the last house to be completed, was finished in 1822.

From the 1830s porch extensions were added on to the front of many Georgian houses in Bath, but this would have affected the visual balance of the crescent's facade, so it could not be done on Norfolk Crescent. However the owners of the two end houses (No. 16 Great Stanhope Street and No. 18 Norfolk Crescent), which had their entrances on the north and south ends of the crescent, did built full-height porch extensions on these houses without affecting the facade.

=== Bombing and reconstruction ===
In 1942 during the Second World War an incendiary bomb landed near the crescent and the north end was gutted by fire. It was not repaired until 20 years later in the 1960s, when Nos. 1–7 were rebuilt with the same facade as the original. The mid-19th-century porch extension to the end house was omitted in the reconstruction. Behind the facade, the reconstructed houses are a block of flats, not a replica of the original Georgian building.

== See also ==
- Grade I listed buildings in Bath and North East Somerset
