= Lansdown Crescent, Bath =

Row of buildings in Bath, England

Coordinates: 51°23′33″N 2°21′57″W

Lansdown Crescent
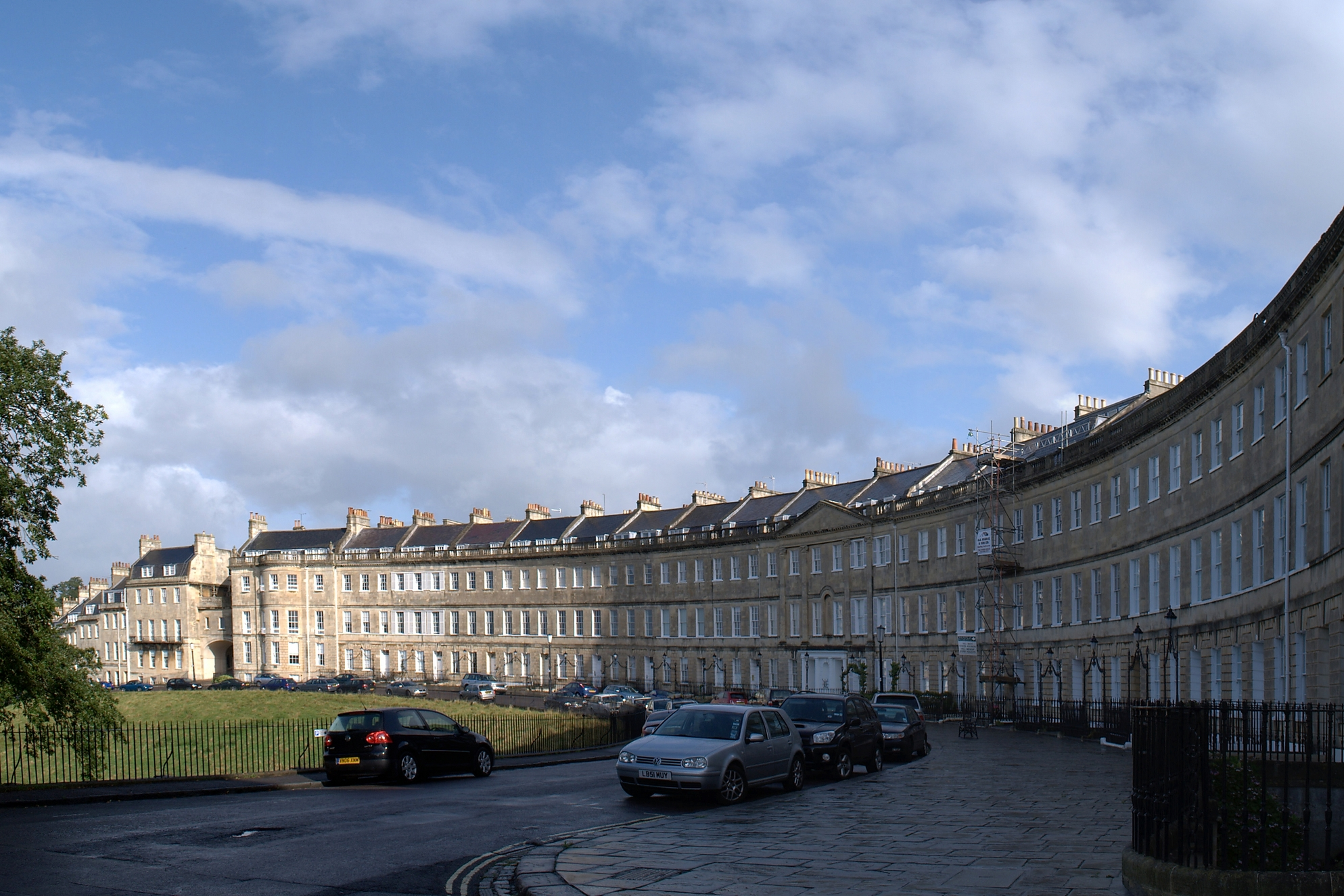
- Interactive map of the Lansdown Crescent area

General information
- Architectural style: Georgian

Listed Building – Grade I
- Official name: Nos 1-20 (Consec) And Attached Railings and Overthrows
- Designated: 12 June 1950
- Reference no.: 1394109
- Location: Bath, England
- Construction started: 1789
- Completed: 1793

Design and construction
- Architect: John Palmer

Lansdown Crescent is a well-known example of Georgian architecture in Bath, Somerset, England, designed by John Palmer and constructed by a variety of builders between 1789 and 1793. The buildings have a clear view over central Bath, being sited on Lansdown Hill near to, but higher than, other well-known Georgian buildings including the Royal Crescent, St James's Square, Bath and The Circus, Bath. It forms the central part of a string of curved terraces, including Lansdown Place East and West, and Somerset Place, which were the northernmost boundary of the development of Georgian Bath.

== History ==
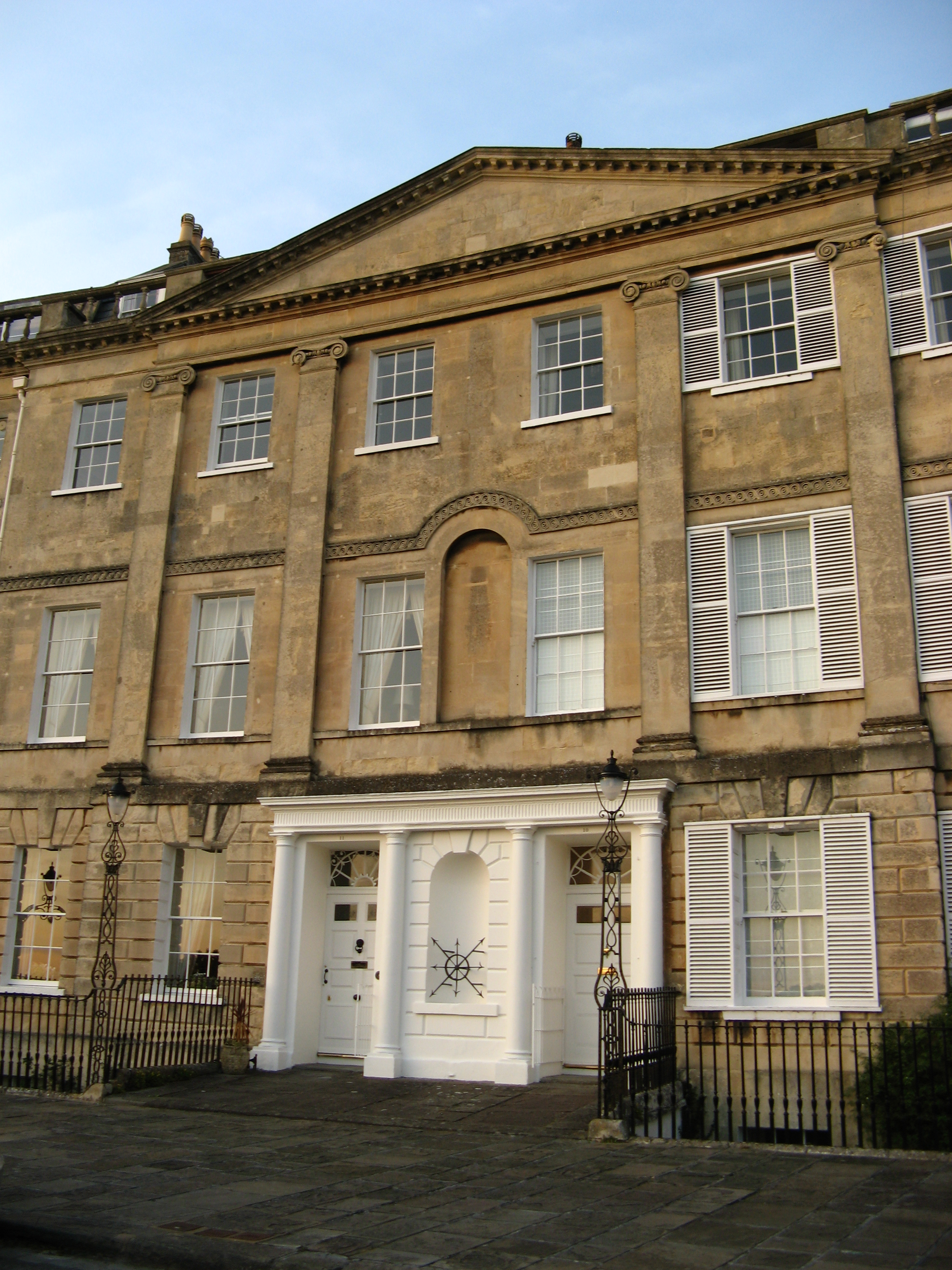
Entrances to the two central houses

The crescent was laid out by John Palmer who ensured that the three-storey fronts of the buildings were of uniform height and had matching doors and windows. The attic rooms are under a parapet and slate mansard roof. Other builders were then able to construct the houses behind the facade. The commission was from Charles Spackman, leading to the original name of the terrace being Spackman's Buildings.

During World War I the crescent was frequently painted by the artist Walter Sickert.

An unexploded bomb which had been dropped during the Bath Blitz of World War II was discovered in 2016, which required evacuation of the residents while it was made safe and then safely removed. In 2016 decorative finials from the railings in front of the houses, which had been removed and melted down during World War II were replaced after public fundraising.

The grass in front of the crescent is sometimes used to graze sheep.

== Architecture ==
The crescent, which is a grade I listed building, comprises 20 houses, each originally having four floors together with a basement and sub-basement levels below ground. Servants did not sleep in the basements. It is arranged as a concave crescent, and is flanked by Lansdown Place West and Lansdown Place East, both convex crescents and grade II listed buildings in their own right.

The two central houses, numbers 10 and 11, have a paired entrance with four Tuscan columns with a cornice and frieze above them. The central point between the windows of the first floor has a blind niche.

The archway connecting 20, Lansdown Crescent and 1, Lansdown Place West, which is a Grade I listed structure dates from William Beckford's ownership of both properties. Beckford bought the house at the west end of the Crescent in 1822 after selling Fonthill abbey. He later bought the house opposite on the corner, 20 Landsdown Crescent West, linking the two with a bridge by the architect John Lowder jnr. to form his residence. Having acquired all the land between his home and the top of Lansdown Hill, north of the city centre, he created a garden over half a mile in length and built Beckford's Tower at the top.

== Notable residents ==
- William Beckford (1760–1844), novelist
- Dick Parsons (British Army officer), (1910–1998), army marksman
- James Lees-Milne, diarist, writer, architecture scholar
- Glynis Breakwell, former Vice-Chancellor of the University of Bath
