= Crescent (architecture) =

Terraced houses arranged in a curve

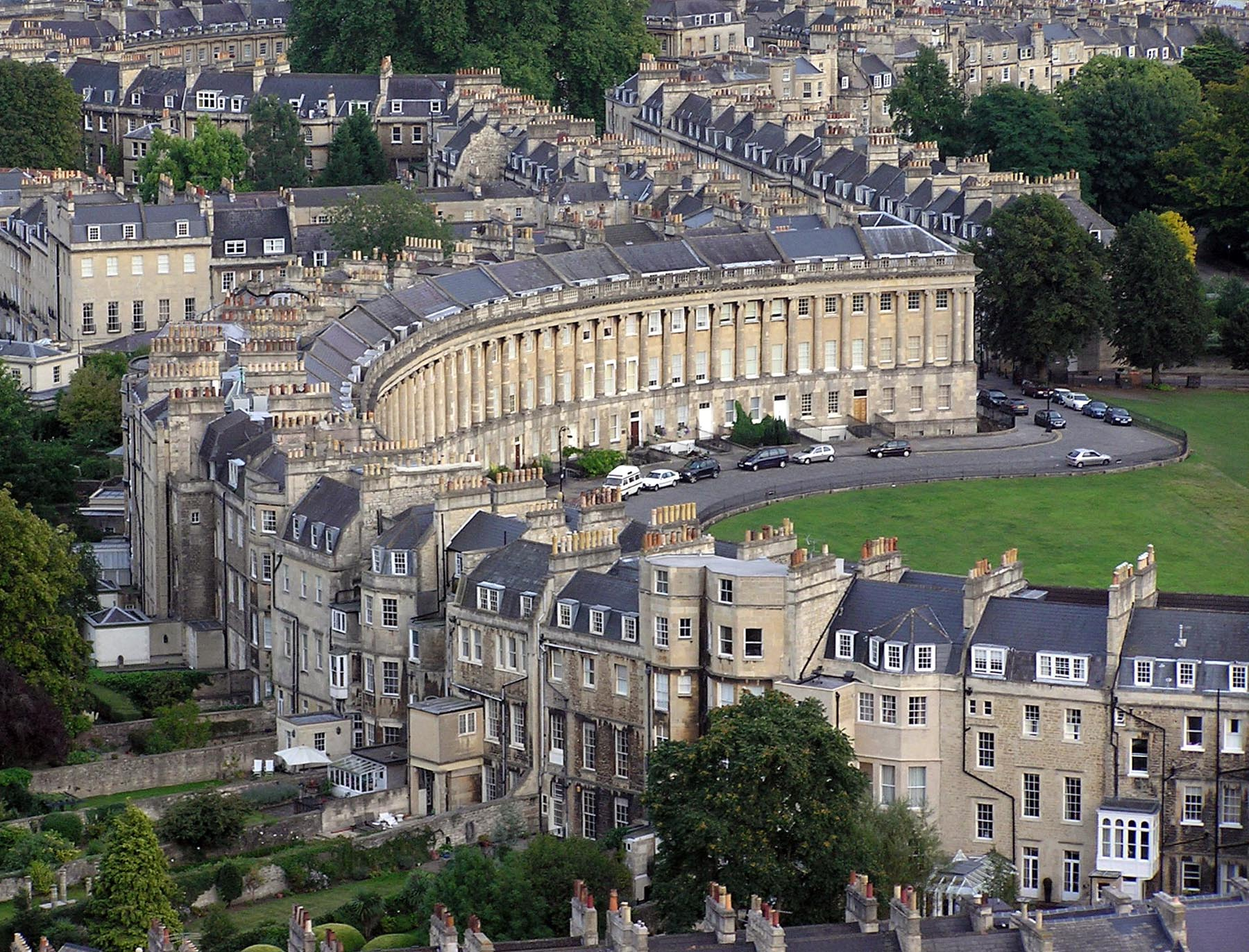
Royal Crescent, Bath

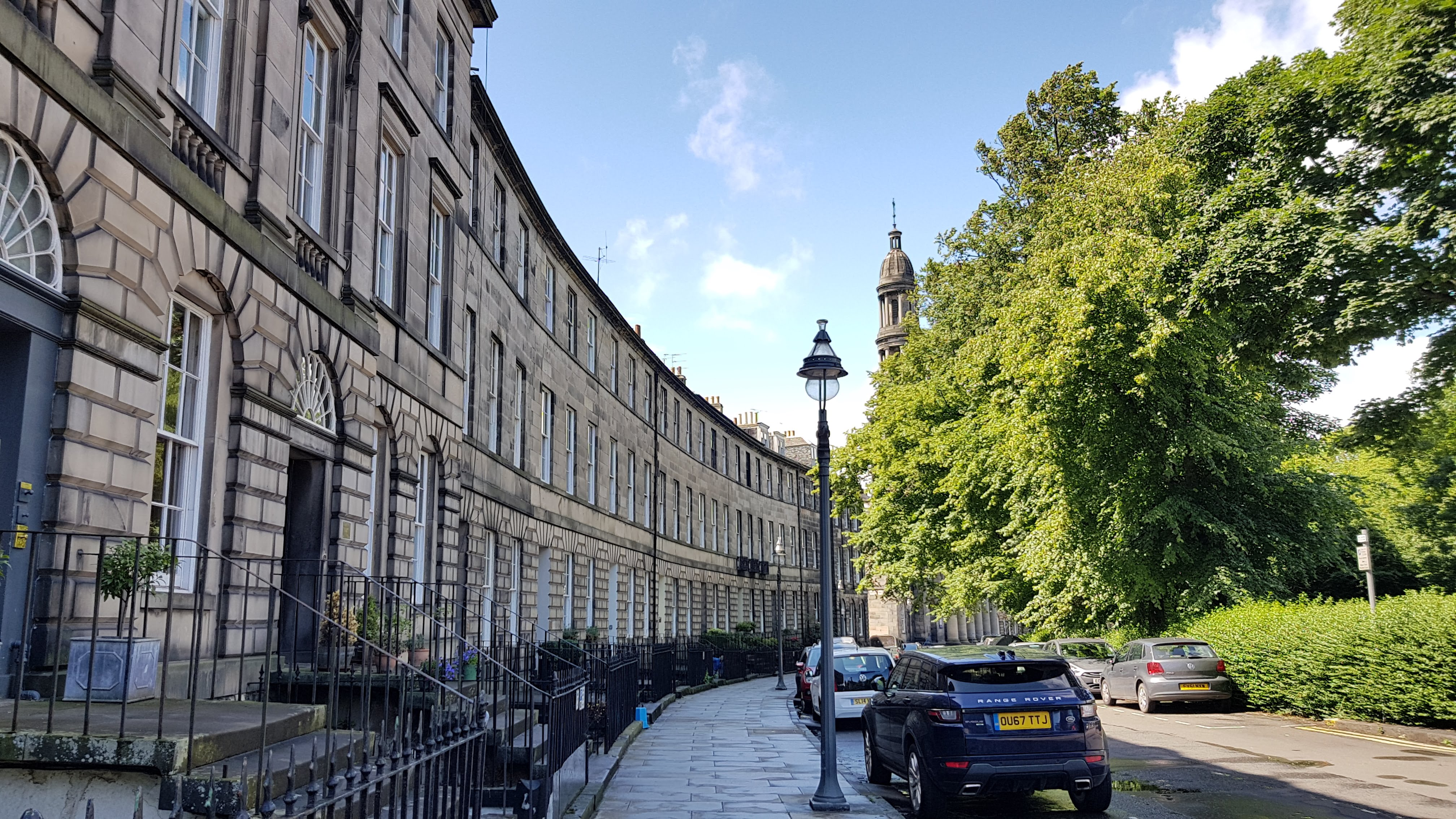
Bellevue Crescent, Edinburgh

A crescent is an architectural structure where a row of residences, typically terraced houses, are laid out in an arc to form a crescent shape. These are planned developments from end to end, some of which, such as the famous Royal Crescent in Bath and the Marino Crescent in Dublin date back to the 1700s.

== Examples ==
The following are examples of architectural crescents:

- Adelaide Crescent, Hove, England
- Bofills båge, Stockholm, Sweden, by architect Ricardo Bofill
- Buxton Crescent, Buxton, Derbyshire, England
- The Crescent, Limerick, Ireland, double Georgian style crescent
- The Crescent, Scarborough, North Yorkshire, England
- Lansdown Crescent, Bath, England
- Marino Crescent, Dublin, Ireland developed by Charles Ffolliott
- Park Circus, Glasgow, Scotland
- Park Crescent, Brighton, England
- Park Town, Oxford, England
- Plaça Manuel Malagrida, Olot, Catalonia, Spain
- Royal Crescent, Brighton, England
- Somerset Place, Bath, England
- Royal Crescent, Bath, England
- The Crescent, Wisbech, Isle of Ely, England
- Wellington Crescent, Ramsgate, England
- Tontine Crescent, Boston, Massachusetts, USA
