= John Palmer (Bath architect) =

English architect

- Born: 1738
- Died: 19 July 1817 (aged 78–79)
- Occupation: Architect

John Palmer (c. 1738 – 19 July 1817) was an English architect who worked on some of the notable buildings in the city of Bath, Somerset, UK. In 1775 Palmer produced an alternative design for Bath Corporation's new Guildhall; however they chose Thomas Baldwin's design, promoted by Thomas Warr Attwood.

Palmer is attributed with the design of arguably one of Bath's finest crescents, Lansdown with it two convex wings Lansdown Place East and Lansdown Place West. It was begun in 1785 after Charles Spackman and the banker John Lowder purchased land on which to build No1 Lansdown Crescent.

Bath's Mineral Water Hospital Governors employed Palmer to take on Baldwin's plans to expand the hospital, adding an upper story to John Wood's original design in 1793 costing £900.

Palmer succeeded Thomas Baldwin as City Architect in 1792.

He died in Bath in 1817 and is buried in St Swithin's, Walcot. A memorial to his wife Edith, daughter Edith and grand-daughter Eliza Tylee is in the upper gallery.

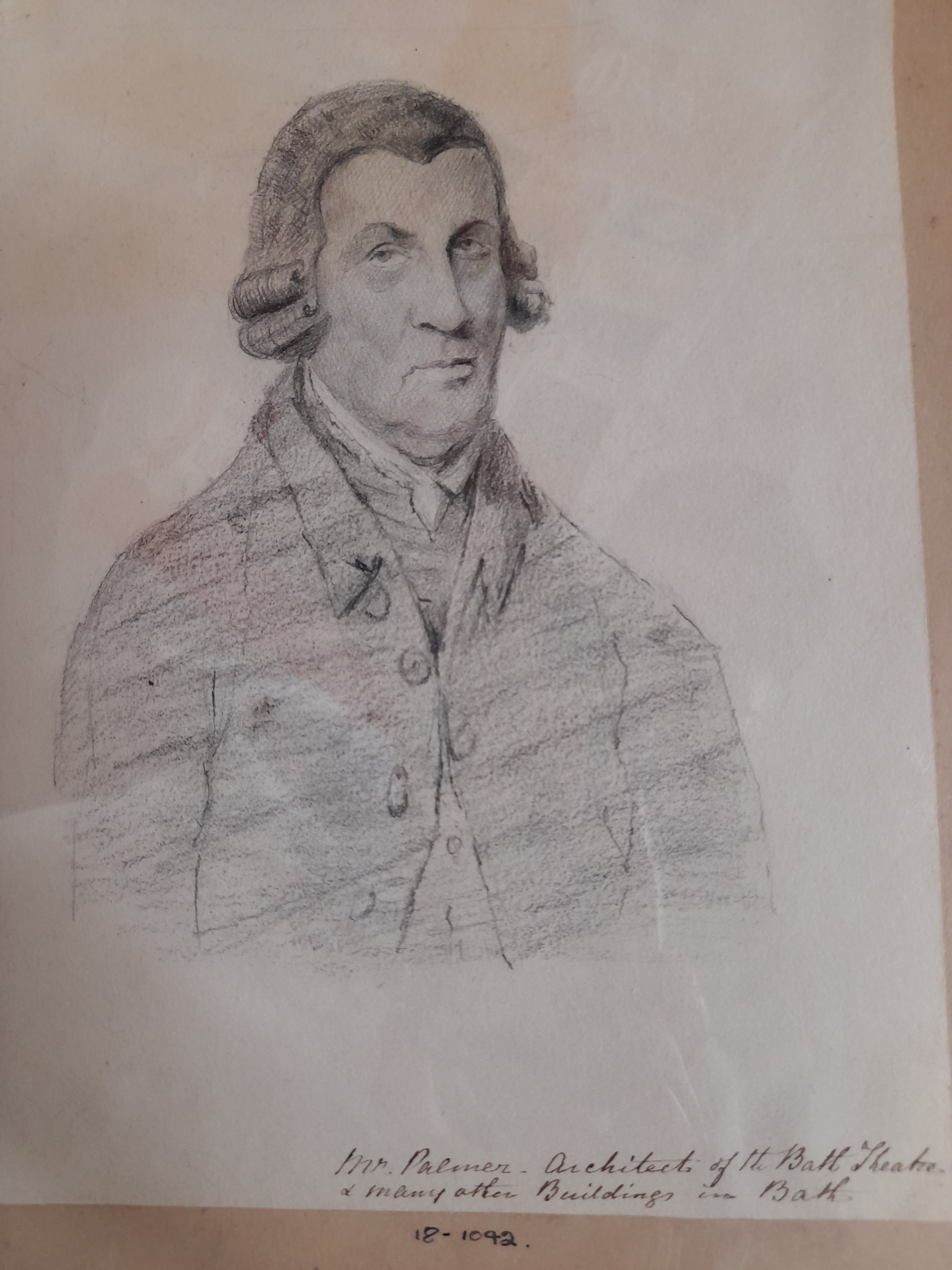
Pencil drawing of Mr John Palmer, architect of Bath.

== Some works ==
- St James' Church, Bath, on Stall Street (1768–1769, gutted by incendiary bombs in 1942 and demolished for the former Marks & Spencer building)
- St James's Parade (1768)
- Cottles House, now Stonar School, Atworth, Wiltshire (1775)
- Church of St Swithin, Bath, The Paragon, Bath (1777–1780)
- Shockerwick House, Bathford, Somerset (1785)
- Lansdown Crescent, Bath, and the adjacent Lansdown Place West and Lansdown Place East (1789-1793)
- Unitarian Chapel, Trim Street 1795.
- Cross Bath remodelled by Palmer 1797-98 to accommodate the Baths when Bath Street was created, after work by Thomas Baldwin (1789). His round plan and elevation were approved by the Bath Corporation 22 July 1797
- Grand Pump Room, Bath, begun in 1789 by Thomas Baldwin who resigned in 1791; recommenced by Palmer in 1794
- St George's Place (c.1790)
- Cumberland House, Norfolk Crescent, Bath (c. 1790–1800, continued by John Pinch after 1810)
- Park Street (1790-1793)
- 1-8, Bath Street (1791-1794)
- Nelson Place West, Bath (c. 1800–1820, continued by John Pinch after 1810)
- Stall Street, Bath (c. 1790–1800)
- St James's Square, Bath (1791–1794)
- St James's Street (1791)
- 6-9, Abbey Church Yard (1790s)
- Royal Mineral Water Hospital additions, Bath (1793)
- Kensington Chapel, London Road, Walcot, Bath. The proprietary chapel for St Swithin's Walcot built 1795. Interior no longer present.
- Kensington Place, Bath, London Road, Walcot, Bath (1795)
- 10, Abbey Church Yard (c.1795)
- Christ Church, Bath (1798)
- Theatre Royal, Bath (1804–1805), designed by George Dance the Younger and erected by Palmer
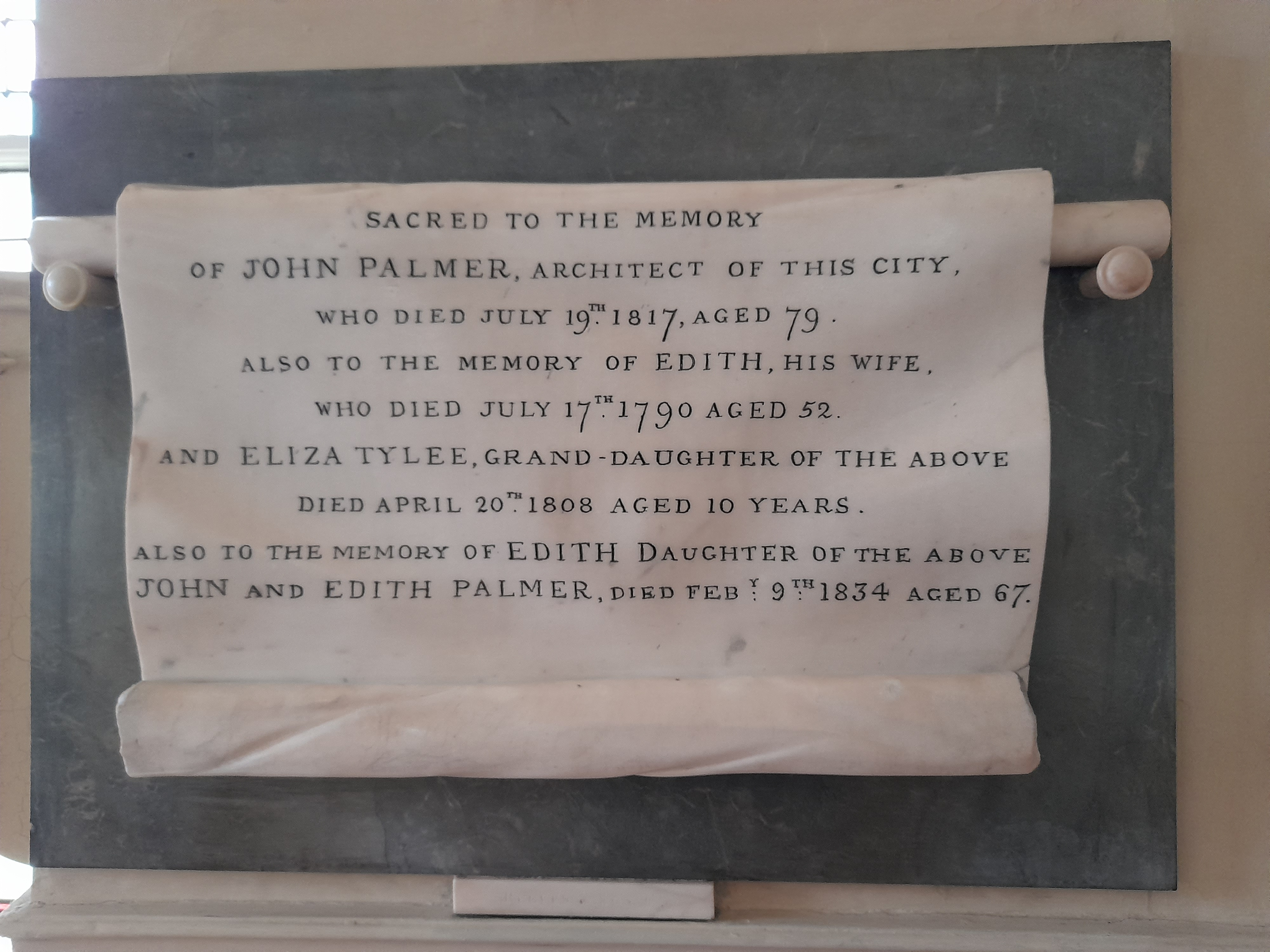
- Palmer of Bath memorial at St Swithin's
  New Bond Street, Bath (1805–1807)

| Preceded by Thomas Baldwin (architect) | Bath City Architect; 1793–1817 | Succeeded by ? |

| Preceded by Thomas Baldwin (architect) | Bath City Surveyor; 1793–1817 | Succeeded by John Lowder |
