= Lawrence Holme Twentyman =

British silversmith active in Cape Town

Lawrwnce Holme Twentyman (8 May 1783 – 8 June 1852) was a Silversmith in Cape Town, in what is now South Africa.

== Life ==
Lawrence Holme Twentyman was born in Tithebarn St., Liverpool son of John Middleton Twentyman (a Cooper and Trader) and Phoebe Holme. In 1818 he went to the Cape with his younger brother William Holme Twentyman after they inherited money from a great uncle. The brothers arrived in Cape Town on 12 June 1818 on the ‘Ann’ and Lawrence opened a shop at the corner of Wale Street and the Heerengracht (Adderley Street) in Cape Town. Lawrence was a watchmaker & silversmith, and later became a partner in Twentyman & Co with John Chrisholm in 1820 running his own shop next door to that of his brother. His first advertisement appeared in the Cape of Good Hope Government Gazette on 4 July 1818. After this he advertised regularly and offered silver watches, chronometers and jewellery for sale. Within four years Lawrence had established himself as the leading silversmith at the Cape, receiving commissions from the governor, churches and leading citizens. He made a number of presentation vases, all in the prevailing English style, and many small pieces such as snuff-boxes, christening cups, beakers and flatware of varying quality. With the aid of Malay labourers, who had learnt the art of the silversmith from their ancestors of the eighteenth century, he opened a better equipped shop at No. 30, the Heerengracht, Cape Town, and undoubtedly became the most prosperous and best known English silversmith at the Cape.

Lawrence married Elizabeth Henrietta Burrell from Liverpool on 24 May 1821 at the St George's Church, Cape Town. The brothers, like most shop-owners, lived on the premises at the back, but their business expanded to such an extent that it later comprised Numbers 28, 29 and 30 in the Heerengracht. During this period he also made clocks, of which there is a beautiful example in 'Groote Schuur', the official residence of the Prime Minister at Rondebosch. He was the first silversmith to bring Sheffield silver to the Cape and by 1830 an entire warehouse was used to store the goods. Twentyman was so prosperous that in 1829 he bought a house in the vicinity of the present Mount Nelson Hotel, owned a number of slaves, and subscribed to the fund for alleviating the misery of the slave population. When he and his family returned to England in the ‘St George’ in 1832, his brother William had already left for Mauritius, where he later made a fortune. Before the family’s departure for England he entered into partnership with George Warner to keep up the shop in the Hereengracht; for this reason not one of the pieces manufactured after 1832 and bearing the stamp 'T. and Co.' can be regarded as genuine Lawrence Twentyman. It is also uncertain whether any piece stamped T. and Co. was that of Lawrence Twentyman. because at that time a Calcutta firm used the same mark. The business continued to produce silver items until about 1837, although it is possible some of these were imported silver plate to which had been added the Twentyman stamp. Lawrence had purchased the farms Avontuur and Luipards Kloof (about 4300 ha) at Stormsvlei and these were also managed by George Warner. In London, where his brothers were in the tea trade, Lawrence became a general merchant, and since he was not a registered silversmith did not manufacture any silverware in England.

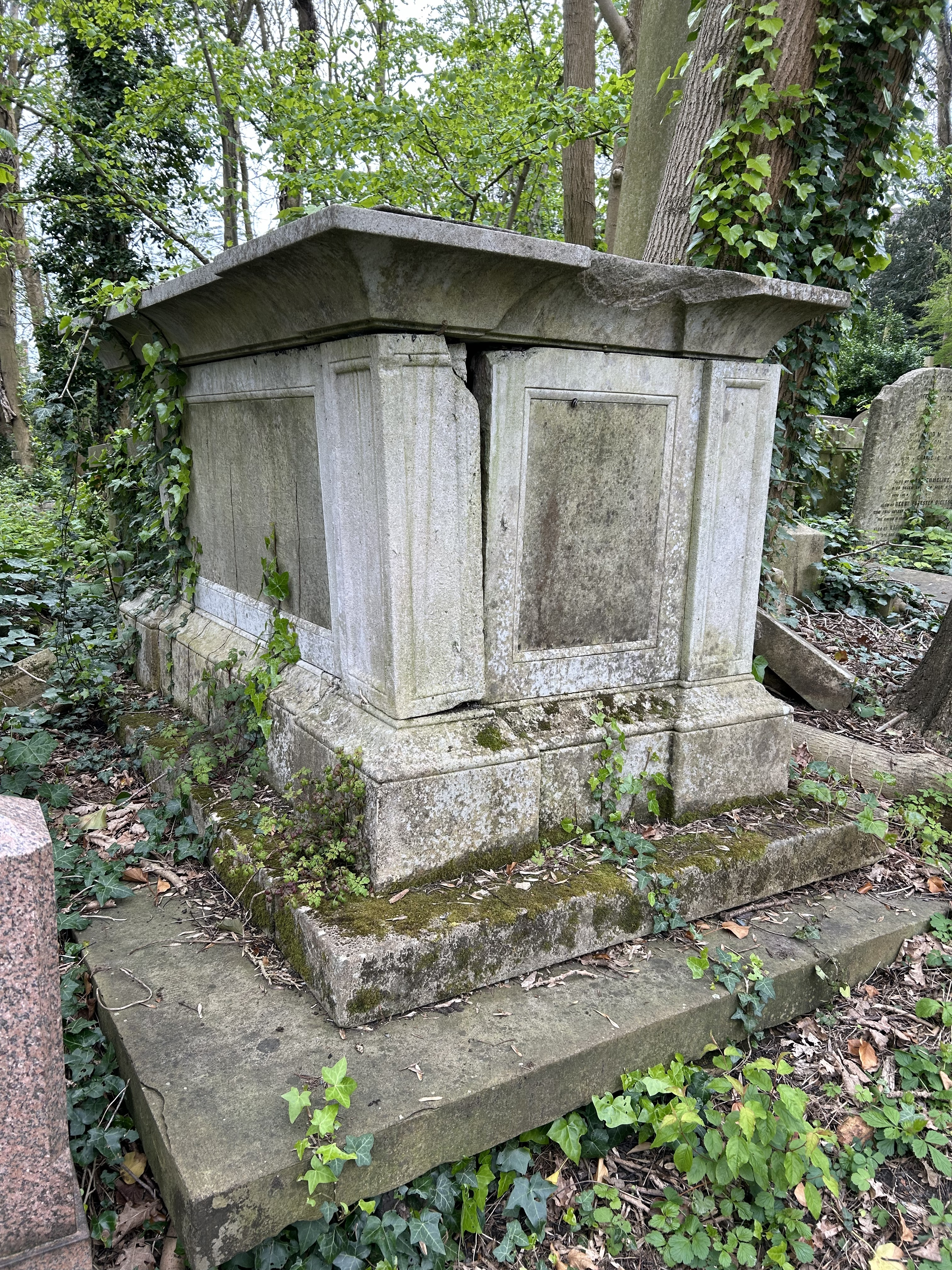
Tomb of Lawrence Twentyman in Highgate Cemetery

In 1841 Lawrence was living at 27 Avenue Road, Regent's Park, London, close to his brother at 21 Avenue Road. The family later moved to Clockhouse, (now 13, Pretoria Avenue), Walthamstow, a Grade II A Regency style detached villa, erected in 1813 and the original Walthamstow home of the Warner family.

Lawrence died on 8 June 1852 of a stomach ulcer, at his residence, Clockhouse, Walthamstow, London, and was buried in Highgate Cemetery. He was survived by his wife and six children.
