= William Holme Twentyman =

William Holme Twentyman (31 October 1802 – 7 May 1884) was a silversmith in Cape Town, who amassed a considerable fortune on Mauritius and retired at the age of 39. Whilst on Mauritius he created a sealed case for a pocket watch to be worn under water. After trials soldered lugs were incorporated and a "strong canvas" band was tied to the wrist for ease of use. Twentyman also painted the dial orange as to be more clearly seen underwater. This creation was known as the Twentyman "orange gorilla" due to its large size.

== Life ==
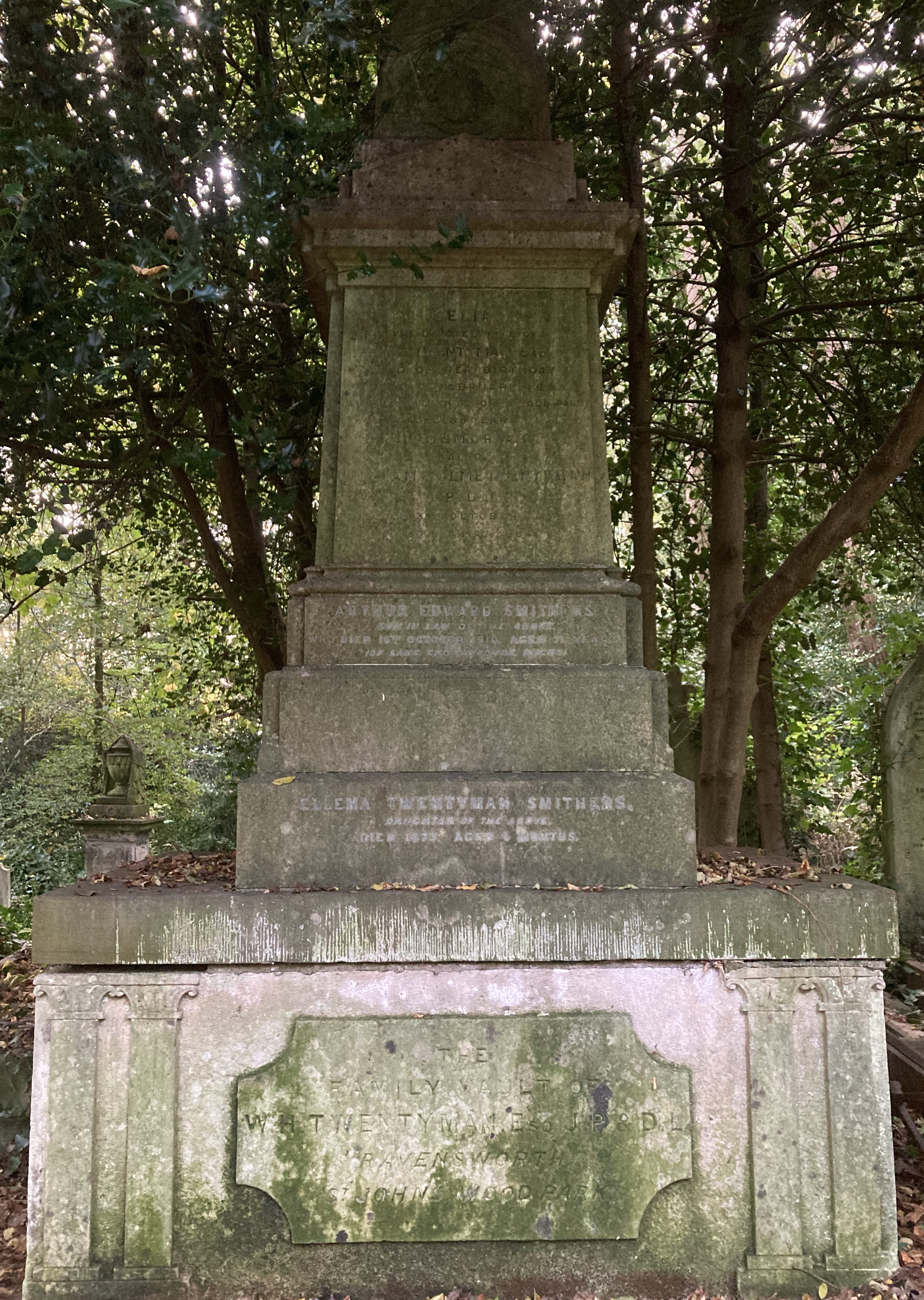
Family vault of William Holme Twentyman in Highgate Cemetery

William Holme Twentyman was born in Liverpool, the son of John Middleton Twentyman (a cooper and trader) and Phoebe Holme. In 1818 he went to the Cape with his elder brother Lawrence Holme Twentyman (a silversmith and watchmaker), after they inherited money from a great uncle. The brothers arrived in Cape Town on 12 June 1818 on the Ann. William was apprenticed to Lawrence as a silversmith and watchmaker, and later became a partner in Twentyman & Co, running his own shop next door to that of his brother.

In 1828 he moved to Mauritius, arriving on the Winscales on 19 January 1829, where he ran a business as a watch seller and jeweler in Port Louis. On 2 June 1832 at the Anglican Church of Port Louis he married Celia Pinch, daughter of John Pinch the elder an architect in Bath, Somerset. During June/July 1832 he was caught up in the slave rebellion on Mauritius with his shop coming under siege. By 1841 William had amassed a considerable fortune and, with his family, had returned to England, residing at 21 Avenue Road, Regent's Park, London.

William Twentyman was elected Special Constable in 1848; was admitted to the Freedom of the Spectacle Makers' Company by redemption on 3 June 1861; admitted to the Freedom of the City of London by redemption through the Spectacle Makers' Company on 6 June 1861; was Sheriff of the City of London from 1861 to 1862; and Justice of the Peace (JP).

He died on Wednesday 7 May 1884, at his residence, Ravensworth, St. John's Wood Park, London, and was buried in a family vault on the western side of Highgate Cemetery. William Twentyman left a personal estate of £28173-15-6d.
