= John Pinch the Elder =

Architect

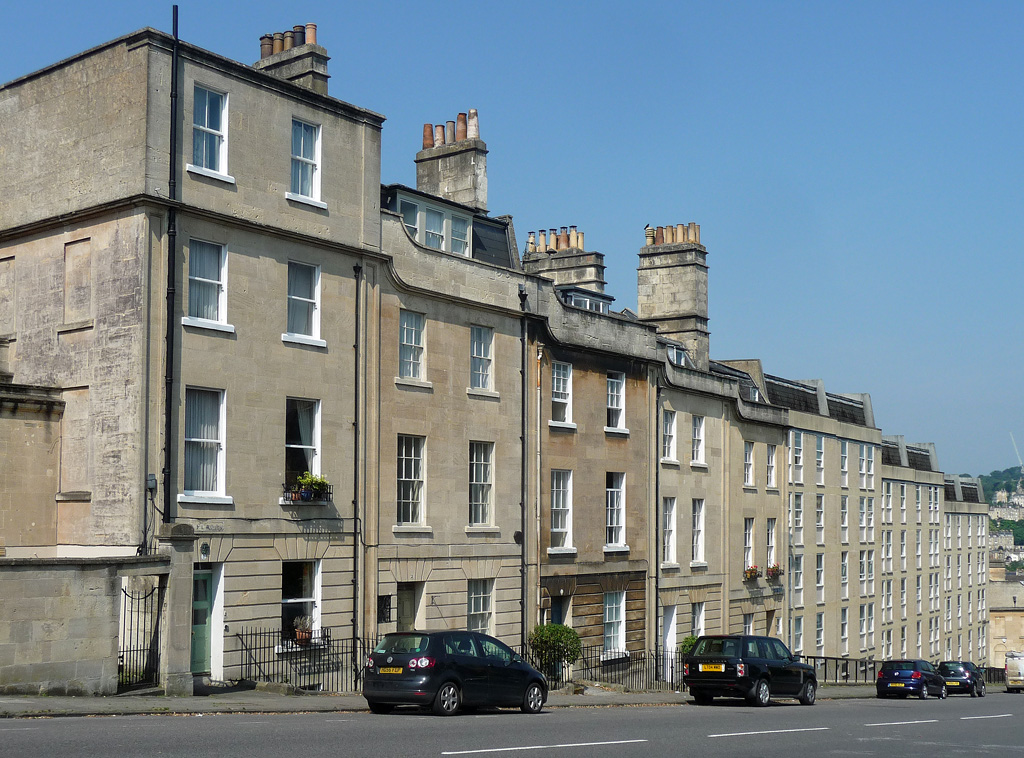
Sion Place, Bathwick (1826)

John Pinch (1769–1827) was an architect working mainly in the city of Bath, England. He was surveyor to the Pulteney and Darlington estate and responsible for many of the later Georgian buildings in Bath, especially in Bathwick.

== Biography ==
John Pinch was born at Callington, Cornwall, where he was christened on 4 January 1769. He started as an architect and builder in the 1790s. He was assistant to Thomas Baldwin as surveyor to the Pulteney estate and succeeded him as surveyor after Baldwin's bankruptcy in 1793; when the estate passed into the ownership of the Earl of Darlington he retained his position. Pinch married Martha Cleave (1772–1830) on Christmas Eve, 1792, at St Mellion, Cornwall. He died on 11 March 1827 in Bath and is buried at St Mary's Churchyard, Bathwick.

His son, John Pinch the Younger, was also an architect and surveyor to the Pulteney and Darlington Estate. His daughter, Celia Pinch, married the silversmith William Holme Twentyman on Mauritius.

== Works ==
Pinch's earliest identified work is Babington House in Babington, Somerset, which was built in 1790. A few years later he completed Northampton Street in Bath which had been started by Thomas Baldwin, and was completed by George Phillips Manners.

New commissions included Rockfield House in Nunney (1805) and various properties in Bath, including New Sydney Place (1807); and in Bathwick, Daniel Street (1810) and Raby Place (1825).

Norfolk Crescent in Bath was started around 1793 by John Palmer and continued about 1820 by Pinch. A similar completion of Palmer's designs was Nelson Place.

Pinch also has his own projects in Bath including, between 1808 and 1815, Cavendish Place, Cavendish Crescent (1817–1830), Sion Hill Place (1817–1820), Cleveland Pools (c.1814), St Mary's Church, Bathwick (1817–1820), Spa Villa, Bathwick Hill (1820), Prior Park Buildings, a terrace of 19 houses off Prior Park Road, built from 1820, St. Michael's Church, Twerton (1824) and the Royal United Hospital (now Gainsborough Hotel) in Beau Street, Bath (1824–1826).

Outside Bath he worked in Wiltshire on St Lawrence's Church in Hungerford (1814–1816), Corsley House, Corsley (1814), Bishopstrow House (1817–1821) and the mausoleum for Richard Colt Hoare at St Peter's Church in Stourton (1819). He is also tentatively credited with extensions and alterations to Babington House near Frome in around 1790.
