= 2015 Bath and North East Somerset Council election =

2015 UK local government election

← 2011	7 May 2015	2019 →

All 65 seats to Bath and North East Somerset Council 33 seats needed for a majority
	First party	Second party	Third party
	Con	LD	Lab
Leader	Tim Warren	Paul Crossley	John Bull
Party	Conservative	Liberal Democrats	Labour
Leader's seat	Mendip	Southdown	Paulton
Last election	29 seats, 36.9%	29 seats, 34.8%	5 seats, 17.9%
Seats won	37	15	6
Seat change	▲8	▼14	▲1
Popular vote	63,614	42,472	24,819
Percentage	37.5%	25.0%	14.6%
Swing	▲0.6%	▼9.8%	▼3.3%
	Fourth party	Fifth party	Sixth party
	Ind	Grn	VV
Leader	Nathan Hartley	None	None
Party	Independent	Green	Village Voice
Leader's seat	Did not stand	None	None
Last election	2 seats, 3.6%	0 seats, 6.7%	Did not contest
Seats won	3	2	2
Seat change	▲1	▲2	▲2
Popular vote	9,519	22,506	2,001
Percentage	5.6%	13.3%	1.2%
Swing	▲2.0%	▲6.6%	▲1.2%
- Map showing the composition of Bath and North East Somerset Council following the election. Blue showing Conservative, Red showing Labour, Yellow showing Liberal Democrats, Grey showing Independents, Green showing Greens and Pale Green showing Village Voice. Striped wards have mixed representation.
Council control before election
No overall control (Lib Dem minority)
Council control after election
Conservative

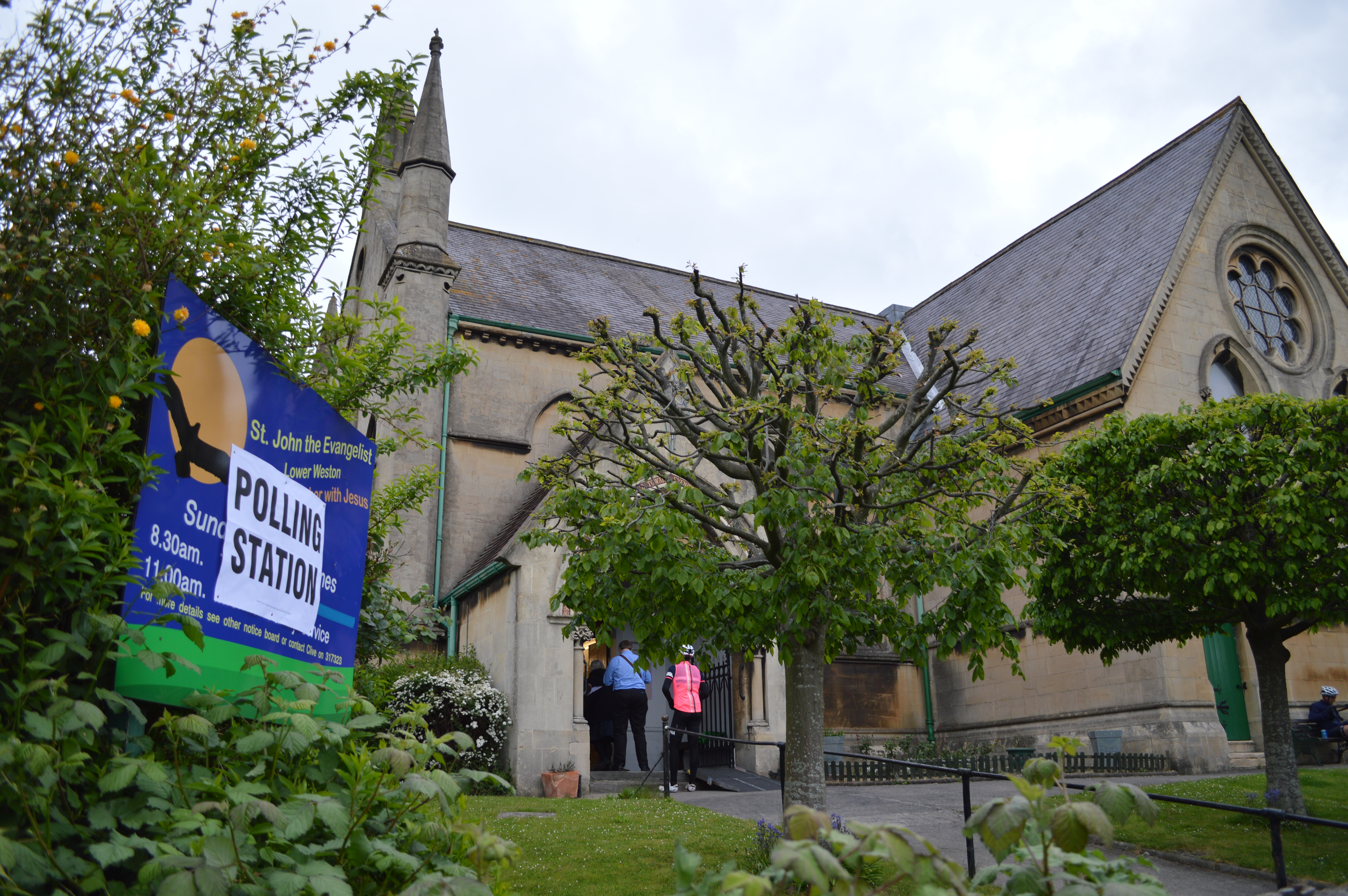
St John the Evangelist church being used as a polling station for Kingsmead ward

The 2015 Bath and North East Somerset Council election took place on 7 May 2015 to elect members of Bath and North East Somerset Council in England. This coincided with other local elections and the 2015 general election.

== Election results ==
Bath and North East Somerset Council election, 2015
Party	Candidates						Votes		
Party	Stood	Elected	Gained	Unseated	Net	% of total	%	No.	Net %
Conservative	65	37	11	3	▲8	56.9%	37.5%	63,614	▲0.6%
Liberal Democrats	65	15	2	16	▼14	23.1%	25.0%	42,472	▼9.8%
Labour	44	6	1	0	▲1	9.2%	14.6%	24,819	▼3.3%
Independent	20	3	1	0	▲1	4.6%	5.6%	9,519	▲2%
Green	43	2	2	0	▲2	3.1%	13.3%	22,506	▲6.6%
Village Voice	2	2	2	0	▲2	3.1%	1.2%	2,001	N/A
UKIP	12	0	0	0	Steady	0%	2.8%	4,719	▲2.7%
Left Unity	2	0	0	0	Steady	0%	0.0%	53	N/A

== Ward results ==
The ward results listed below are based on the changes from the 2011 elections, not taking into account any party defections or by-elections. Sitting councillors are marked with an asterisk (*).

=== Abbey ===
Abbey (2 seats)
Party	Candidate	Votes	%	±%
Conservative	Peter Turner	1,158	30.4	–1.5
Green	Jonathan Carr	1,071	28.1	+8.7
Conservative	Brian Webber *	985	–	
Liberal Democrats	Louise Bray	798	20.9	–13.5
Liberal Democrats	Manda Rigby *	741	–	
Labour	Laurel Casserley	639	16.8	+2.4
Independent	Jenny Knight	148	3.9	N/A
Turnout				
Registered electors				
Conservative hold		Swing		
Green gain from Liberal Democrats		Swing		

=== Bathavon North ===
Bathavon North (3 seats)
Party	Candidate	Votes	%	±%
Conservative	Martin Veal *	1,971	37.4	+0.2
Conservative	Geoff Ward *	1,745	–	
Liberal Democrats	Alison Millar	1,544	29.3	–3.1
Conservative	Ian Cooper	1,501	–	
Liberal Democrats	Vito Pecchia	1,305	–	
Liberal Democrats	Dorian Baker	1,286	–	
Green	Justin Temblett-Wood	786	15.0	–
Labour	Hendrik Bebber	673	12.8	–2.7
Labour	Andrew Pottage	406	–	
Labour	Alex Jovcic-Sas	394	–	
UKIP	Dan Evans	288	5.5	N/A
Turnout				
Registered electors				
Conservative hold		Swing		
Conservative hold		Swing		
Liberal Democrats gain from Conservative		Swing		

=== Bathavon South ===
Bathavon South
Party	Candidate	Votes	%	±%
Liberal Democrats	Neil Butters *	860	47.6	–1.7
Conservative	Johnny Kidney	644	35.7	+1.0
Green	Hugh Prentice	177	9.8	+2.2
Labour	Jordan Ness	125	6.9	–1.5
Majority		216	12.0	
Turnout		1,806		
Registered electors				
Liberal Democrats hold		Swing		

=== Bathavon West ===
Bathavon West
Party	Candidate	Votes	%	±%
Conservative	David Veale *	712	46.3	–6.7
Liberal Democrats	William Hobhouse	388	25.2	–21.8
Green	George Oram	328	21.3	N/A
Independent	Marilyn Deacon	110	7.2	N/A
Majority		324	21.1	
Turnout		1,538		
Registered electors				
Conservative hold		Swing		

=== Bathwick ===
Bathwick (2 seats)
Party	Candidate	Votes	%	±%
Conservative	Matt Cochrane	1,121	38.8	+5.3
Conservative	Steve Jeffries	966	–	
Liberal Democrats	Claire Jackson	826	28.6	–18.4
Liberal Democrats	David Martin *	797	–	
Green	Matt Benka	584	20.2	+10.4
Labour	Saiful Islam	357	12.4	+2.7
Labour	Samuel Marlow-Stevens	287	–	
Turnout				
Registered electors				
Conservative gain from Liberal Democrats		Swing		
Conservative gain from Liberal Democrats		Swing		

=== Chew Valley North ===
Chew Valley North
Party	Candidate	Votes	%	±%
Conservative	Liz Richardson *	969	62.2	–11.6
Liberal Democrats	Charles Fenn	305	19.6	+6.2
Green	Laurence Guy	284	18.2	N/A
Majority		664	42.6	
Turnout		1,558		
Registered electors				
Conservative hold		Swing		

=== Chew Valley South ===
Chew Valley South
Party	Candidate	Votes	%	±%
Conservative	Vic Pritchard *	1,071	67.2	+15.0
Green	Sally Calverley	321	20.1	N/A
Liberal Democrats	Gitte Dawson	202	12.7	–5.1
Majority		750	47.1	
Turnout		1,594		
Registered electors				
Conservative hold		Swing		

=== Clutton ===
Clutton
Party	Candidate	Votes	%	±%
Conservative	Karen Warrington	736	46.3	–1.1
Liberal Democrats	Jeremy Sparks *	540	34.0	–18.6
Labour	Neil Dowman	183	11.5	N/A
Green	Michael Edwards	131	8.2	N/A
Majority		196	12.3	
Turnout		1,590		
Registered electors				
Conservative gain from Liberal Democrats		Swing		

=== Combe Down ===
Combe Down (2 seats)
Party	Candidate	Votes	%	±%
Liberal Democrats	Cherry Beath *	1,247	34.3	–11.9
Conservative	Bob Goodman	1,006	27.7	+2.8
Conservative	David Beaugeard	964	–	
Liberal Democrats	Joel Hirst	743	–	
Green	Rosie Jones	729	20.1	+6.2
Labour	Sanjeev Chaddha	396	10.9	–1.5
UKIP	Michael Stanley	256	7.0	N/A
Turnout				
Registered electors				
Liberal Democrats hold		Swing		
Conservative gain from Liberal Democrats		Swing		

=== Farmborough ===
Farmborough
Party	Candidate	Votes	%	±%
Conservative	Sally Davis *	1,191	74.4	+2.6
Liberal Democrats	Nicole Sykes	409	25.6	+6.6
Majority		782	48.9	
Turnout		1,600		
Registered electors				
Conservative hold		Swing		

=== High Littleton ===
High Littleton
Party	Candidate	Votes	%	±%
Conservative	Les Kew *	1,102	63.2	+1.5
Green	Sarah Huggins	358	20.5	N/A
Liberal Democrats	Andy Stewart	284	16.3	+3.6
Majority		744	42.7	
Turnout		1,744		
Registered electors				
Conservative hold		Swing		

=== Keynsham East ===
Keynsham East (2 seats)
Party	Candidate	Votes	%	±%
Conservative	Marie Longstaff *	1,858	49.6	–2.9
Conservative	Bryan Organ *	1,802	–	
Liberal Democrats	Andy Wait	854	22.8	–2.1
Liberal Democrats	Keith Kirwan	583	–	
Labour	Keith Burchell	555	14.8	–7.8
Labour	Jonathan Wallcroft	543	–	
Green	Sam Willitts	477	12.7	N/A
Turnout				
Registered electors				
Conservative hold		Swing		
Conservative hold		Swing		

=== Keynsham North ===
Keynsham North (2 seats)
Party	Candidate	Votes	%	±%
Conservative	Charles Gerrish *	1,443	46.8	–10.1
Conservative	Brian Simmons *	1,203	–	
Labour	Christopher Davis	609	19.8	–6.6
Labour	Elizabeth King	570	–	
UKIP	Steve Grimes	437	14.2	N/A
Green	Justin Edwards	423	13.7	N/A
Liberal Democrats	Joshua Little	171	5.5	–11.2
Liberal Democrats	Thomas Pirie	108	–	
Turnout				
Registered electors				
Conservative hold		Swing		
Conservative hold		Swing		

=== Keynsham South ===
Keynsham South (2 seats)
Party	Candidate	Votes	%	±%
Conservative	Alan Hale *	1,213	40.3	–4.5
Conservative	Lisa O'Brien	913	–	
Labour	Tony Crouch	827	27.5	–5.1
Labour	Fflyff McLaren	483	–	
UKIP	Philip Evans	444	14.7	N/A
Liberal Democrats	Karen Godfrey	284	9.4	–13.2
Green	Matt Orton	244	8.1	N/A
Liberal Democrats	Linda Hawes	184	–	
Turnout				
Registered electors				
Conservative hold		Swing		
Conservative hold		Swing		

=== Kingsmead ===
Kingsmead (2 seats)
Party	Candidate	Votes	%	±%
Liberal Democrats	Andrew Furse *	967	31.2	–8.8
Conservative	Chris Pearce	872	28.1	+7.8
Green	Eric Lucas	696	22.4	+2.6
Conservative	Benedict Spencer	680	–	
Green	Dick Daniel	625	–	
Liberal Democrats	Douglas Nicol *	624	–	
Labour	Pam Richards	404	13.0	–2.9
UKIP	Andrew Bosanquet	163	5.3	+1.2
Turnout				
Registered electors				
Liberal Democrats hold		Swing		
Conservative gain from Liberal Democrats		Swing		

=== Lambridge ===
Lambridge (2 seats)
Party	Candidate	Votes	%	±%
Green	Lin Patterson	984	25.3	+3.2
Liberal Democrats	Rob Appleyard *	900	23.2	+0.2
Conservative	Ian Cowie	874	22.5	–9.9
Liberal Democrats	Y Kumar	619	–	
Independent	Dave Laming *	597	15.4	N/A
Conservative	Tor Soltvedt	541	–	
Independent	Bryan Chalker *	539	–	N/A
Labour	Vicky Drew	531	13.7	–9.3
Labour	Ron Laden	351	–	
Turnout				
Registered electors				
Green gain from Conservative		Swing		
Liberal Democrats gain from Conservative		Swing		

=== Lansdown ===
Lansdown (2 seats)
Party	Candidate	Votes	%	±%
Conservative	Patrick Anketell-Jones *	1,366	49.2	+1.2
Conservative	Tony Clarke *	1,185	–	
Green	Sally Harris	594	21.4	+3.6
Green	Eleanor Field	537	–	
Liberal Democrats	Felicity Gibson-Watt	504	18.1	+0.3
Liberal Democrats	Dylan Hughes	425	–	
Labour	Hilary Fraser	313	11.3	–2.3
Turnout				
Registered electors				
Conservative hold		Swing		
Conservative hold		Swing		

=== Lyncombe ===
Lyncombe (2 seats)
Party	Candidate	Votes	%	±%
Conservative	Mark Shelford	1,165	30.7	+3.5
Conservative	Michael Norton	1,096	–	
Liberal Democrats	Katie Hall *	1,069	28.2	–15.6
Green	Tony Ambrose	930	24.5	+7.9
Liberal Democrats	Jay Risbridger	922	–	
Green	Don Grimes	766	–	
Labour	Nicky Stubbs	384	10.1	–2.3
UKIP	Hugo Jenks	246	6.5	N/A
Turnout				
Registered electors				
Conservative gain from Liberal Democrats		Swing		
Conservative gain from Liberal Democrats		Swing		

=== Mendip ===
Mendip
Party	Candidate	Votes	%	±%
Conservative	Tim Warren *	1,034	63.8	+6.1
Green	Mike Jay	344	21.2	+8.4
Liberal Democrats	Benjamin Goldstrom	242	14.9	+3.6
Majority		690	42.6	
Turnout		1,620		
Registered electors				
Conservative hold		Swing		

=== Midsomer Norton North ===
Midsomer Norton North (2 seats)
Party	Candidate	Votes	%	±%
Conservative	Michael Evans *	1,494	45.6	–2.0
Conservative	Barry Macrae *	1,385	–	
Labour	Martine Duggan	944	28.8	–7.6
Labour	Ryan Maher	769	–	
Green	Joshua Palmer	425	13.0	N/A
Liberal Democrats	Diane Bodle	262	8.0	–8.0
Liberal Democrats	James Clarke	200	–	
Independent	Mandy Clarke	153	4.7	N/A
Independent	Tex Clarke	106	–	
Turnout				
Registered electors				
Conservative hold		Swing		
Conservative hold		Swing		

=== Midsomer Norton Redfield ===
Midsomer Norton Redfield (2 seats)
Party	Candidate	Votes	%	±%
Conservative	Paul Myers *	1,633	47.7	–7.3
Conservative	Chris Watt *	1,410	–	
Labour	Liz Derl-Davis	888	25.9	–9.5
Green	Vicki Gait	593	17.3	N/A
Liberal Democrats	Michael Jakins	311	9.1	–0.5
Liberal Democrats	Alan Feest	229	–	
Turnout				
Registered electors				
Conservative hold		Swing		
Conservative hold		Swing		

=== Newbridge ===
Newbridge (2 seats)
Party	Candidate	Votes	%	±%
Conservative	Donal Hassett	1,099	27.2	+1.7
Liberal Democrats	Caroline Roberts *	1,008	25.0	–18.7
Conservative	Guy Palmer	960	–	
Liberal Democrats	Michelle O'Doherty	914	–	
Green	Antony Dobson	766	19.0	+6.2
Independent	Loraine Morgan-Brinkhurst *	603	14.9	N/A
Labour	Michelle Young	564	14.0	–4.0
Turnout				
Registered electors				
Conservative gain from Liberal Democrats		Swing		
Liberal Democrats hold		Swing		

=== Odd Down ===
Odd Down (2 seats)
Party	Candidate	Votes	%	±%
Liberal Democrats	Steve Hedges *	1,269	37.6	–10.4
Liberal Democrats	Nigel Roberts *	885	–	
Conservative	Joel Harper	711	21.1	+3.3
Conservative	Lance Payton	589	–	
Green	Karen Robinson	532	15.8	–0.4
Labour	Liz Vincent	480	14.2	–3.8
Green	Marie-Louise Jensen	421	–	
UKIP	Joska Vincent	380	11.3	N/A
Turnout				
Registered electors				
Liberal Democrats hold		Swing		
Liberal Democrats hold		Swing		

=== Oldfield ===
Oldfield (2 seats)
Party	Candidate	Votes	%	±%
Liberal Democrats	Will Sandry *	1,091	33.7	–9.7
Liberal Democrats	Shaun McGall	930	–	
Green	Jamie Smith	810	25.0	+6.5
Conservative	Chris Goodenough	769	23.7	+6.6
Conservative	Thomas Hobson	677	–	
Labour	Rachel Willis	568	17.5	–3.6
Labour	Peter Marsh	491	–	
Turnout				
Registered electors				
Liberal Democrats hold		Swing		
Liberal Democrats hold		Swing		

=== Paulton ===
Paulton (2 seats)
Party	Candidate	Votes	%	±%
Labour	Liz Hardman *	1,170	32.0	–13.3
Labour	John Bull *	861	–	
Conservative	Mike Colliver	844	23.1	–12.4
Independent	Paul Bailes	673	18.4	N/A
UKIP	Jeff Humphries	589	16.1	N/A
Conservative	Kate Simmons *	530	–	
Green	Rory Lee	235	6.4	N/A
Liberal Democrats	Charlotte Lightowler	140	3.8	–15.4
Liberal Democrats	Stephen Dawson	110	–	
Turnout				
Registered electors				
Labour hold		Swing		
Labour hold		Swing		

=== Peasedown ===
Peasedown (2 seats)
Party	Candidate	Votes	%	±%
Village Voice	Sarah Bevan *	1,095	27.0	N/A
Village Voice	Karen Walker	906	–	N/A
Conservative	Jo Davis	880	21.7	+9.3
Labour	Jonathan Rich	879	21.7	+5.0
Conservative	Stephen Goodwin	668	–	
Labour	Lesley Mansell	634	–	
Liberal Democrats	Wera Hobhouse	463	11.4	–42.8
Independent	Kathy Thomas	453	11.2	N/A
Liberal Democrats	Ray Love	304	–	
Green	Louis Williams	283	7.0	N/A
Turnout				
Registered electors				
Village Voice gain from Liberal Democrats		Swing		
Village Voice gain from Liberal Democrats		Swing		

=== Publow and Whitchurch ===
Publow and Whitchurch
Party	Candidate	Votes	%	±%
Conservative	Paul May	979	66.4	–5.7
Green	Christine Brown	285	19.3	N/A
Liberal Democrats	Dick Beath	210	14.2	+6.9
Majority		694	47.1	
Turnout		1,474		
Registered electors				
Conservative hold		Swing		

=== Radstock ===
Radstock (2 seats)
Party	Candidate	Votes	%	±%
Labour Co-op	Chris Dando	865	30.0	–9.3
Conservative	Deirdre Horstmann	643	22.3	+5.8
Conservative	Tony Heaford	637	–	
Labour Co-op	Anne Jovcic-Sas	634	–	
Liberal Democrats	Nettie Williams	593	20.6	–23.6
Liberal Democrats	Bruce Shearn	558	–	
Green	Terry Pitt	402	13.9	N/A
Independent	Gael Doswell	380	13.2	N/A
Independent	Rob Langley	327	–	
Turnout				
Registered electors				
Labour Co-op hold		Swing		
Conservative gain from Liberal Democrats		Swing		

=== Saltford ===
Saltford (2 seats)
Party	Candidate	Votes	%	±%
Conservative	Francine Haeberling *	1,262	40.0	–4.5
Conservative	Emma Dixon	1,222	–	
Liberal Democrats	Duncan Hounsell	850	26.9	+13.9
Liberal Democrats	Farida Wilson	514	–	
Green	Liz Barling	358	11.3	N/A
UKIP	Tim House	355	11.2	N/A
Labour	Nik Sas	332	10.5	–3.5
Turnout				
Registered electors				
Conservative hold		Swing		
Conservative hold		Swing		

=== Southdown ===
Southdown (2 seats)
Party	Candidate	Votes	%	±%
Liberal Democrats	Paul Crossley *	1,230	36.0	–9.3
Liberal Democrats	Dine Romero *	1,003	–	
Conservative	Peter Goodhart	797	23.3	+6.3
Conservative	Scarlett Windmill-Last	477	–	
UKIP	Julian Deverell	471	13.8	N/A
Labour	Stephen Bendle	428	12.5	–8.6
Green	Ross Baxter	407	11.9	–4.7
Green	Grant Davis	376	–	
Independent	Bethany Tavener	55	1.6	N/A
Left Unity	Karen Weston	27	0.8	N/A
Left Unity	Stewart Weston	26	–	
Turnout				
Registered electors				
Liberal Democrats hold		Swing		
Liberal Democrats hold		Swing		

=== Timsbury ===
Timsbury
Party	Candidate	Votes	%	±%
Independent	Douglas Deacon *	736	45.9	–23.0
Conservative	Carole Fitzpatrick	359	22.4	+10.4
Labour Co-op	Peter Sas	200	12.5	–3.0
Liberal Democrats	Daniel Hilton	174	10.9	+7.0
Green	Sara Strawson	134	8.4	N/A
Majority		377	23.5	
Turnout		1,603		
Registered electors				
Independent hold		Swing		

=== Twerton ===
Twerton (2 seats)
Party	Candidate	Votes	%	±%
Liberal Democrats	Tim Ball *	881	33.6	–20.7
Labour	Joe Rayment	567	21.6	+3.4
Liberal Democrats	Gerry Curran *	546	–	
Green	Lee Giles	484	18.5	+7.7
Conservative	James Hopkins	350	13.3	–3.5
UKIP	Henry Marshall	341	13.0	N/A
Conservative	Matteo Weeks	239	–	
Turnout				
Registered electors				
Liberal Democrats hold		Swing		
Labour gain from Liberal Democrats		Swing		

=== Walcot ===
Walcot (2 seats)
Party	Candidate	Votes	%	±%
Liberal Democrats	Lisa Brett *	1,323	37.4	–1.3
Conservative	Fiona Darey	795	22.5	+7.0
Green	Michael Tichelar	772	21.8	–3.7
Liberal Democrats	Tom Williams	768	–	
Green	Vipul Patel	765	–	
Conservative	Christopher Slack	695	–	
Labour	Ben Draper	516	14.6	–5.7
Labour	Tom Carter	492	–	
Independent	Susan Traill	132	3.7	N/A
Turnout				
Registered electors				
Liberal Democrats hold		Swing		
Conservative gain from Liberal Democrats		Swing		

=== Westfield ===
Westfield (2 seats)
Party	Candidate	Votes	%	±%
Labour	Eleanor Jackson *	1,100	28.5	–22.6
Labour	Robin Moss *	997	–	
UKIP	Ernie Blaber	749	19.4	N/A
Independent	Geoff Fuller	738	19.1	N/A
Conservative	Margaret Brewer	712	18.4	+3.1
Conservative	Peter Edwards	594	–	
Green	Darren Rogers	284	7.3	N/A
Liberal Democrats	Michelle Drew	281	7.3	+0.8
Liberal Democrats	Katie Mallia	133	–	
Turnout				
Registered electors				
Labour hold		Swing		
Labour hold		Swing		

=== Westmoreland ===
Westmoreland (2 seats)
Party	Candidate	Votes	%	±%
Independent	June Player *	1,577	36.4	+7.5
Independent	Colin Blackburn	947	21.9	N/A
Green	Jon Lucas	935	21.6	+3.8
Liberal Democrats	Sharon Ball *	718	16.6	–11.5
Labour	Rebecca Shields	590	13.6	–1.0
Conservative	Christopher Laycock	508	11.7	–1.1
Conservative	Steve Thomas	471	–	
Liberal Democrats	Sarah Moore	436	–	
Turnout				
Registered electors				
Independent hold		Swing		
Independent gain from Liberal Democrats		Swing		

=== Weston ===
Weston (2 seats)
Party	Candidate	Votes	%	±%
Conservative	Colin Barrett *	1,289	33.1	–14.1
Conservative	Matthew Davies	952	–	
Independent	Malcolm Lees *	811	20.8	N/A
Liberal Democrats	Ruth Malloy	737	18.9	–1.9
Green	Lisa Loveridge	627	16.1	+0.8
Liberal Democrats	Matthew White	548	–	
Labour	Steve Richards	433	11.1	–5.6
Independent	Josh Hawker	351	–	
Turnout				
Registered electors				
Conservative hold		Swing		
Conservative hold		Swing		

=== Widcombe ===
Widcombe (2 seats)
Party	Candidate	Votes	%	±%
Liberal Democrats	Ian Gilchrist *	1,067	32.1	–12.0
Conservative	Jasper Becker	1,030	31.0	–6.6
Conservative	Brook Whelan	863	–	
Liberal Democrats	Ben Stevens *	811	–	
Green	Sally Driver	699	21.1	+2.8
Green	Thelma Grimes	524	–	
Labour	Bernard Morgan	387	11.7	–1.5
Independent	Casey Nolan	137	4.1	N/A
Independent	Joy Goldsmith	78	–	
Turnout				
Registered electors				
Liberal Democrats hold		Swing		
Conservative gain from Liberal Democrats		Swing		

== By-elections between 2015 and 2019 ==
=== Abbey ===
Abbey By-Election 17 November 2016
Party	Candidate	Votes	%	±%
Conservative	Lizzie Gladwyn	350	32.8	–2.4
Liberal Democrats	Gerry Curran	273	25.6	+4.7
Green	Vipul Arvind Patel	252	23.6	–4.5
Labour	Vicky Linda Drew	126	11.8	–5.0
Independent	Jenny Knight	43	4.0	+0.1
UKIP	Marc Ross Hooper	23	2.2	N/A
Majority		77	7.2	
Turnout		1,067		
Conservative gain from Green		Swing		

=== Walcot ===
Walcot By-Election 6 April 2017
Party	Candidate	Votes	%	±%
Liberal Democrats	Richard Emlyn Samuel	750	48.6	+11.2
Green	Tim Stoneman	343	22.2	+0.4
Conservative	Brian Webber	339	22.0	–0.5
Labour	Amber Evelyn Weston	111	7.2	–7.4
Majority		407	26.4	
Turnout		1,548		
Liberal Democrats hold		Swing		

=== Newbridge ===
Newbridge By-Election 4 May 2017
Party	Candidate	Votes	%	±%
Liberal Democrats	Michelle Anne O'Doherty	828	36.8	+11.8
Conservative	Rob Hawking	783	34.8	+7.6
Independent	Lorraine Morgan-Brinkhurst	242	10.1	–4.8
Green	Richard Daniel	209	9.3	–9.7
Labour	Pam Richards	174	7.7	–6.3
Majority		45	2.0	
Turnout		2,236		
Liberal Democrats gain from Conservative		Swing		

=== Kingsmead ===
Kingsmead By-Election 5 July 2018
Party	Candidate	Votes	%	±%
Liberal Democrats	Susan Geraldine Craig	545	41.1	+10.0
Labour	Sharon Louise Gillings	326	24.6	+11.6
Conservative	Thomas Peter Hobson	282	21.3	–6.8
Green	Eric Paul Lucas	172	13.0	–9.5
Majority		219	16.5	
Turnout		1,325		
Liberal Democrats gain from Conservative		Swing		
