= 2025 Hertfordshire County Council election =

2025 English local election

- 1 May 2025

All 78 seats to Hertfordshire County Council 40 seats needed for a majority
- Registered: 890,396
- Turnout: 32.1% (▼5.1 pp)

	First party	Second party	Third party
Leader	Steve Jarvis	Richard Roberts	Graham McAndrew
Party	Liberal Democrats	Conservative	Reform
Leader's seat	Royston West and Rural	King's Langley	Stood in Hertford All Saints (lost) (Note: McAndrew was previously the councillor for Bishop's Stortford Rural, however, he ran in Hertford All Saints in the 2025 election.)
Last election	23 seats, 26.5%	46 seats, 43.3%	0 seats, 0.2%
Seats before	22	42	1
Seats won	31	22	14
Seat change	▲8	▼24	▲14
Popular vote	74,749	74,099	69,090
Percentage	26.1%	26.1%	24.1%
Swing	▼0.4 pp	▼25.9 pp	▲23.9 pp
	Fourth party	Fifth party	Sixth party
Leader	Nigel Bell	Ben Crystall	None
Party	Labour	Green	Independent
Leader's seat	West Watford	Hertford All Saints	None
Last election	7 seats, 21.2%	1 seats, 7.5%	1 seat, 0.8%
Seats before	6	1	5
Seats won	5	5	1
Seat change	▼2	▲4	Steady
Popular vote	38,389	26,532	2,649
Percentage	13.4%	9.3%	0.9%
Swing	▼7.8 pp	▲1.8 pp	▲0.1 pp
- Map showing the results of the 2025 Hertfordshire County Council election. Liberal Democrats in amber, Conservatives in blue, Reform UK in turquoise, Labour in red, Greens in green and independents in grey.

- Council composition after the election.
Leader before election
Richard Roberts
Conservative
Leader after election
Steve Jarvis
Liberal Democrat
No overall control

The 2025 Hertfordshire County Council election was held on 1 May 2025 to elect members to Hertfordshire County Council in Hertfordshire, England. 78 councillors, one from each ward, were elected using the first-past-the-post voting system. This was on the same day as other local elections. Hertfordshire was one of 14 county councils to hold elections in 2025, after the government delayed several local elections to 2026 as part of a plan to reorganise local government.

Prior to the election, the council was under Conservative control, led by councillor Richard Roberts of King's Langley. Following the election the council went under no overall control, with the Liberal Democrats being the largest party. They subsequently formed a minority administration, with Liberal Democrat councillor Steve Jarvis of Royston West and Rural being appointed the new leader of the council at the subsequent annual council meeting on 20 May 2025.

== Background ==
Map showing the results of the 2021 council election

In the 2021 election, the Conservatives won 46 seats, giving them a majority and control of the council. The Liberal Democrats were the second biggest party with 23 seats, followed by Labour with 7 seats and the Greens with 1 seat. The Hemel Hempstead South East seat was won by Jan Maddern, a former Conservative who ran as an independent. The council leader, Conservative councillor Richard Roberts of King's Langley, was elected on 25 May 2021.

Several by-elections took place between the 2021 and 2025 elections:

By-elections
Division	Date	Incumbent		Winner		Cause	Ref.
Division	Date	Party	Councillor	Party	Candidate	Cause	Ref.
Hitchin South	10 March 2022	Liberal Democrats	Paul Clark	Liberal Democrats	Keith Hoskins	Death	
Hitchin North	9 February 2023	Labour	Judi Billing	Labour	Ian Albert	Death	
Harpenden Rural	7 December 2023	Conservative	Annie Brewster	Liberal Democrats	Allison Wren	Appointed High Sheriff of Hertfordshire	
Bedwell	29 August 2024	Labour	Sharon Taylor	Labour	Ellie Plater	Resigned after receiving a peerage and appointed to the House of Lords	

In July 2024, councillor Sara Bedford of Abbots Langley left the Liberal Democrats after a dispute with local party leadership and served the rest of her term as an independent. In the 2024 general election, the Labour Party won seven of the Hertfordshire seats from the Conservatives (Hemel Hempstead, Hertford & Stortford, Hitchin, North East Hertfordshire, Stevenage, Watford and Welwyn Hatfield). The Liberal Democrats won the new seat of Harpenden and Berkhamsted and retained St Albans while the Conservatives retained Broxbourne, Hertsmere and South West Hertfordshire. Overall, of the Hertfordshire seats, Labour won seven, the Conservatives won three and the Liberal Democrats won two. That same month, councillor Ron Tindall of Hemel Hempstead St Paul's was the recipient of misconduct allegations, which he denied. An independent report released in October concluded that Tindall had "made various misogynistic remarks which were completely inappropriate and disrespectful to women" as well as "creat[ing] an uncomfortable and intimidating environment for the complainant to such an extent that they didn’t feel comfortable being left alone in a room with [him]". He was suspended from the Liberal Democrat group on the county council in March 2025.

In October 2024, councillor James Bond of Hatfield North died following a long illness, leaving the seat vacant. No by-election was held. In December, councillor Michelle Vince of Borehamwood North resigned from the Labour Party after being deselected as the candidate for her ward in the upcoming election, serving the rest of her term as an independent. In January 2025, councillor Sunny Thusu of Haldens had the whip removed after it was revealed that he had cheated on his medical school exams in 2023. He was subsequently expelled from the Conservative group on the council and sat the rest of his term as an independent. In March 2025, councillor Graham McAndrew of Bishop's Stortford Rural left the Conservatives and joined Reform UK.

=== Previous council composition ===
After 2021 election		Before 2025 election	
Party	Seats	Party	Seats
Conservative	46	Conservative	42
Liberal Democrats	23	Liberal Democrats	22
Labour	7	Labour	6
Green	1	Green	1
Independent	1	Independent	5
Reform	0	Reform	1
Vacant	—N/a	Vacant	1

==== Changes ====
- December 2021: Paul Clark (Liberal Democrats) dies – by-election held March 2022
- March 2022: Keith Hoskins (Liberal Democrats) wins by-election, holds Hitchin South
- November 2022: Judi Billing (Labour) dies – by-election held February 2023
- February 2023: Ian Albert (Labour) wins by-election, holds Hitchin North
- October 2023: Annie Brewster (Conservative) resigns – by-election held December 2023
- December 2023: Allison Wren (Liberal Democrats) wins by-election, gains Harpenden Rural from Conservatives
- July 2024: Sharon Taylor (Labour) resigns – by-election held August 2024; Sara Bedford (Liberal Democrats) leaves party to sit as an independent
- August 2024: Ellie Plater (Labour) wins by-election, holds Bedwell
- October 2024: James Bond (Conservative) dies – seat left vacant until 2025 election
- January 2025: Sunny Thusu (Conservative) suspended from party; Michelle Vince (Labour) leaves party to sit as an independent
- March 2025: Ron Tindall (Liberal Democrats) suspended from party; Graham McAndrew (Conservative) leaves party to join Reform UK

== Summary ==
=== Overview ===
Reflecting national trends, Reform UK experienced a significant increase in representation, winning 14 seats, the party's first-ever elected seats in the county council's elections. The Conservatives lost over half its seats and overall control of the council, bringing an end to 26 years of majority rule. The Liberal Democrats emerged as the largest party on the council for the first time in the council's history. The Green Party won 5 seats, an increase of 4, and Labour made a net loss of 2 seats . No party achieved a majority, bringing the council into no overall control. After the election, the Liberal Democrats formed a minority administration. On 20 May, they appointed councillor Steve Jarvis of Royston West and Rural as leader of the council and councillor Laurence Brass of Bushey North as chairman of the council.

On 10 May, the Reform UK councillors appointed councillor Doug Bainbridge of Old Stevenage as their group leader on the council, with councillor David Herring of Hemel Hempstead North West being appointed as their deputy leader. The Green Party also appointed a new group leader, councillor Kirsty Taylor-Moran of Ware North, and deputy leader, councillor Matt Fisher of St Albans Central. On 20 May, the day of the council's annual meeting, councillor Tina Bhartwas of Letchworth North left the Labour Party and joined the Liberal Democrats, citing dissatisfaction over the policies of the national Labour government. Councillor Nigel Bell of West Watford, the leader of the council's Labour group, called Bhartwas' move a "blow", while Conservative group leader councillor Richard Roberts of King's Langley criticised Bhartwas, claiming that she had "betrayed" her residents and calling for her to resign and face a by-election.

On 7 October, councillor Caroline Clapper of Watling left the Conservative Party and joined Reform UK. She rejected calls for her to resign and face a by-election, stating it would cause a "significant and unnecessary cost to the taxpayer". In February 2026, councillor Peter Colley of Bedwell left Reform UK and joined Restore Britain. In March 2026, councillor Tony Hill of Flamstead End and Turnford resigned with no reason given, a by-election for his seat was held on 7 May alongside the elections to Broxbourne Borough Council.

=== Election result ===
2025 Hertfordshire County Council election
Party	Candidates	Seats	Gains	Losses	Net gain/loss	Seats %	Votes %	Votes	+/−
Liberal Democrats	78	31	10	2	▲8	39.7	26.1	74,749	–0.4
Conservative	78	22	0	24	▼24	30.7	25.9	74,099	–17.4
Reform	78	14	14	0	▲14	17.9	24.2	69,090	+24.0
Labour	78	5	2	4	▼2	6.4	13.4	38,389	–7.8
Green	77	5	4	0	▲4	6.4	9.3	26,532	+1.8
Independent	5	1	0	0	Steady	1.3	0.9	2,649	+0.1
TUSC	19	0	0	0	Steady	0.0	0.1	181	–0.1
CPA	3	0	0	0	Steady	0.0	<0.1	93	–0.1
British Democrats	1	0	0	0	Steady	0.0	<0.1	87	N/A
Heritage	3	0	0	0	Steady	0.0	<0.1	62	±0.0
Transform	1	0	0	0	Steady	0.0	<0.1	33	N/A
UKIP	1	0	0	0	Steady	0.0	<0.1	28	-0.1
Communist	1	0	0	0	Steady	0.0	<0.1	25	N/A
Alliance for Democracy and Freedom (UK)	1	0	0	0	Steady	0.0	<0.1	24	±0.0

== Results by division ==
=== Broxbourne ===
The Borough of Broxbourne shown within Hertfordshire

Broxbourne district summary
Party	Seats	+/-	Votes	%	+/–
Conservative	4	▼2	7,584	38.0	–24.2
Reform UK	2	▲2	7,060	35.3	N/A
Labour	0	Steady	2,731	13.7	–10.7
Green	0	Steady	1,242	6.2	+2.1
Liberal Democrats	0	Steady	1,060	5.3	+2.9
TUSC	0	Steady	181	0.9	N/A
British Democrats	0	Steady	87	0.4	N/A
UKIP	0	Steady	28	0.1	N/A
Total	6	Steady	19,973	27.6	
Registered electors			72,385		

Division results

Cheshunt Central
Party	Candidate	Votes	%	±%
Conservative	Paul Seeby	1,169	38.2	–22.9
Reform	Siobhan Monaghan	1,007	32.9	New
Labour	Zahra Spencer	564	18.4	–10.5
Liberal Democrats	Kostas Inchenko	161	5.3	–4.8
Green	Madela Baddock	135	4.4	New
TUSC	Aaron Smith	27	0.9	New
Majority		162	5.3	–55.7
Turnout		3,063	25.4	–2.9
Registered electors		12,044		
Conservative hold				

Flamstead End and Turnford
Party	Candidate	Votes	%	±%
Reform	Tony Hill	1,197	38.0	New
Conservative	Mark Mills-Bishop*	1,169	37.1	–30.7
Labour	Madeline McFadden	411	13.1	–8.1
Green	Owen Brett	156	5.0	–2.4
Liberal Democrats	Dave Bromage	107	3.4	–0.2
British Democrats	Ian Seeby	87	2.8	New
TUSC	Robert Landon	21	0.7	New
Majority		28	0.9	New
Turnout		3,148	27.3	–1.1
Registered electors		11,522		
Reform gain from Conservative				

Goffs Oak and Bury Green
Party	Candidate	Votes	%	±%
Reform	Anthony Owen	1,472	42.8	New
Conservative	Corina Gander	1,178	34.2	–29.6
Labour	Ed Dragusin	367	10.7	–6.2
Liberal Democrats	David Payne	234	6.8	–6.4
Green	Ellie Austen	178	5.2	–1.0
TUSC	Bea Gardner Asker	13	0.4	New
Majority		294	8.5	
Turnout		3,442	27.1	–2.8
Registered electors		12,712		
Reform gain from Conservative				

Hoddesdon North
Party	Candidate	Votes	%	±%
Conservative	Alexander Curtis	1,460	40.7	–27.8
Reform	Giles Hall	1,302	36.3	New
Labour	Sarah Chapman	384	10.7	–10.5
Green	Ian Kemp	220	6.1	New
Liberal Democrats	Nick Belfitt	170	4.7	–5.5
UKIP	Albert Nicolas	28	0.8	New
TUSC	Pauline Sulman	21	0.6	New
Majority		158	4.4	–64.1
Turnout		3,585	30.0	+1.9
Registered electors		11,948		
Conservative hold				

Hoddesdon South
Party	Candidate	Votes	%	±%
Conservative	Steve Wortley	1,669	43.8	–23.2
Reform	Adam Clayton	1,239	32.5	New
Green	Sally Kemp	371	9.7	–0.7
Labour Co-op	Aeden Rooney	314	8.2	–2.8
Liberal Democrats	Tim Vizer	197	5.2	–2.8
TUSC	Josh Asker	20	0.5	New
Majority		430	11.3	–55.8
Turnout		3,810	31.0	–1.6
Registered electors		12,306		
Conservative hold				

Waltham Cross
Party	Candidate	Votes	%	±%
Conservative	Dee Hart*	939	32.1	–14.1
Reform	James Beatty	843	28.8	New
Labour	Enka Plaku	691	23.6	–19.8
Liberal Democrats	Fabio Bonfante	191	6.5	+2.3
Green	Bob Gledhill	182	6.2	New
TUSC	Christine Thomas	79	2.7	New
Majority		96	3.3	+0.5
Turnout		2,925	24.7	–6.4
Registered electors		11,848		
Conservative hold				

=== Dacorum ===
The Borough of Dacorum shown within Hertfordshire

Dacorum district summary
Party	Seats	+/-	Votes	%	+/–
Liberal Democrats	4	Steady	9,828	27.6	–2.4
Conservative	3	▼2	9,468	26.6	–15.5
Reform UK	2	▲2	8,761	24.6	+24.4
Independent	1	Steady	1,183	3.3	–0.2
Labour	0	Steady	3,621	10.2	–4.8
Green	0	Steady	2,680	7.6	–1.6
Transform	0	Steady	33	0.1	N/A
Total	10	Steady	35,574	30.9	
Registered electors			115,179		

Division results

Berkhamsted
Party	Candidate	Votes	%	±%
Liberal Democrats	Nigel Taylor*	2,250	51.7	–0.1
Conservative	Gbola Adeleke	812	18.7	–11.1
Reform	Adrian Steeples	663	15.2	New
Green	Kevin Fielding	436	10.0	+0.2
Labour	Geraint Cooksley	193	4.4	–4.2
Majority		1,438	33.0	+11.0
Turnout		4,354	36.1	–10.4
Registered electors		12,058		
Liberal Democrats hold		Swing	+5.5	

Bridgewater
Party	Candidate	Votes	%	±%
Liberal Democrats	Caroline Smith-Wright	1,411	35.7	–3.0
Conservative	Graeme Elliot	1,211	30.7	–15.5
Reform	Fred Philpott	878	22.3	New
Green	Rose Sheridan	265	6.7	+0.4
Labour	Deborah Charlton	181	4.6	–2.6
Majority		200	5.0	
Turnout		3,946	35.8	–5.3
Registered electors		11,037		
Liberal Democrats gain from Conservative		Swing	+6.3	

Hemel Hempstead East
Party	Candidate	Votes	%	±%
Conservative	Andrew Williams*	991	30.4	–28.9
Reform	Daniel Bagley	935	28.6	New
Liberal Democrats	Cathy McArevey	887	27.2	+15.0
Labour	Jenny Dickson	301	9.2	–11.0
Green	Paul de Hoest	151	4.6	–3.7
Majority		56	1.8	–37.3
Turnout		3,265	29.6	–0.9
Registered electors		11,057		
Conservative hold				

Hemel Hempstead North East
Party	Candidate	Votes	%	±%
Conservative	Colette Wyatt-Lowe*	1,133	42.6	–17.5
Reform	Lindsey Betts	701	26.4	New
Labour	Goverdhan Silwal	493	18.5	–3.2
Liberal Democrats	Nicholas Keay	159	6.0	–4.2
Green	Bill Burgar	128	4.8	–3.3
Independent	Brian Hall	45	1.7	New
Majority		432	16.2	–22.3
Turnout		2,659	26.0	–1.0
Registered electors		10,228		
Conservative hold				

Hemel Hempstead North West
Party	Candidate	Votes	%	±%
Reform	David Herring	1,015	32.1	New
Conservative	Fiona Guest*	990	31.4	–24.1
Labour	Angela Mitchell	695	22.0	–1.5
Liberal Democrats	Carrie Proctor-Link	275	8.7	–2.8
Green	Sherief Hassan	183	5.8	–3.7
Majority		25	0.7	
Turnout		3,158	27.9	–2.1
Registered electors		11,335		
Reform gain from Conservative				

Hemel Hempstead South East
Party	Candidate	Votes	%	±%
Independent	Jan Maddern*	1,138	35.2	–1.4
Reform	Laura Berrill	823	25.3	New
Conservative	Margaret Griffiths	517	16.0	–14.0
Labour	Rebecca Mackenzie	371	11.5	–11.5
Liberal Democrats	Christopher Townsend	200	6.2	+1.5
Green	Andrew Lambert	188	5.8	±0.0
Majority		315	9.9	+3.5
Turnout		3,237	26.5	–5.0
Registered electors		12,243		
Independent hold				

Hemel Hempstead St Paul's
Party	Candidate	Votes	%	±%
Reform	Christopher Wright	966	32.8	New
Liberal Democrats	Robin Bromham	737	25.0	–17.8
Labour	Mohamed Fawzi	551	18.7	–2.4
Conservative	Julie Banks	537	18.2	–20.0
Green	Paul Harris	157	5.3	–2.6
Majority		229	7.8	
Turnout		2,948	27.1	+0.8
Registered electors		10,915		
Reform gain from Liberal Democrats				

Hemel Hempstead Town
Party	Candidate	Votes	%	±%
Liberal Democrats	Adrian England*	1,332	37.7	+3.8
Conservative	William Wyatt-Lowe	865	24.5	–10.8
Reform	Linda Ashdown	757	21.4	New
Labour	Janet Ventiroso	345	9.8	–5.2
Green	Christine Ridley	203	5.7	–2.5
Transform	Gary Ruff	33	0.9	New
Majority		467	13.2	+7.0
Turnout		3,535	28.5	–8.1
Registered electors		12,414		
Liberal Democrats hold		Swing	+7.3	

King's Langley
Party	Candidate	Votes	%	±%
Conservative	Richard Roberts*	1,370	37.6	–24.5
Reform	James Evans	1,067	29.3	New
Green	Ashley Lawrence	488	13.4	–2.1
Liberal Democrats	Susan Jackson	423	11.6	+2.3
Labour	Jane Gibbons	293	8.1	–5.0
Majority		303	8.3	–38.3
Turnout		3,641	33.2	–3.5
Registered electors		10,981		
Conservative hold				

Tring
Party	Candidate	Votes	%	±%
Liberal Democrats	Sally Symington*	2,154	44.6	–5.5
Conservative	Justin Charlton-Jones	1,042	21.5	–8.5
Reform	Andy White	956	19.8	New
Green	Joe Stopps	481	10.0	–0.9
Labour	Jim Lawler	198	4.1	–4.9
Majority		1,112	23.1	+3.0
Turnout		4,831	37.5	–7.2
Registered electors		12,911		
Liberal Democrats hold		Swing	–1.5	

=== East Hertfordshire ===
East Hertfordshire district shown within Hertfordshire

East Hertfordshire district summary
Party	Seats	+/-	Votes	%	+/–
Green	4	▲3	7,735	20.3	+5.4
Conservative	3	▼5	10,931	28.7	–21.8
Liberal Democrats	2	▲1	5,361	14.1	–0.6
Reform UK	1	▲1	10,375	27.2	+27.0
Labour	0	Steady	3,639	9.5	–9.1
TUSC	0	Steady	34	0.1	±0.0
ADF	0	Steady	24	0.1	–0.2
Heritage	0	Steady	11	<0.1	N/A
Total	10	Steady	38,110	32.8	
Registered electors			116,299		

Division results

Bishop's Stortford East
Party	Candidate	Votes	%	±%
Liberal Democrats	Calvin Horner*	1,536	44.7	–0.9
Reform	Mike Casey	774	22.5	New
Conservative	David Snowdon	628	18.3	–15.4
Labour	Paul Newell	310	9.0	–4.7
Green	Andrew Zsibrita	175	5.1	–1.9
Heritage	Barry Hensall	11	0.3	New
Majority		762	22.2	+10.3
Turnout		3,434	31.3	–7.3
Registered electors		11,099		
Liberal Democrats hold				

Bishop's Stortford Rural
Party	Candidate	Votes	%	±%
Conservative	Mark Pope	1,087	30.7	–23.1
Reform	Jonathan Grose	1,080	30.5	New
Liberal Democrats	Martin Adams	643	18.1	+2.5
Labour	Susan Jackson	396	11.2	–8.9
Green	George Williams	316	8.9	–1.7
ADF	Jane Fowler	24	0.7	New
Majority		7	0.2	–33.5
Turnout		3,553	32.4	–1.7
Registered electors		10,974		
Conservative hold				

Bishop's Stortford West
Party	Candidate	Votes	%	±%
Liberal Democrats	Miriam Swainston	1,072	27.5	+8.6
Reform	Harrison Grose	949	24.4	New
Conservative	John Wyllie	947	24.3	–20.1
Labour	David Jacobs	632	16.2	–9.0
Green	Maura Connolly	294	7.6	–4.0
Majority		123	3.2	–16.0
Turnout		3,900	29.0	–2.6
Registered electors		13,453		
Liberal Democrats gain from Conservative				

Buntingford
Party	Candidate	Votes	%	±%
Reform	Terry Smith	1,584	37.3	+34.9
Conservative	Jeff Jones*	1,154	27.2	–33.4
Green	Georgina Schwan	1,017	23.9	+6.1
Labour	Ian Bell	249	5.9	–7.6
Liberal Democrats	Karl Harrington	239	5.6	–0.1
Majority		430	10.1	
Turnout		4,243	34.7	+1.1
Registered electors		12,242		
Reform gain from Conservative		Swing	+34.2	

Hertford All Saints
Party	Candidate	Votes	%	±%
Green	Ben Crystall*	1,870	49.6	+6.4
Reform	Graham McAndrew	749	19.9	New
Conservative	Sean Howlett	725	19.2	–17.9
Labour	Nahum Clements	247	6.6	–8.1
Liberal Democrats	Andrew Porrer	173	4.6	–0.4
Majority		1,121	29.8	+23.7
Turnout		3,767	37.2	–2.4
Registered electors		10,695		
Green hold				

Hertford Rural
Party	Candidate	Votes	%	±%
Conservative	Ken Crofton*	1,670	40.1	–23.1
Reform	Gayle Ward	1,111	26.7	New
Liberal Democrats	Joe Howlett	709	17.0	+2.7
Green	Lydia Somerville	362	8.7	–3.1
Labour Co-op	Rob Pinkham	301	7.2	–3.5
Majority		559	13.4	–35.5
Turnout		4,162	38.1	–1.4
Registered electors		10,930		
Conservative hold				

Hertford St Andrews
Party	Candidate	Votes	%	±%
Green	Rachel Carter	1,194	29.3	New
Conservative	Ryan Henson	1,135	27.9	–18.4
Reform	David West	834	20.5	New
Labour	Jack Risbridger	673	16.5	–25.7
Liberal Democrats	Geoff Madge	204	5.0	–6.6
TUSC	Sean Figg	25	0.6	New
Majority		59	1.4	New
Turnout		4,071	33.2	–2.3
Registered electors		12,249		
Green gain from Conservative				

Sawbridgeworth
Party	Candidate	Votes	%	±%
Conservative	Eric Buckmaster*	1,802	45.1	–19.9
Reform	John Burmicz	1,230	30.8	New
Labour	Dawn Newell	376	9.4	–6.1
Liberal Democrats	Julia Davies	318	8.0	–11.5
Green	Sarah Santos	267	6.7	New
Majority		572	14.3	–31.3
Turnout		3,996	31.3	–3.1
Registered electors		12,763		
Conservative hold				

Ware North
Party	Candidate	Votes	%	±%
Green	Kirsty Taylor-Moran	1,100	32.4	–1.7
Reform	Nigel Adams	1,031	30.4	New
Conservative	David Andrews*	845	24.9	–26.2
Liberal Democrats	David Davies	203	6.0	New
Labour	Jack Kidston	201	5.9	–7.9
TUSC	Bryan Clare	9	0.3	–0.7
Majority		69	2.0	
Turnout		3,393	32.2	–2.0
Registered electors		10,534		
Green gain from Conservative				

Ware South
Party	Candidate	Votes	%	±%
Green	Steven Watson	1,140	31.4	+15.6
Reform	Joanne Belsey	1,033	28.5	New
Conservative	Lesley Greensmyth	938	25.9	–27.0
Liberal Democrats	Freddie Jewitt	264	7.3	–2.1
Labour	Martin Smith	254	7.0	–11.4
Majority		107	2.9	
Turnout		3,628	32.0	–0.7
Registered electors		11,360		
Green gain from Conservative				

=== Hertsmere ===
The Borough of Hertsmere shown within Hertfordshire

Hertsmere district summary
Party	Seats	+/-	Votes	%	+/–
Conservative	4	Steady	8,710	35.8	–14.3
Reform UK	2	▲2	5,800	23.8	N/A
Liberal Democrats	1	Steady	4,148	17.0	+2.0
Labour	0	▼2	3,609	14.8	–12.0
Green	0	Steady	1,124	4.6	–0.9
Independent	0	Steady	965	4.0	+1.7
Total	7	Steady	24,356	30.8	
Registered electors			79,008		

Division results

Borehamwood North
Party	Candidate	Votes	%	±%
Reform	Simon Rhodes	972	30.5	New
Independent	Michelle Vince*	751	23.6	New
Conservative	Alexander Bright	628	19.7	–20.0
Labour Co-op	Parveen Rani	609	19.1	–33.6
Liberal Democrats	Hannah Uri	123	3.9	+0.8
Green	Narinder Sian	105	3.2	±0.0
Majority		221	6.9	M/A
Turnout		3,188	27.0	–2.2
Registered electors		11,755		
Reform gain from Labour				

Borehamwood South
Party	Candidate	Votes	%	±%
Reform	Saul Jacob	1,018	33.1	New
Labour	Richard Butler*	881	28.7	–17.8
Conservative	Lucy Selby	862	28.0	–13.8
Green	Madalyn Biefeld	163	5.3	–0.7
Liberal Democrats	Annabel Hennessy	151	4.9	+1.4
Majority		137	4.4	New
Turnout		3,075	28.0	–4.1
Registered electors		11,156		
Reform gain from Labour				

Bushey North
Party	Candidate	Votes	%	±%
Liberal Democrats	Laurence Brass*	1,640	53.9	+1.2
Conservative	David Carter	596	19.6	–14.3
Reform	Antony Michaelson	501	16.5	New
Labour Co-op	Michael Mandonga	171	5.6	–3.2
Green	Michael Rayment	132	4.3	–0.3
Majority		1,044	34.3	+15.5
Turnout		3,040	28.0	–10.8
Registered electors		10,846		
Liberal Democrats hold		Swing	+7.6	

Bushey South
Party	Candidate	Votes	%	±%
Conservative	Seamus Quilty*	1,502	39.1	–17.8
Liberal Democrats	Chris Shenton	1,411	36.7	+8.2
Reform	Arabella Rolland	637	16.6	New
Labour Co-op	Nik Oakley	172	4.5	–4.8
Green	Matt Wheeler	119	3.1	–2.2
Majority		91	2.4	–26.0
Turnout		3,841	35.0	–4.3
Registered electors		10,942		
Conservative hold		Swing	–13.2	

Potters Bar East
Party	Candidate	Votes	%	±%
Conservative	John Graham*	1,362	34.5	–16.8
Reform	Craig Young	1,081	27.4	New
Labour Co-op	Tushar Kumar	789	20.0	–15.4
Liberal Democrats	Lisa Griffin	257	6.5	+0.6
Green	David Lister	240	6.1	–0.3
Independent	Jonathan Meldrum	214	5.4	New
Majority		281	7.1	–9.8
Turnout		3,943	34.0	–3.1
Registered electors		11,580		
Conservative hold				

Potters Bar West and Shenley
Party	Candidate	Votes	%	±%
Conservative	Morris Bright*	1,261	35.4	–10.0
Reform	Louise Soffer	1,002	28.1	New
Labour	Radhika Settipalli	723	20.3	–10.4
Liberal Democrats	Holly Gunning	335	9.4	+6.9
Green	Ed Poole	243	6.8	+1.1
Majority		259	7.3	–7.3
Turnout		3,564	31.0	–7.9
Registered electors		11,431		
Conservative hold				

Watling
Party	Candidate	Votes	%	±%
Conservative	Caroline Clapper*	2,499	67.4	–7.9
Reform	Gus Channer	589	15.9	New
Labour Co-op	Satvinder Juss	264	7.1	–5.1
Liberal Democrats	Stuart Howard	231	6.2	+0.5
Green	Cheryl Stungo	122	3.3	–3.5
Majority		1,910	51.5	–12.6
Turnout		3,705	33.0	–6.9
Registered electors		11,298		
Conservative hold				

=== North Hertfordshire ===
North Hertfordshire district shown within Hertfordshire

North Hertfordshire district summary
Party	Seats	+/-	Votes	%	+/-
Liberal Democrats	4	▲2	10,175	27.0	+4.7
Labour	3	▲1	7,630	20.3	–4.7
Conservative	2	▼3	9,243	24.6	–18.7
Reform UK	0	Steady	7,422	19.7	+19.5
Green	0	Steady	3,065	8.1	–0.5
CPA	0	Steady	93	0.2	–0.2
Total	9	Steady	37,628	36.9	
Registered electors			101,857	–	

Division results

Baldock and Letchworth East
Party	Candidate	Votes	%	±%
Labour Co-op	Alistair Willoughby	1,432	35.4	+6.7
Conservative	Michael Muir*	1,218	30.1	–15.0
Reform	Pippa Clayton	735	18.2	New
Liberal Democrats	David Chalmers	379	9.4	–4.9
Green	Tim Lee	282	7.0	–4.9
Majority		214	5.3	
Turnout		4,046	37.5	–2.9
Registered electors		10,789		
Labour Co-op gain from Conservative		Swing	+10.9	

Hitchin North
Party	Candidate	Votes	%	±%
Labour Co-op	Ian Albert*	1,718	41.9	–10.5
Green	Deolinda Eltringham	737	18.0	+7.7
Reform	Ashley Brandon	622	15.2	New
Conservative	Michael Goddard	581	14.2	–12.3
Liberal Democrats	Dominic Griffiths	415	10.1	+0.7
CPA	Daisy Appoh	28	0.7	–0.7
Majority		981	23.9	–2.0
Turnout		4,101	33.9	–9.2
Registered electors		12,087		
Labour Co-op hold		Swing	–9.1	

Hitchin Rural
Party	Candidate	Votes	%	±%
Conservative	David Barnard*	1,302	33.8	–14.6
Labour	Nigel Mason	852	22.1	+3.5
Reform	Ravi Odedra	836	21.7	New
Liberal Democrats	Sal Jarvis	488	12.7	+3.3
Green	Mary Marshall	350	9.1	–13.2
CPA	Bob Adams	28	0.7	–0.5
Majority		450	11.7	–14.4
Turnout		3,856	35.6	–6.2
Registered electors		10,846		
Conservative hold		Swing	–9.1	

Hitchin South
Party	Candidate	Votes	%	±%
Liberal Democrats	Chris Lucas	2,020	43.5	+5.8
Conservative	Anthony John-Goodman	889	19.1	–17.8
Labour	Indie Sunner	798	17.2	+2.2
Reform	Tracy Maney	590	13.0	New
Green	Elizabeth Ryder Ford	309	6.7	–2.2
CPA	Sid Cordle	37	0.8	–0.3
Majority		1,131	24.4	+23.6
Turnout		4,643	42.0	–5.0
Registered electors		11,056		
Liberal Democrats hold		Swing	+11.8	

Knebworth and Codicote
Party	Candidate	Votes	%	±%
Conservative	Ralph Muncer	1,531	38.4	–17.1
Liberal Democrats	Sandreni Bonfante	999	25.1	+5.5
Reform	James Murray-Watson	845	21.2	New
Labour	Daniel Allen	345	8.7	–5.6
Green	Des Stephens	265	6.6	–3.9
Majority		1,266	13.3	–22.6
Turnout		3,985	39.1	–5.8
Registered electors		10,199		
Conservative hold		Swing	–11.3	

Letchworth North
Party	Candidate	Votes	%	±%
Labour Co-op	Tina Bhartwas*	1,141	29.7	–16.0
Reform	Harrison Edwards	984	25.7	New
Conservative	Hammad Baig	856	22.3	–22.4
Liberal Democrats	Claire Winchester	457	11.9	+2.4
Green	David Morris	398	10.4	New
Majority		157	4.0	+3.0
Turnout		3,836	32.4	–5.2
Registered electors		11,852		
Labour Co-op hold				

Letchworth South
Party	Candidate	Votes	%	±%
Liberal Democrats	Sean Prendergast	1,489	35.2	+17.6
Conservative	Terry Hone*	1,079	25.5	–22.2
Reform	Garry Warren	783	18.5	+16.6
Labour Co-op	Amy Allen	632	14.9	–9.7
Green	Dugald Muir	246	5.8	–2.3
Majority		410	9.7	
Turnout		4,229	38.9	–4.0
Registered electors		10,858		
Liberal Democrats gain from Conservative		Swing	+19.9	

Royston East and Ermine
Party	Candidate	Votes	%	±%
Liberal Democrats	Ruth Brown	1,711	39.1	+11.5
Reform	Fraser Jones	1,033	23.6	New
Conservative	Callum Bartram-Bell	996	22.7	–28.2
Labour Co-op	Sarah Lucas	372	8.5	–6.2
Green	Peter Wilkin	268	6.1	–0.7
Majority		678	15.5	
Turnout		4,380	37.7	–2.2
Registered electors		11,609		
Liberal Democrats gain from Conservative				

Royston West and Rural
Party	Candidate	Votes	%	±%
Liberal Democrats	Steve Jarvis*	2,217	48.7	–3.0
Reform	Alan Deeney	994	21.8	New
Conservative	Suzy Brandes	791	17.4	–20.5
Labour Co-op	Vijaiya Poopalasingham	340	7.5	–2.9
Green	Julie Rackham	210	4.6	New
Majority		1,223	26.9	+13.1
Turnout		4,552	36.2	–5.0
Registered electors		12,561		
Liberal Democrats hold				

=== St Albans ===
St Albans city and district shown within Hertfordshire

St Albans district summary
Party	Seats	+/-	Votes	%	+/–
Liberal Democrats	8	▲2	18,710	45.6	–0.6
Conservative	1	▼3	8,862	21.6	–13.1
Green	1	▲1	4,537	11.0	+2.9
Reform UK	0	Steady	6,263	15.3	+15.0
Labour	0	Steady	2,665	6.5	–4.2
Communist	0	Steady	25	0.1	N/A
Total	10	Steady	41,062	36.5	
Registered electors			112,394		

Division results

Colney Heath and Marshalswick
Party	Candidate	Votes	%	±%
Liberal Democrats	John Hale*	2,234	55.1	+2.5
Conservative	Frances Leonard	767	18.9	–14.9
Reform	Kaylee Muldoon	680	16.8	New
Green	Sally Leonard	252	6.2	–0.4
Labour	Nick Pullinger	124	3.0	–4.0
Majority		1,467	36.1	+17.4
Turnout		4,057	36.2	–8.3
Registered electors		11,254		
Liberal Democrats hold		Swing	+8.7	

Harpenden North East
Party	Candidate	Votes	%	±%
Liberal Democrats	Stuart Roberts	1,730	40.6	–1.2
Conservative	Teresa Heritage	1,511	35.4	–5.5
Reform	David Johnson	499	11.7	New
Green	Lesley Baker	324	7.6	–1.2
Labour	Neil Mulcock	201	4.7	–3.8
Majority		219	5.1	+4.3
Turnout		4,265	37.4	–6.5
Registered electors		11,424		
Liberal Democrats hold		Swing	–2.2	

Harpenden Rural
Party	Candidate	Votes	%	±%
Liberal Democrats	Allison Wren*	1,661	39.0	+13.7
Conservative	Ian Hawking	1,172	27.5	–29.6
Reform	Philip Wells	939	22.1	New
Green	Oliver Hitch	289	6.8	–0.1
Labour	Tom Chatfield	196	4.6	–6.1
Majority		489	11.5	
Turnout		4,257	37.6	–6.6
Registered electors		11,383		
Liberal Democrats gain from Conservative		Swing	+21.7	

Harpenden South West
Party	Candidate	Votes	%	±%
Conservative	Matt Cowley	2,365	47.4	–7.3
Liberal Democrats	Edgar Hill	1,483	29.7	+5.0
Reform	Stephen Bird	550	11.0	New
Labour	Ben Dearman	314	6.3	–2.1
Green	Tanja Bruckmann-Rath	282	5.6	–6.6
Majority		882	17.7	–12.4
Turnout		4,994	42.8	–3.7
Registered electors		11,710		
Conservative hold		Swing	–6.2	

London Colney
Party	Candidate	Votes	%	±%
Liberal Democrats	Liz Needham	965	32.0	+6.7
Labour	Mike Hobday	741	24.6	–5.3
Reform	Eleanor Jackson	667	22.1	New
Conservative	James Cook	478	15.9	–20.5
Green	Mark Park-Crowne	164	5.4	–3.0
Majority		224	7.4	
Turnout		3,015	32.6	–1.6
Registered electors		9,266		
Liberal Democrats gain from Conservative		Swing	+6.0	

St Albans Central
Party	Candidate	Votes	%	±%
Green	Matt Fisher	1,801	40.2	+28.2
Liberal Democrats	Jojo Godfrey	1,795	40.1	–22.2
Reform	David Appleby	352	7.8	New
Conservative	Ambrose Killen	311	6.9	–9.7
Labour	Mason Day	197	4.4	–4.8
Communist	Mark Ewington	25	0.6	New
Majority		6	0.1	
Turnout		4,481	36.7	–8.9
Registered electors		12,269		
Green gain from Liberal Democrats		Swing	+25.2	

St Albans East
Party	Candidate	Votes	%	±%
Liberal Democrats	Anthony Rowlands*	2,344	60.7	–0.6
Reform	Jane Dawson-Davis	507	13.1	New
Green	Lucy Swift	408	10.6	+2.6
Conservative	Richard Curthoys	352	9.1	–10.4
Labour	John Paton	249	6.6	–4.6
Majority		1,837	47.6	+5.8
Turnout		3,860	34.5	–10.0
Registered electors		11,203		
Liberal Democrats hold				

St Albans North
Party	Candidate	Votes	%	±%
Liberal Democrats	Helen Campbell*	2,080	56.3	+1.4
Reform	Stewart Vassie	456	12.3	+10.9
Conservative	Don Deepthi	453	12.3	–12.0
Green	Livvy Gibbs	449	12.2	+5.0
Labour	Sarah Heiser	256	6.9	–5.2
Majority		1,624	44.0	+13.4
Turnout		3,694	34.6	–14.3
Registered electors		10,693		
Liberal Democrats hold		Swing	–4.8	

St Albans South
Party	Candidate	Votes	%	±%
Liberal Democrats	Sandy Walkington*	2,555	60.9	–1.3
Reform	Haylee Freedman	524	12.5	+11.1
Conservative	Graham Leonard	499	11.9	–8.5
Green	Juliet Voisey	385	9.2	+3.8
Labour	Steve Clark	230	5.5	–5.1
Majority		2,031	48.4	+6.6
Turnout		4,193	37.8	–3.1
Registered electors		11,151		
Liberal Democrats hold		Swing	–6.2	

St Stephen's
Party	Candidate	Votes	%	±%
Liberal Democrats	Ajanta Hilton	1,863	43.9	–2.3
Reform	Craig Holliday	1,089	25.7	New
Conservative	Stella Nash	954	22.4	–23.8
Green	Gabriel Roberts	183	4.3	–1.3
Labour	Laurence Chester	157	3.7	–2.6
Majority		774	18.2	
Turnout		4,246	35.3	–10.0
Registered electors		12,041		
Liberal Democrats gain from Conservative				

=== Stevenage ===
The Borough of Stevenage shown within Hertfordshire

Stevenage district summary
Party	Seats	+/-	Votes	%	+/-
Reform UK	5	▲5	7,086	34.8	+34.5
Liberal Democrats	1	Steady	2,978	14.6	–0.5
Labour	0	▼1	4,896	24.0	–12.3
Conservative	0	▼4	3,928	19.3	–21.3
Green	0	Steady	1,325	6.5	+0.8
TUSC	0	Steady	176	0.9	–0.6
Total	6	Steady	20,443	31.0	
Registered electors			66,021		

Division results

Bedwell
Party	Candidate	Votes	%	±%
Reform	Peter Colley	1,196	39.9	New
Labour Co-op	Ellie Plater*	853	28.4	–19.1
Conservative	David Denny-Stubbs	422	14.1	–20.5
Liberal Democrats	Nigel Bye	263	8.8	–0.9
Green	Balgiisa Ahmed	227	7.6	+1.6
TUSC	Steve Glennon	38	1.3	–0.8
Majority		343	11.5	
Turnout		3,007	27.5	–5.9
Registered electors		10,937		
Reform gain from Labour				

Broadwater
Party	Candidate	Votes	%	±%
Reform	Janet Bainbridge	1,254	35.4	New
Conservative	Adam Mitchell*	949	26.8	–21.4
Labour Co-op	Coleen De Freitas	811	22.9	–7.8
Liberal Democrats	David Barks	277	7.8	–1.2
Green	Glen Rozemont	228	6.4	–1.1
TUSC	Helen Kerr	27	0.8	–0.8
Majority		305	8.6	
Turnout		3,557	30.5	–4.3
Registered electors		11,668		
Reform gain from Conservative				

Chells
Party	Candidate	Votes	%	±%
Liberal Democrats	Robin Parker*	1,556	44.1	–1.9
Reform	Robert Henry	1,095	31.0	New
Labour Co-op	Forhad Chowdhury	407	11.5	–8.7
Conservative	Margaret Notley	318	9.0	–18.5
Green	Dave Ingarfill	128	3.6	–1.4
TUSC	Mark Gentleman	28	0.8	–0.5
Majority		461	13.1	–5.3
Turnout		3,536	31.6	–4.5
Registered electors		11,205		
Liberal Democrats hold				

Old Stevenage
Party	Candidate	Votes	%	±%
Reform	Doug Bainbridge	1,283	34.4	New
Labour Co-op	Richard Henry	980	26.2	–15.0
Conservative	Maria Wheeler	802	21.5	–23.3
Liberal Democrats	Jill Brinkworth	331	8.9	+2.7
Green	Becca Watts	310	8.3	–1.2
TUSC	Trevor Palmer	29	0.8	New
Majority		303	8.2	New
Turnout		3,747	34.9	–3.5
Registered electors		10,743		
Reform gain from Conservative				

Shephall
Party	Candidate	Votes	%	±%
Reform	Wendy Rouse	1,207	38.5	New
Labour Co-op	Jackie Hollywell	841	26.8	–14.5
Conservative	Victoria Facey	622	19.8	–26.8
Liberal Democrats	Jaysica Marvell	261	8.3	–1.3
Green	Stephani Mok	175	5.6	New
TUSC	Barbara Clare	29	0.9	–1.6
Majority		366	11.7	
Turnout		3,147	29.5	–3.4
Registered electors		10,659		
Reform gain from Conservative				

St Nicholas
Party	Candidate	Votes	%	±%
Reform	Matthew Hurst	1,051	30.5	+28.7
Labour Co-op	Claire Parris	1,004	29.2	–9.8
Conservative	Phil Bibby*	815	23.7	–18.3
Liberal Democrats	Neil Brinkworth	290	8.4	–1.7
Green	Jennifer Arndt	257	7.5	+1.9
TUSC	Amber Gentleman	25	0.7	–0.8
Majority		47	1.3	
Turnout		3,449	31.9	–5.7
Registered electors		10,809		
Reform gain from Conservative		Swing	+19.3	

=== Three Rivers ===
Three Rivers district shown within Hertfordshire

Three Rivers district summary
Party	Seats	+/-	Votes	%	+/-
Liberal Democrats	3	Steady	7,377	31.9	–5.4
Conservative	3	Steady	6,465	28.0	–12.1
Reform UK	0	Steady	5,050	21.9	N/A
Green	0	Steady	2,118	9.2	+0.8
Labour	0	Steady	1,592	6.9	–6.6
Independent	0	Steady	501	2.2	+1.7
Total	6	Steady	23,103	33.4	
Registered electors			69,237		

Division results

Abbots Langley
Party	Candidate	Votes	%	±%
Liberal Democrats	Stephen Giles-Medhurst	1,389	34.0	–14.5
Conservative	Vicky Edwards	1,063	26.0	–2.7
Reform	Gavin Casey	786	19.2	New
Independent	Sara Bedford*	501	12.2	New
Green	Jane Powell	178	4.4	–1.6
Labour	Pierce Culliton	174	4.3	–12.5
Majority		326	8.0	–11.8
Turnout		4,091	33.3	–0.9
Registered electors		12,281		
Liberal Democrats hold		Swing	+5.9	

Croxley
Party	Candidate	Votes	%	±%
Liberal Democrats	Chris Lloyd*	1,895	45.1	–6.1
Green	Chris Mitchell	1,211	28.8	+12.3
Reform	George Moss	677	16.1	New
Conservative	Gordon Elvey	305	7.3	–19.0
Labour	Jeni Swift Gillett	110	2.6	–3.5
Majority		684	16.3	–8.6
Turnout		4,198	39.6	–6.7
Registered electors		10,596		
Liberal Democrats hold		Swing	–9.2	

Rickmansworth East and Oxhey Park
Party	Candidate	Votes	%	±%
Conservative	Vishal Patel	1,533	37.9	–16.8
Liberal Democrats	Raj Khiroya	1,205	29.8	+6.8
Reform	Sonja Flynn	917	22.7	New
Green	Deesha Chandra	198	4.9	–3.5
Labour	Bruce Prochnik	192	4.7	–9.2
Majority		328	8.1	–23.6
Turnout		4,045	35.6	–3.9
Registered electors		11,355		
Conservative hold		Swing	–11.8	

Rickmansworth West
Party	Candidate	Votes	%	±%
Conservative	Paula Hiscocks*	1,278	35.9	–13.5
Liberal Democrats	Simy Dhyani	1,165	32.7	–3.3
Reform	Dane Clarke	820	23.0	New
Green	Malcolm Lee	177	5.0	–1.4
Labour	Margaret Gallagher	124	3.5	–4.7
Majority		113	3.2	–10.2
Turnout		3,564	33.0	–4.2
Registered electors		10,797		
Conservative hold		Swing	–5.1	

South Oxhey and Eastbury
Party	Candidate	Votes	%	±%
Conservative	Christopher Alley*	1,011	31.1	–15.6
Reform	Taylor Smith	975	30.0	New
Labour	Stephen King	839	25.8	–11.1
Liberal Democrats	Rhys Southall	275	8.5	–2.5
Green	Chris Lawrence	149	4.6	±0.0
Majority		36	1.1	–8.7
Turnout		3,249	26.2	–4.8
Registered electors		12,410		
Conservative hold				

Three Rivers Rural
Party	Candidate	Votes	%	±%
Liberal Democrats	Louise Price	1,448	36.6	–10.9
Conservative	Ciaran Reed	1,275	32.2	–5.8
Reform	Melvyn Clifford	875	22.1	New
Green	Roger Stafford	205	5.2	–1.8
Labour	Stuart Lines	153	3.9	–1.2
Majority		173	4.4	–5.1
Turnout		3,956	33.5	–10.1
Registered electors		11,798		
Liberal Democrats hold		Swing	–2.6	

=== Watford ===
The Borough of Watford shown within Hertfordshire

Watford district summary
Party	Seats	+/-	Votes	%	+/-
Liberal Democrats	5	▲1	9,091	45.1	+5.3
Labour	1	▼1	3,716	18.4	–11.5
Reform UK	0	Steady	4,051	20.1	+19.8
Conservative	0	Steady	2,058	10.2	–16.8
Green	0	Steady	1,102	5.5	+3.5
TUSC	0	Steady	126	0.6	–0.1
Heritage	0	Steady	26	0.1	–0.1
Total	6	Steady	20,170	27.1	
Registered electors			74,484		

Division results

Central Watford and Oxhey
Party	Candidate	Votes	%	±%
Liberal Democrats	Peter Taylor	1,850	55.4	+6.6
Reform	Neal Webber	539	16.1	+14.6
Labour	Sonu Masania	430	12.9	–10.5
Conservative	Peter Williams	283	8.5	–10.9
Green	Matt Jones	206	6.2	–0.6
TUSC	James O'Connor	33	1.0	New
Majority		1,311	39.3	+13.9
Turnout		3,341	25.3	–8.7
Registered electors		13,196		
Liberal Democrats hold		Swing	–4.0	

Meriden Tudor
Party	Candidate	Votes	%	±%
Liberal Democrats	Penelope Hill	1,165	40.0	–1.0
Reform	Mark Dixon	868	29.8	New
Conservative	Jennifer Raperport	390	13.4	–19.4
Labour	Keith Morgan	353	12.1	–14.1
Green	John Jowers	140	4.8	New
Majority		297	10.2	+2.0
Turnout		2,916	27.4	–5.3
Registered electors		10,675		
Liberal Democrats hold				

Nascot Park
Party	Candidate	Votes	%	±%
Liberal Democrats	Mark Watkin*	2,149	53.0	+2.1
Reform	John Craddock	735	18.1	New
Conservative	Stephen Woodard	540	13.3	–20.2
Labour	Minesh Pareek	381	9.4	–6.2
Green	Andrew Gallagher	253	6.2	New
Majority		1,414	34.9	+17.5
Turnout		4,058	31.2	–10.8
Registered electors		12,994		
Liberal Democrats hold				

North Watford
Party	Candidate	Votes	%	±%
Liberal Democrats	Richard Short	1,450	43.1	+12.1
Labour	Asif Khan*	926	27.5	–13.0
Reform	Xiaolei Xie	508	15.1	New
Conservative	Danny Mosley	244	7.2	–13.7
Green	Bruce Perry	167	5.0	+0.1
TUSC	Derek Foster	46	1.4	–0.1
Heritage	Sarah Knott	26	0.8	–0.5
Majority		524	15.6	
Turnout		3,367	27.2	–10.1
Registered electors		12,365		
Liberal Democrats gain from Labour		Swing	+12.6	

West Watford
Party	Candidate	Votes	%	±%
Labour	Nigel Bell*	1,323	37.3	–17.8
Liberal Democrats	Aga Dychton	1,193	33.6	+16.5
Reform	David Ealey	456	12.9	New
Conservative	Sanjaya Pant	314	8.9	–16.1
Green	David Gordon	215	6.1	New
TUSC	Mark O'Connor	47	1.3	–1.4
Majority		130	3.7	–26.4
Turnout		3,548	25.1	–8.5
Registered electors		14,162		
Labour hold		Swing	–17.2	

Woodside Stanborough
Party	Candidate	Votes	%	±%
Liberal Democrats	Tim Williams*	1,284	43.7	–6.3
Reform	Malcolm Caborn	945	32.1	New
Labour	Anne Joynes	303	10.3	–8.4
Conservative	Lola Adedoyin	287	9.8	–21.5
Green	Jake Mitchell	121	4.1	New
Majority		339	11.6	–7.1
Turnout		2,940	26.5	–4.7
Registered electors		11,092		
Liberal Democrats hold				

=== Welwyn Hatfield ===
The Borough of Welwyn Hatfield shown within Hertfordshire

Welwyn Hatfield district summary
Party	Seats	+/-	Votes	%	+/-
Conservative	2	▼5	6,864	26.9	–21.9
Reform UK	2	▲2	6,746	26.5	N/A
Liberal Democrats	3	▲2	5,511	21.6	–1.4
Labour	1	▲1	4,743	18.6	–7.1
Green	0	Steady	1,547	6.1	+4.2
TUSC	0	Steady	42	0.2	N/A
Heritage	0	Steady	25	0.1	N/A
Total	8	Steady	25,478	30.5	
Registered electors			83,532		

Division results

Haldens
Party	Candidate	Votes	%	±%
Liberal Democrats	Hillary Skoczylas	1,238	32.2	+2.2
Reform	John Redmond	942	24.5	New
Conservative	Durk Reyner	740	19.2	–22.2
Labour	Leo Gilbert	729	19.0	–9.7
Green	Lesley Smith	197	5.1	New
Majority		296	7.6	
Turnout		3,846	36.5	–3.3
Registered electors		10,544		
Liberal Democrats gain from Conservative				

Handside and Peartree
Party	Candidate	Votes	%	±%
Liberal Democrats	Gemma Moore	1,532	40.8	+2.4
Reform	Tom Holdsworth	845	22.5	New
Conservative	Jeet Dhelaria	622	16.6	−22.8
Labour	Darren Lewis	508	13.6	−8.6
Green	Phil Hopley	219	5.8	+5.8
TUSC	Mark Kerr	26	0.7	+0.7
Majority		687	18.3	
Turnout		3,752	31.2	–7.4
Registered electors		12,008		
Liberal Democrats gain from Conservative				

Hatfield East
Party	Candidate	Votes	%	±%
Reform	Michael Blissett	661	26.9	New
Labour	Vaishali Shah	612	24.9	–4.6
Conservative	David Rose	604	24.5	–19.9
Liberal Democrats	Helena Goldwater	384	15.6	–10.5
Green	Ian Gregory	179	7.3	New
TUSC	Mark Pickersgill	16	0.7	New
Majority		49	2.0	
Turnout		2,456	26.4	–3.7
Registered electors		9,292		
Reform gain from Conservative				

Hatfield North
Party	Candidate	Votes	%	±%
Labour	Beth Kelly	714	32.5	–7.9
Reform	Pete Whitehead	673	30.6	New
Conservative	Brian Seeger	440	20.0	–23.9
Liberal Democrats	Adam Edwards	239	10.9	+2.3
Green	Andreas Kukol	133	6.0	New
Majority		41	1.9	New
Turnout		2,199	21.7	–5.0
Registered electors		10,156		
Labour gain from Conservative				

Hatfield Rural
Party	Candidate	Votes	%	±%
Conservative	Fiona Thomson*	1,481	45.4	–29.0
Reform	Michael Southwell	998	30.6	New
Labour	Graham Beevers	341	10.4	–3.4
Liberal Democrats	Anthony Green	243	7.4	–4.4
Green	William Berrington	175	5.4	New
Heritage	Mia Americanos-Molinaro	25	0.8	New
Majority		483	14.8	–45.8
Turnout		3,263	33.6	+5.9
Registered electors		9,721		
Conservative hold				

Hatfield South
Party	Candidate	Votes	%	±%
Liberal Democrats	Paul Zukowskyj*	1,146	44.1	–0.5
Reform	Jane Johnson	638	24.5	New
Conservative	Teresa Travell	453	17.4	–17.5
Labour	Kamal Hussain	363	14.0	–6.5
Majority		508	19.5	+9.8
Turnout		2,600	27.8	–5.0
Registered electors		9,339		
Liberal Democrats hold				

Welwyn
Party	Candidate	Votes	%	±%
Conservative	Tony Kingsbury*	1,854	43.4	–14.2
Reform	Mark Smith	961	22.5	New
Labour	Andrew Osborne	597	14.0	–3.2
Liberal Democrats	Jacqueline Brennan	458	10.7	–2.7
Green	David Cox	405	9.5	–2.3
Majority		893	20.9	–19.5
Turnout		4,275	37.6	–3.2
Registered electors		11,368		
Conservative hold				

Welwyn Garden City South
Party	Candidate	Votes	%	±%
Reform	Mark Biddle	1,028	33.3	New
Labour	Anthony Toole	879	28.5	–12.6
Conservative	Marios Artemi*	670	21.7	–26.7
Liberal Democrats	Jean-Paul Skoczylas	271	8.8	–1.7
Green	Steve Iwasyk	239	7.7	New
Majority		149	4.8	
Turnout		3,087	27.9	–4.2
Registered electors		11,104		
Reform gain from Conservative				

== By-elections ==
Flamstead End and Turnford: 7 May 2026
Party	Candidate	Votes	%	±%
Conservative	Lesley Greensmyth	1,729	40.0	
Reform	Christopher Bush	1,530	35.0	
Green	Owen Brett	493	11.0	
Labour	Madeline McFadden	438	10.0	
Liberal Democrats	David Payne	147	3.0	
Majority		199		
Turnout		4,364	38.0	
Registered electors		11,478		
Conservative gain from Reform				

Letchworth North: 19 November 2026
Party	Candidate	Votes	%	±%
Labour	Laura Williams	1,186	36.7	+7.0
Conservative	Simon Bloxham	614	19.0	−3.3
Reform	Gary Warren	530	16.4	−9.2
Liberal Democrats	Claire Winchester	494	15.3	+3.4
Green	Brett Dietrich	258	8.0	−2.4
Restore	Neil Almond	149	4.6	N/A
Majority		572	17.7	+13.7
Turnout		3231	27.3	−5.1
Labour hold		Swing	+8.1	

== See also ==
- Hertfordshire County Council elections
