= Social Justice Party (UK) =

- Founded: 21 August 2023; 3 years ago
- Registered: 2 February 2024
- Split from: Labour Party
- Headquarters: Whitby, North Yorkshire
- Ideology: Democratic socialism Environmentalism
- Political position: Left-wing
- Colours: Red; Green
- Local government: 0 / 19,107

Website
- socialjusticeparty.uk

The Social Justice Party (SJP) was a left-wing minor political party in the United Kingdom. It was launched in August 2023 at a conference in Whitby, and was officially registered with the Electoral Commission on 2 February 2024.

The party voluntarily deregistered in December 2025, and can therefore no longer stand candidates.

== Description ==
The party was established by former members of the Labour Party, who resigned in protest at what they saw as the party’s "increasingly right-wing agenda" under the leadership of Keir Starmer.

The SJP describes itself as a "democratic socialist and environmentalist party", which believes that "common ownership and the democratic control of services and industry is the foundation for the achievement of a society guaranteeing every citizen’s right to the necessities of health care, housing, education, leisure and personal freedom."

== Representatives ==
The SJP gained its first councillor on North Yorkshire Council, when a councillor who had previously been a member of the Labour Party defected to the new party in February 2024. He resigned as a councillor in May 2025 for personal reasons.

On 23 March 2024, the party selected Asa Jones as its candidate for Scarborough and Whitby in the 2024 general election. He came seventh with 0.6% of the vote.

== See also ==
- Trade Unionist and Socialist Coalition
- Transform (political party)
- Your Party (UK)
- List of Labour Party breakaway parties (UK)
