= Breakthrough Party =

British political party

- Leader: Alex Mays
- Founder: Alex Mays
- Registered: 26 January 2021; 5 years ago
- Succeeded by: Transform Politics
- Headquarters: 151 The Rock, Bury, Greater Manchester, BL9 0ND
- Ideology: Democratic socialism
- Political position: Left-wing
- Colours: Orange; White

Website
- https://breakthroughparty.org.uk/

The Breakthrough Party was a minor political party in the United Kingdom. The party described itself as a "new home for those determined to disrupt the failed status quo and build an alternative: a society that uses its considerable wealth to provide dignity, security and justice for all". The party's constitution declared it to be a democratic socialist party. It was registered with the Electoral Commission in January 2021. In December 2023, the party announced that it will be dissolving and merging into Transform. Despite this, it is still registered as of August 2025.

== History ==
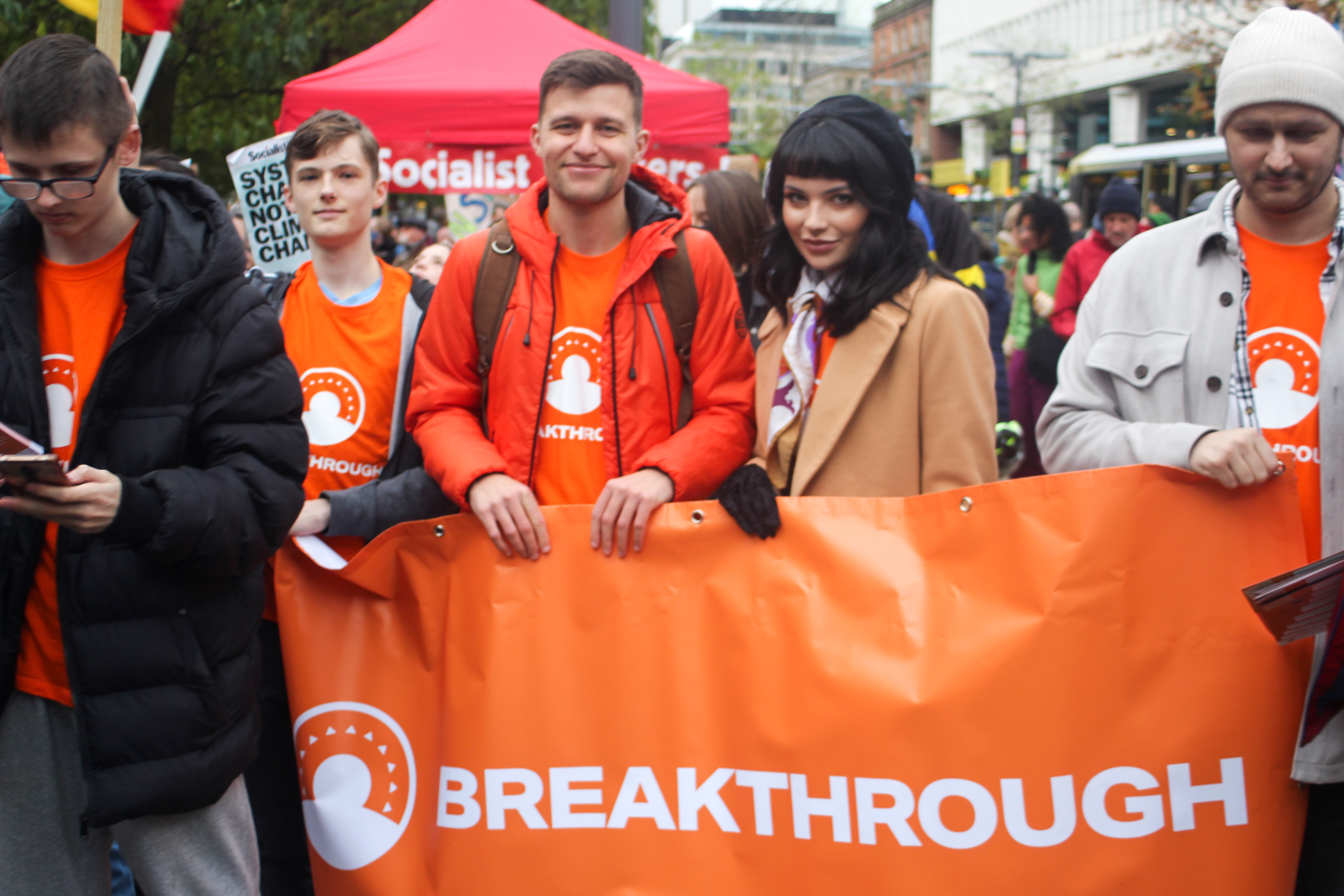
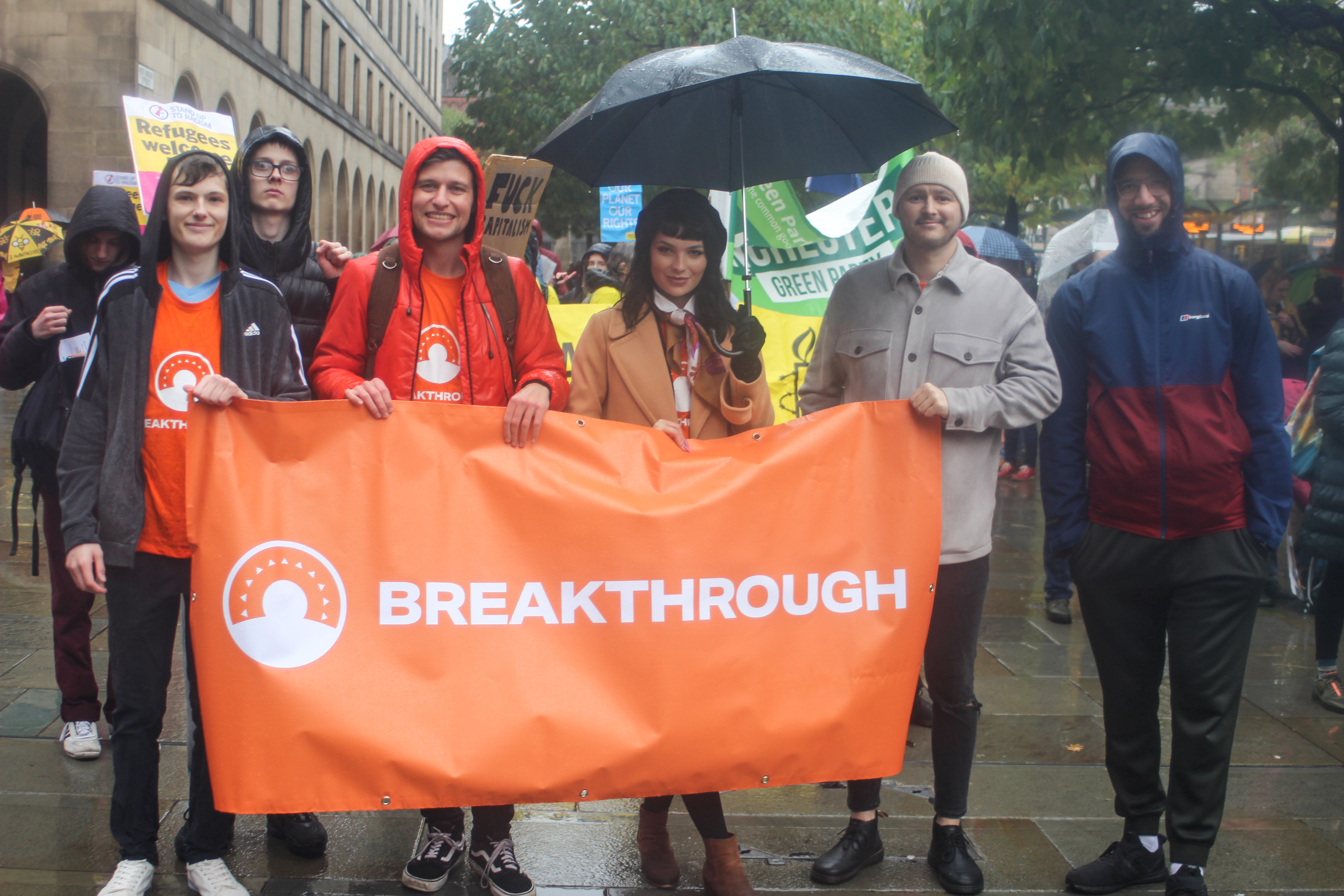
Breakthrough Party supporters on a Global Day of Action in Manchester on 6 November 2021

The Breakthrough Party was founded in 2021 by Alex Mays, a former member of the Labour Party, in response to the 2020 Labour Party leadership election.

On 20 January 2022, it was announced that a "memorandum of understanding" had been agreed between Breakthrough, the Northern Independence Party, the Trade Unionist and Socialist Coalition and Left Unity under the name Peoples Alliance of The Left (PAL) and organised by former Labour MP Thelma Walker. This alliance will work together on a future electoral strategy. On 29 January 2022, PAL came out in support of Dave Nellist's candidacy in the 2022 Birmingham Erdington by election.

On 15 May 2022, Oscar Wolf was appointed deputy leader of the party after elections triggered by the resignation of Sherilyn Wileman.

In mid August the party released their manifesto, covering a broad range of policy aims in community, democracy, economy, education, environment, equality, foreign policy, health, housing, immigration, independent living, justice, media, culture and sport, transport and work. The manifesto, titled a "minifesto" stated in its foreword "Our aim is simple: to offer a genuine alternative in a political landscape which is lurching further rightwards."

Towards the end of July 2023, a left-wing political party merger between Breakthrough, Left Unity, People's Alliance of the Left and Liverpool Community Independents under the name "Transform" was proposed. It was proposed in response to "an era of crisis" which the party merger proposal claims to be "a political organisation that offers a real solution" to. The party merger proposal also has 10 "core principles". If put forward, 5 left-wing parties will be merged.

== Elections and elected representatives ==
The party's first appearance on a ballot paper was in the 2021 Chesham and Amersham by-election, when Carla Gregory, a charity worker from the local area, stood. She received 197 votes, which represents 0.5 per cent of the vote.

On 8 March 2022, two borough councillors, Veena Siva and Jenny Vinson, originally elected for Labour on Spelthorne Borough Council had defected to the party, giving Breakthrough its first representation on a principal authority.

In the 2022 United Kingdom local elections two candidates stood for the Breakthrough Party: Nazma Meah in the Aston ward for the 2022 Birmingham City Council election and Ewan Chappell in the Penygroes ward for the 2022 Carmarthenshire County Council election. In the Aston ward in Birmingham, two seats were available; Nazma Meah, finished 5th out of 9 candidates with 265 votes, above both Conservative Party candidates. In the Penygroes seat of Carmarthenshire County Council, one seat was available and the party's candidate, Ewan Chappell, finished last of 4 candidates with 87 votes, equating to 9% of the vote.

On 19 April 2023, the party claimed that it had gained its eighth councillor. It was reported in the Wharfedale Observer on 25 April 2023 that the party has seven councillors in England. According to Open Council Data UK, none of these councillors belong to principal authorities.

== Policies ==
The party has ten core policies listed on its website: a £16 minimum wage (as of September 2022), scrapping zero hour contracts and banning "fire and rehire", "renationalisation of the NHS and social care", "genuinely affordable housing, for need not profit", limiting rents to 30 per cent of local income and an end to no-fault evictions, a universal basic income, "publicly owned utilities, transport and broadband", defence of the right to protest, "stand in solidarity with marginalised communities", an effort to "collaborate across borders to build a global Green New Deal", and proportional representation.

== Transform ==
On 24 July 2023, the Breakthrough Party, alongside Left Unity, the Liverpool Community Independents, and the People's Alliance of the Left issued a joint statement calling for a "new party of the left" in Britain. Citing Labour Party support for policies such as the two-child benefit cap and tuition fees, as well as Labour leader, Keir Starmer's refusal to publicly support striking workers. The group, calling themselves Transform, urged those who agree with their core principles to "move rapidly towards founding a new party of the left."

According to Transform's website, the joint statement was endorsed by figures such as Ian Hodson, National President of the Bakers, Food and Allied Workers Union (BFAWU); Thelma Walker, former Labour MP for Colne Valley; and broadcaster and journalist, India Willoughby.

== See also ==
- List of Labour Party breakaway parties (UK)
- Your Party (UK)
