= Transform (political party) =

- Leader: Collective leadership
- Governing body: Transform Council (TC)
- Spokespersons: Solma Ahmed; Alan Gibbons; Fiona Grace
- Founded: 25 November 2023; 2 years ago
- Dissolved: December 2025
- Merger of: Breakthrough Party; People's Alliance of the Left
- Merged into: Your Party
- Headquarters: 5 Caledonian Road, London, N1 9DX
- Ideology: Progressivism
- Political position: Left-wing
- Affiliates: Left Unity; Liverpool Community Independents
- Colours: Pink

Website
- https://transformpolitics.uk/

The Transform Party, also known as Transform Politics, or simply Transform, was a political party active in Great Britain. A merger of two political groups, the Breakthrough Party and the People's Alliance of the Left, Transform aimed to build a new left-wing political party to challenge both the Conservative Party and the Labour Party. The party was also associated with the Liverpool Community Independents and Left Unity, who remained independent parties.

== History ==
On 24 July 2023, Transform launched, with backing from Maia Thomas, who previously set up a Black Lives Matter group in Exeter. The party claim to "fill a socialist void" left by Labour, as members believed it is moving "too far right" under Keir Starmer's leadership. In August, they received support from trans activist, India Willoughby. It was officially founded as a party on 25 November in Nottingham, where they held an inaugural conference. They garnered further support from Romayne Phoenix, former co-chair of the People’s Assembly, Solma Ahmed, former member of Labour Women's Committee and Momentum’s National Coordinating Group, Ian Hodson, the National President of BFAWU, former Labour MP Thelma Walker, Derek Wall, ecosocialist writer and former principal speaker of the Green Party and Nerea Fernandez Cordero, spokesperson of United Left in Spain and a member of the executive board of the European Left, among others.

In December, independent King's Lynn councillor Jo Rust confirmed that she had joined the party, though she continued to sit as an independent on the council.

Transform announced three candidates for the 2024 general election: in Bishop Auckland and Newton Aycliffe and Spennymoor under the Transform banner and in Liverpool Garston under the Liverpool Independents banner. They also published a "Left List" of left-wing candidates throughout the country who were endorsed by the party, which included independent candidates such as Andrew Feinstein, former Labour leader Jeremy Corbyn and some candidates from the Green Party.

Transform ran a single candidate in the 2025 local elections, in the Hemel Hempstead Town division of Hertfordshire County Council. Their candidate received 33 votes out of 3,535 total votes cast in the division (0.9%).

In October 2025, the party's leadership announced their intention to host a special conference with the aim of dissolving the organisation, which in December 2025 voted in favour of dissolution and a merger with the newly established Your Party.

== Election results ==
=== General elections ===
Election	Candidate	Constituency	Votes	%		Government
2024	Rachel Maughan	Bishop Auckland	331	0.8		Labour
2024	Brian Agar	Newton Aycliffe and Spennymoor	264	0.7		Labour
2024	Sam Gorst (Note: Stood under the banner of the Liverpool Community Independents)	Liverpool Garston	3,294	7.8		Labour
2024		Total	Votes	%	Seats won	Labour
2024		Total	595	0.0%	0	Labour

==== Endorsements (2024 general election) ====
- Chorley Martin Powell-Davies
- Coventry East Dave Nellist
- Crawley Robin Burnham
- Croydon West Donna Murray-Turner
- Dewsbury & Batley Iqbal Mohamed
- Doncaster North Andy Hiles
- Dudley Shakeela Bibi
- Dundee Central Jim McFarlane
- East Ham Tahir Mirza
- Edmonton & Winchmore Hill Khalid Sadur
- Enfield North Ertan Karpazli
- Exeter Willy Poulter
- Feltham & Heston Damian Read
- Gateshead Central & Whickham Norman Hall
- Glasgow North East Chris Sermanni
- Glasgow South Brian Smith
- Grantham & Bourne Charmaine Dawn Morgan
- Great Grimsby & Cleethorpes Mark Patrick Gee
- Harrow West Pamela Fitzpatrick
- Heywood & Middleton North Chris Furlong
- Holborn & St Pancras Andrew Feinstein
- Hove & Portslade Tanushka Marah
- Ilford North Leanne Mohamad
- Islington North Jeremy Corbyn
- Islington South & Finsbury Ethan Saunders
- Kensington & Bayswater Emma Dent Coad
- Leeds Central & Headingley Louie Fulton
- Leeds North East Mike Davies
- Leicester East Claudia Webbe
- Leicester South Shockat Adam
- Leicester West Steve Score
- Lewisham North John Lloyd
- Leyton & Wanstead Shanell Johnson
- Liverpool Garston Sam Gorst
- Liverpool Wavertree Ann San
- Luton North Toqueer Shah
- Luton South & South Bedfordshire Attiq Ahmed Malik
- Manchester Central Ekua Bayunu
- Mid Cheshire Helen Clawson
- Monmouthshire Owen Lewis
- Newton Aycliffe & Spennymoor Brian Agar
- Northampton South Katie Simpson
- Oxford East Jabu Nala-Hartley
- Preston Michael Lavelette
- Reading Central Adam Wayne Joseph Gillman
- Scarborough & Whitby Asa Joe Benjamin Jones
- Sheffield Brightside & Hillsborough Maxine Bowler
- Sheffield Central Isabelle Amy France
- Sheffield Heeley Mick Suter
- Slough Azhar Iqbal Chohan
- South Dorset Giovanna Lewis
- South West Devon Ben Davy
- South West Wiltshire Thomas Culshaw
- Southampton Itchen Declan Peter Clune
- Southampton Test Maggie Fricker
- Southgate & Wood Green Karl Vidol
- Southport Sean Halsall
- St Neots & Mid Cambridgeshire Stephen Ferguson
- Stratford & Bow Fiona Lali
- Swansea West Gareth Bromhall
- Swindon North Scott Victor Abbas Hunter
- Tottenham Nandita Lal
- Tunbridge Wells Hassan Kassem
- Uxbridge & South Ruislip Gary Lee Harbord
- Walsall & Bloxwich Aftab Nawaz
- Warrington North Maddison Wheeldon
- West Ham & Beckton Sophia Naqvi
- Wigan Jan Cunliffe
- Worcester Mark Patrick Davies
- Wycombe Ajaz Rehman

=== Local elections ===
Election	Candidate	Ward	Votes	%
2024	Jackson Caines	Junction	550	28.26
2025	Gary Ruff	Hemel Hempstead Town	33	0.9

== See also ==
- Social Justice Party (UK)
- Trade Unionist and Socialist Coalition
