= 2011 Bath and North East Somerset Council election =

2011 UK local government election

← 2007	5 May 2011	2015 →

All 65 seats to Bath and North East Somerset Council 33 seats needed for a majority
	First party	Second party
	Con	LD
Party	Conservative	Liberal Democrats
Last election	31 seats, 43.2%	26 seats, 32.5%
Seats won	29	29
Seat change	▼2	▲3
Popular vote	41,558	39,181
Percentage	36.9%	34.8%
Swing	▼6.3%	▲2.3%
	Third party	Fourth party
	Lab	Ind
Party	Labour	Independent
Last election	5 seats, 11.1%	3 seats, 7.0%
Seats won	5	2
Seat change	Steady	▼1
Popular vote	20,151	4,033
Percentage	17.9%	3.6%
Swing	▲6.8%	▼3.4%
- Map showing the composition of Bath and North East Somerset Council following the election. Blue showing Conservative, Red showing Labour, Yellow showing Liberal Democrats, and Grey showing Independents. Striped wards have mixed representation.
Council control before election
No overall control (Con minority)
Council control after election
No overall control (Lib Dem minority)

The 2011 Bath and North East Somerset Council election was held on 5 May 2011 to elect 65 local councillors for Bath and North East Somerset Council. Following the election, a minority Liberal Democrat administration was formed. Cllr Paul Crossley became leader of the council.

== Election results ==
Bath and North East Somerset Council election, 2011
Party	Candidates						Votes		
Party	Stood	Elected	Gained	Unseated	Net	% of total	%	No.	Net %
Conservative	65	29	1	3	▼2	44.6%	36.9%	41,558	▼6.3%
Liberal Democrats	65	29	4	1	▲3	44.6%	34.8%	39,181	▲2.3%
Labour	48	5	1	1	Steady	7.7%	17.9%	20,151	▲6.8%
Independent	11	2	1	2	▼1	3.1%	3.6%	4,033	▼3.4%
Green	21	0	0	0	Steady	0%	6.7%	7,557	▲0.8%
UKIP	1	0	0	0	Steady	0%	0.1%	94	N/A

== Ward results ==
The ward results listed below are based on the changes from the 2007 elections, not taking into account any party defections or by-elections. Sitting councillors are marked with an asterisk (*).

=== Abbey ===
Abbey (2 seats)
Party	Candidate	Votes	%	±%
Liberal Democrats	Manda Rigby	773	34.4	+1.6
Conservative	Brian John Webber *	716	31.9	–5.8
Liberal Democrats	Jay Oliver Risbridger	662	–	
Conservative	Gladys Pek Yue MacRae	646	–	
Green	Ian James Martin	436	19.4	+1.5
Labour	Adrian Bateman	323	14.4	N/A
Turnout		1,957	44.2	
Registered electors		4,427		
Liberal Democrats gain from Conservative		Swing		
Conservative hold		Swing		

=== Bathavon North ===
Bathavon North (3 seats)
Party	Candidate	Votes	%	±%
Conservative	Gabriel Michael Batt *	1,423	37.2	–14.1
Conservative	Martin Beresford John Veal *	1,408	–	
Conservative	Geoff Ward	1,289	–	
Liberal Democrats	Alison Millar	1,237	32.4	+13.6
Liberal Democrats	Eve Strasburger	855	–	
Liberal Democrats	Charlotte Moore	826	–	
Labour	Anne Brown	591	15.5	+3.8
Green	Justin Christopher Temblett-Wood	572	15.0	–2.5
Labour	Derek William Brown	567	–	
Turnout		3,343	57.2	
Registered electors		5,845		
Conservative hold		Swing		
Conservative hold		Swing		
Conservative hold		Swing		

=== Bathavon South ===
Bathavon South
Party	Candidate	Votes	%	±%
Liberal Democrats	Neil Butters *	680	49.3	+3.5
Conservative	Harvey Haeberling	478	34.7	+1.0
Labour	David Walter Lavington	116	8.4	N/A
Green	Hugh Golden Prentice	105	7.6	–9.6
Majority		202	14.6	
Turnout		1,388	62.1	
Registered electors		2,236		
Liberal Democrats hold		Swing		

=== Bathavon West ===
Bathavon West
Party	Candidate	Votes	%	±%
Conservative	David John Veale	493	53.0	–1.3
Liberal Democrats	Louise Bray	437	47.0	+1.3
Majority		56	6.0	
Turnout		951	47.8	
Registered electors		1,991		
Conservative hold		Swing		

=== Bathwick ===
Bathwick (2 seats)
Party	Candidate	Votes	%	±%
Liberal Democrats	Nicholas John Coombes *	740	47.0	+10.3
Liberal Democrats	David John Martin	657	–	
Conservative	Tony Hickman	528	33.5	–3.1
Conservative	Johnny Kidney	528	–	
Green	Katharine Anne Miles	155	9.8	–0.8
Labour	Peter Marsh	153	9.7	+5.6
Green	Jenny Rust	124	–	
Turnout		1,520	35.2	
Registered electors		4,319		
Liberal Democrats hold		Swing		
Liberal Democrats hold		Swing		

=== Chew Valley North ===
Chew Valley North
Party	Candidate	Votes	%	±%
Conservative	Malcolm Charles Hanney *	672	73.8	–10.0
Liberal Democrats	Nicholas John Evan Roberts	122	13.4	–2.8
Labour	Hattie Ajderian	117	12.8	N/A
Majority		550	60.4	
Turnout		921	47.9	
Registered electors		1,922		
Conservative hold		Swing		

=== Chew Valley South ===
Chew Valley South
Party	Candidate	Votes	%	±%
Conservative	Victor Lewis Pritchard *	451	52.2	–20.7
Liberal Democrats	Charles Fenn	154	17.8	–9.3
Independent	John Kenyon Knibbs	132	15.3	N/A
Labour	Susan Irene Thorne	127	14.7	N/A
Majority		297	34.4	
Turnout		868	45.2	
Registered electors		1,919		
Conservative hold		Swing		

=== Clutton ===
Clutton
Party	Candidate	Votes	%	±%
Liberal Democrats	Jeremy Sparks	568	52.6	+35.2
Conservative	Steve Willcox *	511	47.4	–15.0
Majority		57	5.1	
Turnout		1,113	56.9	
Registered electors		1,955		
Liberal Democrats gain from Conservative		Swing		

=== Combe Down ===
Combe Down (2 seats)
Party	Candidate	Votes	%	±%
Liberal Democrats	Roger Alan Symonds *	1,052	46.2	–4.5
Liberal Democrats	Cherry Elizabeth Beath *	1,042	–	
Conservative	Robin Henderson Kirkland	567	24.9	–9.9
Conservative	Glenys Chalker	564	–	
Green	Giles Oliver Malcolm Green	317	13.9	–0.8
Labour	Jane Bigham	283	12.4	N/A
Independent	Kevin Russell	59	2.6	N/A
Turnout		2,180	53.2	
Registered electors		4,099		
Liberal Democrats hold		Swing		
Liberal Democrats hold		Swing		

=== Farmborough ===
Farmborough
Party	Candidate	Votes	%	±%
Conservative	Sally Davis *	861	71.8	–2.4
Liberal Democrats	Adrian Dobinson	228	19.0	+10.3
Labour	Sarah Louise Pryer	110	9.2	–7.9
Majority		633	52.8	
Turnout		1,209	57.2	
Registered electors		2,113		
Conservative hold		Swing		

=== High Littleton ===
High Littleton
Party	Candidate	Votes	%	±%
Conservative	Les Kew *	742	61.7	–9.1
Labour	Roger Baber	308	26.0	+8.7
Liberal Democrats	Frank Blades	153	12.7	+0.8
Majority		434	36.1	
Turnout		1,211	50.0	
Registered electors		2,420		
Conservative hold		Swing		

=== Keynsham East ===
Keynsham East (2 seats)
Party	Candidate	Votes	%	±%
Conservative	Bryan Organ *	1,310	52.5	+3.9
Conservative	Marie Longstaff *	1,138	–	
Liberal Democrats	Andy Wait	622	24.9	+3.9
Labour	Steve Rossiter	565	22.6	+12.8
Liberal Democrats	Roger Martin Clark	528	–	
Turnout		2,393	54.3	
Registered electors		4,408		
Conservative hold		Swing		
Conservative hold		Swing		

Marie Longstaff was previously elected under her maiden name Marie Brewer

=== Keynsham North ===
Keynsham North (2 seats)
Party	Candidate	Votes	%	±%
Conservative	Charles Daniel Gerrish *	1,174	56.9	+3.4
Conservative	Brian Simmons *	913	–	
Labour	Luke Hobbs	545	26.4	+4.7
Liberal Democrats	Keith Richard Kirwan	344	16.7	+3.9
Labour	Michael Evans	330	–	
Liberal Democrats	Angela Godfrey	203	–	
Turnout		1,984	48.7	
Registered electors		4,076		
Conservative hold		Swing		
Conservative hold		Swing		

=== Keynsham South ===
Keynsham South (2 seats)
Party	Candidate	Votes	%	±%
Conservative	Alan Dudley Hale *	824	44.8	+14.3
Conservative	Kate Simmons	640	–	
Labour	Paul Rabbeth	600	32.6	–3.9
Labour	Keith Burchell	595	–	
Liberal Democrats	Tony Crouch	416	22.6	+0.1
Liberal Democrats	Sam Lawes	228	–	
Turnout		1,796	46.2	
Registered electors		3,891		
Conservative gain from Labour		Swing		
Conservative hold		Swing		

=== Kingsmead ===
Kingsmead (2 seats)
Party	Candidate	Votes	%	±%
Liberal Democrats	Andrew Furse *	924	40.0	–4.9
Liberal Democrats	Douglas Nicol	620	–	
Conservative	Carol Anne Paradise *	469	20.3	–8.6
Green	Eric Lucas	457	19.8	–0.5
Conservative	Anthony Bernard Masters	417	–	
Labour	Pam Richards	367	15.9	N/A
UKIP	Michael Stanley	94	4.1	N/A
Turnout		1,853	44.9	
Registered electors		4,125		
Liberal Democrats hold		Swing		
Liberal Democrats hold		Swing		

=== Lambridge ===
Lambridge (2 seats)
Party	Candidate	Votes	%	±%
Conservative	Bryan Alan Chalker *	871	32.4	–6.8
Conservative	Dave Laming	719	–	
Liberal Democrats	Quil Cantrell	617	23.0	–8.1
Labour	Bernard Morgan	605	22.5	+14.1
Green	Thelma Vivian Grimes	593	22.1	+0.8
Liberal Democrats	Raine Cantrell	587	–	
Turnout		2,339	55.5	
Registered electors		4,215		
Conservative hold		Swing		
Conservative hold		Swing		

=== Lansdown ===
Lansdown (2 seats)
Party	Candidate	Votes	%	±%
Conservative	Patrick Anketell-Jones	1,018	48.0	–19.5
Conservative	Tony Clarke *	888	–	
Green	David Kevin Naismith	378	17.8	N/A
Liberal Democrats	Cherry Joan Shelton-Mills	378	17.8	–14.7
Liberal Democrats	Jeremy Thomas Francis Hime	354	–	
Labour	Philip McCabe	289	13.6	N/A
Independent	Allison Margaret Derrick	59	2.8	N/A
Turnout		1,872	52.6	
Registered electors		3,561		
Conservative hold		Swing		
Conservative hold		Swing		

=== Lyncombe ===
Lyncombe (2 seats)
Party	Candidate	Votes	%	±%
Liberal Democrats	David Bellotti *	1,353	43.8	+6.6
Liberal Democrats	Katie Hall	1,095	–	
Conservative	Liz Dodgson	841	27.2	–6.4
Conservative	Ben Robinson	748	–	
Green	Donald Patrick Grimes	512	16.6	+1.1
Labour	Julian Vincent	383	12.4	N/A
Turnout		2,737	60.6	
Registered electors		4,518		
Liberal Democrats hold		Swing		
Liberal Democrats hold		Swing		

=== Mendip ===
Mendip
Party	Candidate	Votes	%	±%
Conservative	Tim Warren *	646	57.7	–8.3
Labour	Tim Thorne	226	20.2	–6.9
Green	Michael Edwin Jay	143	12.8	+0.5
Liberal Democrats	Benjamin Goldstrom	104	9.3	+1.0
Majority		420	37.5	
Turnout		1,128	53.6	
Registered electors		2,106		
Conservative hold		Swing		

=== Midsomer Norton North ===
Midsomer Norton North (2 seats)
Party	Candidate	Votes	%	±%
Conservative	Michael Evans	849	47.6	+4.5
Conservative	Barry Macrae *	787	–	
Labour Co-op	Gael Doswell	649	36.4	+1.0
Labour Co-op	Fflyff McLaren	631	–	
Liberal Democrats	Michael Jakins	285	16.0	–7.5
Liberal Democrats	Tim Bray	231	–	
Turnout		1,860	40.8	
Registered electors		4,563		
Conservative hold		Swing		
Conservative hold		Swing		

=== Midsomer Norton Redfield ===
Midsomer Norton Redfield (2 seats)
Party	Candidate	Votes	%	±%
Conservative	Paul Myers	996	55.0	+11.9
Conservative	Chris Watt *	903	–	
Labour Co-op	Wayne Teall	641	35.4	+2.0
Labour Co-op	Peter Sas	545	–	
Liberal Democrats	Dennis Tickell	173	9.6	–13.9
Liberal Democrats	Allan Richard Crossley	159	–	
Turnout		1,870	44.8	
Registered electors		4,171		
Conservative hold		Swing		
Conservative hold		Swing		

=== Newbridge ===
Newbridge (2 seats)
Party	Candidate	Votes	%	±%
Liberal Democrats	Loraine Brinkhurst *	1,246	43.7	–9.5
Liberal Democrats	Caroline Roberts *	1,146	–	
Conservative	Mike Clarkson	727	25.5	–21.2
Conservative	Dan Hogston	688	–	
Labour	Jo McCarron	513	18.0	N/A
Green	Gavin Alexander Withers	364	12.8	N/A
Turnout		2,541	57.3	
Registered electors		4,437		
Liberal Democrats hold		Swing		
Liberal Democrats hold		Swing		

=== Odd Down ===
Odd Down (2 seats)
Party	Candidate	Votes	%	±%
Liberal Democrats	Steve Hedges *	1,016	48.0	+3.5
Liberal Democrats	Nigel Roberts *	858	–	
Labour	Liz Vincent	381	18.0	+6.9
Conservative	Nicolas de Larrinaga	378	17.8	–9.9
Green	Dominic Barrington Tristram	343	16.2	N/A
Conservative	Meredith Alun Lloyd	328	–	
Turnout		1,920	44.9	
Registered electors		4,280		
Liberal Democrats hold		Swing		
Liberal Democrats hold		Swing		

=== Oldfield ===
Oldfield (2 seats)
Party	Candidate	Votes	%	±%
Liberal Democrats	Will Sandry *	782	43.4	–6.1
Liberal Democrats	David Christopher Dixon *	690	–	
Labour	Hilary Fraser	380	21.1	+9.8
Labour	Roger Chapman	378	–	
Green	David Beasley	333	18.5	N/A
Conservative	Jonathan Peter Grinham	308	17.1	–1.9
Conservative	Jack Whalley	300	–	
Turnout		1,772	38.0	
Registered electors		4,661		
Liberal Democrats hold		Swing		
Liberal Democrats hold		Swing		

=== Paulton ===
Paulton (2 seats)
Party	Candidate	Votes	%	±%
Labour	John Anthony Bull *	787	45.3	+4.4
Labour	Liz Hardman	785	–	
Conservative	Mike Colliver	616	35.5	–0.8
Conservative	Stephen John Goodwin	432	–	
Liberal Democrats	Debby Tarrant	333	19.2	+3.6
Liberal Democrats	Adam Taylor	293	–	
Turnout		1,764	42.4	
Registered electors		4,165		
Labour hold		Swing		
Labour hold		Swing		

=== Peasedown ===
Peasedown (2 seats)
Party	Candidate	Votes	%	±%
Liberal Democrats	Nathan Hartley *	1,172	54.2	+12.2
Liberal Democrats	Sarah Frances Bevan *	1,149	–	
Labour	Guy Matthews	361	16.7	+2.2
Independent	Robert William George Butt	360	–	
Independent	Kathy Thomas	288	–	
Independent	Jonathan Paul Rich	287	–	
Conservative	Margaret Rose Brewer	268	12.4	–1.4
Labour	Anne Marie Jovic-Sas	252	–	
Conservative	Deirdre Mary Horstmann	238	–	
Turnout		2,321	47.5	
Registered electors		4,884		
Liberal Democrats hold		Swing		
Liberal Democrats hold		Swing		

=== Publow with Whitchurch ===
Publow with Whitchurch
Party	Candidate	Votes	%	±%
Conservative	Peter Michael John Edwards *	664	72.1	–2.5
Labour	Roy Staddon	184	20.6	+11.5
Liberal Democrats	Anna Beria	65	7.3	–9.0
Majority		460	51.5	
Turnout		904	46.5	
Registered electors		1,944		
Conservative hold		Swing		

=== Radstock ===
Radstock (2 seats)
Party	Candidate	Votes	%	±%
Liberal Democrats	Simon George Allen *	799	44.2	N/A
Labour Co-op	Eleanor Margaret Jackson *	711	39.3	+7.4
Labour Co-op	Lesley Mansell	639	–	
Liberal Democrats	Gabby Durham	551	–	
Conservative	Michael Cobb	299	16.5	+0.2
Conservative	Carole Diane Fitzpatrick	250	–	
Turnout		1,822	44.2	
Registered electors		4,122		
Liberal Democrats gain from Independent		Swing		
Labour Co-op hold		Swing		

=== Saltford ===
Saltford (2 seats)
Party	Candidate	Votes	%	±%
Conservative	Francine Haeberling *	932	44.5	–6.5
Conservative	Mathew Blankley	894	–	
Independent	Reg Williams	596	28.5	+6.7
Labour	Michael John Tucker	293	14.0	+4.4
Liberal Democrats	Raymond Buchanan	273	13.0	–4.6
Labour	Elizabeth Anne Derl-Davis	258	–	
Liberal Democrats	Daniel Robert Walker	83	–	
Turnout		1,874	55.9	
Registered electors		3,353		
Conservative hold		Swing		
Conservative hold		Swing		

=== Southdown ===
Southdown (2 seats)
Party	Candidate	Votes	%	±%
Liberal Democrats	Paul Crossley *	863	45.3	+1.1
Liberal Democrats	Dine Romero *	803	–	
Labour	Keith Franklin	402	21.1	N/A
Conservative	Dan Warren	323	17.0	–12.5
Green	Natalie Valentina Davis	315	16.6	–9.6
Conservative	Peter Gordon Till	272	–	
Turnout		1,809	60.7	
Registered electors		4,308		
Liberal Democrats hold		Swing		
Liberal Democrats hold		Swing		

=== Timsbury ===
Timsbury
Party	Candidate	Votes	%	±%
Independent	Douglas Deacon *	852	68.9	+33.1
Labour Co-op	Will Parbury	189	15.3	–17.1
Conservative	Michael Green	148	12.0	–15.9
Liberal Democrats	Robert James Attword	48	3.9	–0.1
Majority		663	53.6	
Turnout		1,239	58.3	
Registered electors		2,127		
Independent hold		Swing		

=== Twerton ===
Twerton (2 seats)
Party	Candidate	Votes	%	±%
Liberal Democrats	Tim Ball *	757	54.3	–13.1
Liberal Democrats	Gerry Curran *	525	–	
Labour	Steve Cope	254	18.2	N/A
Conservative	John Palmer	234	16.8	+15.8
Labour	Sanjeev Chaddha	220	–	
Conservative	Gay Tulyholowycz	153	–	
Green	Justin Lee-Gammage	150	10.8	N/A
Turnout		1,333	35.0	
Registered electors		3,804		
Liberal Democrats hold		Swing		
Liberal Democrats hold		Swing		

=== Walcot ===
Walcot (2 seats)
Party	Candidate	Votes	%	±%
Liberal Democrats	Lisa Jane Brett	1,144	38.7	+2.4
Liberal Democrats	Paul Jonathan Fox	914	–	
Green	Nicholas Hales	755	25.5	+1.7
Labour	Steve Bendle	599	20.3	+10.8
Conservative	Joy Goldsmith	459	15.5	+14.9
Conservative	Mandana Sharifi	383	–	
Turnout		2,411	54.6	
Registered electors		4,414		
Liberal Democrats hold		Swing		
Liberal Democrats hold		Swing		

=== Westfield ===
Westfield (2 seats)
Party	Candidate	Votes	%	±%
Labour	Rob Appleyard *	971	51.5	+11.1
Labour	Robin Moss	651	–	
Independent	Sue Hamilton	514	27.1	N/A
Independent	Eddie Newman	321	–	
Conservative	Monica Evans	291	15.3	+0.8
Conservative	Clive Fricker	212	–	
Liberal Democrats	Catherine Whybrow	123	6.5	+1.1
Liberal Democrats	Lesley Clarke	98	–	
Turnout		1,756	39.8	
Registered electors		4,409		
Labour hold		Swing		
Labour gain from Independent		Swing		

=== Westmoreland ===
Westmoreland (2 seats)
Party	Candidate	Votes	%	±%
Independent	June Player	565	28.9	N/A
Liberal Democrats	Sharon Grace Ball *	549	28.1	–3.0
Liberal Democrats	Matt Hemsley	512	–	
Green	Jon Lucas	349	17.8	–8.7
Green	Nigel David Williams	312	–	
Labour	David Halpin	286	14.6	–0.7
Labour	Hadleigh Roberts	231	–	
Conservative	Mike Ringham	208	10.6	–16.5
Conservative	Lance Payton	200	–	
Turnout		1,898	37.8	
Registered electors		5,024		
Independent gain from Liberal Democrats		Swing		
Liberal Democrats hold		Swing		

=== Weston ===
Weston (2 seats)
Party	Candidate	Votes	%	±%
Conservative	Colin Vincent Barrett *	1,187	47.2	–15.2
Conservative	Malcolm John Henry Lees *	963	–	
Liberal Democrats	Michelle Drew	524	20.8	–16.8
Liberal Democrats	Michelle Anne O'Doherty	495	–	
Labour	Vicky Drew	419	16.7	N/A
Green	Lisa Loveridge	384	15.3	N/A
Turnout		2,276	56.0	
Registered electors		4,062		
Conservative hold		Swing		
Conservative hold		Swing		

=== Widcombe ===
Widcombe (2 seats)
Party	Candidate	Votes	%	±%
Liberal Democrats	Ian Andrew Gilchrist *	1,106	44.1	+12.7
Liberal Democrats	Ben Stevens	857	–	
Conservative	Peter John Martin	613	24.4	–6.6
Conservative	Don Wallace	562	–	
Green	Susan Patricia Bradley	460	18.3	+3.5
Labour	Saiful Islam	331	13.2	+6.8
Turnout		2,146	47.7	
Registered electors		4,502		
Liberal Democrats hold		Swing		
Liberal Democrats gain from Conservative		Swing		

== By-elections between 2011 and 2015 ==
=== Chew Valley North ===
Chew Valley North By-Election 15 November 2012
Party	Candidate	Votes	%	±%
Conservative	Liz Richardson	417	50.9	–22.9
Liberal Democrats	Charles Fenn	271	33.0	+19.7
Independent	Andrew Christopher Tanner	106	12.9	N/A
Green	Michael Edwin Jay	26	3.2	N/A
Majority		146	17.8	
Turnout		822	42.2	
Registered electors		1,950		
Conservative hold		Swing		

=== Bathavon North ===
Bathavon North By-Election 22 May 2014
Party	Candidate	Votes	%	±%
Conservative	Terry Gazzard	1,047	37.6	+0.4
Liberal Democrats	Dorian Ross Williams Baker	712	25.6	–6.8
Labour	George Aylett	353	12.7	–2.8
Green	Justin Christopher Temblett-Wood	353	12.7	–2.3
UKIP	Hugo Jenks	316	11.4	N/A
Majority		335	12.1	
Turnout		2,781	46.9	
Conservative hold		Swing		
