= Left Unity (UK) =

- Principal Speakers: Sharon McCourt; Felicity Dowling; Nick Jones
- National Secretary: Felicity Dowling
- Founded: 30 November 2013
- Membership (April 2026): ▼ <250
- Ideology: Eco-socialism; Anti-capitalism; Environmentalism; Feminism; Pro-Europeanism
- Political position: Left-wing
- National affiliation: People's Alliance of The Left
- European affiliation: Party of the European Left (associated member)
- Colours: Red Green Black

Website
- leftunity.org

Left Unity is a left-wing political party in the United Kingdom founded in 2013 when film director and social campaigner Ken Loach appealed for a new party to replace the Labour Party (which according to him failed to oppose the United Kingdom government austerity programme and had shifted towards neoliberalism). More than 10,000 people supported Loach's appeal.

In 2014, the party had 2,000 members and 70 branches across Britain. The organisation is affiliated at European level with the Party of the European Left.

== Ideology ==
The party's primary aim is the following:

... unite the diverse strands of radical and socialist politics in the UK including workers' organisations and trade unions; ordinary people, grass root organisations and co-operatives rooted in our neighbourhoods and communities; individuals and communities facing poverty, discrimination and social oppression because of gender, ethnicity, age, disability, sexuality, unemployment or under-employment; environmental and green campaigners; campaigners for freedom and democracy; all those who seek to authentically voice and represent the interests of ordinary working people.

— Left Unity, Party constitution

Left Unity was founded by Ken Loach, who believed that there was an "absence of a strong voice on the left" and that "the Greens are alone among the political parties in not standing up for the interests of big business". Loach wanted a "UKIP of the left", "a successful party to the left of Labour as UKIP appears to be a successful party to the right of the Tories".

=== Economics ===
Left Unity is an anti-capitalist party, firmly opposed to "austerity programmes which make the mass of working people, the old, the young and the sick, pay for a systemic crisis of capitalism" and believes that such measures protect bankers and not ordinary people. According to Loach, "an anti-austerity alliance is good, but the problem with [the Scottish National Party, Plaid Cymru and the Green Party is that] they're mainly social democratic parties". Nick Eardley wrote for BBC News: "Parties like his are needed to peddle a more radical message".

Left Unity wants to end zero-hour contracts and the privatisation of public services in education and health. The party advocates common ownership and democratic control of "the means of producing wealth" and the reversal of what it sees as 30 years of neoliberalism, aiming to "build international networks of solidarity to support any government introducing such measures within Europe and elsewhere". It supports full employment "through measures such as reduced working hours for all; spending on public housing, infrastructure and services; and the public ownership of, and democratic collective control over, basic utilities, transport systems and the financial sector" and opposes "the casualization of employment conditions and laws which restrict the right of workers to organise effectively and take industrial action".

The party has been criticised by far-left political organisations who say that the party has a "commitment to govern within the framework of capitalism" and its economic programme "is a left-Keynesian, reformist programme, which would leave more than half of the FTSE 100 companies still in private hands, despite phrases in it about a "strategic vision of structural change" and the principle "from each according to their ability, to each according to their needs", lifted from the Communist Manifesto".

According to Left Unity's 2014 constitution, the party aims to build a society with (at least in the medium term) a private sector within the framework of a radical Left National Plan. In 2014, the organisation was committed to a mixed economic structure, stressing the need for "a democratically planned economy that is environmentally sustainable, within which all enterprises, whether privately owned, co-operatives, or under public ownership, operate in ways that promote the needs of the people and wider society". The 2015 pre-general election Left Unity manifesto appears instead to pursue a more far-left line and refers to the needs for an economy "run democratically, not controlled by the few in the interests of 1% of the population. This means the principle of common ownership of all natural resources and means of producing wealth".

As of 2015, the party supported a minimum wage of £10 per hour. Loach, interviewed at the 2015 manifesto launch, said the party wished to emulate "the kind of economy that Syriza in Greece and Podemos in Spain are calling for".

=== Housing ===
As of 2015, Left Unity opposed the bedroom tax, the Right to Buy and other sales of social homes. Left Unity would reintroduce rent controls and security of tenure, using compulsory purchase powers to take over empty homes and end the criminalisation of squatting.

=== Environmentalism ===
Left Unity calls itself "red and green", with "red" referring to left-wing politics and "green" to environmentalism. The party believes that capitalism ignores the ecosystem:

Ecological devastation, resulting from the insatiable need to increase profits, is not an accidental feature of capitalism: it is built into the system’s DNA and cannot be reformed away. Capitalism is increasingly demonstrating its total incompatibility with the maintenance of our ecosystem through its ruthless exploitation of ever scarcer natural resources, its pollution of the environment, the growing loss of biological and agricultural diversity and increasing climate change. ...

When the politicians propose using market mechanisms to limit carbon emissions, it is clear that they cannot see a more democratic or sane way out of the climate crisis. International policies like carbon "cap and trade" that allow companies to buy the "rights" to pollute, or an ecotax that end up punishing the poor, are all measures that will not work in the long term to save the planet – instead giving the rich and powerful nations and individuals the right to continue to pollute legally.

Climate change is now inevitable, the question is how much and for how long and how much damage will it do. For us, socialism is the best way to manage the resources of the planet and ensure their democratic distribution in such a way that we are not destroying the environment to make a profit – as the corporations and energy companies are. No more "business as usual" means ending business as the driving force of the economy and instead looking to human – and environmental – need not corporate greed. If we want to save the planet we need socialism and we need it soon.

=== Equality ===
Left Unity is anti-racist, pro-LGBT rights, feminist, opposes religious discrimination and ableism and supports the rights of asylum seekers and "all those in need". Left Unity's position on safe spaces has been criticised by some on the left and a draft amendment was proposed by the Communist Platform of the organisation.

==== LGBT equality and feminism ====
The party has been defined as a "radical socialist party with strong positions on ecology and feminism" and "has a commitment to women comprising at least 50% of its leadership". Speeches deemed as supporting male privilege have been received negatively and it is claimed that "Left Unity is set to be a self-consciously feminist organisation".

==== Immigration and xenophobia ====
Left Unity is opposed to xenophobia and Luke Cooper of the Anticapitalist Initiative introduced socialist policies on immigration and racism. According to Cooper, there is no non-racist immigration control:

Left Unity completely rejects all anti-immigration arguments and rhetoric. We believe mass migration has had, and always will have, an overwhelmingly positive impact on society ... challenge[s] ideas in the labour movement, and even sections of the socialist movement, that openly support or implicitly endorse the idea of "British Jobs for British Workers". Immigration controls divide and weaken the working class and [are] therefore against the interests of all workers.

The party overwhelmingly voted in favour of this policy.

=== European Union ===
Left Unity has rejected left-wing Eurosceptic groups such as No2EU, a stance criticised by some other organisations. Instead, the organisation allied itself with the pro-European Another Europe Is Possible during the Brexit referendum campaign.

At its conference in November 2015, the party adopted documents describing the EU as "a reactionary anti-working class unreformable institution", but recognising that the 2016 referendum "can only produce a reactionary exit that would benefit only the xenophobic right wing of the Tory party and of UKIP". Thus the party described the vote to leave the EU as "a disastrous outcome", saying the following:

We deeply regret that the working people of Britain have been deceived and manipulated into believing that Brexit will bring about relief from the grinding austerity that is destroying lives and communities. We will now work tirelessly to oppose those who would divide us further. We will fight to defend the rights of working class communities and rebuild support for socialist ideas.

— Left Unity, quoted in Green Left Weekly.

=== Middle East ===
The party "stands in solidarity with the Palestinian people in their struggle against oppression and dispossession". It supports the Palestinian Boycott, Divestment and Sanctions campaign, calls for the return of Palestinian refugees and "resolutely oppose[s] any expression of antisemitism, whether within the solidarity movement or elsewhere".

In 2014, Left Unity was criticised by media outlets worldwide after a motion that called ISIS a "stabilising force" with "progressive potential" was proposed by two members at the party's annual conference. The motion received three votes (two from its proposers) and the conference overwhelmingly passed another motion that "the people of Syria including the Kurds of Syria have the right to defend themselves against the Assad regime and against ISIS.... ISIS is a reactionary and gruesome organisation which has caused suffering and death to the civilian populations of large parts of Syria and Iraq". John Tummon, one of the proponents of the motion, later joined the Hazel Grove Labour Party in March 2016.

At its November 2015 conference, Left Unity agreed a motion condemning Russian attacks in Syria, calling for an end to all foreign intervention and opposing any British military intervention.

== Supporting organisations and split ==
According to the International Socialist Network's Autumn 2014 Discussion Bulletin, it was then part of Left Unity with members elected to the party's national council. The CPGB (PCC) Communist Platform supporters within Left Unity (Jack Conrad and Yassamine Mather) announced that platform's dissolution on 20 February 2016 following Left Unity's refusal to accept their motion. The CPGB (PCC) issued a statement condemning Left Unity's support for Labourism, Momentum and Jeremy Corbyn, emphasising the need for "a real communist party", adding that by its "refusal to rethink its perspective [...] Left Unity has condemned itself to permanent irrelevance".

Left Unity is generally based on individual membership rather than organisational affiliation.

On 20 January 2022, it was announced that a "memorandum of understanding" had been agreed between Left Unity, the Breakthrough Party, the Northern Independence Party and the Trade Unionist and Socialist Coalition. This alliance will work together on a future electoral strategy.

Towards the end of July 2023, a left-wing political party merger between Breakthrough, Left Unity, People's Alliance of the Left and Liverpool Community Independents under the name Transform was proposed. It was proposed in response to "an era of crisis" which the party merger proposal claims to be "a political organisation that offers a real solution" to. The party merger proposal also has 10 "core principles". However, Left Unity has remained an independent party since the founding of Transform in November 2023 and has declared the launching of the latter "premature".

The April 2026 conference voted to align with Your Party and voted down a motion to disband.

== Electoral activity ==
=== 2014 local elections ===
In local elections on 22 May 2014, Left Unity stood 11 candidates in four districts: Wigan, Barnet, Exeter and Norwich. They received 1,038 votes out of 74,126 cast, or an average of 3.2%.^{[note 1]} In Wigan West, party candidate Hazel Duffy received 8.8%. Left Unity had its first council seat in Stoke-on-Trent between March and May 2015 after a councillor defected from the Labour Party.

=== 2015 general election ===
The party stood ten candidates in the 2015 general election on 7 May 2015, seven of which were jointly candidates of Left Unity and of the Trade Unionist and Socialist Coalition (TUSC). A number of party candidates (some jointly with TUSC) also stood in local elections that day.

=== Following Labour leadership elections ===
Left Unity was profoundly impacted by the Labour Party leadership election of September 2015, when Jeremy Corbyn was elected. During the leadership election, Left Unity opposed what it saw as a "witch hunt" against left-wingers who were not Labour Party members, but were allowed to vote for Corbyn as leader because of election rules that were changed under former leader Ed Miliband. However, it has been calculated that Corbyn would have won in the first round with 51% of votes, even without "£3 registered supporters", having gained the support of 49.6% of full members and 57.6% of affiliated (trade union) supporters.

Accompanying Corbyn's campaign and unexpected election was a significant influx of several hundred thousand of new members and supporters, shifting the political direction and membership base of the party leftwards. In the weeks following Corbyn's election as Leader of the Labour Party, approximately 300 Left Unity members, including many prominent leadership figures, resigned and joined the Labour Party. The November 2015 Left Unity Party Conference was dominated by the issue of what to do now that the Labour Party was led by Corbyn, a leader with politics similar to those of Left Unity, but with a mass membership of socialists, compared to Left Unity's then 1,500 members—down from its 2014 peak of 2,000. Many of the motions discussed the possible dissolution of Left Unity as a political party, with party members joining either the Labour Party itself or Momentum. By July 2016, membership had fallen further to 1,230 members.

In the run-up to the Labour leadership election one year later, individuals who had retweeted Left Unity were accused of supporting rival parties and therefore expelled from the party, therefore being unable to vote in the leadership election. Left Unity and others on social media saw this as hypocritical and contributed to the rise of the hashtag #LabourPurge on Twitter.

=== 2017 general election ===
Left Unity called for a victory for Labour in the 2017 general election.

=== 2019 general election ===
Left Unity again called for a victory for Labour in the 2019 general election.

== Protests ==
In 2014, the organisation protested at then Education Secretary Michael Gove following the decision by two examination boards (AQA and OCR) within the United Kingdom to remove American literature from their set texts with a short sit-in protest in the Department for Education (DfE) headquarters in central London. Left Unity accused the new curriculum of propagating "a more narrow teaching agenda in our schools".

== Notes ==
1. This total includes votes cast in the multiple-candidate ward of Oakleigh, where Left Unity only stood one candidate; the percentage calculation is not adjusted.
