= Trade Unionist and Socialist Coalition =

- TUSC logo
- Abbreviation: TUSC
- Leader: Dave Nellist
- Founded: 2010; 16 years ago
- Headquarters: 17 Colebert House; Colbert Avenue; London; E1 4JP
- Ideology: Socialism; Trade unionism; Trotskyism
- Political position: Left-wing to far-left
- Colours: Pink, brown and red
- Members: Socialist Party; Socialist Party Scotland; (List)
- Councillors: 1 / 18,740

Election symbol

Website
- www.tusc.org.uk

The Trade Unionist and Socialist Coalition (TUSC) is a socialist electoral alliance registered as a political party in Britain. It was originally launched for the 2010 general election.

TUSC's co-founder was the RMT union general secretary Bob Crow. Members of the PCS, Unison, NEU, UCU, Napo and POA unions are on the steering committee. The biggest component section of TUSC was the RMT until they disaffiliated at the 2022 RMT AGM. The most prominent participating political groups are the Socialist Party and the Resistance Movement. TUSC stood 135 (parliamentary) candidates across England, Wales and Scotland at the 2015 general election and 619 the same day in local government elections.

The TUSC ceased standing candidates following the election of Jeremy Corbyn as leader of the Labour Party and endorsed his leadership, suspending electoral activity in November 2018. Following Corbyn's resignation and succession by Keir Starmer in 2020, the Socialist Party called for the relaunch of the alliance; the TUSC steering committee agreed to resume standing candidates in the 2021 UK local elections. It stood further candidates in the 2022 UK local elections, and 40 candidates at the 2024 United Kingdom general election.

Within two weeks of its announcement, the coalition declared its "full backing" for Corbyn and Zarah Sultana's Your Party initiative.

== Background ==
In March 2009, the Socialist Party launched the electoral alliance No2EU to contest the 2009 European Parliament election with Bob Crow as its leader and with participation from the RMT, Communist Party of Britain, and Solidarity.

In November, the Socialist Party stated it was in talks to create a similar alliance for the 2010 United Kingdom general election and proposed the initial name: "Trade Unionists and Green Socialists Alliance".

Meanwhile, just after the 2009 European Elections, the Socialist Workers Party, which had not taken part in No2EU but which had itself been part of the Socialist Alliance and the Respect Party, published its "Open Letter to the Left", in which it called for "a united fightback to save jobs and services" and subsequently joined TUSC.

== History ==
The TUSC was officially launched in January 2010, with initial backing from individuals and branches within trade unions, but no endorsements from the RMT, the POA, the PCS, or the Fire Brigades Union. The CPB and Alliance for Green Socialism did not join the alliance, the former due to a lack of trade union representation, and the latter due to differences with the other alliance members.

TUSC chairperson Dave Nellist stood as a candidate for the coalition in the constituency of Coventry North East. Among the other candidates were Jackie Grunsell in Colne Valley constituency, Keith Gibson in Hull West and Hessle, Dave Hill in Brighton Kemptown, Ian Page in Lewisham Deptford, Rob Williams in Swansea West and Tim Cutter in Southampton Itchen.

The SWP left TUSC (England and wales) in March 2017, but remained part of the autonomous Scottish TUSC for a time, before leaving entirely.

In July 2020, the Socialist Party called for the relaunch of the electoral alliance and in September the TUSC steering committee agreed to resume standing candidates in the 2021 UK local elections.

=== People's Alliance of the Left ===
On 20 January 2022, it was announced that a "memorandum of understanding" had been agreed between TUSC, the Breakthrough Party, the Northern Independence Party and Left Unity. This alliance, known as the People's Alliance of the Left (PAL), would see the four parties work together on a future electoral strategy. It did not last long, however, as TUSC was removed from PAL after its Steering Committee agreed "observer status" for the Workers Party of Britain, led by former Labour Party and Respect Party MP George Galloway. In a statement, the NIP said that degrading statements made both by Galloway and other Workers Party members about women, non-binary people and immigration had made it impossible for TUSC to remain part of PAL.

Towards the end of July 2023, a left-wing political party merger between Breakthrough, Left Unity, People's Alliance of the Left and Liverpool Community Independents under the name "Transform" was proposed. It was proposed in response to "an era of crisis" which the party merger proposal claims to be "a political organisation that offers a real solution" to. The party merger proposal also has 10 "core principles". Ultimately, the TUSC did not join this merger.

== Trade union interaction ==
=== Trade union endorsement ===
Three Annual General Meetings (2012, 2013 and 2014) of the National Union of Rail, Maritime and Transport Workers (RMT) under the leadership of Bob Crow, endorsed RMT support for TUSC candidates and the RMT was formally represented on the TUSC steering committee.

TUSC claimed in September 2020 that the RMT executive urged TUSC to resume electoral activity after Jeremy Corbyn stepped down as Labour Party leader. TUSC stated: 'Representatives from the biggest component organisation of TUSC, the RMT transport workers’ union, reported to the [TUSC national steering committee] meeting on 2 September, that the union's national executive committee had debated the matter over the summer. They had agreed that, “in the new conditions of a Starmer leadership and the continued implementation of austerity cuts by many Labour-led authorities, we believe it is correct for TUSC to lift its suspension of electoral activity”. And that is what the steering committee agreed.'

After the relaunch of TUSC, the 11 November 2021 steering committee meeting was attended, in a personal capacity, by members of the executives of five different unions: the public sector union, UNISON; the National Education Union (NEU); the PCS civil servants' union; the university and College Union (UCU); and the family court and probation workers' union NAPO. The RMT was absent.

=== Unite the Union and TUSC ===
In 2022, under newly elected General Secretary Sharon Graham, Unite responded to TUSC's invitation and formally deputised the union's Lead for Local Government, Onay Kasab, to TUSC's annual conference on Sunday February 6 to 'explain the extremely significant decision of [Unite's] recent policy conference to call on “Labour councils to set legal, balanced no cuts needs based budgets” rather than meekly accept the Tories’ austerity agenda', which echoed a policy position of TUSC.

Previously, in February 2015, senior figures from Unite the Union condemned the Socialist Party and by implication TUSC, for standing candidates against Labour in marginal constituencies for the 2015 general election. The open letter addressed to the Socialist Party, which does not mention TUSC, accuses the Socialist Party of having a "derisory" electoral record. In response, the Socialist Party claimed that a Labour government "would be at best austerity-lite and a continuation of the crisis that faces working class people".

== Organisation ==
TUSC is an umbrella organisation with a federal structure. It has been registered as a political party with the Electoral Commission since 2010. All candidates supporting the coalition must support a core policy platform, but beyond this each candidate is free to campaign on the platform of their own political party.

=== All-Britain Steering Committee ===
Each of TUSC's constituent organisations is entitled to have representatives on the All-Britain Steering Committee, where they engage in decision-making regarding policy, strategy, and the selection of candidates. Until 2022, these organisations included, most notably, the RMT, the Socialist Party, the Socialist Party Scotland (Scottish TUSC), and the Resistance Movement.

=== National and local steering committees ===
TUSC participants in Scotland are nationally organised with an autonomous Scottish TUSC Steering Committee. Additionally, local branches of TUSC each have their own steering committees established for local government areas and parliamentary constituencies where TUSC contests seats.

=== Current and past participating organisations ===
The following organisations have been involved in TUSC at various times:

Current members

- DayMer
- Hull Red Labour
- the Labour Representation Committee
- Left Unity
- Leicester Independent Councillors Against the Cuts
- the Pan-African Congress
- the Socialist Resistance
- the Socialist Party (England and Wales)
- the Socialist Party Scotland
- Southampton Councillors Against Cuts
- the United Socialist Party

Former members

- the National Union of Rail, Maritime and Transport Workers (RMT) (left in 2022)
- the Resist Movement (now a part of Workers Party of Britain)
- the Respect Party (defunct)
- the Socialist Workers Party (left in 2017)

== Elections ==
=== Electoral activity ===
TUSC has contested elections to the House of Commons (2010 and 2015), Holyrood (2016 and 2021), the Senedd (2011, 2016 and 2021) and local government. In the 2014 elections for the European parliament TUSC supported the No2EU coalition.

During the Labour leadership of Jeremy Corbyn (2015–2020), TUSC opted for a selective electoral strategy. The group only challenged some Labour candidates in the 2017 United Kingdom local elections and did not stand against any Labour candidates in the 2017 United Kingdom general election. The TUSC endorsed Labour in 2017 and 2019. After the defeat of Labour in the 2019 election and the replacement of Corbyn as leader by Keir Starmer in April 2020, TUSC has decided to lift its suspension of electoral activity.

Map of the constituencies TUSC contested in the 2015 general election.

=== General elections ===
==== Summary of general election performance ====
Year	Candidates	Total votes	Mean votes per candidate	Of total (%)	Difference (pp)	Saved deposits^{*}	MPs	Rank
2010	44	15,573	354	0.1	Steady	0	0	20
2015	126	36,327	284	0.1	Steady	0	0	14
2017	Endorsed Labour	—N/a						
2019	Endorsed Labour	—N/a						
2024	40	12,562	314	0.04	Did not stand in 2019	0	0	20

== See also ==
- Socialist democracy
- Social Justice Party (UK)
- Transform (political party)
- Far-left politics in the United Kingdom
