= Bath and North East Somerset Council elections =

Class of election

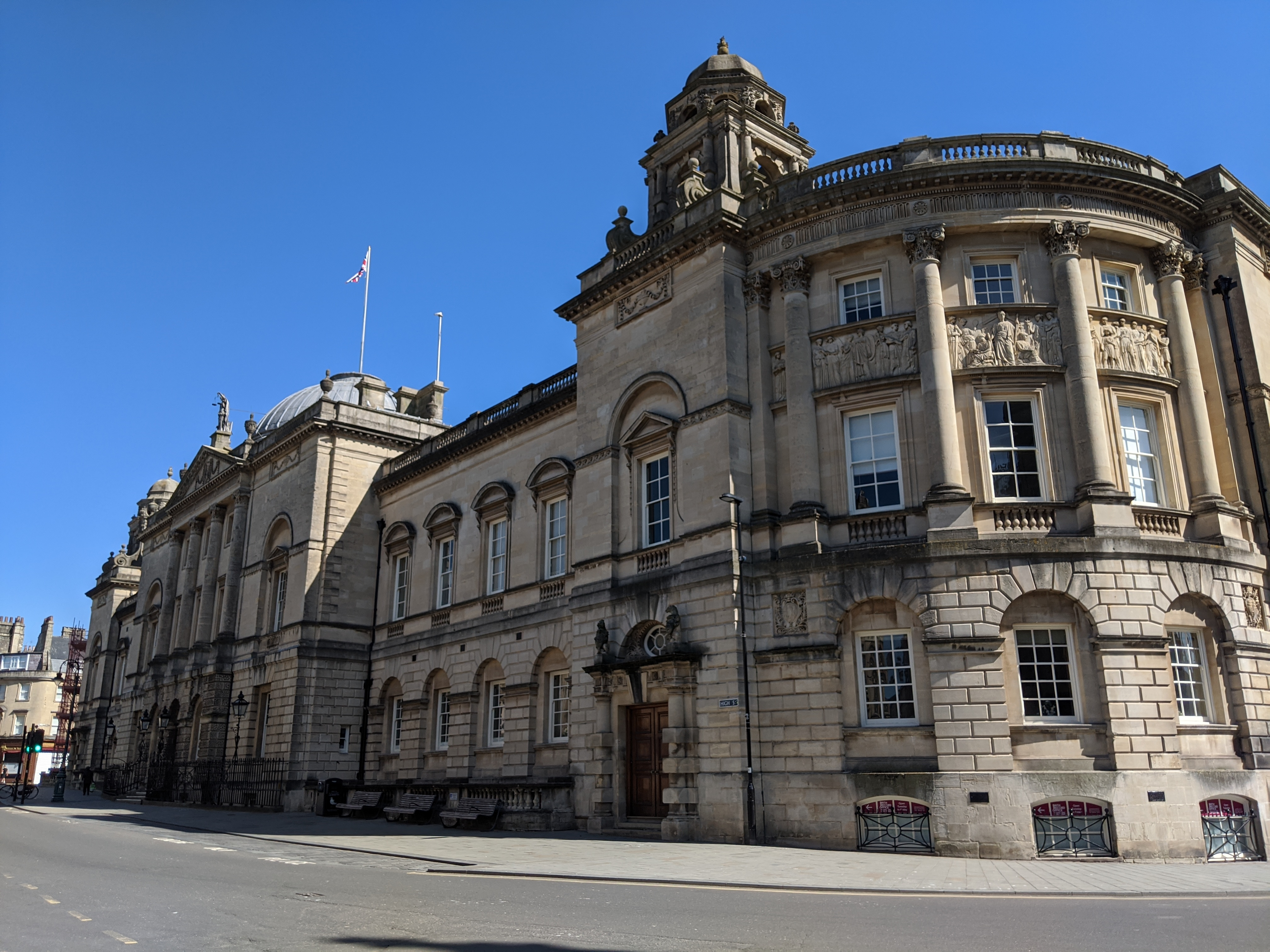
Guidlhall in Bath, headquarters of Bath and North East Somerset Council

Bath and North East Somerset Council is the local authority for the unitary authority of Bath and North East Somerset, England. The council is elected every four years by the first past the post system of election and currently consists of 59 councillors, representing 33 electoral wards.

== Election results ==
Composition of the council
Year	Conservative	Labour	Liberal Democrats	Green	Independents & Others	Council control after election
Council established from the merger of Bath City Council and Wansdyke District Council (65 seats)
1995	16	22	27	0	0	No overall control
New ward boundaries (65 seats)
1999	16	17	30	0	2	No overall control
2003	26	6	29	0	4	No overall control
2007	31	5	26	0	3	No overall control
2011	29	5	29	0	2	No overall control
2015	37	6	15	2	5 (Note: 3 Independents, 2 Village Voice)	Conservative
New ward boundaries (59 seats)
2019	11	5	37	0	6	Liberal Democrats
2023	3	7	41	3	5	Liberal Democrats

== Council elections ==
- 1995 Bath and North East Somerset Council election
- 1999 Bath and North East Somerset Council election (New ward boundaries)
- 2003 Bath and North East Somerset Council election
- 2007 Bath and North East Somerset Council election
- 2011 Bath and North East Somerset Council election
- 2015 Bath and North East Somerset Council election
- 2019 Bath and North East Somerset Council election (New ward boundaries reduced the number of seats by 6)
- 2023 Bath and North East Somerset Council election
- 2027 Bath and North East Somerset Council election (Expected)

== District result maps ==
1995 results map

1999 results map

2003 results map

2007 results map

2011 results map

2015 results map

2019 results map

2023 results map

== By-election results ==
By-elections occur when seats become vacant between council elections. Below is a summary of all by-elections; full by-election results can be found by clicking on the by-election name.

By-election	Date	Incumbent party	Winning party
Abbey by-election	17 July 1997	Liberal Democrats	Liberal Democrats
Weston by-election	19 February 1998	Liberal Democrats	Liberal Democrats
Lansdown by-election	4 May 2000	Conservative	Conservative
Bathavon North by-election	12 October 2000	Conservative	Conservative
Lansdown by-election	11 July 2002	Conservative	Conservative
Walcot by-election	11 July 2002	Liberal Democrats	Liberal Democrats
Radstock by-election	29 July 2010	Independent	Liberal Democrats
Chew Valley North by-election	15 November 2012	Conservative	Conservative
Bathavon North by-election	22 May 2014	Conservative	Conservative
Abbey by-election	17 November 2016	Green	Conservative
Walcot by-election	6 April 2017	Liberal Democrats	Liberal Democrats
Newbridge by-election	4 May 2017	Conservative	Liberal Democrats
Kingsmead by-election	5 July 2018	Conservative	Liberal Democrats
Saltford by-election	16 January 2025	Liberal Democrats	Independent
Mendip by-election	3 July 2025	Liberal Democrats	Liberal Democrats
Widcombe & Lyncombe by-election	9 October 2025	Liberal Democrats	Liberal Democrats
