= Yukteshwar Kumar =

Indian sinologist

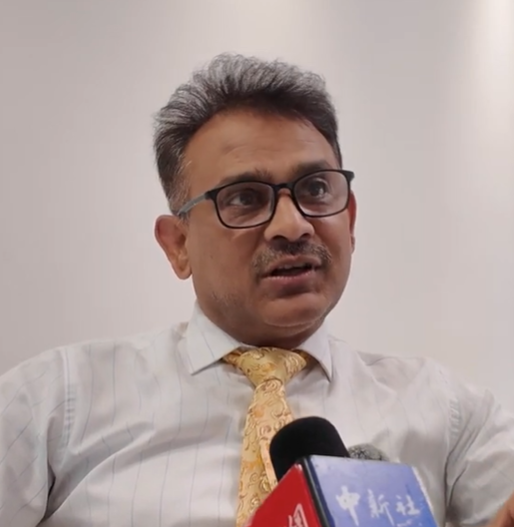
Kumar interviewed by China News Service in 2026

Yukteshwar Kumar (born 7 August 1970) is an Indian sinologist, born and brought up in Jagdispur. An alumnus of Jawaharlal Nehru University and Peking University, he taught from 1994 at Visva-Bharati University, Santiniketan, where he obtained his Ph.D. in 2002. Earlier, he also taught at Jawaharlal Nehru University, New Delhi, and worked at All India Radio..

After this he taught at Delhi University as Reader/Associate Professor in Chinese. He currently is Course Director of the Chinese Stream at the University of Bath. Kumar has authored several articles and books. He has provided opinion pieces and news items for Indian, Chinese, and British media including the BBC.

A public library, "The Dr. Yukteshwar Kumar Library" was established in his name at Jagdishpur, Bihar in September 2023 which was inaugurated by senior IG officer Sri Vikas Vaibhav.

In October 2023, Dr. Yukteshwar Kumar was bestowed with the prestigious accolade of "Social-Political Activist of the Year" in the NRI category by the Journalist Association of India, recognizing his unwavering commitment and impactful contributions to societal and political advocacy.

In October 2026, Dr Kumar attended the prestigious inaugural Global Governance Forum in Xiong'an, China, in his capacity as the former deputy mayor of Bath, UK; which was also attended by the Chinese Foreign Minister and Nepal's former President and over 400 dignitaries from 90 countries of the world.

In November 2026, Dr Kumar was empanelled on the advisory board of Indian think tank Visva Niti.

== Politics ==
In the 2015 local elections, Kumar stood in Lambridge ward but failed to attract enough support to get elected, ultimately coming in fourth behind the Green Party, the Conservative Party, and another Liberal Democrat candidate.

Determined to become a Councillor, Kumar stood in the 2019 local elections and came second in the Bathwick ward poll, which resulted in his election as a member of Bath and North East Somerset Council for the Liberal Democrats.

In September 2020, Kumar was voted as the most influential person in Bath through an online voting system.

In May 2021, Kumar was appointed deputy mayor of the city of Bath. He is the first person of Asian heritage to take the role of deputy mayor of Bath.

=== Controversies and defection ===
On 30 December 2021, Kumar resigned from the Liberal Democrats, writing on social media that for the past three years he has endured "bullies", "manipulative lies" and "discrimination" from within the local party, and that he would instead stand as an independent councillor for Bathwick.

These claims were strongly refuted by the Liberal Democrats who said that Kumar had been warned about his behaviour towards a female councillor on a number of occasions and, after he wrote that he was “thankful to God that perhaps he has chosen me to eradicate an evil person”, the party had chosen to contact the police.

Kumar has accepted he said these words, but claims that they were misunderstood and should not have been interpreted as a death threat. The police have confirmed they advised the female colleague on home security to ensure she felt safe.

In July 2022 Kumar joined the Conservative group on Bath and North East Somerset Council.

In the 2023 Bath and North East Somerset Council election Kumar, standing as a Conservative, was defeated in his bid for re-election by the Liberal Democrats.

== Media commentator ==
Kumar is often called by the Indian, British and Chinese media to appear on television and provide opinion on matters related with China and Chinese culture.
