= 2007 Bath and North East Somerset Council election =

2007 UK local government election

← 2003	3 May 2007	2011 →

All 65 seats to Bath and North East Somerset Council 33 seats needed for a majority
	First party	Second party
	Con	LD
Party	Conservative	Liberal Democrats
Last election	26 seats, 41.9%	29 seats, 36.5%
Seats won	31	26
Seat change	▲5	▼3
Popular vote	43,648	32,889
Percentage	43.2%	32.5%
Swing	▲1.3%	▼4.0%
	Third party	Fourth party
	Lab	Ind
Party	Labour	Independent
Last election	6 seats, 13.6%	4 seats, 5.4%
Seats won	5	3
Seat change	▼1	▼1
Popular vote	11,208	7,037
Percentage	11.1%	7.0%
Swing	▼2.5%	▲1.6%
- Map showing the composition of Bath and North East Somerset Council following the election. Blue showing Conservative, Red showing Labour, Yellow showing Liberal Democrats, and Grey showing Independents. Striped wards have mixed representation.
Council control before election
No overall control (Lib Dem – (Con Coalition)
Council control after election
No overall control (Con minority)

Elections were held on 3 May 2007 to elect 65 local councillors for Bath and North East Somerset Council. The results are shown below. Following the elections, a Conservative minority administration was formed. Cllr Francine Haeberling became leader of the council. This replaced the previous Liberal Democrat and Conservative coalition.

== Election results ==
Bath and North East Somerset Council election, 2007
Party	Candidates						Votes		
Party	Stood	Elected	Gained	Unseated	Net	% of total	%	No.	Net %
Conservative	65	31	8	3	▲5	47.7%	43.2%	43,648	▲1.3%
Liberal Democrats	63	26	3	6	▼3	40%	32.5%	32,889	▼4%
Labour	34	5	1	2	▼1	7.7%	11.1%	11,208	▼2.5%
Independent	19	3	2	3	▼1	4.6%	7.0%	7,037	▲1.6%
Green	19	0	0	0	Steady	0%	5.9%	5,929	▲3.4%
BNP	2	0	0	0	Steady	0%	0.4%	419	N/A

== Ward results ==
The ward results listed below are based on the changes from the 2003 elections, not taking into account any party defections or by-elections. Sitting councillors are marked with an asterisk (*).

=== Abbey ===
Abbey (2 seats)
Party	Candidate	Votes	%	±%
Conservative	Terry Gazzard	728	37.7	–9.8
Conservative	Brian Webber *	661	–	
Liberal Democrats	Roger Michael Crouch	633	32.8	–8.2
Liberal Democrats	Ian Thorn	621	–	
Green	Ian James Martin	345	17.9	N/A
Independent	Julian Emery	225	11.7	N/A
Turnout			42.2	
Registered electors		4,085		
Conservative hold		Swing		
Conservative hold		Swing		

=== Bathavon North ===
Bathavon North (3 seats)
Party	Candidate	Votes	%	±%
Conservative	Gabriel Batt	1,524	52.1	–1.1
Conservative	Ian Dewey *	1,522	–	
Conservative	Martin Veal *	1,517	–	
Liberal Democrats	Katherine Frances Hall	549	18.8	+4.4
Liberal Democrats	Anna Habermann	523	–	
Green	Justin Christopher Temblett-Wood	512	17.5	+8.2
Liberal Democrats	John Peter Munro	464	–	
Labour	David Walter Lavington	341	11.7	–3.4
Labour	Anne Brown	306	–	
Labour	Derek William Brown	274	–	
Turnout			47.8	
Registered electors		5,688		
Conservative hold		Swing		
Conservative hold		Swing		
Conservative hold		Swing		

=== Bathavon South ===
Bathavon South
Party	Candidate	Votes	%	±%
Liberal Democrats	Neil Butters	502	45.8	–17.7
Conservative	Harvey Haeberling	405	37.0	+0.5
Green	Janet Plater	189	17.2	N/A
Majority		97	8.9	
Turnout			51.0	
Registered electors		2,159		
Liberal Democrats hold		Swing		

=== Bathavon West ===
Bathavon West
Party	Candidate	Votes	%	±%
Conservative	Victor Clarke	450	54.3	+18.5
Liberal Democrats	Louise Bray	378	45.7	–18.5
Majority		72	8.6	
Turnout			42.1	
Registered electors		1,985		
Conservative gain from Liberal Democrats		Swing		

=== Bathwick ===
Bathwick (2 seats)
Party	Candidate	Votes	%	±%
Liberal Democrats	Nicholas Coombes	740	36.7	–4.2
Liberal Democrats	Armand Edwards	712	–	
Conservative	John Anthony Bailey *	614	30.4	–22.7
Conservative	Sir Elgar Jenkins *	439	–	
Independent	Jeremy John Ames Payne	367	–	
Independent	Lesley Annette Martin	288	–	
Green	Jenny Rust	214	10.6	N/A
Labour	Anthony Peter Schlesinger	83	4.1	–1.9
Turnout			44.2	
Registered electors		4,011		
Liberal Democrats gain from Conservative		Swing		
Liberal Democrats gain from Conservative		Swing		

=== Chew Valley North ===
Chew Valley North
Party	Candidate	Votes	%	±%
Conservative	Malcolm Hanney *	710	83.8	–1.3
Liberal Democrats	Robert Ball	137	16.2	+1.3
Majority		573	67.6	
Turnout			45.8	
Registered electors		1,866		
Conservative hold		Swing		

=== Chew Valley South ===
Chew Valley South
Party	Candidate	Votes	%	±%
Conservative	Vic Pritchard *	614	72.9	+7.9
Liberal Democrats	David Brassington	228	27.0	–8.0
Majority		386	45.9	
Turnout			45.1	
Registered electors		1,884		
Conservative hold		Swing		

=== Clutton ===
Clutton
Party	Candidate	Votes	%	±%
Conservative	Stephen Willcox *	532	62.4	+8.4
Labour	Christine Mary Tanner	173	20.3	–8.0
Liberal Democrats	Gillian Rosme Roberts	148	17.4	–0.3
Majority		359	42.1	
Turnout			44.3	
Registered electors		1,933		
Conservative hold		Swing		

=== Combe Down ===
Combe Down (2 seats)
Party	Candidate	Votes	%	±%
Liberal Democrats	Roger Symonds *	1,152	50.7	+13.0
Liberal Democrats	Cherry Beath	1,087	–	
Conservative	Leila Wishart *	785	34.6	–6.7
Conservative	Alan Robert Garrett	715	–	
Green	Katherine Victoria Spear	333	14.7	N/A
Turnout			53.8	
Registered electors		4,074		
Liberal Democrats hold		Swing		
Liberal Democrats gain from Conservative		Swing		

=== Farmborough ===
Farmborough
Party	Candidate	Votes	%	±%
Conservative	Sally Davis *	725	74.2	–2.7
Labour	Terrance Gilbert Bishop	167	17.1	N/A
Liberal Democrats	Charlotte Moore	85	8.7	–14.4
Majority		558	57.1	
Turnout			47.0	
Registered electors		2,082		
Conservative hold		Swing		

=== High Littleton ===
High Littleton
Party	Candidate	Votes	%	±%
Conservative	Les Kew *	700	70.8	–6.3
Labour	Andrew Vincet Merchant	171	17.3	N/A
Liberal Democrats	Stephen Dawson	118	11.9	–11.0
Majority		529	53.5	
Turnout			43.3	
Registered electors		2,303		
Conservative hold		Swing		

=== Keynsham East ===
Keynsham East (2 seats)
Party	Candidate	Votes	%	±%
Conservative	Marie Brewer *	1,186	48.6	–3.2
Conservative	Bryan Organ *	1,174	–	
Liberal Democrats	Andrew John Wait	512	21.0	–17.1
Liberal Democrats	Roger Martin Clark	511	–	
Green	Alison Smith	297	12.2	N/A
Labour	Mike Tucker	238	9.8	–0.3
BNP	Brian Trevor Jenkins	208	8.5	N/A
Turnout			50.0	
Registered electors		4,378		
Conservative hold		Swing		
Conservative hold		Swing		

=== Keynsham North ===
Keynsham North (2 seats)
Party	Candidate	Votes	%	±%
Conservative	Charles Gerrish *	1,178	53.5	+17.9
Conservative	Brian Simmons	989	–	
Liberal Democrats	Keith Kirwan *	478	21.7	–13.4
Liberal Democrats	Vicky Cox	377	–	
Labour	Roy Staddon	301	13.7	–15.6
Green	Rick Smith	244	11.1	N/A
Turnout			49.1	
Registered electors		3,887		
Conservative hold		Swing		
Conservative gain from Liberal Democrats		Swing		

=== Keynsham South ===
Keynsham South (2 seats)
Party	Candidate	Votes	%	±%
Labour	Adrian Inker *	738	36.5	–10.1
Conservative	Alan Hale	617	30.5	+2.9
Conservative	Margaret Rose Brewer	568	–	
Labour	Paul Rabbeth	548	–	
Liberal Democrats	Tony Crouch	454	22.5	–3.3
Liberal Democrats	Michelle Allison Drew	331	–	
BNP	Clive Courtney	211	10.4	N/A
Turnout			47.9	
Registered electors		3,888		
Labour hold		Swing		
Conservative gain from Labour		Swing		

=== Kingsmead ===
Kingsmead (2 seats)
Party	Candidate	Votes	%	±%
Liberal Democrats	Andrew Furse *	720	44.9	–0.6
Liberal Democrats	Carol Anne Paradise *	601	–	
Conservative	Shirley Jeanne Paradise	464	28.9	–9.8
Conservative	William Campbell Viles	450	–	
Green	Eric Lucas	325	20.3	–3.4
Green	Gavin Withers	272	–	
Independent	Bruce Rowland	95	5.9	N/A
Turnout			39.3	
Registered electors		3,902		
Liberal Democrats hold		Swing		
Liberal Democrats hold		Swing		

=== Lambridge ===
Lambridge (2 seats)
Party	Candidate	Votes	%	±%
Conservative	Bryan Chalker *	891	39.2	–0.7
Conservative	Richard Maybury	761	–	
Liberal Democrats	Michael James Kelleher *	706	31.1	–9.8
Liberal Democrats	Sue Sutherland	671	–	
Green	Anna Clare Gillespie	484	21.3	+2.1
Labour	Martin John Pring	190	8.4	N/A
Labour	Laurel Denise Casserley	187	–	
Turnout			63.1	
Registered electors		4,022		
Conservative hold		Swing		
Conservative gain from Liberal Democrats		Swing		

=== Lansdown ===
Lansdown (2 seats)
Party	Candidate	Votes	%	±%
Conservative	David Hawkins *	970	67.5	+3.8
Conservative	Anthony Clarke	935	–	
Liberal Democrats	Yeing-Lang Chong	466	32.5	–3.8
Liberal Democrats	Henry Ford	466	–	
Turnout			43.2	
Registered electors		3,499		
Conservative hold		Swing		
Conservative hold		Swing		

=== Lyncombe ===
Lyncombe (2 seats)
Party	Candidate	Votes	%	±%
Liberal Democrats	David Bellotti *	931	37.2	–7.2
Liberal Democrats	Marian McNeir *	850	–	
Conservative	Dan Warren	840	33.6	–6.6
Conservative	Gavin Riach	819	–	
Green	Sebastian Buckley	387	15.5	+0.1
Green	Don Grimes	343	–	
Independent	Adrian Dolan	342	13.7	N/A
Turnout			56.2	
Registered electors		4,200		
Liberal Democrats hold		Swing		
Liberal Democrats hold		Swing		

=== Mendip ===
Mendip
Party	Candidate	Votes	%	±%
Conservative	Tim Warren *	589	66.0	–3.9
Labour	Lee Michael Thomas	119	13.3	+9.4
Green	Michael Jay	110	12.3	N/A
Liberal Democrats	Raymond Buchanan	74	8.3	–6.9
Majority		470	52.7	
Turnout			42.0	
Registered electors		2,124		
Conservative hold		Swing		

=== Midsomer Norton North ===
Midsomer Norton North (2 seats)
Party	Candidate	Votes	%	±%
Conservative	Shirley Steel *	762	43.1	+16.1
Conservative	Barry Macrae	717	–	
Labour	Pat Nicol	589	33.4	+8.4
Liberal Democrats	Gail Coleshill *	415	23.5	–8.2
Liberal Democrats	Grazie Dixon	252	–	
Turnout			37.1	
Registered electors		4,408		
Conservative hold		Swing		
Conservative gain from Liberal Democrats		Swing		

=== Midsomer Norton Redfield ===
Midsomer Norton Redfield (2 seats)
Party	Candidate	Votes	%	±%
Conservative	Chris Watt *	970	58.8	+22.4
Conservative	John Whittock	876	–	
Labour	David John Smith	585	35.4	+6.8
Labour	Fflyff McLaren	543	–	
Liberal Democrats	Rachel Sinkins	96	5.8	N/A
Liberal Democrats	David Marks	95	–	
Turnout			41.6	
Registered electors		4,051		
Conservative hold		Swing		
Conservative gain from Independent		Swing		

=== Newbridge ===
Newbridge (2 seats)
Party	Candidate	Votes	%	±%
Liberal Democrats	Loraine Brinkhurst *	965	53.2	–3.8
Liberal Democrats	Caroline Roberts *	921	–	
Conservative	Bob Baker	848	46.8	+3.8
Conservative	Donal Thomas Hassett	829	–	
Turnout			44.9	
Registered electors		4,255		
Liberal Democrats hold		Swing		
Liberal Democrats hold		Swing		

=== Odd Down ===
Odd Down (2 seats)
Party	Candidate	Votes	%	±%
Liberal Democrats	Steve Hedges *	789	44.5	–3.7
Liberal Democrats	Nigel Roberts *	704	–	
Conservative	Graham Paul Walker	491	27.7	–9.7
Conservative	Paul Julian Marquis	469	–	
Independent	Tony Gillingham	295	16.6	N/A
Labour	Liz Vincent	197	11.1	–3.3
Turnout			41.9	
Registered electors		3,931		
Liberal Democrats hold		Swing		
Liberal Democrats hold		Swing		

=== Oldfield ===
Oldfield (2 seats)
Party	Candidate	Votes	%	±%
Liberal Democrats	Shaun McGall *	854	49.5	–5.2
Liberal Democrats	Will Sandry	770	–	
Independent	Christopher Fry	349	20.2	N/A
Conservative	Louise Walker	328	19.0	–6.5
Conservative	Ian Leonard Norman Nockolds	250	–	
Labour	Mike Collins	195	11.3	–8.3
Labour	Grenville Malcolm John Young	172	–	
Turnout			37.0	
Registered electors		4,316		
Liberal Democrats hold		Swing		
Liberal Democrats hold		Swing		

=== Paulton ===
Paulton (2 seats)
Party	Candidate	Votes	%	±%
Labour	John Anthony Bull	637	49.7	–5.4
Labour	David Speirs	575	–	
Conservative	Michael Green	444	34.7	+6.6
Conservative	Kate Simmons	435	–	
Liberal Democrats	Luke Gilliam	200	15.6	–1.2
Liberal Democrats	David Matthews	179	–	
Turnout			34.3	
Registered electors		3,926		
Labour hold		Swing		
Labour hold		Swing		

=== Peasedown ===
Peasedown (2 seats)
Party	Candidate	Votes	%	±%
Liberal Democrats	Sarah Bevan *	874	42.0	–3.2
Liberal Democrats	Nathan Hartley	731	–	
Independent	Robert Butt	456	–	
Independent	Jonathan Paul Rich	366	–	
Labour	Zoe Papadopoulos	301	14.5	–22.7
Conservative	Peter Hancock	288	13.8	–3.8
Labour	Walter David John Terrance Reakes	280	–	
Conservative	Ben Houghton	241	–	
Green	David Peter Edler	164	7.9	N/A
Turnout			41.4	
Registered electors		4,755		
Liberal Democrats hold		Swing		
Liberal Democrats hold		Swing		

=== Publow with Whitchurch ===
Publow with Whitchurch
Party	Candidate	Votes	%	±%
Conservative	Peter Edwards *	577	74.6	+15.0
Liberal Democrats	Peter John Metcalfe *	126	16.3	+3.1
Labour	Anna Louise Nicol	70	9.1	–18.1
Majority		451	58.3	
Turnout			39.7	
Registered electors		1,956		
Conservative hold		Swing		

=== Radstock ===
Radstock (2 seats)
Party	Candidate	Votes	%	±%
Labour	Eleanor Jackson	611	46.7	+14.6
Independent	Allan Brian George Hall	483	–	
Independent	Deborah Jane Porter	430	–	
Independent	Phyllis Gay *	396	–	
Independent	Michael Boulton	376	–	
Independent	Jonathan Jeffrey Gay *	264	–	
Conservative	Lindsay Clare Elliott	213	16.3	+5.5
Conservative	Michael John Cobb	199	–	
Turnout			42.1	
Registered electors		3,920		
Labour gain from Independent		Swing		
Independent gain from Independent		Swing		

=== Saltford ===
Saltford (2 seats)
Party	Candidate	Votes	%	±%
Conservative	Francine Haeberling *	903	51.0	–15.3
Conservative	Gordon Wood *	799	–	
Independent	Reg Williams	386	21.8	N/A
Liberal Democrats	Peter Edwin Baker	311	17.6	–16.1
Liberal Democrats	Roger Mark Penny	187	–	
Labour	Carol Ann Tucker	170	9.6	N/A
Turnout			45.9	
Registered electors		3,324		
Conservative hold		Swing		
Conservative hold		Swing		

=== Southdown ===
Southdown (2 seats)
Party	Candidate	Votes	%	±%
Liberal Democrats	Dine Romero *	728	44.2	–12.2
Liberal Democrats	Paul Crossley *	611	–	
Conservative	Owen David Broadway	486	29.5	+6.5
Conservative	Guy John Gardener	449	–	
Green	Grant Davis	432	26.2	N/A
Turnout			36.3	
Registered electors		4,209		
Liberal Democrats hold		Swing		
Liberal Democrats hold		Swing		

=== Timsbury ===
Timsbury
Party	Candidate	Votes	%	±%
Independent	Douglas Deacon	425	35.8	N/A
Labour	Matthew Neal Davis *	384	32.4	–24.0
Conservative	David John Veale	331	27.9	–4.4
Liberal Democrats	Jenny Crossley	47	4.0	–7.3
Majority		41	3.5	
Turnout			56.3	
Registered electors		2,112		
Independent gain from Labour		Swing		

=== Twerton ===
Twerton (2 seats)
Party	Candidate	Votes	%	±%
Liberal Democrats	Tim Ball *	634	67.4	–5.9
Liberal Democrats	Gerry Curran *	461	–	
Conservative	Gavin Bishop	306	32.6	+15.7
Conservative	Zena Gay Tulyholowycz	245	–	
Turnout			28.7	
Registered electors		3,548		
Liberal Democrats hold		Swing		
Liberal Democrats hold		Swing		

=== Walcot ===
Walcot (2 seats)
Party	Candidate	Votes	%	±%
Liberal Democrats	David Dixon *	723	36.3	+1.9
Liberal Democrats	Colin Darracott *	706	–	
Conservative	Susan Elizabeth Francesca Yuille	605	30.4	–0.3
Conservative	William John Yuille	572	–	
Green	Nicholas Hales	475	23.8	+10.9
Labour	Patrick Michael Mccarron	189	9.5	–2.9
Labour	Bernard William Morgan	170	–	
Turnout			43.2	
Registered electors		4,274		
Liberal Democrats hold		Swing		
Liberal Democrats hold		Swing		

=== Westfield ===
Westfield (2 seats)
Party	Candidate	Votes	%	±%
Labour	Rob Appleyard	600	40.4	–
Independent	Chris Cray *	589	–	
Independent	Keith Pate	520	–	
Labour	Christopher John Dando *	518	–	
Conservative	Deirdre Horstmann	216	14.5	+1.7
Conservative	Margaret Grindrod	205	–	
Liberal Democrats	Nicholas Bahra	80	5.4	N/A
Liberal Democrats	Christine Helen Kirwan	79	–	
Turnout			35.6	
Registered electors		4,210		
Labour hold		Swing		
Independent hold		Swing		

=== Westmoreland ===
Westmoreland (2 seats)
Party	Candidate	Votes	%	±%
Liberal Democrats	Sharon Grace Ball *	500	31.1	–16.0
Liberal Democrats	Lynda Hedges *	464	–	
Conservative	Glenys Chalker	436	27.1	+6.5
Green	Jon Lucas	427	26.5	N/A
Conservative	Susan Gillian Henley Green	411	–	
Labour	Jean Adamson Campbell	247	15.3	–17.0
Turnout			32.4	
Registered electors		4,466		
Liberal Democrats hold		Swing		
Liberal Democrats hold		Swing		

=== Weston ===
Weston (2 seats)
Party	Candidate	Votes	%	±%
Conservative	Colin Barrett *	1,350	62.4	+12.6
Conservative	Malcolm Lees	1,184	–	
Liberal Democrats	David John Haydon Pickett	814	37.6	–12.6
Liberal Democrats	Shirley Ann Wilkins	783	–	
Turnout			53.1	
Registered electors		4,094		
Conservative hold		Swing		
Conservative gain from Liberal Democrats		Swing		

=== Widcombe ===
Widcombe (2 seats)
Party	Candidate	Votes	%	±%
Liberal Democrats	Ian Gilchrist	734	31.4	–10.4
Conservative	Brook Whelan	724	31.0	–3.0
Liberal Democrats	Nicole Mauricette O'Flaherty *	696	–	
Conservative	Scott Murray	552	–	
Independent	Harriet Stone	385	16.5	N/A
Green	Susan Patricia Bradley	346	14.8	+0.1
Green	Thelma Vivian Grimes	219	–	
Labour	Mary Elizabeth Young	150	6.4	–3.1
Turnout			48.4	
Registered electors		4,140		
Liberal Democrats hold		Swing		
Conservative gain from Liberal Democrats		Swing		

== By-elections between 2007 and 2011 ==
=== Radstock ===
Radstock By-Election 29 July 2010
Party	Candidate	Votes	%	±%
Liberal Democrats	Simon George Allen	542	40.1	N/A
Labour Co-op	Lesely Mansell	385	28.5	–6.6
Independent	Keith Pate	370	27.3	N/A
Conservative	Deirdre Horstmann	55	4.1	–8.2
Majority		156	11.5	
Turnout		1,353	33.1	
Liberal Democrats gain from Independent		Swing		
