= Jasper Becker =

British author and journalist (born 1956)

Jasper Martin Becker (born 19 May 1956) is a British author, commentator, and journalist who has spent two decades as a foreign correspondent, mostly in China.

== Journalism ==
In 1995, he joined the staff of the Hong Kong–based South China Morning Post. He was later promoted to the senior position of Beijing bureau chief, which meant he was in charge of all mainland content. In 2002, he lost his job, in an experience he writes about in a Washington Post column headlined "Why I Was Fired in Hong Kong."

Given his often critical views of China, his abrupt removal was considered by some to be a sign of deteriorating press freedoms in Hong Kong. Becker's dismissal for "insubordination" was widely reported in the international media. He was fired after commenting that the paper was restricting his reporting and downplaying coverage on AIDS and labour disturbances on the Mainland.

== Publications ==
- The Lost Country: Mongolia Revealed (1992) ISBN 9780340556658
- Hungry Ghosts: Mao's Secret Famine (John Murray, 1996), about the Great Chinese Famine
- The Chinese (John Murray, 2000)
- Rogue Regime: Kim Jong Il and the Looming Threat of North Korea (Oxford University Press, 2005) ISBN 9780195170443
  - ならず者国家 (2006) ISBN 9784794215192
- Dragon Rising: An Inside Look at China Today (National Geographic, 2007) ISBN 9780792261933
- Mongolia: Travels in the Untamed Land (I.B. Tauris, 2008) ISBN 9781845116491
- The City of Heavenly Tranquility: Beijing in the History of China (Oxford University Press, 2008) ISBN 9780195309973
- Made in China: Wuhan, Covid and the Quest for Biotech Supremacy (Hurst, 2021) ISBN 9781787384675
- Why Communism Failed (Hurst, 2023) ISBN 9781787388062

Becker has published both reportage and commentary for many news publications, including The New York Times, the International Herald Tribune, The Wall Street Journal, The Washington Post, The Globe and Mail in Canada, Business Week, the London Review of Books and the Times Literary Supplement.

== Commentator ==
He is considered an expert in Asian politics, and has appeared as a commentator on CNN and the BBC. American television networks often use him as a guest expert. He discussed the Tiananmen Square protests of 1989 with CBS's 60 Minutes and North Korea on ABC's Nightline with Ted Koppel, Primetime Live with Diane Sawyer, and ABC World News Tonight with Peter Jennings.

== Political career ==
Between 2015 and 2019, Becker was elected as a Conservative councillor for the Widcombe ward of Bath and North East Somerset Council. He stood again, unsuccessfully, at the 2023 Bath and North East Somerset Council election in the Odd Down ward, finishing third with 367 votes (20.4%).
