= 2027 Bath and North East Somerset Council election =

Future English local election

- 6 May 2027

All 59 seats to Bath and North East Somerset Council 30 seats needed for a majority
Leader	Kevin Guy	Robin Moss	N/A
Party	Liberal Democrats	Labour	Independent
Leader's seat	Bathavon North	Westfield	N/A
Last election	41 seats, 41.9%	7 seats, 15.7%	5 seats, 5.8%
Current seats	39	6	9
Leader	Tim Warren	N/A
Party	Conservative	Green
Leader's seat	Midsomer Norton Redfield	N/A
Last election	3 seats, 23.8%	3 seats, 12.8%
Current seats	2	3
- Political composition of Bath and North East Somerset Council by ward going into the 2027 election. Yellow denotes Liberal Democrat, blue Conservative, red Labour, green Green and grey Independent representation; striped wards have mixed representation.
Incumbent Leader
Kevin Guy
Liberal Democrats

The 2027 Bath and North East Somerset Council election is due to be held on 6 May 2027 to elect all 59 members of Bath and North East Somerset Council in Somerset, England. It will take place on the same day as the other local elections held across the United Kingdom.

The Liberal Democrats, led by council leader Kevin Guy, will be defending the majority they won at the 2023 election, when the party took 41 of the 59 seats.

== Background ==
=== Electoral system ===
Bath and North East Somerset Council is a unitary authority in the West of England, created in 1996 on the abolition of Avon County Council. The whole council is elected together every four years using the first-past-the-post system. The authority has 33 wards returning 59 councillors: 26 wards each return two councillors and seven wards each return one. These boundaries were introduced for the 2019 election following an electoral review by the Local Government Boundary Commission for England, and the same boundaries apply for the 2027 election.

=== Local government reorganisation ===
The 2027 local elections coincide with the first elections held under the reorganisation of local government in England, under which two-tier areas of county and district councils are to be abolished and replaced by new single-tier unitary authorities. As Bath and North East Somerset has been a unitary authority since 1996, it is outside the scope of the reorganisation and continues unchanged, holding its ordinary scheduled whole-council election on 6 May 2027.

== Council composition ==
Following the 2023 election the composition of the council was:

↓
41	7	5	3	3
LD	Lab	I	Con	G

Prior to the 2027 election the composition of the council was: (Note: The figures reflect the 2023 election result as altered by the 2025 by-elections and by changes of affiliation during the term, as recorded in the council's published list of members. Sources differ on the precise totals, giving the Liberal Democrats between 38 and 40 seats.)

↓
39	9	6	3	2
LD	I	Lab	G	Con

During the 2023–2027 term several councillors changed the party or group for which they had been elected. Ann Morgan, elected for High Littleton as a Liberal Democrat in 2023, subsequently sat as an independent. By 2026 the council's non-aligned members sat in three strands: an independents group, the Independents for B&NES group, and unaligned councillors.

== Previous election ==
The result of the 2023 election, at which the Liberal Democrats increased their majority and the Conservative group leader Vic Pritchard lost his seat, was as follows.

Result of the 2023 election
Party	Seats	+/–	Votes	%
Liberal Democrats	41	▲4	40,739	41.9
Labour	7	▲2	15,256	15.7
Independent	5	▼1	5,620	5.8
Conservative	3	▼8	23,121	23.8
Green	3	▲3	12,440	12.8
Total	59		97,176	100.0
