= 1999 Bath and North East Somerset Council election =

← 1995	6 May 1999	2003 →

All 65 seats to Bath and North East Somerset Council 33 seats needed for a majority
	First party	Second party
	LD	Lab
Party	Liberal Democrats	Labour
Last election	27 seats, 36.2%	22 seats, 33.2%
Seats won	30	17
Seat change	▲3	▼5
Popular vote	34,564	23,394
Percentage	40.3%	27.3%
Swing	▲4.1%	▼5.9%
	Third party	Fourth party
	Con	InLab
Party	Conservative	Independent Labour
Last election	16 seats, 29.3%	Did not stand
Seats won	16	2
Seat change	Steady	▲2
Popular vote	25,583	1,198
Percentage	29.8%	1.4%
Swing	▲0.5%	▲1.4%
- Map showing the composition of Bath and North East Somerset Council following the election. Blue showing Conservative, red showing Labour, yellow showing Liberal Democrats, and grey showing Independents. Striped wards have mixed representation.
Council control before election
No overall control
Council control after election
No overall control (Lib Dem minority administration)

Elections were held on 6 May 1999 to elect 65 local councillors for Bath and North East Somerset Council, the second election for the council. The results are show below. After the election, a minority Liberal Democrat administration was formed.

== Election results ==
Bath and North East Somerset Council election, 1999
Party	Candidates						Votes		
Party	Stood	Elected	Gained	Unseated	Net	% of total	%	No.	Net %
Liberal Democrats	65	30	–	–	▲3	46.2%	40.3%	34,564	▲4.1%
Labour	65	17	–	–	▼5	26.2%	27.3%	23,394	▼5.9%
Conservative	56	16	–	–	Steady	24.6%	29.8%	25,583	▲0.6%
Independent Labour	2	2	–	–	▲2	3.1%	1.4%	1,198	N/A
Independent	6	0	–	–	–	0%	0.7%	624	▲0.1%
Green	3	0	–	–	–	0%	0.5%	406	▼0.1%

== Ward results ==
The ward results listed below are based on the changes from the 1995 elections where boundary changes have not taken place, not taking into account any party defections or by-elections. Sitting councillors are marked with an asterisk (*).

=== Abbey ===
Abbey (2 seats)
Party	Candidate	Votes	%	±%
Liberal Democrats	Victoria Kilroy *	719	48.3	+2.8
Liberal Democrats	Agnes Melling *	668	–	
Conservative	Sir Elgar Jenkins	530	35.6	+2.5
Conservative	Michael Hobbins	525	–	
Labour	Gael Doswell	134	9.0	–9.3
Labour	James Anthony Walsh	110	–	
Independent	Ian Rae Callender Harris	105	–	
Independent	Margaret Marion Stewart	60	–	
Independent	Graham Alexander Vincent Hooker	47	–	
Turnout			34.9	
Registered electors		4,333		
Liberal Democrats hold		Swing		
Liberal Democrats hold		Swing		

=== Bathavon North ===
Bathavon North (3 seats)
Party	Candidate	Votes	%	±%
Conservative	William Anthony Cox *	1,056	53.4	+6.8
Conservative	Ian Dewey *	1,040	–	
Conservative	Esme Gladys Miles *	955	–	
Liberal Democrats	Christopher John Baxter	575	29.1	+1.8
Liberal Democrats	Jane Bridget Di Marco	561	–	
Liberal Democrats	Clive Alan Whitemore	528	–	
Labour	David Walter Lavington	348	17.6	–8.5
Labour	Hendrik Bebber	293	–	
Labour	Anna Beria	252	–	
Turnout			36.0	
Registered electors		5,704		
Conservative hold		Swing		
Conservative hold		Swing		
Conservative hold		Swing		

=== Bathavon South ===
Bathavon South
Party	Candidate	Votes	%	±%
Liberal Democrats	Gitte Dawson	606	62.1	
Conservative	Owain Maredydd Rhys	279	28.6	
Labour	Gareth James Mills	91	9.3	
Majority		327	33.5	
Turnout			46.0	
Registered electors		2,129		
Liberal Democrats win (new seat)				

=== Bathavon West ===
Bathavon West
Party	Candidate	Votes	%	±%
Liberal Democrats	Rosemary Rea Todd	412	58.6	
Conservative	Harvey Nicholas Haeberling	186	26.5	
Labour	David Turvey	105	14.9	
Majority		226	32.1	
Turnout			37.1	
Registered electors		1,899		
Liberal Democrats win (new seat)				

=== Bathwick ===
Bathwick (2 seats)
Party	Candidate	Votes	%	±%
Conservative	John Anthony Bailey *	571	59.3	+11.9
Conservative	Martin Robert Sykes	529	–	
Liberal Democrats	Lynn Walker Stewart	323	33.5	+5.6
Liberal Democrats	Alan Sykes	275	–	
Labour	Robert John Miles	69	7.2	–2.4
Labour	Diane Julie Mynors	62	–	
Turnout			26.6	
Registered electors		3,540		
Conservative hold		Swing		
Conservative hold		Swing		

=== Chew Valley North ===
Chew Valley North
Party	Candidate	Votes	%	±%
Conservative	Malcolm Hanney *	533	72.6	
Labour	Benjamin Guy Phillips	122	16.6	
Liberal Democrats	David Alexander Knapton	79	10.8	
Majority		411	56.0	
Turnout			40.0	
Registered electors		1,837		
Conservative win (new seat)				

=== Chew Valley South ===
Chew Valley South
Party	Candidate	Votes	%	±%
Conservative	Vic Pritchard *	423	58.8	+6.0
Labour	Wayne Teall	160	22.3	–6.1
Liberal Democrats	Markus Gintas Sova	136	18.9	+0.1
Majority		263	36.6	+12.2
Turnout			42.2	
Registered electors		1,711		
Conservative hold		Swing		

=== Clutton ===
Clutton
Party	Candidate	Votes	%	±%
Labour	Robin Coombe Nicoll	357	46.8	
Conservative	Audrey Jennifer Telling	304	39.8	
Liberal Democrats	Alastair Derek Moss Bromhall	102	13.4	
Majority		53	6.9	
Turnout			39.5	
Registered electors		1,933		
Labour win (new seat)				

=== Combe Down ===
Combe Down (2 seats)
Party	Candidate	Votes	%	±%
Liberal Democrats	Jeffrey Stephen Manning *	1,056	49.5	+1.1
Liberal Democrats	Roger Symonds *	1,007	–	
Conservative	Leila Margaret Wishart	680	31.9	–8.7
Conservative	Alan Robert Garrett	528	–	
Independent	Jill Attwood	298	–	
Labour	Robert John Hicks	100	4.7	–6.4
Labour	John Edgar Thackwell	86	–	
Turnout			49.6	
Registered electors		4,041		
Liberal Democrats win (new seat)				
Liberal Democrats win (new seat)				

=== Farmborough ===
Farmborough
Party	Candidate	Votes	%	±%
Conservative	Sally Davis	538	56.5	
Labour	Lawrence Hunt	308	32.4	
Liberal Democrats	Andrew Bryce Halliday	106	11.1	
Majority		230	24.2	
Turnout			47.1	
Registered electors		2,028		
Conservative win (new seat)				

=== High Littleton ===
High Littleton
Party	Candidate	Votes	%	±%
Conservative	Les Kew	389	48.7	
Labour	Christopher James Alford May	315	39.5	
Liberal Democrats	Jocelyn Marion Clark	94	11.8	
Majority		74	9.3	
Turnout			36.6	
Registered electors		2,183		
Conservative win (new seat)				

=== Keynsham East ===
Keynsham East (2 seats)
Party	Candidate	Votes	%	±%
Conservative	Bryan Organ *	798	44.5	+1.5
Conservative	Leslie George Sell *	770	–	
Liberal Democrats	Jeanne Barbara Pinkerton	736	41.0	+1.5
Liberal Democrats	Mark Steven Cole	730	–	
Labour	Graham Hobbs	261	14.5	–3.0
Labour	Christopher Francis Penn	233	–	
Turnout			42.0	
Registered electors		4,477		
Conservative hold		Swing		
Conservative hold		Swing		

=== Keynsham North ===
Keynsham North (2 seats)
Party	Candidate	Votes	%	±%
Labour	James Alfred Lingard *	638	41.6	
Labour	Julie Stiddard *	621	–	
Liberal Democrats	Keith Kirwan	564	36.8	
Liberal Democrats	Hazel Jean Pratley	430	–	
Conservative	Margaret Rose Brewer	332	21.6	
Conservative	Patricia Joy Wood	292	–	
Turnout			38.1	
Registered electors		3,983		
Labour win (new seat)				
Labour win (new seat)				

=== Keynsham South ===
Keynsham South (2 seats)
Party	Candidate	Votes	%	±%
Labour	Adrian Inker *	1,627	67.2	+7.0
Labour	Sheila Mary Bateman *	1,559	–	
Liberal Democrats	Christine Helen Kirwan	499	20.6	+5.1
Liberal Democrats	David Michael Usher	349	–	
Conservative	Antoni Victor Pielesz	295	12.2	–8.3
Turnout			36.7	
Registered electors		3,998		
Labour hold		Swing		
Labour hold		Swing		

=== Kingsmead ===
Kingsmead (2 seats)
Party	Candidate	Votes	%	±%
Liberal Democrats	Andrew Furse	652	46.7	+12.0
Liberal Democrats	Gerry Curran *	634	–	
Conservative	David Hawkins *	528	37.8	+3.4
Conservative	Elizabeth Ann Newnham	508	–	
Labour	Margaret Ann Burrows	217	15.5	–15.4
Labour	Julia Ann Thomas	169	–	
Turnout			33.3	
Registered electors		4,239		
Liberal Democrats hold		Swing		
Liberal Democrats gain from Conservative		Swing		

=== Lambridge ===
Lambridge (2 seats)
Party	Candidate	Votes	%	±%
Liberal Democrats	Ramon David Cliffe *	847	48.5	+0.5
Liberal Democrats	Michael James Kelleher *	786	–	
Conservative	Neville Paul Morgan	588	33.7	+3.0
Conservative	George Patrick Somers-Hall	553	–	
Labour	Bernard William Morgan	261	14.9	–6.4
Labour	Timothy Edwin Pearce	196	–	
Independent	Susan Mary Johnston	50	–	
Turnout			42.0	
Registered electors		4,103		
Liberal Democrats hold		Swing		
Liberal Democrats hold		Swing		

=== Lansdown ===
Lansdown (2 seats)
Party	Candidate	Votes	%	±%
Conservative	Alison McNair	800	57.3	+15.2
Conservative	Richard Robin Wilmington	757	–	
Liberal Democrats	Mary Geraldine Shelia Finch	446	31.9	–12.1
Liberal Democrats	Michael Jeffrey Williams	416	–	
Labour	Robert John Fraser	150	10.7	–3.2
Labour	Grenville Malcolm John Young	118	–	
Turnout			36.4	
Registered electors		3,792		
Conservative hold		Swing		
Conservative gain from Liberal Democrats		Swing		

=== Lyncombe ===
Lyncombe (2 seats)
Party	Candidate	Votes	%	±%
Liberal Democrats	Ann Harding *	1,215	60.4	+11.1
Liberal Democrats	Marian McNeir *	1,109	–	
Conservative	Brian James Hamlen	618	30.7	–5.8
Conservative	George Henry Hall	602	–	
Labour	Roger John Jones	177	8.8	–5.3
Labour	Michael George Arthur Wheeler	161	–	
Turnout			48.4	
Registered electors		4,111		
Liberal Democrats hold		Swing		
Liberal Democrats hold		Swing		

=== Mendip ===
Mendip
Party	Candidate	Votes	%	±%
Conservative	Thomas Fletcher Rees-Mogg *	363	47.0	
Labour	Harriet Joy Ajderian	306	39.6	
Liberal Democrats	Gillian Dorothy Dunkerley	103	13.3	
Majority		57	7.4	
Turnout			37.8	
Registered electors		2,045		
Conservative win (new seat)				

=== Midsomer Norton North ===
Midsomer Norton North (2 seats)
Party	Candidate	Votes	%	±%
Labour	Alan Edward John French *	680	63.7	+5.8
Labour	Gordon Arthur Derrick *	617	–	
Conservative	Ronald Abram	201	18.8	–4.9
Liberal Democrats	Patricia Clements	187	17.5	–0.9
Liberal Democrats	Rosalind Dawn Smallwood	141	–	
Turnout			25.5	
Registered electors		3,989		
Labour hold		Swing		
Labour hold		Swing		

=== Midsomer Norton Redfield ===
Midsomer Norton Redfield (2 seats)
Party	Candidate	Votes	%	±%
Labour	Betty May Perry *	703	58.9	–8.9
Labour	Derek John Herod *	613	–	
Conservative	Shelia Daphne Green	309	25.9	+6.8
Liberal Democrats	Gillian Rosme Roberts	182	15.2	+2.1
Liberal Democrats	Philip Henry Vernon Vine	146	–	
Turnout			29.0	
Registered electors		3,949		
Labour hold		Swing		
Labour hold		Swing		

=== Newbridge ===
Newbridge (2 seats)
Party	Candidate	Votes	%	±%
Liberal Democrats	Loraine Brinkhurst *	1,048	61.7	+17.8
Liberal Democrats	Caroline Roberts *	983	–	
Conservative	John Doran	463	27.3	–6.1
Conservative	Jeffrey Higgins	444	–	
Labour	Stephen Richards	188	11.1	–11.7
Labour	Andrew Cork	169	–	
Turnout			40.0	
Registered electors		4,327		
Liberal Democrats hold		Swing		
Liberal Democrats hold		Swing		

=== Odd Down ===
Odd Down (2 seats)
Party	Candidate	Votes	%	±%
Liberal Democrats	Steve Hedges	880	61.0	
Liberal Democrats	Nigel Roberts *	829	–	
Labour	Thomas Doughty	348	24.1	
Labour	Dennis Chales Nicoll	333	–	
Conservative	Audrey Archer	214	14.8	
Conservative	Jeremy Cecil Patterson-Fox	194	–	
Turnout			37.1	
Registered electors		3,952		
Liberal Democrats win (new seat)				
Liberal Democrats win (new seat)				

=== Oldfield ===
Oldfield (2 seats)
Party	Candidate	Votes	%	±%
Liberal Democrats	Ruth Griffiths *	956	56.8	+12.4
Liberal Democrats	Shaun McGall	853	–	
Labour	Hilary Fraser *	568	33.3	–12.9
Labour	Lynn David Harrington	496	–	
Conservative	Kenneth Philip Cragg	168	14.8	+5.4
Conservative	Robert Peter Shorthouse	153	–	
Turnout			41.1	
Registered electors		4,060		
Liberal Democrats hold		Swing		
Liberal Democrats gain from Labour		Swing		

=== Paulton ===
Paulton (2 seats)
Party	Candidate	Votes	%	±%
Labour	Patricia Ann Hogg *	693	71.7	+18.3
Labour	Brian Colin Barrett *	667	–	
Liberal Democrats	David Brassington	186	19.3	–2.8
Liberal Democrats	Tony Crouch	161	–	
Green	Mark Strickson	87	9.0	–1.6
Turnout			27.0	
Registered electors		3,730		
Labour hold		Swing		
Labour hold		Swing		

=== Peasedown ===
Peasedown (2 seats)
Party	Candidate	Votes	%	±%
Labour	Matthew Neal Davis *	596	49.3	–20.3
Labour	Peter Jovic-Sas	499	–	
Liberal Democrats	Roger Martin Clark	356	29.4	+11.6
Liberal Democrats	Andrew John Wait	284	–	
Conservative	Mark Andrew Jones	258	21.3	+9.2
Conservative	Robin John Maggs	255	–	
Turnout			28.9	
Registered electors		4,216		
Labour hold		Swing		
Labour hold		Swing		

=== Publow with Whitchurch ===
Publow with Whitchurch
Party	Candidate	Votes	%	±%
Labour	Marilyn Ann Hawkings	291	45.9	
Conservative	Douglas George Miles *	266	42.0	
Liberal Democrats	Mark Harley Davies	77	12.1	
Majority		25	3.9	
Turnout			33.5	
Registered electors		1,890		
Labour win (new seat)				

=== Radstock ===
Radstock (2 seats)
Party	Candidate	Votes	%	±%
Independent Labour	Phyllis Gay	653	46.4	N/A
Independent Labour	Jonathan Jeffrey Gay	545	–	
Labour	Christopher John Dando *	441	31.4	–43.8
Labour	Anne Marie Jovic Sas	287	–	
Green	Michael Boulton	157	11.2	N/A
Liberal Democrats	Paula Ann Kitley	155	11.0	–6.1
Liberal Democrats	Richard James Kitley	112	–	
Turnout			32.7	
Registered electors		3,845		
Independent Labour gain from Labour		Swing		
Independent Labour gain from Labour		Swing		

=== Saltford ===
Saltford (2 seats)
Party	Candidate	Votes	%	±%
Conservative	Francine Haeberling *	842	61.1	+10.9
Conservative	Gordon Wood *	753	–	
Labour	Richard Bateman	349	25.3	–3.0
Labour	Beverley Michaela Hunt	233	–	
Liberal Democrats	Anne Ledbetter	188	13.6	–7.9
Liberal Democrats	Hugh Jonathan Warren	149	–	
Turnout			37.6	
Registered electors		3,411		
Conservative hold		Swing		
Conservative hold		Swing		

=== Southdown ===
Southdown (2 seats)
Party	Candidate	Votes	%	±%
Liberal Democrats	Angela Godfrey *	978	72.1	+8.6
Liberal Democrats	Paul Crossley	944	–	
Labour	John Peter Salt	228	16.8	–8.7
Labour	Kathleen Salt	180	–	
Conservative	John Grant Ferrie	150	11.1	+0.1
Conservative	John Hamer Powell	146	–	
Turnout			31.6	
Registered electors		4,314		
Liberal Democrats hold		Swing		
Liberal Democrats hold		Swing		

=== Timsbury ===
Timsbury
Party	Candidate	Votes	%	±%
Labour	Graham Denis Stewart	479	59.0	+1.2
Conservative	William Alan Brown	255	31.4	+4.5
Liberal Democrats	David Matthews	78	9.6	–5.8
Majority		224	27.6	–3.3
Turnout			38.7	
Registered electors		2,102		
Labour hold		Swing		

=== Twerton ===
Twerton (2 seats)
Party	Candidate	Votes	%	±%
Liberal Democrats	Tim Ball *	789	72.1	+10.1
Liberal Democrats	Carol Anne Brown	667	–	
Labour	Karen Ruth Weston	223	20.4	–12.0
Labour	Stewart Edward Weston	213	–	
Conservative	Roger Waterhouse Smith	82	7.5	+1.2
Conservative	Kenneth James McLeod	77	–	
Turnout			29.1	
Registered electors		3,886		
Liberal Democrats hold		Swing		
Liberal Democrats hold		Swing		

=== Walcot ===
Walcot (2 seats)
Party	Candidate	Votes	%	±%
Liberal Democrats	Wahidus Samad Chowdhury	577	38.8	–0.1
Liberal Democrats	Godfrey Randall Hall	525	–	
Labour	Jean Adamson Campbell	470	31.6	–1.7
Labour	Peter John Robert Norris	461	–	
Conservative	Brian Webber	378	25.4	–0.3
Conservative	Benedict John Rogers	364	–	
Independent	Nicholas Hales	64	–	
Turnout			32.6	
Registered electors		4,488		
Liberal Democrats hold		Swing		
Liberal Democrats hold		Swing		

=== Westfield ===
Westfield (2 seats)
Party	Candidate	Votes	%	±%
Labour	Walter D. J. T. Reakes *	643	75.5	+9.0
Labour	Laurence William Carruthers *	546	–	
Liberal Democrats	Peter Clive Buckly Roberts	209	24.5	+1.4
Liberal Democrats	Jean Rose Elizabeth Vine	193	–	
Turnout			20.9	
Registered electors		4,171		
Labour hold		Swing		
Labour hold		Swing		

=== Westmoreland ===
Westmoreland (2 seats)
Party	Candidate	Votes	%	±%
Liberal Democrats	Sharon Grace Ball *	769	53.6	+9.6
Liberal Democrats	Lynda Hedges	690	–	
Labour	Gillian Wendy Pitman *	494	34.4	–9.3
Labour	Sylvia Back	463	–	
Conservative	Susan Gillian Henley Green	173	12.0	–1.6
Conservative	Caroline Jane Haslett	155	–	
Turnout			34.6	
Registered electors		4,198		
Liberal Democrats hold		Swing		
Liberal Democrats gain from Labour		Swing		

=== Weston ===
Weston (2 seats)
Party	Candidate	Votes	%	±%
Liberal Democrats	Timothy John Bullamore	920	46.7	–4.2
Liberal Democrats	Jane Marilyn Tapper	914	–	
Conservative	Colin Barrett	893	45.3	+19.0
Conservative	Henry Charles Rendall	755	–	
Labour	Frances Evelyn Kinsella	158	8.0	–8.8
Labour	Margaret Ann Pearce	145	–	
Turnout			47.5	
Registered electors		4,175		
Liberal Democrats hold		Swing		
Liberal Democrats hold		Swing		

=== Widcombe ===
Widcombe (2 seats)
Party	Candidate	Votes	%	±%
Liberal Democrats	Peter John Metcalfe *	875	55.1	–0.9
Liberal Democrats	Nicole Mauricette O'Flaherty	800	–	
Conservative	Peter Hilland	390	24.5	–1.5
Conservative	Gervase Antony Manfred O'Donovan	375	–	
Green	Susan Patricia Bradley	162	10.2	N/A
Labour	Mary Elizabeth Young	162	10.2	–7.7
Labour	Celia Philippa Mower	152	–	
Turnout			35.0	
Registered electors		4,319		
Liberal Democrats hold		Swing		
Liberal Democrats hold		Swing		

== By-elections between 1999 and 2003 ==
=== Lansdown ===
Lansdown by-election 4 May 2000
Party	Candidate	Votes	%	±%
Conservative	David Hawkins	777	52.1	–5.2
Liberal Democrats		517	34.7	+2.8
Labour		101	6.8	–3.9
Green		96	6.4	N/A
Majority		260	17.4	
Turnout		1,491	39.9	
Registered electors				
Conservative hold		Swing		

=== Bathavon North ===
Bathavon North by-election 12 October 2000
Party	Candidate	Votes	%	±%
Conservative	Martin Veal	993	50.5	–2.9
Liberal Democrats		699	35.6	+6.5
Labour		273	13.9	–3.7
Majority		294	14.9	
Turnout		1,965	34.5	
Registered electors				
Conservative hold		Swing		

=== Lansdown ===
Lansdown by-election 11 July 2002
Party	Candidate	Votes	%	±%
Conservative	Michael Ringham	667	56.1	–1.2
Liberal Democrats		417	35.1	+3.2
Green		62	5.2	N/A
Labour		42	3.5	–7.2
Majority		250		
Turnout			31.6	
Registered electors				
Conservative hold		Swing		

=== Walcot ===
Walcot by-election 11 July 2002
Party	Candidate	Votes	%	±%
Liberal Democrats	David Dixon	478	36.9	–1.9
Conservative		386	29.8	+4.4
Labour		276	21.3	–10.3
Green		116	9.0	N/A
Other		39	3.0	N/A
Majority		92	7.1	
Turnout		1,295	29.4	
Registered electors				
Liberal Democrats hold		Swing		
