= 1995 Bath and North East Somerset Council election =

1995 UK local government election

4 May 1995	1999 →

All 65 seats to Bath and North East Somerset Council 33 seats needed for a majority
	First party	Second party	Third party
	LD	Lab	Con
Party	Liberal Democrats	Labour	Conservative
Seats won	27	22	16
Popular vote	36,840	33,744	29,734
Percentage	36.2%	33.2%	29.3%
- Map showing the composition of Bath and North East Somerset Council following the election. Blue showing Conservative, Red showing Labour and Yellow showing Liberal Democrats. Striped wards have mixed representation.
Council control after election
No overall control

The 1995 Bath and North East Somerset Council election was held on Thursday 4 May 1995 to elect councillors to the newly formed Bath and North East Somerset Council in England. It took place on the same day as other district council elections in the United Kingdom.

These were the first elections to the new unitary council, which would come into effect on 1 April 1996. The new unitary authority replaced Bath City, Wansdyke District and Avon County Councils. The previous elections in for Bath City took place in May 1994, Avon County in May 1993 and Wansdyke District in May 1991. Future elections would take place every four years, with the next election scheduled for 6 May 1999.

The 1995 election saw no party take a majority of seats on the council, with the Liberal Democrats being the largest party.

== Election results ==
Bath and North East Somerset Council election, 1995
Party	Candidates						Votes		
Party	Stood	Elected	Gained	Unseated	Net	% of total	%	No.	Net %
Liberal Democrats	65	27	–	–	–	41.5%	36.2%	36,840	N/A
Labour	62	22	–	–	–	33.8%	33.2%	33,744	N/A
Conservative	62	16	–	–	–	24.6%	29.3%	29,734	N/A
Green	4	0	–	–	–	0%	0.6%	654	N/A
Independent	4	0	–	–	–	0%	0.6%	626	N/A
Natural Law	1	0	–	–	–	0%	0.0%	55	N/A

== Ward results ==
Sitting councillors on Bath City Council or Wansdyke District Council are marked with an asterisk (*), sitting councillors on Avon County Council are marked with a plus (^{+}).

=== Abbey ===
Abbey (2 seats)
Party	Candidate	Votes	%	±%
Liberal Democrats	Margaret Mary Feeny *	801	45.5	
Liberal Democrats	Victoria Kilroy	717	–	
Conservative	Jeffrey William Higgins	583	33.1	
Conservative	Jack Lufkin Garland Skeet	526	–	
Labour	Sylvia Back	322	18.3	
Labour	Grenville Malcolm John Young	294	–	
Natural Law	David Richard Hunter Cooke	55	3.1	
Turnout		1,683	38.8	
Registered electors		4,343		
Liberal Democrats win (new seat)				
Liberal Democrats win (new seat)				

=== Bathavon North ===
Bathavon North (3 seats)
Party	Candidate	Votes	%	±%
Conservative	William Anthony Cox *	1,189	46.6	
Conservative	Ian Charles Dewey	1,149	–	
Conservative	Esme Gladys Miles ^{+}	1,094	–	
Liberal Democrats	Clive Alan Whitemore	695	27.3	
Liberal Democrats	Jane Bridget Di Marco	689	–	
Labour	David Walter Lavington	666	26.1	
Liberal Democrats	Sheila Mary Fitzpatrick	661	–	
Labour	Stanley George Blethyn	642	–	
Labour	Janet Hooker	641	–	
Turnout		2,556	44.9	
Registered electors		5,696		
Conservative win (new seat)				
Conservative win (new seat)				
Conservative win (new seat)				

=== Bathavon South ===
Bathavon South (2 seats)
Party	Candidate	Votes	%	±%
Liberal Democrats	Jim Flower *	918	50.9	
Liberal Democrats	Brian John Wilson	697	–	
Conservative	Michael Frank Lindsay Purse	448	24.8	
Labour	Terence Pitt	437	24.2	
Conservative	Martin John Beresford Veal	423	–	
Turnout		1,640	46.9	
Registered electors		3,496		
Liberal Democrats win (new seat)				
Liberal Democrats win (new seat)				

=== Bathwick ===
Bathwick (2 seats)
Party	Candidate	Votes	%	±%
Conservative	John Anthony Bailey *	969	47.4	
Conservative	Edward Patrick Delany *	930	–	
Liberal Democrats	Diane Christine Bodle	570	27.9	
Liberal Democrats	Peggy Corinne Gwilt	457	–	
Green	Miller Davidson	311	15.2	
Labour	Diane Julie Mynors	196	9.6	
Labour	Karen Weston	161	–	
Turnout		1,865	39.9	
Registered electors		4,674		
Conservative win (new seat)				
Conservative win (new seat)				

=== Bloomfield ===
Bloomfield (2 seats)
Party	Candidate	Votes	%	±%
Labour	Matthew Neal Davis	747	42.0	
Labour	Philip Hardy	737	–	
Liberal Democrats	Stephen Maurice Hogg ^{+}	662	37.3	
Liberal Democrats	Colin Roland Bray	643	–	
Conservative	Ian John Prophet	368	20.7	
Conservative	Syed Salah Kamall	365	–	
Turnout		1,919	48.2	
Registered electors		3,982		
Labour win (new seat)				
Labour win (new seat)				

=== Cameley ===
Cameley
Party	Candidate	Votes	%	±%
Conservative	Trevor Charles Deacon *	404	50.9	
Labour	William Leslie Martin	256	32.3	
Liberal Democrats	David Brassington	133	16.8	
Majority		148	18.7	
Turnout		793	45.3	
Registered electors		1,751		
Conservative win (new seat)				

=== Chew Valley North and Clutton ===
Chew Valley North and Clutton (2 seats)
Party	Candidate	Votes	%	±%
Conservative	Thomas Fletcher Rees-Mogg *	706	43.1	
Conservative	Douglas George Miles *	616	72.6	
Labour	Sally Patricia Britton	601	37.3	
Labour	Michael Thomas Whitton	529	–	
Liberal Democrats	Frances Katherine Greenslade	331	20.1	
Liberal Democrats	Andrew Bryce Halliday	313	–	
Turnout		1,699	41.0	
Registered electors		4,140		
Conservative win (new seat)				
Conservative win (new seat)				

=== Chew Valley South ===
Chew Valley South
Party	Candidate	Votes	%	±%
Conservative	Victor Lewis Pritchard *	480	52.8	
Labour	Philippa Margaret Hawkins	258	28.4	
Liberal Democrats	Steve Hedges	171	18.8	
Majority		222	24.4	
Turnout		910	42.5	
Registered electors		2,139		
Conservative win (new seat)				

=== Chew Valley West ===
Chew Valley West
Party	Candidate	Votes	%	±%
Conservative	Malcolm Charles Hanney	551	48.9	
Liberal Democrats	Mark Burrows	339	30.1	
Labour	Andrew Robert Hawkins	237	21.0	
Majority		212	18.8	
Turnout		1,139	50.9	
Conservative win (new seat)				

=== Combe Down ===
Combe Down (2 seats)
Party	Candidate	Votes	%	±%
Liberal Democrats	Jeffrey Stephen Manning *	1,016	48.4	
Liberal Democrats	Roger Symonds *	929	–	
Conservative	Leila Margaret Wishart *	852	40.6	
Conservative	Simon Roderick Edwards	725	–	
Labour	Clive Charles Foreman	233	11.1	
Labour	Michael David Prowse	193	–	
Turnout		2,081	55.5	
Registered electors		3,749		
Liberal Democrats win (new seat)				
Liberal Democrats win (new seat)				

=== Farmborough and High Littleton ===
Farmborough and High Littelton
Party	Candidate	Votes	%	±%
Labour	Terry Bishop	512	40.7	
Conservative	Sally Davis *	334	26.6	
Independent	Janet Elena Hotter *	298	23.7	
Liberal Democrats	Rodney Douglas Leslie Tye	113	9.0	
Majority		178	14.2	
Turnout		1,278	55.5	
Registered electors		2,303		
Labour win (new seat)				

=== Keynsham East ===
Keynsham East (2 seats)
Party	Candidate	Votes	%	±%
Conservative	Bryan Organ *	969	43.0	
Conservative	Leslie George Sell *	956	–	
Liberal Democrats	Gillian Rosme Roberts	890	39.5	
Liberal Democrats	Christine Dacre Gorman	836	–	
Labour	Kenneth Jesse Bye	393	17.5	
Turnout		2,137	49.2	
Registered electors		4,347		
Conservative win (new seat)				
Conservative win (new seat)				

=== Keynsham North ===
Keynsham North
Party	Candidate	Votes	%	±%
Labour	James Alfred Lingard ^{+}	554	45.5	
Conservative	Richard Frank Pannett	281	23.1	
Liberal Democrats	Peter Clive Buckley Roberts	194	15.9	
Independent	Thomas Watkin Evans	189	15.5	
Majority		273	22.4	
Turnout		1,220	45.9	
Registered electors		2,658		
Labour win (new seat)				

=== Keynsham South ===
Keynsham South (2 seats)
Party	Candidate	Votes	%	±%
Labour	Sheila Mary Bateman *	814	60.2	
Labour	Adrian William Inker *	803	–	
Conservative	John Partrick Nelson Haxell	278	20.5	
Conservative	Antoni Victor Pielesz	244	–	
Liberal Democrats	Patricia Clements	191	14.1	
Liberal Democrats	Nigel John Greenslade	186	–	
Green	Francis Edward Hayden	70	5.2	
Turnout		1,355	41.9	
Registered electors		3,231		
Labour win (new seat)				
Labour win (new seat)				

=== Keynsham West ===
Keynsham West
Party	Candidate	Votes	%	±%
Labour	Julie Stiddard *	561	56.6	
Conservative	Peter Kenwood Courtier	229	23.1	
Liberal Democrats	Anthony John Crouch	201	20.3	
Majority		332	33.5	
Turnout		992	43.8	
Registered electors		2,263		
Labour win (new seat)				

=== Kingsmead ===
Kingsmead (2 seats)
Party	Candidate	Votes	%	±%
Liberal Democrats	Gerry Curran	583	34.7	
Conservative	David James Hawkins *	578	34.4	
Liberal Democrats	Agnes Melling	562	–	
Conservative	Elizabeth Ann Newnham *	560	–	
Labour	David John Hurst	518	30.9	
Labour	Lynn Harrington	516	–	
Turnout		1,740	43.9	
Registered electors		3,960		
Liberal Democrats win (new seat)				
Conservative win (new seat)				

=== Lambridge ===
Lambridge (2 seats)
Party	Candidate	Votes	%	±%
Liberal Democrats	Ramon David Cliffe *	687	48.0	
Liberal Democrats	Michael James Kelleher *	606	–	
Conservative	Paul Langridge	439	30.7	
Conservative	Graham Warburton Fitz	371	–	
Labour	Darren Garside	304	21.3	
Labour	Gareth James Mills	289	–	
Turnout		1,437	50.1	
Registered electors		2,870		
Liberal Democrats win (new seat)				
Liberal Democrats win (new seat)				

=== Lansdown ===
Lansdown (2 seats)
Party	Candidate	Votes	%	±%
Liberal Democrats	Jeff Kenyon *	800	44.0	
Conservative	Sheila Mary Sheppard *	765	42.1	
Liberal Democrats	Michael Jeffrey Williams	753	–	
Conservative	Keith Tempest	730	–	
Labour	Robert John Fraser	252	13.9	
Labour	Allison Ruth Talbot	211	–	
Turnout		1,797	46.7	
Registered electors		3,852		
Liberal Democrats win (new seat)				
Conservative win (new seat)				

=== Lyncombe ===
Lyncombe (2 seats)
Party	Candidate	Votes	%	±%
Liberal Democrats	Ann Harding *	1,074	49.3	
Liberal Democrats	Marian McNeir	905	–	
Conservative	George Henry Hall	796	36.5	
Conservative	Elgar Spencer Jenkins *	714	–	
Labour	Andrew Jack Whitehead	308	14.1	
Labour	Sylvia Rita Mossop	249	–	
Turnout		2,127	51.5	
Registered electors		4,133		
Liberal Democrats win (new seat)				
Liberal Democrats win (new seat)				

=== Midsomer Norton North ===
Midsomer Norton North (2 seats)
Party	Candidate	Votes	%	±%
Labour	Alan Edward John French *	883	57.9	
Labour	Gordon Arthur Derrick *	701	–	
Conservative	Shirley Steel *	361	23.7	
Liberal Democrats	Nicholas Thomas Alec Beaumont	280	18.4	
Conservative	John Sidney Cantle	204	–	
Liberal Democrats	Mark Harley Davies	195	–	
Turnout		1,459	40.1	
Registered electors		3,635		
Labour win (new seat)				
Labour win (new seat)				

=== Midsomer Norton Redfield ===
Midsomer Norton Redfield (2 seats)
Party	Candidate	Votes	%	±%
Labour	Betty May Perry *^{+}	1,000	67.8	
Labour	Derek John Herod ^{+}	881	–	
Conservative	Shelia Daphne Green	282	19.1	
Conservative	Kenneth William Simpson	211	–	
Liberal Democrats	Kay Kirkham	194	13.1	
Liberal Democrats	David Michael Usher	171	–	
Turnout		1,415	45.9	
Registered electors		3,081		
Labour win (new seat)				
Labour win (new seat)				

=== Newbridge ===
Newbridge (2 seats)
Party	Candidate	Votes	%	±%
Liberal Democrats	Loraine Brinkhurst	824	43.9	
Liberal Democrats	Caroline Roberts	734	–	
Conservative	Evelyn Hampton	627	33.4	
Conservative	William Arthur Hampton	565	–	
Labour	Robert John Hicks	428	22.8	
Labour	Stephen Richards	367	–	
Turnout		1,949	46.1	
Registered electors		4,232		
Liberal Democrats win (new seat)				
Liberal Democrats win (new seat)				

=== Newton St Loe ===
Newton St Loe
Party	Candidate	Votes	%	±%
Liberal Democrats	Larissa Ruth Roberts	258	37.4	
Conservative	Leslie Bedborough *	201	29.1	
Labour	Maqsood Alam Zamir	126	18.3	
Farmer Independent	Ronald Luke Tibbotts	105	15.2	
Majority		57	8.3	
Turnout		680	47.1	
Registered electors		1,445		
Liberal Democrats win (new seat)				

=== Oldfield ===
Oldfield (2 seats)
Party	Candidate	Votes	%	±%
Labour	Hilary Fraser	901	46.2	
Liberal Democrats	Ruth Griffiths *	866	44.4	
Liberal Democrats	Paul Crossley *	814	–	
Labour	Philip Alfred Logie	801	–	
Conservative	William Arthur Charles Harman	184	9.4	
Conservative	Hilary Margaret Pointer	145	–	
Turnout		2,015	50.5	
Registered electors		3,991		
Labour win (new seat)				
Liberal Democrats win (new seat)				

=== Paulton ===
Paulton (2 seats)
Party	Candidate	Votes	%	±%
Labour	Brian Colin Barrett	775	53.4	
Labour	Patricia Ann Hogg	747	–	
Liberal Democrats	Kenneth Ellis	320	22.1	
Liberal Democrats	Neil Andrew Poulton	304	–	
Conservative	Audrey Jennifer Telling	202	13.9	
Green	Michael Boulton	153	10.6	
Turnout		1,408	38.6	
Registered electors		3,644		
Labour win (new seat)				
Labour win (new seat)				

=== Peasedown ===
Peasedown (2 seats)
Party	Candidate	Votes	%	±%
Labour	John Derrick *	814	70.2	
Labour	Esme Latchem *	792	–	
Liberal Democrats	Lynne Davies	206	17.8	
Liberal Democrats	Stephen Robert Ledbetter	191	–	
Conservative	Harvey Nicholas Haeberling	140	12.1	
Turnout		1,179	34.7	
Registered electors		3,403		
Labour win (new seat)				
Labour win (new seat)				

=== Radstock ===
Radstock (2 seats)
Party	Candidate	Votes	%	±%
Labour	Christopher John Dando ^{+}	1,216	75.2	
Labour	Bruce Shearn *	1,129	–	
Liberal Democrats	David Matthews	276	17.1	
Liberal Democrats	Jonathan David Gordon	275	–	
Conservative	Lynda Perrott	125	7.7	
Turnout		1,615	43.1	
Registered electors		3,751		
Labour win (new seat)				
Labour win (new seat)				

=== Saltford ===
Saltford (2 seats)
Party	Candidate	Votes	%	±%
Conservative	Francine Haeberling	783	50.2	
Conservative	Gordon John Wood *	724	–	
Labour	Richard Bateman	442	28.3	
Liberal Democrats	Julie Ann Bonnet	335	21.5	
Liberal Democrats	Jennifer Ann Herbert	317	–	
Turnout		1,450	42.4	
Registered electors		3,421		
Conservative win (new seat)				
Conservative win (new seat)				

=== Southdown ===
Southdown (2 seats)
Party	Candidate	Votes	%	±%
Liberal Democrats	Marian Frances Hammond *	942	63.5	
Liberal Democrats	Angela Godfrey *	888	–	
Labour	John Peter Salt	379	25.5	
Labour	Kathleen Salt	324	–	
Conservative	Robin Dennis Stanbridge	163	11.0	
Conservative	James Antony Rigby	154	–	
Turnout		1,562	37.8	
Registered electors		4,137		
Liberal Democrats win (new seat)				
Liberal Democrats win (new seat)				

=== Timsbury ===
Timsbury
Party	Candidate	Votes	%	±%
Labour	Graham Denis Stewart	669	57.8	
Conservative	William Alan Brown *	311	26.9	
Liberal Democrats	Helen Vivien Elizabeth Davies	178	15.4	
Majority		358	30.9	
Turnout		1,165	59.4	
Registered electors		1,962		
Labour win (new seat)				

=== Twerton ===
Twerton (2 seats)
Party	Candidate	Votes	%	±%
Liberal Democrats	Tim Ball *^{+}	913	61.3	
Liberal Democrats	Keith Lunt *	774	–	
Labour	Herbert John Lear	483	32.4	
Labour	Jean Campbell	459	–	
Conservative	Julia Alexandra Noica-Richardson	94	6.3	
Conservative	Benedict John Rogers	88	–	
Turnout		1,491	42.0	
Registered electors		3,547		
Liberal Democrats win (new seat)				
Liberal Democrats win (new seat)				

=== Walcot ===
Walcot (2 seats)
Party	Candidate	Votes	%	±%
Liberal Democrats	Eddie Forrester *	640	38.9	
Liberal Democrats	Kate Keenan	566	–	
Labour	David Thomas Pearce	548	33.3	
Labour	Janice Helen Ross	517	–	
Conservative	Ahmedus Samad Chowdhury	423	25.7	
Conservative	Russell Howard Routledge	405	–	
Republic Meritocracy	Nicholas Hales	34	2.1	
Turnout		1,615	43.0	
Registered electors		3,757		
Liberal Democrats win (new seat)				
Liberal Democrats win (new seat)				

=== Westfield ===
Westfield (2 seats)
Party	Candidate	Votes	%	±%
Labour	Walter David John Terrance Reakes *	1,201	66.5	
Labour	Laurence William Carruthers	1,159	–	
Liberal Democrats	Raymond Charley Inchley	418	23.1	
Liberal Democrats	Roy Graham Ashworth	328	–	
Conservative	Margaret Rose Brewer	187	10.4	
Conservative	Gabriel Michael Batt	170	–	
Turnout		1,888	37.4	
Registered electors		5,054		
Labour win (new seat)				
Labour win (new seat)				

=== Westmoreland ===
Westmoreland (2 seats)
Party	Candidate	Votes	%	±%
Liberal Democrats	Sharon Grace Ball	763	44.0	
Labour	Gillian Wendy Pitman	759	43.7	
Liberal Democrats	Nigel John Roberts *	712	–	
Labour	Dennis Charles Nicoll	552	–	
Conservative	Susan Gillian Henley Green	213	12.3	
Conservative	Emma Ruth Henley Botham	204	–	
Turnout		1,782	44.0	
Registered electors		4,055		
Liberal Democrats win (new seat)				
Labour win (new seat)				

=== Weston ===
Weston (2 seats)
Party	Candidate	Votes	%	±%
Liberal Democrats	Susan Jane Aldridge	1,029	50.9	
Liberal Democrats	Susan Lesley Lowe	957	–	
Conservative	Christopher Andrew Guest	532	26.3	
Conservative	Alison Louise Guest	528	–	
Labour	Matthew Reeve	340	16.8	
Labour	Danny George Davis	304	–	
Green	Susan Patricia Bradley	120	5.9	
Turnout		1,954	48.7	
Registered electors		4,015		
Liberal Democrats win (new seat)				
Liberal Democrats win (new seat)				

=== Widcombe ===
Widcombe (2 seats)
Party	Candidate	Votes	%	±%
Liberal Democrats	Tony Clark *	960	56.0	
Liberal Democrats	Peter John Metcalfe *	889	–	
Conservative	Helen Rosina Cross	446	26.0	
Conservative	Mary Elizabeth Adams	440	–	
Labour	Mary Elizabeth Young	307	17.9	
Labour	Neil Rosser	306	–	
Turnout		1,755	43.7	
Registered electors		4,012		
Liberal Democrats win (new seat)				
Liberal Democrats win (new seat)				

== By-elections between 1996 and 1999 ==
=== Abbey ===
Abbey by-election 17 July 1997
Party	Candidate	Votes	%	±%
Liberal Democrats	Agnes Melling	643	45.0	–0.5
Conservative	Sir Elgar Jenkins	561	39.2	+6.1
Labour	Stewart Edward Weston	166	11.6	–6.7
Green	Anthony Kirk-Burgess	60	4.2	N/A
Majority		82	5.8	
Turnout		1,430	31.5	
Registered electors		4,556		
Liberal Democrats hold		Swing		

=== Weston ===
Weston by-election 19 February 1998
Party	Candidate	Votes	%	±%
Liberal Democrats	Colin Gordon Darracott	867	45.4	–5.5
Conservative	Colin Vincent Barrett	841	44.1	+17.8
Labour	Matthew John Reeve	151	7.9	–8.9
Green	Anthony Jonathan Ambrose	27	1.4	–4.5
Council Tenants against the sell-off	Susan Mary Johnston	22	1.2	N/A
Majority		26	1.3	
Turnout		1,908	46.3	
Registered electors		4,061		
Liberal Democrats hold		Swing		
