= 2003 Bath and North East Somerset Council election =

2003 UK local government election

- 1 May 2003

All 65 seats to Bath and North East Somerset Council 33 seats needed for a majority
	First party	Second party
	LD	Con
Party	Liberal Democrats	Conservative
Last election	30 seats, 40.3%	16 seats, 29.8%
Seats won	29	26
Seat change	▼1	▲10
Popular vote	29,759	34,167
Percentage	36.5%	41.9%
Swing	▼3.8%	▲12.1%
	Third party	Fourth party
	Lab	Ind
Party	Labour	Independent
Last election	17 seats, 27.3%	0 seats, 0.7%
Seats won	6	4
Seat change	▼11	▲4
Popular vote	11,122	4,375
Percentage	13.6%	5.4%
Swing	▼13.7%	▲4.7%
- Map showing the composition of Bath and North East Somerset Council following the election. Blue showing Conservative, Red showing Labour, Yellow showing Liberal Democrats, and Grey showing Independents. Striped wards have mixed representation.
Council control before election
No overall control (Lib Dem minority)
Council control after election
No overall control (Lib Dem - Con Coalition)

Elections were held on 1 May 2003 to elect 65 local councillors for Bath and North East Somerset Council. The results are shown below. Following the election, a coalition was formed between the Liberal Democrats and Conservative councillors. Cllr Paul Crossley became leader of the council.

== Election results ==
Bath and North East Somerset Council election, 2003
Party	Candidates						Votes		
Party	Stood	Elected	Gained	Unseated	Net	% of total	%	No.	Net %
Liberal Democrats	59	29	4	5	▼1	44.6%	36.5%	29,759	▼3.8%
Conservative	64	26	10	0	▲10	40%	41.9%	34,167	▲12.1%
Labour	34	6	0	11	▼11	9.2%	13.6%	11,122	▼13.7%
Independent	15	4	4	0	▲4	6.2%	5.4%	4,375	▲4.7%
Green	9	0	0	0	Steady	0%	2.5%	2,067	▲2%

== Ward results ==
The ward results listed below are based on the changes from the 1999 elections, not taking into account any party defections or by-elections. Sitting councillors are marked with an asterisk (*).

=== Abbey ===
Abbey (2 seats)
Party	Candidate	Votes	%	±%
Conservative	Sarah Elizabeth Webb	680	47.5	+11.9
Conservative	Brian Webber	613	–	
Liberal Democrats	Jane Marilyn Tapper *	587	41.0	–7.3
Liberal Democrats	Graham Richard Peter Smith	561	–	
Independent	Andrew Richard Edwards	166	–	
Independent	Graham Paul Walker	82	–	
Turnout			34.6	
Registered electors		4,105		
Conservative gain from Liberal Democrats		Swing		
Conservative gain from Liberal Democrats		Swing		

=== Bathavon North ===
Bathavon North (3 seats)
Party	Candidate	Votes	%	±%
Conservative	William Anthony Cox *	1,280	53.2	–0.2
Conservative	Ian Dewey *	1,265	–	
Conservative	Martin Veal *	1,239	–	
Labour	David Walter Lavington	363	15.1	–2.1
Liberal Democrats	Shirley Ann Wilkins	346	14.4	–14.7
Liberal Democrats	Lawrence Aggleton	330	–	
Liberal Democrats	Courtney Dale Lane	317	–	
Labour	Derek William Brown	293	–	
Labour	Hendrik Bebber	290	–	
Green	Michael Boulton	223	9.3	N/A
Independent	Adrian Philip Shute	195	8.1	N/A
Turnout			39.7	
Registered electors		5,539		
Conservative hold		Swing		
Conservative hold		Swing		
Conservative hold		Swing		

=== Bathavon South ===
Bathavon South
Party	Candidate	Votes	%	±%
Liberal Democrats	Gitte Dawson *	660	63.5	+1.4
Conservative	John Doran	379	36.5	+7.9
Majority		281	27.0	
Turnout			49.3	
Registered electors		2,131		
Liberal Democrats hold		Swing		

=== Bathavon West ===
Bathavon West
Party	Candidate	Votes	%	±%
Liberal Democrats	Rosemary Rea Todd *	434	64.2	+5.6
Conservative	Paul Baines	242	35.8	–9.3
Majority		190	28.4	
Turnout			35.1	
Registered electors		1,944		
Liberal Democrats hold		Swing		

=== Bathwick ===
Bathwick (2 seats)
Party	Candidate	Votes	%	±%
Conservative	John Anthony Bailey *	687	53.1	–6.2
Conservative	Sir Elgar Jenkins	645	–	
Liberal Democrats	Nicolette Helen Marie Rattle	529	40.9	+7.4
Liberal Democrats	Kenneth David Drain	506	–	
Labour	Ryan Thomas Jones	78	6.0	–1.2
Turnout			35.9	
Registered electors		3,520		
Conservative hold		Swing		
Conservative hold		Swing		

=== Chew Valley North ===
Chew Valley North
Party	Candidate	Votes	%	±%
Conservative	Malcolm Hanney *	675	85.1	+12.5
Liberal Democrats	Anne Ledbetter	118	14.9	+4.1
Majority		557	70.2	
Turnout			43.6	
Registered electors		1,820		
Conservative hold		Swing		

=== Chew Valley South ===
Chew Valley South
Party	Candidate	Votes	%	±%
Conservative	Vic Pritchard *	447	65.0	+6.2
Liberal Democrats	Adrian Mark Usher	241	35.0	+16.1
Majority		206	30.0	
Turnout			40.1	
Registered electors		1,729		
Conservative hold		Swing		

=== Clutton ===
Clutton
Party	Candidate	Votes	%	±%
Conservative	Stephen Willcox	405	54.0	+14.2
Labour	Keith Hallett	212	28.3	–18.5
Liberal Democrats	Gillian Dorothy Dunkerley	133	17.7	+4.3
Majority		193	25.7	
Turnout			39.6	
Registered electors		1,900		
Conservative gain from Labour		Swing		

=== Combe Down ===
Combe Down (2 seats)
Party	Candidate	Votes	%	±%
Conservative	Leila Wishart	765	41.3	+9.4
Liberal Democrats	Roger Symonds *	698	37.7	–11.8
Conservative	Alan Robert Garrett	581	–	
Liberal Democrats	Michael James Walter Senior	525	–	
Independent	Jill Attwood	390	–	
Independent	Debra Elaine Shute	114	–	
Turnout			44.2	
Registered electors		3,791		
Conservative gain from Liberal Democrats		Swing		
Liberal Democrats hold		Swing		

=== Farmborough ===
Farmborough
Party	Candidate	Votes	%	±%
Conservative	Sally Davis *	623	76.9	+20.4
Liberal Democrats	William Gordon Melling	187	23.1	+12.0
Majority		436	53.8	
Turnout			40.1	
Registered electors		2,025		
Conservative hold		Swing		

=== High Littleton ===
High Littleton
Party	Candidate	Votes	%	±%
Conservative	Les Kew *	569	77.1	+28.4
Liberal Democrats	Jean Rose Elizabeth Vine	169	22.9	+11.1
Majority		400	54.2	
Turnout			33.4	
Registered electors		2,226		
Conservative hold		Swing		

=== Keynsham East ===
Keynsham East (2 seats)
Party	Candidate	Votes	%	±%
Conservative	Bryan Organ *	1,026	51.8	+7.3
Conservative	Marie Brewer	1,004	–	
Liberal Democrats	Roger Martin Clark	755	38.1	–2.9
Liberal Democrats	Jeanne Barbara Pinkerton	706	–	
Labour	Beverley Michaela Hunt	201	10.1	–4.4
Turnout			44.5	
Registered electors		4,388		
Conservative hold		Swing		
Conservative hold		Swing		

=== Keynsham North ===
Keynsham North (2 seats)
Party	Candidate	Votes	%	±%
Conservative	Charles Gerrish	586	35.6	+14.0
Liberal Democrats	Keith Kirwan	578	35.1	–1.7
Conservative	Brian Simmons	504	–	
Liberal Democrats	John Hudson	495	–	
Labour	Patricia Ann Hogg *	482	29.3	–12.3
Labour	Gordon Arthur Derrick *	463	–	
Turnout			42.1	
Registered electors		3,875		
Conservative gain from Labour		Swing		
Liberal Democrats gain from Labour		Swing		

=== Keynsham South ===
Keynsham South (2 seats)
Party	Candidate	Votes	%	±%
Labour	Adrian Inker *	603	46.6	–20.6
Labour	Hilary Fraser	485	–	
Conservative	Edward Gough	357	27.6	+15.4
Liberal Democrats	Andrew Bryce Halliday	334	25.8	+5.2
Liberal Democrats	Christine Helen Kirwan	318	–	
Conservative	Harvey Nicholas Haeberling	309	–	
Turnout			33.4	
Registered electors		3,847		
Labour hold		Swing		
Labour hold		Swing		

=== Kingsmead ===
Kingsmead (2 seats)
Party	Candidate	Votes	%	±%
Liberal Democrats	Andrew Furse *	615	44.3	–2.4
Liberal Democrats	Carol Paradise	548	–	
Conservative	Christopher John Butt	537	38.7	+0.9
Conservative	Andrew Gordon Borland	532	–	
Green	Eric Lucas	235	16.9	N/A
Turnout			33.9	
Registered electors		3,975		
Liberal Democrats hold		Swing		
Liberal Democrats hold		Swing		

=== Lambridge ===
Lambridge (2 seats)
Party	Candidate	Votes	%	±%
Liberal Democrats	Michael James Kelleher *	630	40.9	–7.6
Conservative	Bryan Chalker	615	39.9	+6.2
Conservative	Glenys Chalker	581	–	
Liberal Democrats	Philip Christopher James	565	–	
Green	Michael Gordon	296	19.2	N/A
Turnout			37.4	
Registered electors		3,938		
Liberal Democrats hold		Swing		
Conservative gain from Liberal Democrats		Swing		

=== Lansdown ===
Lansdown (2 seats)
Party	Candidate	Votes	%	±%
Conservative	David Hawkins *	849	63.7	+6.4
Conservative	Michael John Ringham *	833	–	
Liberal Democrats	Susan Frances Traill	484	36.3	+4.4
Liberal Democrats	Robin Steven Fenwick	480	–	
Turnout			39.9	
Registered electors		3,505		
Conservative hold		Swing		
Conservative hold		Swing		

=== Lyncombe ===
Lyncombe (2 seats)
Party	Candidate	Votes	%	±%
Liberal Democrats	David Bellotti	848	44.4	–16.0
Liberal Democrats	Marian McNeir *	827	–	
Conservative	Elizabeth Marie Dodgson	767	40.2	+9.5
Conservative	Zena Gay Tulyholowycz	680	–	
Green	Wendy Blackman	293	15.4	N/A
Green	Thelma Vivian Grimes	214	–	
Turnout			47.8	
Registered electors		3,984		
Liberal Democrats hold		Swing		
Liberal Democrats hold		Swing		

=== Mendip ===
Mendip
Party	Candidate	Votes	%	±%
Conservative	Tim Warren	418	62.1	+15.1
Labour	Nicholas John Simon Ajderian	153	22.7	–16.9
Liberal Democrats	Andrew John Wait	102	15.2	+1.9
Majority		265	39.4	
Turnout			33.3	
Registered electors		2,032		
Conservative hold		Swing		

=== Midsomer Norton North ===
Midsomer Norton North (2 seats)
Party	Candidate	Votes	%	±%
Liberal Democrats	Jane Margaret Lewis	464	31.7	+14.2
Conservative	Shirley Steel	396	27.0	+8.2
Conservative	Robin John Maggs	379	–	
Labour	Matthew Robert Livsey	366	25.0	–38.7
Liberal Democrats	David Alexander Knapton	296	–	
Labour	Anne Marie Jovic Sas	285	–	
Independent	Julie Mary Moorshead	238	16.3	N/A
Turnout			32.0	
Registered electors		4,085		
Liberal Democrats gain from Labour		Swing		
Conservative gain from Labour		Swing		

=== Midsomer Norton Redfield ===
Midsomer Norton Redfield (2 seats)
Party	Candidate	Votes	%	±%
Conservative	Chris Watt	627	36.4	+10.5
Independent	Betty May Perry	601	34.9	N/A
Conservative	Barry James Gillett	559	–	
Labour Co-op	Fflyff McLaren	493	28.6	–30.3
Labour Co-op	Stewart Edward Weston	270	–	
Turnout			35.8	
Registered electors		3,961		
Conservative gain from Labour		Swing		
Independent gain from Labour		Swing		

=== Newbridge ===
Newbridge (2 seats)
Party	Candidate	Votes	%	±%
Liberal Democrats	Loraine Brinkhurst *	888	57.0	–4.7
Liberal Democrats	Caroline Roberts *	780	–	
Conservative	Robert Peter Baker	669	43.0	+15.7
Conservative	David Elkington	618	–	
Turnout			37.7	
Registered electors		4,210		
Liberal Democrats hold		Swing		
Liberal Democrats hold		Swing		

=== Odd Down ===
Odd Down (2 seats)
Party	Candidate	Votes	%	±%
Liberal Democrats	Steve Hedges *	674	48.2	–12.8
Liberal Democrats	Nigel Roberts *	574	–	
Conservative	Janet Elizabeth McPherson	523	37.4	+22.6
Conservative	Donald Albert Alfons Spearman	442	–	
Labour Co-op	Timothy Edwin Pearce	202	14.4	–9.7
Turnout			35.7	
Registered electors		3,784		
Liberal Democrats hold		Swing		
Liberal Democrats hold		Swing		

=== Oldfield ===
Oldfield (2 seats)
Party	Candidate	Votes	%	±%
Liberal Democrats	Ruth Griffiths *	714	54.7	–2.1
Liberal Democrats	Shaun McGall *	689	–	
Conservative	Audrey Archer	333	25.5	+10.7
Conservative	Colin Frederick Evans	298	–	
Labour Co-op	Karen Ruth Weston	258	19.8	–13.5
Turnout			34.1	
Registered electors		3,767		
Liberal Democrats hold		Swing		
Liberal Democrats hold		Swing		

=== Paulton ===
Paulton (2 seats)
Party	Candidate	Votes	%	±%
Labour	Harriet Joy Ajderian	548	55.1	–16.6
Labour	Brian Colin Barrett *	509	–	
Conservative	William Alan Brown	280	28.1	N/A
Conservative	Joseph Jefferies	202	–	
Liberal Democrats	David Matthews	167	16.8	–2.5
Liberal Democrats	William Gordon Melling	131	–	
Turnout			25.8	
Registered electors		3,883		
Labour hold		Swing		
Labour hold		Swing		

=== Peasedown ===
Peasedown (2 seats)
Party	Candidate	Votes	%	±%
Liberal Democrats	Sarah Bevan	606	45.2	+15.8
Liberal Democrats	Gail Coleshill	597	–	
Labour	Robert Butt	498	37.2	–12.1
Labour	Gael Doswell	356	–	
Conservative	Brian Harbour	236	17.6	–3.7
Conservative	Colleen Patricia Curtis Jefferies	222	–	
Turnout			28.1	
Registered electors		4,600		
Liberal Democrats gain from Labour		Swing		
Liberal Democrats gain from Labour		Swing		

=== Publow with Whitchurch ===
Publow with Whitchurch
Party	Candidate	Votes	%	±%
Conservative	Peter Edwards	360	59.6	+17.6
Labour	Lawrence Hunt	164	27.2	–18.7
Liberal Democrats	Rosalind Dawn Smallwood	80	13.2	+1.1
Majority		196	32.5	
Turnout			32.2	
Registered electors		1,883		
Conservative gain from Labour		Swing		

=== Radstock ===
Radstock (2 seats)
Party	Candidate	Votes	%	±%
Independent	Phyllis Gay *	658	–	
Independent	Jonathan Jeffrey Gay *	461	–	
Labour Co-op	Peter Jovic-Sas *	370	32.1	+0.7
Independent	Allan Brian George Hall	298	–	
Conservative	Gabriel Batt	124	10.8	N/A
Conservative	Sebastien Long	109	–	
Turnout			29.8	
Registered electors		3,810		
Independent gain from Independent Labour		Swing		
Independent gain from Independent Labour		Swing		

=== Saltford ===
Saltford (2 seats)
Party	Candidate	Votes	%	±%
Conservative	Francine Haeberling *	792	66.3	+15.3
Conservative	Gordon Wood *	724	–	
Liberal Democrats	Raymond Buchanan	402	33.7	+20.1
Liberal Democrats	Tony Crouch	334	–	
Turnout			37.0	
Registered electors		3,307		
Conservative hold		Swing		
Conservative hold		Swing		

=== Southdown ===
Southdown (2 seats)
Party	Candidate	Votes	%	±%
Liberal Democrats	Paul Crossley *	619	56.4	–15.7
Liberal Democrats	Dine Romero	618	–	
Conservative	Kenneth Philip Cragg	253	23.0	+11.9
Labour	Grenville Malcolm John Young	226	20.6	+3.8
Conservative	John Grant Ferrie	213	–	
Turnout			30.1	
Registered electors		4,052		
Liberal Democrats hold		Swing		
Liberal Democrats hold		Swing		

=== Timsbury ===
Timsbury
Party	Candidate	Votes	%	±%
Labour	Matthew Neal Davis	485	56.4	–2.6
Conservative	John Kenyon Knibbs	278	32.3	+0.9
Liberal Democrats	Gwendoline Rose Matthews	97	11.3	+1.7
Majority		207	24.1	
Turnout			42.7	
Registered electors		2,029		
Labour hold		Swing		

=== Twerton ===
Twerton (2 seats)
Party	Candidate	Votes	%	±%
Liberal Democrats	Tim Ball *	530	61.5	–10.6
Liberal Democrats	Gerry Curran *	404	–	
Labour Co-op	Margaret Ann Pearce	186	21.6	+1.2
Conservative	Maureen Veronica Bailey	146	16.9	+9.4
Conservative	Roger Smith	125	–	
Turnout			23.5	
Registered electors		3,531		
Liberal Democrats hold		Swing		
Liberal Democrats hold		Swing		

=== Walcot ===
Walcot (2 seats)
Party	Candidate	Votes	%	±%
Liberal Democrats	David Dixon *	556	34.9	–3.9
Liberal Democrats	Colin Darracott	546	–	
Conservative	Susan Elizabeth Francesca Yuille	488	30.7	+5.1
Conservative	William John Yuille	457	–	
Green	Richard Scrase	206	12.9	N/A
Labour	Peter John Robert Norris	198	12.4	–19.2
Labour	Bernard William Morgan	189	–	
Green	Gavin Withers	152	–	
Independent	Andrew Benedict Tanner	143	–	
Independent	Nicholas Hales	50	–	
Turnout			38.2	
Registered electors		4,025		
Liberal Democrats hold		Swing		
Liberal Democrats hold		Swing		

=== Westfield ===
Westfield (2 seats)
Party	Candidate	Votes	%	±%
Independent	Chris Cray	507	–	
Labour	Christopher John Dando	437	40.4	–35.1
Labour	Wayne Teall	432	–	
Independent	Mike Collins	352	–	
Conservative	Mark Terence Davey	138	12.8	N/A
Independent	Barbara Hawking	120	–	
Turnout			25.6	
Registered electors		4,097		
Independent gain from Labour		Swing		
Labour hold		Swing		

=== Westmoreland ===
Westmoreland (2 seats)
Party	Candidate	Votes	%	±%
Liberal Democrats	Sharon Grace Ball *	543	47.1	–6.5
Liberal Democrats	Lynda Hedges *	509	–	
Labour	Gillian Wendy Pitman	373	32.3	–2.1
Labour	Christopher Jones	356	–	
Conservative	Susan Gillian Henley Green	238	20.6	+8.6
Conservative	Gervase Antony Manfred O'Donovan	201	–	
Turnout			31.3	
Registered electors		3,870		
Liberal Democrats hold		Swing		
Liberal Democrats hold		Swing		

=== Weston ===
Weston (2 seats)
Party	Candidate	Votes	%	±%
Liberal Democrats	Timothy John Bullamore *	1,068	50.2	+3.5
Conservative	Colin Barrett	1,061	49.8	+4.5
Liberal Democrats	Peter Andrews	974	–	
Conservative	Malcolm Lees	955	–	
Turnout			50.7	
Registered electors		4,030		
Liberal Democrats hold		Swing		
Conservative gain from Liberal Democrats		Swing		

=== Widcombe ===
Widcombe (2 seats)
Party	Candidate	Votes	%	±%
Liberal Democrats	Peter John Metcalfe *	653	41.8	–13.3
Liberal Democrats	Nicole Mauricette O'Flaherty *	628	–	
Conservative	Martin Robert Sykes	532	34.0	+9.5
Conservative	Brook Whelan	496	–	
Green	Susan Patricia Bradley	229	14.7	+4.5
Green	Thelma Vivian Grimes	219	–	
Labour	Jean Adamson Campbell	149	9.5	–0.7
Labour	Mary Elizabeth Young	149		
Turnout			36.5	
Registered electors		4,029		
Liberal Democrats hold		Swing		
Liberal Democrats hold		Swing		
