= 2023 Bath and North East Somerset Council election =

English local election

- 4 May 2023

All 59 seats to Bath and North East Somerset Council 30 seats needed for a majority
	First party	Second party	Third party
Leader	Kevin Guy	Robin Moss	N/A
Party	Liberal Democrats	Labour	Independent
Leader's seat	Bathavon North	Westfield	N/A
Last election	37 seats, 43.7%	5 seats, 12.6%	6 seats, 5.4%
Seats won	41	7	5
Seat change	▲4	▲2	▼1
Popular vote	40,739	15,256	5,620
	Fourth party	Fifth party
Leader	Vic Pritchard	N/A
Party	Conservative	Green
Leader's seat	Chew Valley (defeated)	N/A
Last election	11 seats, 25.0%	0 seats, 9.3%
Seats won	3	3
Seat change	▼8	▲3
Popular vote	23,121	12,440
- Map showing the results of the 2023 Bath and North East Somerset Council elections. Blue showing Conservative, Red showing Labour, Yellow showing Liberal Democrats, Green showing Green Party and Grey showing Independents. Striped wards have mixed representation.
Leader before election
Kevin Guy
Liberal Democrats
Leader after election
Kevin Guy
Liberal Democrats

The 2023 Bath and North East Somerset Council election was held on 4 May 2023 to elect members of Bath and North East Somerset Council in England

The Liberal Democrats maintained control of the council in 2023, increasing their majority winning forty-one seats. The Conservative leader lost his seat.

== Background ==
The sudden death of Green Party candidate Tim Morgan days before the election caused the ward election for Paulton to be delayed until a later date.

=== Retiring councillors ===
Council Ward	Departing Councillor	Party	Ref
Bathavon South	Neil Butters	Liberal Democrats	
Combe Down	Gerry Curran	Liberal Democrats	
Clutton & Farmborough	Sally Davis	Conservative	
High Littleton	Ryan Wills	Liberal Democrats	
Keynsham North	Vic Clarke	Conservative	
Keynsham South	Lisa O'Brien	Conservative	
Kingsmead	Sue Craig	Liberal Democrats	
Kingsmead	Andy Furse	Liberal Democrats	
Midsomer Norton Redfield	Paul Myers	Independent (Note: Elected in 2019 as a Conservative)	
Midsomer Norton Redfield	Chris Watt	Conservative	
Newbridge	Mark Roper	Liberal Democrats	
Peasedown	Sarah Bevan	Independent	
Saltford	Alastair Singleton	Liberal Democrats	
Walcot	Richard Samuel	Liberal Democrats	
Walcot	Tom Davies	Liberal Democrats	
Weston	Shelley Bromley	Liberal Democrats	
Widcombe & Lyncombe	Winston Duguid	Liberal Democrats	

== Council composition ==
After the previous election the composition of the council was:

↓
37	11	6	5
LD	Con	I	Lab

Prior to the election the composition of the council was:

↓
36	10	7	5	1
LD	Con	I	Lab	G

Following the election the composition of the council was:

↓
41	7	5	3	3
LD	Lab	I	Con	G

== Results summary ==
Bath and North East Somerset Council election, 2023
Party	Candidates						Votes		
Party	Stood	Elected	Gained	Unseated	Net	% of total	%	No.	Net %
Liberal Democrats	59	41	7	3	▲4	69.5%	41.9%	40,739	-1.8
Labour	59	7	2	0	▲2	11.9%	15.7%	15,256	+3.1
Independent	13	5	1	2	▼1	8.5%	5.8%	5,620	+0.4
Conservative	59	3	0	8	▼8	5.1%	23.8%	23,121	-1.2
Green	59	3	3	0	▲3	5.1%	12.8%	12,440	+3.5

Voter turnout was down from 40.76% at the 2019 local elections. Of eligible in-person voters, 0.02% were unable to show correct photo identity to vote under the new rules introduced at this election. 85 of the 141 intending voters initially rejected returned later with a correct photo identity document.

== Ward results ==
Sitting councillors are marked with an asterisk (*).

=== Bathavon North ===
Bathavon North (2 seats)
Party	Candidate	Votes	%	±%
Liberal Democrats	Elizabeth Sarah Warren *	1,460	55.1	+4.7
Liberal Democrats	Kevin Ronald Guy *	1,350	50.1	+5.2
Conservative	Peter Graham Sandell Davis	681	25.7	+1.5
Conservative	Martin John Beresford Veal	671	25.3	+15.4
Green	Eleanor Field	296	11.2	N/A
Green	Leila Froud	269	10.1	−4.0
Labour	Vicky Linda Drew	245	9.2	+3.4
Labour	Dick Smith	204	7.7	+4.5
Turnout		2,666	48.56	–3.07
Registered electors		5,490		
Liberal Democrats hold		Swing		
Liberal Democrats hold		Swing		

=== Bathavon South ===
Bathavon South (2 seats)
Party	Candidate	Votes	%	±%
Liberal Democrats	Fiona Grace Gourley	1,039	53.1	±0.0
Liberal Democrats	Matt McCabe *	1,028	52.6	+9.9
Conservative	Chris Davies	567	29.0	+5.6
Conservative	Peter Gordon Hunt	535	27.4	+4.9
Green	Anne Coghlan	211	10.8	−8.5
Green	Martin Phillips	179	9.2	N/A
Labour	John Anthony Bull	127	6.5	−0.6
Labour	Delyth Morris	111	5.7	N/A
Turnout		1,962	46.53	–4.52
Registered electors		4,217		
Liberal Democrats hold		Swing		
Liberal Democrats hold		Swing		

=== Bathwick ===
Bathwick (2 seats)
Party	Candidate	Votes	%	±%
Liberal Democrats	Manda Rigby *	1,304	53.3	+0.2
Liberal Democrats	Toby Simon	1,023	41.8	−6.6
Conservative	Yukteshwar Kumar *	712	29.1	−19.3
Conservative	Mark Patrick Mac Donnell	674	27.5	+1.2
Green	Michael Coffey	347	14.2	−1.4
Green	Katherine Snook	251	10.3	N/A
Labour	Kodi Damien Sean McBride	227	9.3	
Labour	Lesley Kathleen Bees	224	9.2	+3.2
Turnout		2,456	51.23	+5.04
Registered electors		4,792		
Liberal Democrats hold		Swing		
Liberal Democrats hold		Swing		

=== Chew Valley ===
Chew Valley (2 seats)
Party	Candidate	Votes	%	±%
Liberal Democrats	Anna Victoria Box	1,104	52.4	+22.7
Liberal Democrats	Dave Harding	1,104	52.4	+25.8
Conservative	Victor Lewis Pritchard *	694	33.0	−17.7
Conservative	Karen Ruth Warrington *	576	19.8	−19.5
Labour	Richard Peter Evershed	168	8.0	−2.1
Green	Isobel Russell	151	7.2	−15.9
Green	Guy Adrian Norfolk	146	6.9	N/A
Labour	Jonathan Samuel Wallcroft	104	4.9	N/A
Turnout		2,111	44.65	+5.18
Registered electors		4,728		
Liberal Democrats gain from Conservative		Swing		
Liberal Democrats gain from Conservative		Swing		

=== Clutton & Farmborough ===
Clutton & Farmborough
Party	Candidate	Votes	%	±%
Green	Sam Ross	609	55.2	+29.9
Conservative	Rosemary Naish	329	29.9	−11.3
Labour	William Ralph Feltham	88	8.0	+2.4
Liberal Democrats	Charlotte Sarah Buxton	76	6.9	−20.9
Majority		280	25.4	N/A
Turnout		1,104	44.99	+5.29
Registered electors		2,454		
Green gain from Conservative		Swing		

=== Combe Down ===
Combe Down (2 seats)
Party	Candidate	Votes	%	±%
Liberal Democrats	Bharat Ramji Nathoo Pankhania *	1,254	53.2	+10.8
Liberal Democrats	Onkar Saini	1,154	49.0	+12.4
Conservative	Bob Goodman	754	32.0	−1.5
Conservative	Steve Merrifield	672	28.5	+2.8
Green	Amy Alsop	328	13.9	N/A
Green	David Andrews	164	7.0	−16.3
Labour	Tom Battersby	158	6.7	−0.2
Labour	Marie Louise Youngman	149	6.3	−0.4
Turnout		2,362	50.98	+3.34
Registered electors		4,633		
Liberal Democrats hold		Swing		
Liberal Democrats hold		Swing		

=== High Littleton ===
High Littleton
Party	Candidate	Votes	%	±%
Liberal Democrats	Ann Margaret Morgan	371	40.9	−16.9
Conservative	Jess Quinn	318	35.1	+4.0
Labour	Martine Duggan	161	17.8	+13.1
Green	Kiaran Jay	57	6.3	−0.2
Majority		53	5.8	
Turnout		912	38.11	–5.50
Registered electors		2,393		
Liberal Democrats hold		Swing		

=== Keynsham East ===
Keynsham East (2 seats)
Party	Candidate	Votes	%	±%
Liberal Democrats	Andy Wait *	1,191	57.3	+2.7
Liberal Democrats	Hal MacFie *	1,143	55.0	+2.7
Conservative	Jo Davis	548	26.3	−3.1
Conservative	George Amanda Joy Morgan	548	26.3	−2.6
Labour	Rachael Eileen King	185	8.9	+0.8
Labour	Derek Stephen Hart	179	8.6	+1.8
Green	Jennifer Peters	166	8.0	N/A
Green	Jo Taylor	108	5.2	N/A
Turnout		2,091	43.93	–1.02
Registered electors		4,759		
Liberal Democrats hold		Swing		
Liberal Democrats hold		Swing		

=== Keynsham North ===
Keynsham North (2 seats)
Party	Candidate	Votes	%	±%
Liberal Democrats	Alex Paul Beaumont	914	52.9	+29.7
Liberal Democrats	George Leach	697	40.3	+18.5
Conservative	Brian Simmons *	470	27.2	−13.3
Conservative	Allan Melville Sinclair	401	23.2	−13.3
Labour	Christopher Jeffery Davis	315	18.2	−8.7
Labour	Kai-Ashley Sean Vivian Fletcher	234	13.5	−13.1
Green	Edmund Stuart Cannon	185	10.7	N/A
Green	Justin Nigel Edwards	147	8.5	N/A
Turnout		1,746	34.82	+0.60
Registered electors		5,014		
Liberal Democrats gain from Conservative		Swing		
Liberal Democrats gain from Conservative		Swing		

=== Keynsham South ===
Keynsham South (2 seats)
Party	Candidate	Votes	%	±%
Conservative	Alan Dudley Hale *	668	39.6	−3.3
Labour	David William Biddleston	666	39.5	+11.5
Labour	Olivia Ellen Copley	520	30.8	+11.6
Conservative	Daniel Patrick Condick	464	27.5	−2.2
Green	Erica Mary Davies	269	15.9	−2.2
Liberal Democrats	Alan Keith Greenfield	254	15.0	+3.5
Liberal Democrats	Souzan Ibrahim Abdelnabi Alenshasy	172	10.2	+1.8
Green	Steve Murray	160	9.5	N/A
Turnout		1,702	31.38	+0.03
Registered electors		5,423		
Conservative hold		Swing		
Labour gain from Conservative		Swing		

=== Kingsmead ===
Kingsmead (2 seats)
Party	Candidate	Votes	%	±%
Liberal Democrats	Paul Roper	599	40.4	−5.3
Liberal Democrats	George Oliver Tomlin	591	39.8	−2.3
Labour	Tamsin Egan	430	29.0	+2.3
Labour	William Christopher Moule	295	19.9	+2.7
Conservative	Patrick Michael Anketell-Jones	274	18.5	+3.9
Conservative	Michael Roy Killpartrick	272	18.3	+4.8
Green	Jo-Anne Lord	236	15.9	N/A
Green	Eric Lucas	200	13.5	−5.1
Turnout		1,494	38.64	–0.21
Registered electors		3,866		
Liberal Democrats hold		Swing		
Liberal Democrats hold		Swing		

=== Lambridge ===
Lambridge (2 seats)
Party	Candidate	Votes	%	±%
Green	Joanna Wright *	1,120	48.5	+2.2
Green	Saskia Heijltjes	921	39.9	+15.9
Liberal Democrats	Rob Appleyard *	683	29.6	−15.6
Liberal Democrats	Alex Saunders	467	20.2	−26.1
Conservative	David Michael Ferris	398	17.2	+3.4
Conservative	Paul Anthony Toombs	337	14.6	+1.3
Labour	Paula Joan Black	301	13.0	−7.0
Labour	Steve Casemore	275	11.9	−5.5
Turnout		2,315	52.99	+0.65
Registered electors		4,369		
Green gain from Liberal Democrats		Swing		
Green gain from Liberal Democrats		Swing		

=== Lansdown ===
Lansdown (2 seats)
Party	Candidate	Votes	%	±%
Liberal Democrats	Lucy Jane Hodge *	1,023	50.3	−4.8
Liberal Democrats	Mark William Elliott *	917	45.1	−4.1
Conservative	Justin Lawrence Draeger	712	34.9	+8.4
Conservative	Manuel Emilio Pimentel-Reid	667	32.8	+7.3
Green	Grace Wiltshire	219	10.8	−3.6
Green	Tom Pateman	174	8.6	N/A
Labour	Susan Elizabeth Milner	164	8.1	+0.5
Labour	John Stuart McStravick	122	6.0	N/A
Turnout		2,038	44.83	–5.37
Registered electors		4,546		
Liberal Democrats hold		Swing		
Liberal Democrats hold		Swing		

=== Mendip ===
Mendip
Party	Candidate	Votes	%	±%
Liberal Democrats	David Wood *	824	75.3	+8.3
Conservative	Jon Elford	179	16.4	−11.7
Green	Charles Harrison Fenn	50	4.6	N/A
Labour	Jo Thorne	41	3.7	−1.2
Majority		645	59.0	
Turnout		1,095	46.79	–7.28
Registered electors		2,340		
Liberal Democrats hold		Swing		

=== Midsomer Norton North ===
Midsomer Norton North (2 seats)
Party	Candidate	Votes	%	±%
Independent	Shaun Hughes *	462	35.7	+1.4
Liberal Democrats	Michael Colin Douglas Auton	410	31.6	+9.3
Liberal Democrats	Katt Howells	314	24.2	+2.9
Conservative	Mathew James	273	21.0	−11.5
Labour	Fflyff McLaren	239	18.4	+2.0
Conservative	Les Kew	220	17.0	−2.4
Independent	Carol May Clifford	204	15.7	N/A
Labour	David Robert Lee	185	14.3	−4.1
Green	Barbara Gordon	97	7.5	−8.9
Green	Shane Dalzell	71	5.5	N/A
Turnout		1,304	30.12	+0.12
Registered electors		4,330		
Independent hold		Swing		
Liberal Democrats gain from Conservative		Swing		

=== Midsomer Norton Redfield ===
Midsomer Norton Redfield (2 seats)
Party	Candidate	Votes	%	±%
Conservative	Sarah Elizabeth Evans	518	39.4	−18.0
Conservative	Tim Warren	409	31.1	−14.8
Labour	Richard James Stelling	324	24.7	+4.5
Independent	Martin John Thatcher	274	20.9	N/A
Labour	Anne Priest	262	19.9	N/A
Independent	Gordon Charles MacKay	202	15.4	N/A
Liberal Democrats	Claire Veronica Jackson	140	10.7	+1.4
Liberal Democrats	Sharon Grace Ball	134	10.2	+3.5
Green	Annette Knox-Fraser	85	6.5	−12.3
Independent	Chris Griffiths	79	6.0	N/A
Green	Pat Roscow	72	5.5	N/A
Turnout		1,322	26.54	–3.88
Registered electors		4,982		
Conservative hold		Swing		
Conservative hold		Swing		

=== Moorlands ===
Moorlands
Party	Candidate	Votes	%	±%
Liberal Democrats	Jess David *	547	55.9	−5.4
Conservative	Roy Andrew Hayward	220	22.5	+6.7
Labour	Ben Carr	127	13.0	−0.5
Green	Tim Beadle	84	8.6	−0.8
Majority		327	33.4	
Turnout		981	40.04	–2.96
Registered electors		2,450		
Liberal Democrats hold		Swing		

=== Newbridge ===
Newbridge (2 seats)
Party	Candidate	Votes	%	±%
Liberal Democrats	Michelle Anne O'Doherty *	1,048	52.8	−11.6
Liberal Democrats	Samantha Jane Kelly	895	45.1	−6.5
Conservative	David Miller Workman	469	23.6	+3.0
Conservative	Mattia Cuberli	466	23.5	−2.5
Labour	Pam Richards	282	14.2	+7.9
Labour	Roger David Chapman	257	12.9	+6.9
Green	Kelsey Hoppe	250	12.6	−3.2
Green	Mohamed Sharaf	170	8.6	N/A
Turnout		1,991	43.65	–3.51
Registered electors		4,561		
Liberal Democrats hold		Swing		
Liberal Democrats hold		Swing		

=== Odd Down ===
Odd Down (2 seats)
Party	Candidate	Votes	%	±%
Liberal Democrats	Steve Hedges *	1,000	55.5	+1.0
Liberal Democrats	Joel Edwin Hirst *	989	54.9	+3.5
Conservative	Jasper Becker	367	20.4	+8.5
Conservative	Michael James Clarkson	352	19.5	+6.6
Green	Kathy Anne Beadle	266	14.8	−10.5
Labour	Mary Patricia Flitton	196	10.9	−4.8
Green	Ellie Maher	194	10.8	−10.1
Labour	Liz Vincent	183	10.2	N/A
Turnout		1,811	35.68	–3.74
Registered electors		5,075		
Liberal Democrats hold		Swing		
Liberal Democrats hold		Swing		

=== Oldfield Park ===
Oldfield Park
Party	Candidate	Votes	%	±%
Liberal Democrats	Ian Halsall	438	43.5	−30.3
Independent	John Philip Branston	236	23.4	N/A
Conservative	Ronaldo Dia Butrus	149	14.8	+4.3
Green	Anne Phipps	95	9.4	±0.0
Labour	Rose Battey	90	8.9	+2.7
Majority		202	20.1	
Turnout		1,009	48.67	+0.42
Registered electors		2,073		
Liberal Democrats hold		Swing		

=== Paulton ===
The sudden death of Green Party candidate Tim Morgan days before the election caused this ward election to be delayed until Thursday 22 June. A minute's silence was held prior to the start of the count for the other wards.

Paulton (2 seats)
Party	Candidate	Votes	%	±%
Labour	Liz Hardman *	703	73.4	+11.1
Labour	Grant Christopher Johnson *	645	67.3	+18.7
Conservative	Alex James Frost	178	18.6	+4.9
Conservative	Deirdre Mary Horstmann	122	12.7	−0.2
Green	Deborah Brosnan	69	7.2	N/A
Liberal Democrats	Melanie Jane Bullard	55	5.7	−2.9
Liberal Democrats	Belinda Mary Gornall	52	5.4	−0.6
Green	Edward Arnall-Culliford	51	5.3	N/A
Turnout		961	19.79	
Registered electors		4,855		
Labour hold		Swing		
Labour hold		Swing		

=== Peasedown ===
Peasedown (2 seats)
Party	Candidate	Votes	%	±%
Independent	Karen Francine Walker *	615	41.9	−5.6
Independent	Gavin John Heathcote	504	34.3	−15.9
Labour	Jonathan Paul Rich	430	29.3	+14.3
Conservative	Kathy Thomas	344	23.4	+3.5
Labour	Fiona Marie Carr	343	23.3	+13.9
Conservative	Julie Ann Goodwin	219	14.9	−7.9
Liberal Democrats	Ray Love	126	8.6	−2.0
Green	Matt Cooper	105	7.1	N/A
Green	David König	97	6.6	−4.3
Liberal Democrats	Tex Clarke	95	6.5	+0.9
Turnout		1,469	29.44	–4.08
Registered electors		4,989		
Independent hold		Swing		
Independent gain from Independent		Swing		

=== Publow with Whitchurch ===
Publow with Whitchurch
Party	Candidate	Votes	%	±%
Liberal Democrats	Paul May *	537	61.9	+55.0
Conservative	Jennie Jones	209	24.1	−35.5
Green	Laurence Guy	70	8.1	−10.0
Labour	Michael John Simmons	52	6.0	−9.4
Majority		328	37.8	
Turnout		868	36.58	–1.01
Registered electors		2,373		
Liberal Democrats gain from Conservative		Swing		

=== Radstock ===
Radstock (2 seats)
Party	Candidate	Votes	%	±%
Labour Co-op	Christopher John Dando *	527	42.1	+14.2
Labour Co-op	Lesley Ann Mansell	442	35.3	+10.3
Liberal Democrats	Bruce Andrew Shearn *	330	26.4	−0.8
Conservative	Rupert Stephen Jude Bevan	237	18.9	−1.8
Liberal Democrats	Hermione Rose Peace	226	18.1	+0.4
Green	Dom Tristram	218	17.4	−1.4
Green	Liam Michael Kirby	214	17.1	N/A
Conservative	Shaun Anthony Goodwin	188	15.0	+0.7
Turnout		1,257	28.12	–6.95
Registered electors		4,470		
Labour Co-op hold		Swing		
Labour Co-op gain from Liberal Democrats		Swing		

=== Saltford ===
Saltford (2 seats)
Party	Candidate	Votes	%	±%
Liberal Democrats	Duncan Stuart Hounsell *	1,058	50.7	−3.6
Liberal Democrats	Alison Lisa Streatfeild-James	676	32.4	−13.2
Independent	Christopher John Warren	643	30.8	N/A
Conservative	Andy Busby	548	26.3	−11.1
Conservative	Helen Irene Crew	372	17.8	−17.2
Labour	Joan Liley	211	10.1	+3.4
Green	Emily Unsworth-White	177	8.5	−3.1
Labour	Leon Charles Telford	156	7.5	N/A
Green	John William Christian	135	6.5	N/A
Turnout		2,090	44.61	+1.83
Registered electors		4,685		
Liberal Democrats hold		Swing		
Liberal Democrats hold		Swing		

=== Southdown ===
Southdown (2 seats)
Party	Candidate	Votes	%	±%
Liberal Democrats	Dine Romero *	682	36.7	−22.4
Liberal Democrats	Paul Nigel Crossley *	642	34.5	−19.3
Independent	Mark Ian Reynolds	543	29.2	N/A
Independent	Paul Andrew Wakenshaw	480	25.8	N/A
Labour	David William Musgrave	228	12.3	−9.2
Green	Alex Avard	213	11.5	−14.5
Conservative	David Andrew Blatchford	209	11.2	−1.6
Green	Lisa Loverdige	196	10.5	N/A
Labour	Ashley James Lewis	187	10.1	N/A
Conservative	Lyn Jacobs	149	7.9	−3.8
Turnout		1,859	38.35	+0.51
Registered electors		4,858		
Liberal Democrats hold		Swing		
Liberal Democrats hold		Swing		

=== Timsbury ===
Timsbury
Party	Candidate	Votes	%	±%
Liberal Democrats	Shaun Stephenson-McGall **	667	70.1	+56.6
Conservative	Carole Diane Fitzpatrick	163	17.1	+1.9
Labour Co-op	James David Coldwell	72	7.6	−4.4
Green	Chris Allsop	50	5.3	N/A
Majority		504	53.0	
Turnout		954	45.84	+8.63
Registered electors		2,081		
Liberal Democrats gain from Independent		Swing		

Shaun Andrew Stephenson-McGall was a sitting councillor for Oldfield Park ward.

=== Twerton ===
Twerton (2 seats)
Party	Candidate	Votes	%	±%
Liberal Democrats	Tim Ball *	583	54.8	−11.6
Liberal Democrats	Sarah Jane Moore *	560	52.6	−4.6
Labour	Sam Hodgson	228	21.4	−2.0
Labour	Paul James Morgan	202	19.0	+0.3
Conservative	Qamar Rafiq	157	14.8	+8.1
Conservative	Jordan Luke Ray Sweeny	133	12.5	+6.9
Green	Luanne Thornton	99	9.3	−1.6
Green	Jack Wolf	89	8.4	N/A
Turnout		1,069	23.08	–5.85
Registered electors		4,631		
Liberal Democrats hold		Swing		
Liberal Democrats hold		Swing		

=== Walcot ===
Walcot (2 seats)
Party	Candidate	Votes	%	±%
Liberal Democrats	Oli Henman	699	39.2	−19.4
Liberal Democrats	John Leach	571	32.0	−19.9
Labour	Paul Tom Edward Tucker	456	25.5	+9.7
Green	Ben Mulhearn	450	25.2	−1.0
Labour	Dhruv Sachin Kadam	431	24.1	+11.6
Conservative	Hannah Ruth Downey	299	16.8	+2.6
Conservative	Stuart Laurence Kay	293	16.4	+2.9
Green	Ross Turmel	289	16.2	N/A
Turnout		1,790	42.36	–0.07
Registered electors		4,226		
Liberal Democrats hold		Swing		
Liberal Democrats hold		Swing		

=== Westfield ===
Westfield (2 seats)
Party	Candidate	Votes	%	±%
Labour	Eleanor Margaret Jackson *	579	54.8	+11.6
Labour	Robin Moss *	572	54.2	+9.3
Conservative	Michael Evans **	230	21.8	+7.4
Conservative	Margaret Rose Brewer	207	19.6	+2.4
Liberal Democrats	Olivia Leydenfrost	134	12.7	+3.8
Green	James Froud	114	10.8	−12.2
Liberal Democrats	Kiran Rupa Kataria	110	10.4	+3.4
Green	Florence Okowa	100	9.5	N/A
Turnout		1,061	22.16	–0.46
Registered electors		4,787		
Labour hold		Swing		
Labour hold		Swing		

Michael Evans was a sitting councillor for Midsomer Norton North ward.

=== Westmoreland ===
Westmoreland (2 seats)
Party	Candidate	Votes	%	±%
Independent	June Player *	839	57.7	−1.5
Independent	Colin David Blackburn *	539	37.1	−3.7
Liberal Democrats	Sasmita Rajhansha	309	21.3	−8.8
Green	Nick Batt	255	17.5	+2.7
Liberal Democrats	Katherine Frances Hall	240	16.5	−10.0
Green	Stephanie Boxall	165	11.3	N/A
Labour	Rebecca Ruth Simmons	132	9.1	±0.0
Labour	Cate Lewis	119	8.2	N/A
Conservative	Lindsay Sally Whitmore	102	7.0	+1.4
Conservative	Andrew Edwin Charles Pattie	99	6.8	+2.5
Turnout		1,460	40.76	+2.40
Registered electors		3,582		
Independent hold		Swing		
Independent hold		Swing		

=== Weston ===
Weston (2 seats)
Party	Candidate	Votes	%	±%
Liberal Democrats	Ruth Madeleine Malloy *	1,127	53.3	+2.5
Liberal Democrats	Malcolm John Treby	959	45.3	−9.0
Conservative	Graham Martin Pristo	698	33.0	+6.1
Conservative	Martin Reynold Roberto Grixoni	644	30.4	+6.5
Green	Antony Stuart Dobson	219	10.3	−5.5
Labour	Julie Ann Williams	168	7.9	−1.1
Labour	Elaeth Samuel Myers-McCraw	162	7.7	N/A
Green	John Neville	152	7.2	N/A
Turnout		2,123	48.28	–1.93
Registered electors		4,397		
Liberal Democrats hold		Swing		
Liberal Democrats hold		Swing		

=== Widcombe & Lyncombe ===
Widcombe & Lyncombe (2 seats)
Party	Candidate	Votes	%	±%
Liberal Democrats	Alison Patricia Sian Born *	1,463	59.1	−8.5
Liberal Democrats	Deborah Joan Collins	1,288	52.0	+0.7
Conservative	Louisa Sarah McFarland	557	22.5	−0.6
Conservative	Priya Chathley	503	20.3	−0.4
Green	Lyn Barham	387	15.6	−6.7
Green	Ruth Shaw	299	12.1	N/A
Labour	Charlotte Goodfellow Foster	197	8.0	−0.7
Labour	Christina Joan Ryan	176	7.1	N/A
Turnout		2,486	50.50	–5.59
Registered electors		4,923		
Liberal Democrats hold		Swing		
Liberal Democrats hold		Swing		

== Changes 2023–2027 ==
=== By-elections ===
==== Saltford ====
The Saltford by-election was triggered by the resignation of Liberal Democrat councillor Alison Streatfeild-James after she took a position with the Financial Conduct Authority, which prevented her from holding political office.

Saltford By-Election: 16 January 2025
Party	Candidate	Votes	%	±%
Independent	Christopher John Warren	587	29.8	−1.0
Liberal Democrats	Hossein Pirooz	583	29.6	−2.8
Conservative	Andrew David Busby	375	19.0	−7.3
Reform	Daniel Patrick Condick	205	10.4	N/A
Green	Luanne Thornton	159	8.1	−0.4
Labour	Jane Emma Giddins	60	3.0	−7.1
Majority		4	0.2	N/A
Turnout		1,973	40.25	–4.32
Registered electors		4,897		
Independent gain from Liberal Democrats		Swing		

==== Mendip ====
The Mendip by-election was triggered by the resignation of councillor David Wood.

Mendip By-Election: 3 July 2025
Party	Candidate	Votes	%	±%
Liberal Democrats	Simon James McCombe	496	57.1	–18.2
Reform	Stuart Michael Ball	191	22.0	N/A
Conservative	Jon Elford	84	9.7	–6.7
Green	Charles Harrison Fenn	57	6.6	+2.0
Labour	Martin Edward Burton	40	4.6	+0.9
Majority		305	35.1	–23.9
Turnout		868	37.53	–9.26
Registered electors		2,313		
Liberal Democrats hold				

==== Widcombe & Lyncombe ====
The Widcombe & Lyncombe by-election was triggered by the resignation of councillor Deborah Collins.

Widcombe & Lyncombe By-Election: 9 October 2025
Party	Candidate	Votes	%	±%
Liberal Democrats	Stuart Pieter Bridge	769	44.4	–14.7
Green	Neil Howard	267	15.4	–0.2
Labour	Helen Torrance	212	12.2	+4.2
Reform	Aaron Scott	206	11.9	N/A
Conservative	Matt Corner	149	8.6	–13.9
Independent	Casey Bernard Bailey Nolan	83	4.8	N/A
Independent	Madeline Blackburn	45	2.6	N/A
Majority		502	29.0	N/A
Turnout		1,737	35	–15.5
Liberal Democrats hold				
