= Bath and North East Somerset Council =

English local government council

- Whole council elected every four years

Type
- Type: Unitary authority

History
- Founded: 1 April 1996

Leadership
- Chair: Shaun Stephenson-McGall, Liberal Democrat since 14 May 2026
- Leader: Kevin Guy, Liberal Democrat since 4 May 2021
- Chief Executive: Sophie Broadfield since 1 January 2026

Structure
- Seats: 59 councillors
- Political groups: Administration (38) Liberal Democrats (38) Other parties (21) Independent (10) Labour (6) Green (3) Conservative (2)
- Joint committees: West of England Combined Authority
- Length of term: 4 years

Elections
- Voting system: First past the post
- Last election: 4 May 2023
- Next election: 6 May 2027

Meeting place
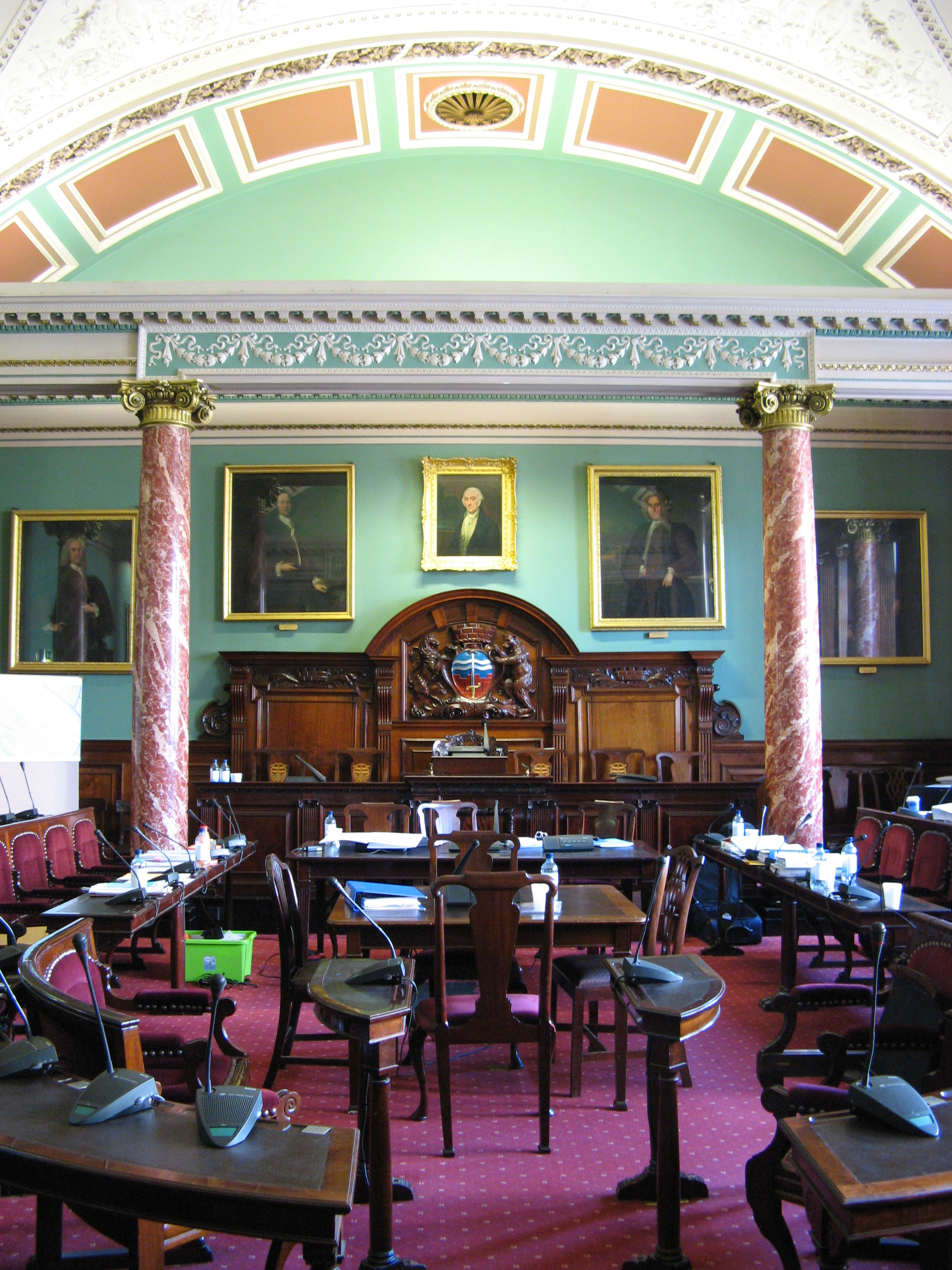
- Guildhall, High Street, Bath, BA1 5AW

Website
- beta.bathnes.gov.uk

Bath and North East Somerset Council is the local authority for Bath and North East Somerset, a local government district in the ceremonial county of Somerset, England. The council is a unitary authority, being a district council which also performs the functions of a county council. Since 2017 the council has been a member of the West of England Combined Authority.

The council has been under Liberal Democrat majority control since 2019. It meets at the Guildhall in Bath, and has offices in Bath, Keynsham and Midsomer Norton.

== History ==
The district of Bath and North East Somerset and its council were created in 1996. The new district covered the area of two former districts, both of which were abolished at the same time: Wansdyke and Bath. Both had been lower-tier districts within the county of Avon prior to the 1996 reforms, with Avon County Council providing county-level services to the area.

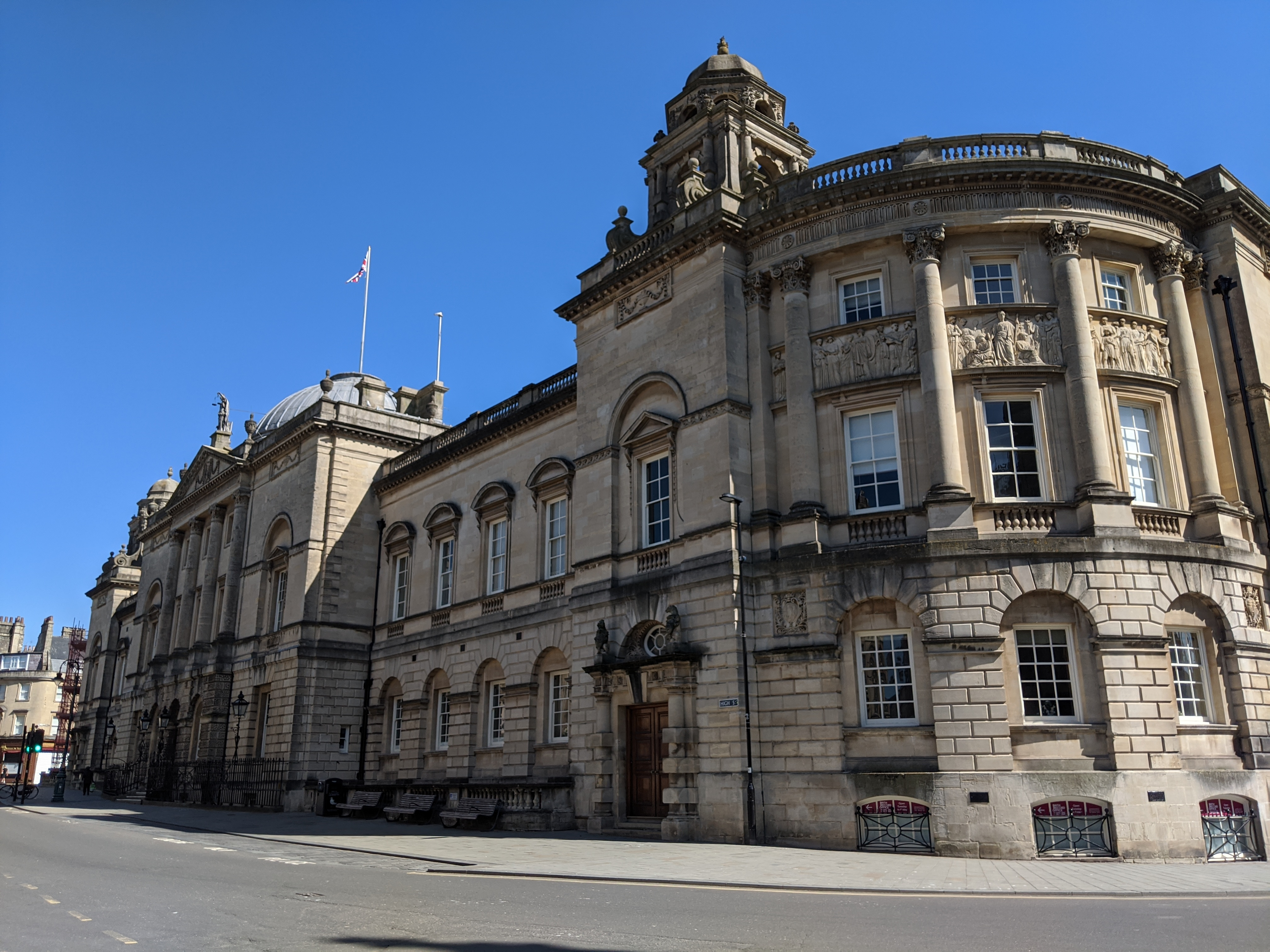
Guildhall, Bath: council's meeting place

Wansdyke and Avon had both been created in 1974 under the Local Government Act 1972 and so were only in existence for 22 years. The city of Bath was an ancient borough, with its earliest known charter dating from 1189. Bath had been reformed to become a municipal borough in 1836 under the Municipal Corporations Act 1835. When elected county councils were established in 1889, Bath was considered large enough to provide its own county-level services, and so it became a county borough, independent from the new Somerset County Council, whilst remaining part of the geographical county of Somerset.

The area that would become Bath and North East Somerset was transferred from Somerset to the new non-metropolitan county of Avon in 1974. Avon was abolished in 1996 and four unitary authorities established to govern the former county. The way the 1996 change was implemented was to create both a non-metropolitan district and non-metropolitan county called Bath and North East Somerset, covering the combined area of the city of Bath and Wansdyke district, but with no separate county council. Instead, the district council also performs the functions that legislation assigns to county councils, making it a unitary authority. At the same time, the new district was transferred for ceremonial purposes back to Somerset, but as a unitary authority the council has always been independent from Somerset Council (known as Somerset County Council prior to 2023).

In 2000, the council became the legal successor in a racial discrimination case originally brought against the former Wansdyke District Council. Kelly Davis, a Black builder from Bath, successfully challenged repeated planning refusals from 1989 to 1991. A judge found that planning officers had acted in a “consistently unhelpful and obstructive fashion,” and concluded this was likely because Davis was “the only Black builder in Wansdyke.”

In 1999 the council housing in the area was transferred to the charitable Somer Community Housing Trust, which was later to become Curo.

Following a petition, a referendum was held in 2016 proposing a directly elected mayor for the Bath and North East Somerset district. The proposal was rejected by 78.1% of voters.

== Governance ==
Bath and North East Somerset Council provides both district-level and county-level functions. Some strategic functions in the area are provided by the West of England Combined Authority; the leader of the council sits on the combined authority as Bath and North East Somerset's representative. Much of the district is covered by civil parishes, which form an additional tier of local government for their areas. The exception is Bath, which is unparished. Instead of having a parish council, the Bath and North East Somerset councillors who represent wards in Bath act as charter trustees to preserve Bath's city status and mayoralty.

=== Political control ===
The council has been under Liberal Democrat majority control since 2019.

The first election to the council was held in 1995, initially operating as a shadow authority alongside the area's outgoing authorities until 1 April 1996 when the new district and its council formally came into being. Political control of the council since 1996 has been as follows:

Party in control	Years
No overall control	1996–2015
Conservative	2015–2019
Liberal Democrats	2019–present

=== Leadership ===
For its first six years, the council did not appoint a leader of the council. The role was introduced in 2002, since when the leaders have been:

Councillor	Party	From	To
Paul Crossley	Liberal Democrats	9 May 2002	May 2007
Francine Haeberling	Conservative	17 May 2007	19 May 2011
Paul Crossley	Liberal Democrats	19 May 2011	21 May 2015
Tim Warren	Conservative	21 May 2015	May 2019
Dine Romero	Liberal Democrats	21 May 2019	1 Apr 2021
Kevin Guy	Liberal Democrats	4 May 2021	

=== Composition ===
Following the 2023 election, and subsequent changes of allegiance and by-elections up to July 2026, the composition of the council was:

Party	Councillors
Liberal Democrats	38
Independent	10
Labour	6
Green	3
Conservative	2
Total	59

Five of the independent councillors sit together as the "Independents Group", two form the "Independents for B&NES" group, and three are "unaligned". The next election is due in May 2027.

== Elections ==
Since the last boundary changes in 2019, the council has comprised 59 councillors representing 33 wards, with each ward electing one or two councillors. Elections are held every four years.

== Premises ==
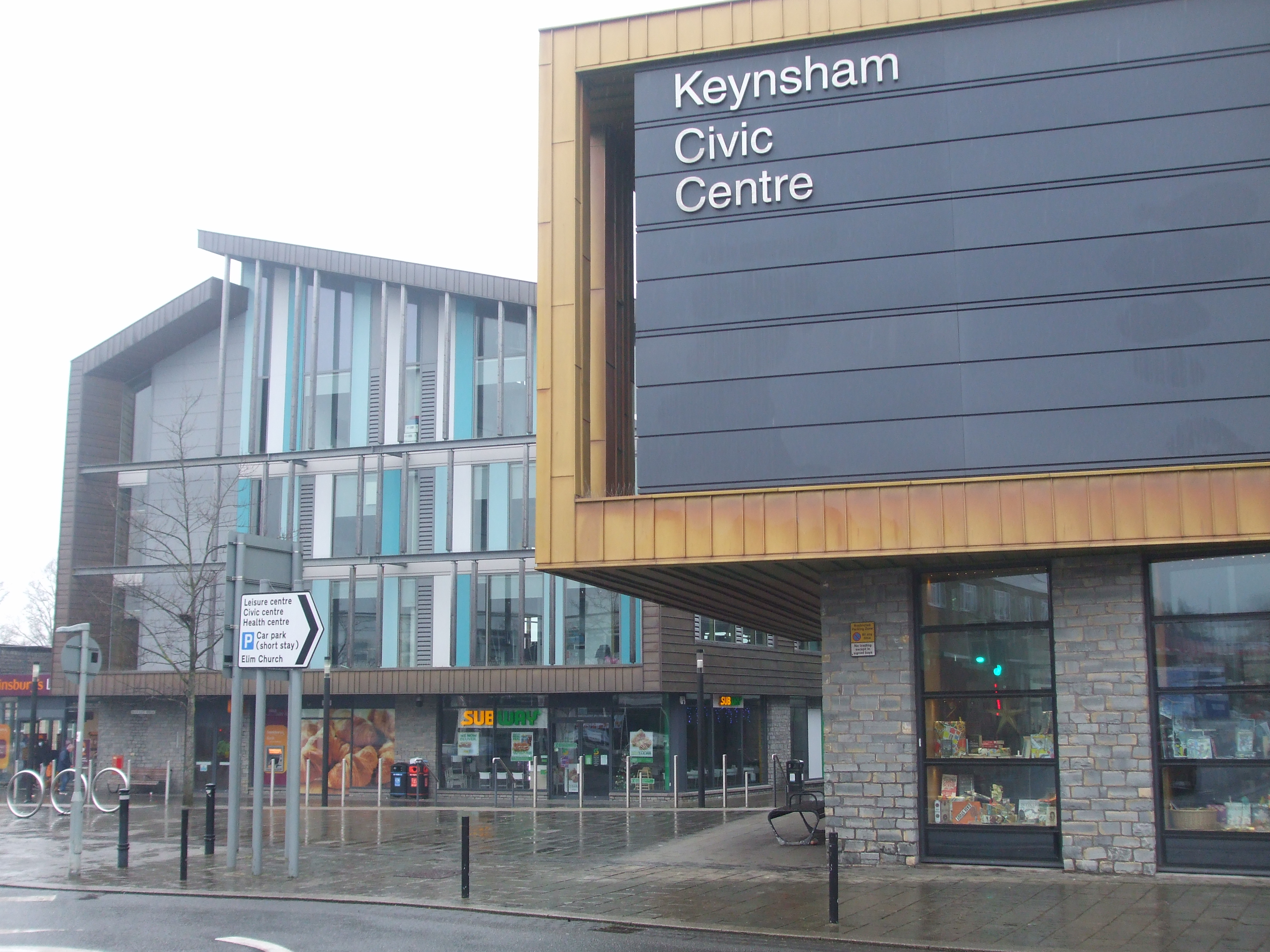
Keynsham Civic Centre, one of the council's offices

Council meetings are generally held at the Guildhall on High Street in the centre of Bath. The building was first completed in 1778, and was subsequently extended in the 1890s to include municipal offices for Bath City Council.

The modern council's administrative offices are split between several sites, notably including:

- Lewis House at 3-4 Manvers Street in Bath.
- Keynsham Civic Centre, purpose-built for the council in 2014 to replace the 1960s Keynsham Town Hall.
- The Hollies in Midsomer Norton, which was the former offices of Norton Radstock Urban District Council and had been substantially extended whilst owned by Wansdyke District Council.

== See also ==
- Healthcare in Somerset
