= Bath City Council elections =

Local government elections in Avon, England

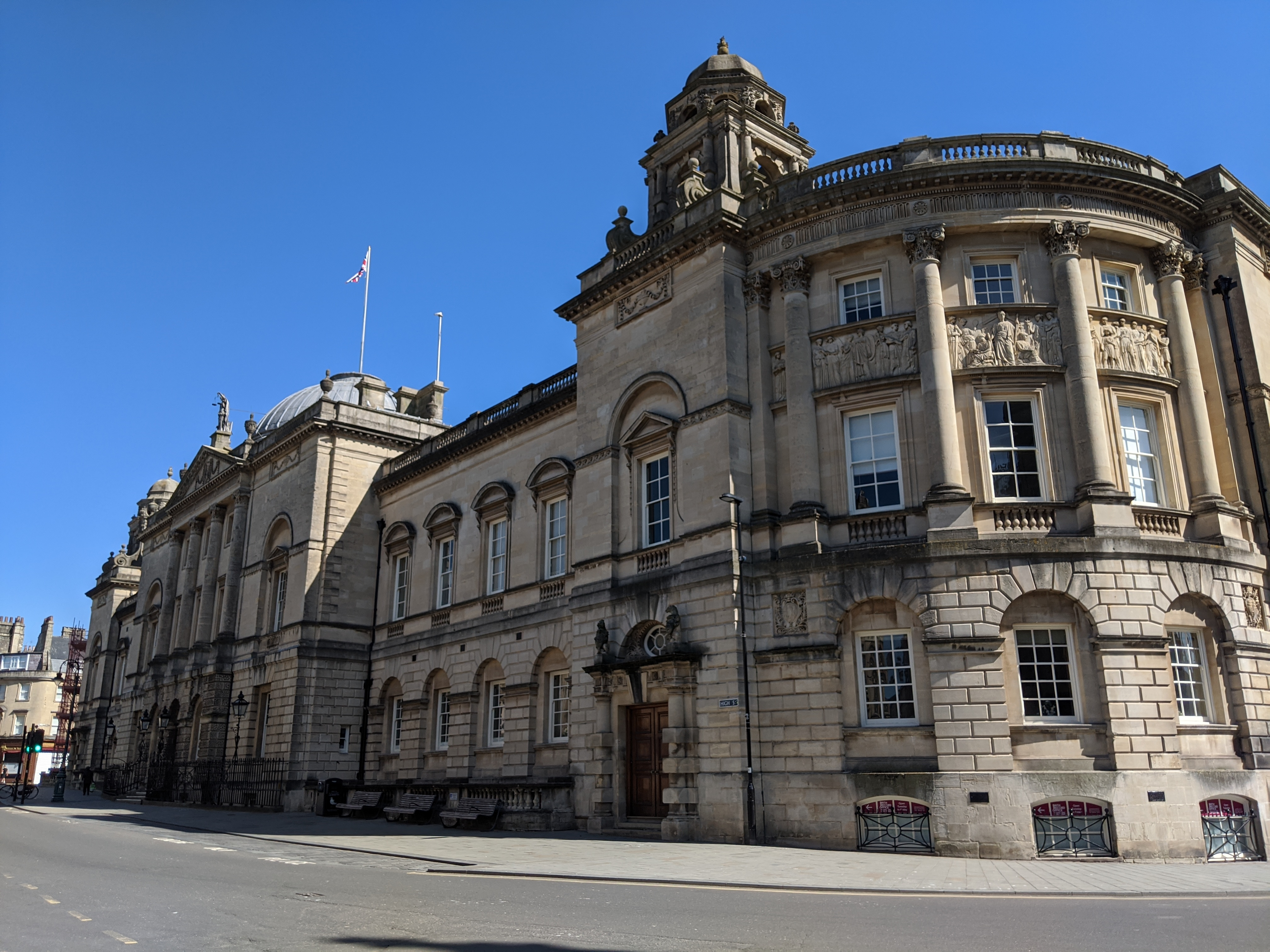
Guidlhall in Bath, the former headquarters of the city council

Bath City Council was a non-metropolitan district in Avon, England, that administered the city of Bath, Somerset, from 1974 until 1996. The district council replaced the pre-1974 county borough council.

Elections were first held on 10 May 1973, with the authority taking effect on 1 April 1974. Following the second election to the district council, the election saw terms of councillors extended from three to four years with subsequent elections for the council taking place in thirds, and the last such election was in 1994. On 1 April 1996, the city council was abolished when it was merged with Wansdyke District Council to form the new unitary authority of Bath and North East Somerset.

== Political control ==
From the first election to the council in 1973 until its abolition in 1996, political control of the council was held by the following parties:

Party in control	Years
No overall control	1973–1976
Conservative	1976–1987
No overall control	1987–1988
Conservative	1988–1990
No overall control	1990–1994
Liberal Democrats	1994–1996

== Council elections ==
- 1973 election
- 1976 election (Note: New ward boundaries)
- 1978 election
- 1979 election
- 1980 election
- 1981 election
- 1983 election
- 1984 election
- 1986 election
- 1987 election
- 1988 election
- 1990 election
- 1991 election
- 1992 election
- 1994 election

== City result maps ==
1976 results map

1978 results map

1979 results map

1980 results map

1982 results map

1983 results map

1984 results map

1986 results map

1987 results map

1988 results map

1990 results map

1991 results map

1992 results map

1994 results map
