= 1992 Bath City Council election =

1992 UK local government election

← 1991	7 May 1992	1994 →

17 of 48 seats (one third plus one vacant seat) to Bath City Council 25 seats needed for a majority
	First party	Second party	Third party
	Con	LD	Lab
Party	Conservative	Liberal Democrats	Labour
Seats before	24	13	11
Seats won	11	5	1
Seats after	24	17	7
Seat change	Steady	▲4	▼4
Popular vote	14,367	12,361	5,941
Percentage	43.5%	37.4%	18.0%
Swing	▲8.3%	▲0.7%	▼6.1%
- Map showing the results of the 1992 Bath City Council elections. Blue showing Conservative, Red showing Labour and Yellow showing Liberal Democrats.
Council control before election
No overall control
Council control after election
No overall control

The 1992 Bath City Council election was held on Thursday 7 May 1992 to elect councillors to Bath City Council in England. It took place on the same day as other district council elections in the United Kingdom. One third of seats were up for election. Two seats were contested in Kingsmead due to an extra vacancy occurring.

== Results summary ==
Bath City Council election, 1992
Party	This election			Full council			This election		
Party	Seats	Net	Seats %	Other	Total	Total %	Votes	Votes %	+/−
Conservative	11	Steady	64.7%	13	24	50%	14,367	43.5%	▲8.3%
Liberal Democrats	5	▲4	29.4%	12	17	35.4%	12,361	37.4%	▲0.7%
Labour	1	▼4	5.9%	6	7	14.6%	5,941	18.0%	▼6.1%
Green	0	Steady	0%	0	0	0%	346	1.0%	▼2.7%
Liberal	0	Steady	0%	0	0	0%	37	0.1%	▼0.1%

== Ward results ==
Sitting councillors seeking re-election, elected in 1988, are marked with an asterisk (*). The ward results listed below are based on the changes from the 1991 elections, not taking into account any party defections or by-elections.

=== Abbey ===
Abbey
Party	Candidate	Votes	%	±%
Conservative	Laurence John Harris Coombs *	855	51.1	+10.3
Liberal Democrats	Margaret Feeny	560	33.5	+13.6
Labour	Gilbert Young	259	15.5	–11.9
Majority		295	17.6	
Turnout			40.7	
Registered electors		4,128		
Conservative hold		Swing		

=== Bathwick ===
Bathwick
Party	Candidate	Votes	%	±%
Conservative	Edward Delany	1,280	58.8	+11.5
Liberal Democrats	Stephen Maurice Hogg	740	34.0	+4.1
Labour	P. Young	156	7.2	–2.3
Majority		540	24.8	
Turnout			45.2	
Registered electors		4,813		
Conservative hold		Swing		

=== Bloomfield ===
Bloomfield
Party	Candidate	Votes	%	±%
Conservative	M. Lodge	900	43.9	–0.1
Labour	S. Lydiard *	762	37.2	–1.3
Liberal Democrats	C. Bray	387	18.9	+1.5
Majority		138	6.7	
Turnout			51.2	
Registered electors		4,011		
Conservative gain from Labour		Swing		

=== Combe Down ===
Combe Down
Party	Candidate	Votes	%	±%
Conservative	Leila Margaret Wishart *	1,241	51.9	+15.2
Liberal Democrats	D. Usher	1,005	42.0	–1.9
Labour	C. James	146	6.1	–10.0
Majority		236	9.9	
Turnout			61.4	
Registered electors		3,900		
Conservative hold		Swing		

=== Kingsmead ===
Kingsmead (2 seats)
Party	Candidate	Votes	%	±%
Conservative	Elizabeth Ann Newnham	874	42.7	–0.3
Conservative	J. Mill *	807	–	
Liberal Democrats	L. Burden	453	22.2	+3.3
Liberal Democrats	D. Smith	387	–	
Labour	D. Hurst	372	18.2	–15.2
Labour	M. McIntosh	367	–	
Green	P. Hardman	346	16.9	+12.2
Turnout			48.7	
Registered electors		3,847		
Conservative hold		Swing		
Conservative gain from Labour		Swing		

=== Lambridge ===
Lambridge
Party	Candidate	Votes	%	±%
Conservative	Anthony John Rhymes *	855	51.7	+15.5
Liberal Democrats	Ramon David Cliffe	618	37.4	+3.9
Labour	I. Roker	180	10.9	–12.8
Majority		237	14.3	
Turnout			55.1	
Registered electors		3,005		
Conservative hold		Swing		

=== Lansdown ===
Lansdown
Party	Candidate	Votes	%	±%
Conservative	Sheila Sheppard	1,244	67.1	+9.6
Liberal Democrats	S. Gazeley	479	25.8	+0.7
Labour	J. Vernon	131	7.1	–5.6
Majority		765	41.3	
Turnout			46.7	
Registered electors		3,947		
Conservative hold		Swing		

=== Lyncombe ===
Lyncombe
Party	Candidate	Votes	%	±%
Conservative	M. Hemmings *	1,297	60.0	+11.4
Liberal Democrats	C. Doberska	534	24.7	+4.9
Labour	D. Grant	294	13.6	–11.3
Liberal	T. Powell	37	1.7	–1.0
Majority		763	35.3	
Turnout			50.9	
Registered electors		4,264		
Conservative hold		Swing		

=== Newbridge ===
Newbridge
Party	Candidate	Votes	%	±%
Conservative	Edwina Harding Bradley *	1,188	49.7	+9.8
Liberal Democrats	David Lossl	1,083	45.3	–5.1
Labour	N. Rosser	120	5.0	–4.7
Majority		105	4.4	
Turnout			56.4	
Registered electors		4,233		
Conservative hold		Swing		

=== Oldfield ===
Oldfield
Party	Candidate	Votes	%	±%
Labour	Pamela Richards *	934	51.5	+2.6
Liberal Democrats	R. Ashworth	476	26.1	–4.7
Conservative	J. Hogan	405	22.3	+6.8
Majority		458	25.4	
Turnout			43.9	
Registered electors		4,135		
Labour hold		Swing		

=== Southdown ===
Southdown
Party	Candidate	Votes	%	±%
Liberal Democrats	Paul Crossley *	1,176	64.9	+4.3
Conservative	D. Bennett	400	22.1	+9.1
Labour	J. Ross	236	13.0	–13.4
Majority		776	42.8	
Turnout			44.0	
Registered electors		4,118		
Liberal Democrats hold		Swing		

=== Twerton ===
Twerton
Party	Candidate	Votes	%	±%
Liberal Democrats	E. Sheppard	935	55.3	+6.0
Labour	L. Harrington *	535	31.7	–10.0
Conservative	H. Pointer	220	13.0	+4.0
Majority		400	23.6	
Turnout			45.4	
Registered electors		3,728		
Liberal Democrats gain from Labour		Swing		

=== Walcot ===
Walcot
Party	Candidate	Votes	%	±%
Conservative	Howard William Routledge *	709	39.5	+2.8
Liberal Democrats	A. Greig	648	36.1	+16.8
Labour	B. Barrett	440	24.5	–10.3
Majority		61	3.4	
Turnout			47.5	
Registered electors		3,789		
Conservative hold		Swing		

=== Westmoreland ===
Westmoreland
Party	Candidate	Votes	%	±%
Liberal Democrats	Nigel Roberts	929	48.1	–5.0
Labour	Leslie Albert William Ridd *	676	35.0	+0.8
Conservative	V. Oliver	325	16.8	+4.1
Majority		253	13.1	
Turnout			47.2	
Registered electors		4,086		
Liberal Democrats gain from Labour		Swing		

=== Weston ===
Weston
Party	Candidate	Votes	%	±%
Liberal Democrats	J. Bennett	1,003	48.2	–7.5
Conservative	E. Hampton	922	44.3	+12.8
Labour	M. Davis	156	7.5	–5.3
Majority		81	3.9	
Turnout			51.2	
Registered electors		4,063		
Liberal Democrats gain from Conservative		Swing		

=== Widcombe ===
Widcombe
Party	Candidate	Votes	%	±%
Liberal Democrats	Peter John Metcalfe	948	48.1	–7.7
Conservative	N. Guy *	845	42.9	+14.9
Labour	J. Luck	177	9.0	–2.5
Majority		103	5.2	
Turnout			48.9	
Registered electors		4,022		
Liberal Democrats gain from Conservative		Swing		
