= 1994 Bath City Council election =

1994 UK local government election

← 1992	5 May 1994

18 of 48 seats (one third plus two vacant seats) to Bath City Council 25 seats needed for a majority
	First party	Second party	Third party
	LD	Con	Lab
Party	Liberal Democrats	Conservative	Labour
Seats before	17	24	7
Seats won	17	1	0
Seats after	29	17	2
Seat change	▲12	▼7	▼5
Popular vote	19,025	10,364	5,006
Percentage	54.3%	29.6%	14.3%
Swing	▲16.9%	▼13.9%	▼3.7%
- Map showing the results of the 1994 Bath City Council elections. Blue showing Conservative and Orange showing Liberal Democrats.
Council control before election
No overall control
Council control after election
Liberal Democrats

The 1994 Bath City Council election was held on Thursday 5 May 1994 to elect councillors to Bath City Council in England. It took place on the same day as other district council elections in the United Kingdom. One third of seats were up for election. Two seats were contested in Lambridge and Lansdown due to extra vacancies occurring.

These were the final elections of the city council, before its abolition on 1 April 1996 when it was merged with Wansdyke District Council to form Bath and North East Somerset Council.

The 1994 election saw the Liberal Democrats take a majority of seats on the Council for the first time, winning 17 of the 18 seats up for election.

== Results summary ==
Bath City Council election, 1994
Party	This election			Full council			This election		
Party	Seats	Net	Seats %	Other	Total	Total %	Votes	Votes %	+/−
Liberal Democrats	17	▲12	94.4	12	29	60.4	19,025	54.3	▲16.9%
Conservative	1	▼7	5.6	16	17	35.4	10,364	29.6	▼13.9%
Labour	0	▼5	0.0	2	2	4.2	5,006	14.3	▼3.7%
Green	0	Steady	0.0	0	0	0.0	630	1.8	▲0.8%
Independent	0	Steady	0.0	0	0	0.0	28	0.1	N/A

== Ward results ==
Sitting councillors seeking re-election, elected in 1990, are marked with an asterisk (*). The ward results listed below are based on the changes from the 1992 elections, not taking into account any party defections or by-elections.

=== Abbey ===
Abbey
Party	Candidate	Votes	%	±%
Liberal Democrats	Margaret Feeny	1,105	57.3	+23.8
Conservative	Jeffrey William Higgins *	590	30.6	–20.5
Labour	Gilbert Young	235	12.2	–3.3
Majority		515	26.7	
Turnout			46.4	
Registered electors		4,169		
Liberal Democrats gain from Conservative		Swing		

=== Bathwick ===
Bathwick
Party	Candidate	Votes	%	±%
Conservative	John Anthony Bailey	1,030	50.6	–8.2
Liberal Democrats	B. Bodle	822	40.4	+6.4
Labour	A. Hatwal	113	5.5	–1.7
Green	M. Deyes	72	3.5	N/A
Majority		208	10.2	
Turnout			45.0	
Registered electors		4,539		
Conservative hold		Swing		

=== Bloomfield ===
Bloomfield
Party	Candidate	Votes	%	±%
Liberal Democrats	Stephen Maurice Hogg	994	43.4	+24.5
Labour	D. Davis *	700	30.5	–6.7
Conservative	A. Dodgson	598	26.1	–17.8
Majority		294	12.8	
Turnout			58.0	
Registered electors		3,951		
Liberal Democrats gain from Labour		Swing		

=== Combe Down ===
Combe Down
Party	Candidate	Votes	%	±%
Liberal Democrats	Jeffrey Stephen Manning *	1,341	59.8	+17.8
Conservative	S. Edwards	731	32.6	–19.3
Labour	S. Richards	129	5.8	–0.3
Green	S. Oswald-Bannister	42	1.9	N/A
Majority		610	27.2	
Turnout			61.3	
Registered electors		3,668		
Liberal Democrats hold		Swing		

=== Kingsmead ===
Kingsmead
Party	Candidate	Votes	%	±%
Liberal Democrats	Andrew Furse	868	51.3	+29.1
Conservative	J. Hogan	584	34.5	–8.2
Labour	C. Foreman	240	14.2	–4.0
Majority		284	16.8	
Turnout			45.3	
Registered electors		3,755		
Liberal Democrats gain from Conservative		Swing		

=== Lambridge ===
Lambridge (2 seats)
Party	Candidate	Votes	%	±%
Liberal Democrats	Ramon David Cliffe	868	48.7	+24.0
Liberal Democrats	Michael James Kelleher	691	–	
Conservative	D. McDaniel *	541	30.4	–21.3
Conservative	D. Snook	470	–	
Labour	I. Roker	217	12.2	–1.4
Green	J. Rust	156	8.8	N/A
Turnout			58.8	
Registered electors		2,836		
Liberal Democrats gain from Conservative		Swing		
Liberal Democrats gain from Conservative		Swing		

=== Lansdown ===
Lansdown (2 seats)
Party	Candidate	Votes	%	±%
Liberal Democrats	Jeff Kenyon	957	44.3	+18.5
Liberal Democrats	Richard Allan	924	–	
Conservative	P. Buckley *	908	42.0	–25.1
Conservative	L. Hayes	842	–	
Labour	M. Parr	165	7.6	+0.5
Green	P. Andrews	132	6.1	N/A
Turnout			53.7	
Registered electors		3,824		
Liberal Democrats gain from Conservative		Swing		
Liberal Democrats gain from Conservative		Swing		

=== Lyncombe ===
Lyncombe
Party	Candidate	Votes	%	±%
Liberal Democrats	Ann Harding	1,250	52.6	+27.9
Conservative	George Henry Hall *	934	39.3	–20.7
Labour	C. Godwin	193	8.1	–5.5
Majority		316	13.3	
Turnout			58.9	
Registered electors		4,039		
Liberal Democrats gain from Conservative		Swing		

=== Newbridge ===
Newbridge
Party	Candidate	Votes	%	±%
Liberal Democrats	Dawn Stollar *	1,349	58.3	+13.0
Conservative	Evelyn Hampton	770	33.3	–16.4
Labour	Neil Rosser	193	8.3	+3.3
Majority		579	25.0	
Turnout			55.4	
Registered electors		4,179		
Liberal Democrats hold		Swing		

=== Oldfield ===
Oldfield
Party	Candidate	Votes	%	±%
Liberal Democrats	Ruth Griffiths	941	48.1	+22.0
Labour	Hilary Fraser *	794	40.6	–10.9
Conservative	H. Pointer	193	9.9	–12.4
Independent	N. Hales	28	1.4	N/A
Majority		147	7.5	
Turnout			50.2	
Registered electors		3,907		
Liberal Democrats gain from Labour		Swing		

=== Southdown ===
Southdown
Party	Candidate	Votes	%	±%
Liberal Democrats	Marian Hammond *	1,342	74.8	+9.9
Labour	H. Lear	299	16.7	+3.7
Conservative	J. Corson	154	8.6	–13.5
Majority		1,043	58.1	
Turnout			43.8	
Registered electors		4,103		
Liberal Democrats hold		Swing		

=== Twerton ===
Twerton
Party	Candidate	Votes	%	±%
Liberal Democrats	Keith Lunt	1,061	67.4	+12.1
Labour	Kathleen Salt *	408	25.9	–5.8
Conservative	V. Oliver	106	6.7	–6.3
Majority		653	41.5	
Turnout			44.7	
Registered electors		3,527		
Liberal Democrats gain from Labour		Swing		

=== Walcot ===
Walcot
Party	Candidate	Votes	%	±%
Liberal Democrats	Eddie Forrester	734	41.4	+5.3
Conservative	Ahmedus Samad Chowdhury	520	29.3	–10.2
Labour	B. Barrett	417	23.5	–1.0
Green	Richard Scrase	101	5.7	N/A
Majority		214	12.1	
Turnout			49.2	
Registered electors		3,605		
Liberal Democrats gain from Labour		Swing		

=== Westmoreland ===
Westmoreland
Party	Candidate	Votes	%	±%
Liberal Democrats	N. Winch	1,164	59.3	+11.2
Labour	Gillian Wendy Pitman	571	29.1	–7.0
Conservative	Susan Gillian Henley Green	229	11.7	–5.1
Majority		593	30.2	
Turnout			49.4	
Registered electors		3,982		
Liberal Democrats gain from Labour		Swing		

=== Weston ===
Weston
Party	Candidate	Votes	%	±%
Liberal Democrats	Marthe Cairns *	1,468	61.9	+13.7
Conservative	A. Charlton-Porter	698	29.4	–14.9
Labour	J. Ross	143	6.0	–1.5
Green	S. Bradley	64	2.7	N/A
Majority		770	32.4	
Turnout			60.0	
Registered electors		3,985		
Liberal Democrats hold		Swing		

=== Widcombe ===
Widcombe
Party	Candidate	Votes	%	±%
Liberal Democrats	Richard Grundy *	1,146	61.5	+13.4
Conservative	M. Adams	466	25.0	–17.9
Labour	J. Campbell	189	10.1	–1.1
Green	S. Hack	63	3.4	N/A
Majority		680	36.5	
Turnout			52.0	
Registered electors		3,587		
Liberal Democrats hold		Swing		
