= 1991 Bath City Council election =

1991 UK local government election

← 1990	2 May 1991	1992 →

17 of 48 seats (one third plus one vacant seat) to Bath City Council 25 seats needed for a majority
	First party	Second party	Third party
	Con	LD	Lab
Party	Conservative	Liberal Democrats	Labour
Seats before	24	13	11
Seats won	9	7	1
Seats after	24	13	11
Seat change	Steady	Steady	Steady
Popular vote	13,069	13,609	8,963
Percentage	35.2%	36.7%	24.1%
Swing	▲3.9%	▲7.6%	▼7.5%
- Map showing the results of the 1991 Bath City Council elections. Blue showing Conservative, Red showing Labour and Yellow showing Liberal Democrats.
Council control before election
No overall control
Council control after election
No overall control

The 1991 Bath City Council election was held on Thursday 2 May 1991 to elect councillors to Bath City Council in England. It took place on the same day as other district council elections in the United Kingdom. One third of seats were up for election. Two seats were contested in Bathwick due to an extra vacancy occurring.

== Results summary ==
Bath City Council election, 1991
Party	This election			Full council			This election		
Party	Seats	Net	Seats %	Other	Total	Total %	Votes	Votes %	+/−
Conservative	9	Steady	52.9%	15	24	50%	13,069	35.2%	▲3.9%
Liberal Democrats	7	Steady	41.2%	6	13	27.1%	13,609	36.7%	▲7.6%
Labour	1	Steady	5.9%	10	11	22.9%	8,963	24.1%	▼7.5%
Green	0	Steady	0%	0	0	0%	1,355	3.7%	▼2.7%
Liberal	0	Steady	0%	0	0	0%	65	0.2%	N/A
Independent	0	Steady	0%	0	0	0%	60	0.2%	Steady

== Ward results ==
Sitting councillors seeking re-election, elected in 1987, are marked with an asterisk (*). The ward results listed below are based on the changes from the 1990 elections, not taking into account any party defections or by-elections.

=== Abbey ===
Abbey
Party	Candidate	Votes	%	±%
Conservative	Elgar Spencer Jenkins *	792	40.8	+1.7
Labour	B. Tonner	532	27.4	–4.2
Liberal Democrats	Margaret Feeny	387	19.9	+5.5
Green	P. Andrews	209	10.8	+0.3
Independent	R. Carder	23	1.2	N/A
Majority		260	13.4	
Turnout			49.8	
Registered electors		3,901		
Conservative hold		Swing		

=== Bathwick ===
Bathwick (2 seats)
Party	Candidate	Votes	%	±%
Conservative	G. O'Donovan *	1,110	47.3	–7.1
Conservative	John Anthony Bailey	1,042	–	
Liberal Democrats	Stephen Maurice Hogg	701	29.9	+15.3
Liberal Democrats	Adrienne Westbrook	562	–	
Green	N. Hall	312	13.3	+1.1
Labour	C. Davis	222	9.5	–6.3
Labour	J. Luck	166	–	
Turnout			48.6	
Registered electors		4,555		
Conservative hold		Swing		
Conservative hold		Swing		

=== Bloomfield ===
Bloomfield
Party	Candidate	Votes	%	±%
Conservative	Eric Jack Trevor Snook *	1,106	44.0	+14.0
Labour	N. Rosser	967	38.5	–10.0
Liberal Democrats	C. Bray	438	17.4	+0.1
Majority		139	5.5	
Turnout			62.5	
Registered electors		4,017		
Conservative hold		Swing		

=== Combe Down ===
Combe Down
Party	Candidate	Votes	%	±%
Liberal Democrats	Roger Alan Symonds	1,117	43.9	–5.0
Conservative	H. Peters	935	36.7	+3.6
Labour	C. James	410	16.1	+2.2
Green	A. May	84	3.3	–0.8
Majority		182	7.2	
Turnout			64.9	
Registered electors		3,920		
Liberal Democrats hold		Swing		

=== Kingsmead ===
Kingsmead
Party	Candidate	Votes	%	±%
Conservative	David Hawkins *	841	43.0	+7.5
Labour	M. McIntosh	653	33.4	–2.7
Liberal Democrats	N. Sutherland	369	18.9	+3.6
Green	L. Cockcroft	92	4.7	–4.0
Majority		188	9.6	
Turnout			53.0	
Registered electors		3,692		
Conservative hold		Swing		

=== Lambridge ===
Lambridge
Party	Candidate	Votes	%	±%
Conservative	H. McDermid *	612	36.2	+1.1
Liberal Democrats	Ramon David Cliffe	565	33.5	+8.6
Labour	I. Roker	400	23.7	–6.4
Green	Jay Risbridger	112	6.6	–0.3
Majority		47	2.7	
Turnout			56.8	
Registered electors		2,972		
Conservative hold		Swing		

=== Lansdown ===
Lansdown
Party	Candidate	Votes	%	±%
Conservative	Anne Maureen McDonagh *	1,262	57.5	+12.1
Liberal Democrats	S. Gazeley	552	25.1	+5.3
Labour	H. Lintell	278	12.7	–8.3
Green	L. Tedman	104	4.7	–3.5
Majority		710	32.4	
Turnout			56.6	
Registered electors		3,877		
Conservative hold		Swing		

=== Lyncombe ===
Lyncombe
Party	Candidate	Votes	%	±%
Conservative	Brian James Hamlen *	1,171	48.6	+4.7
Labour	D. Grant	600	24.9	–1.4
Liberal Democrats	A. O'Flaherty	477	19.8	–2.1
Green	M. Deyes	95	3.9	–3.0
Liberal	T. Powell	65	2.7	N/A
Majority		571	23.7	
Turnout			57.0	
Registered electors		4,222		
Conservative hold		Swing		

=== Newbridge ===
Newbridge
Party	Candidate	Votes	%	±%
Liberal Democrats	S. Sutherland *	1,301	50.4	+7.0
Conservative	Elizabeth Ann Newnham	1,028	39.9	+3.5
Labour	S. Richards	250	9.7	–5.8
Majority		273	10.5	
Turnout			60.8	
Registered electors		4,241		
Liberal Democrats hold		Swing		

=== Oldfield ===
Oldfield
Party	Candidate	Votes	%	±%
Labour	D. Book	1,080	48.9	–1.5
Liberal Democrats	D. Usher	678	30.7	+0.5
Conservative	R. Wilmington	343	15.5	+2.6
Green	M. Davidson	69	3.1	–1.2
Independent	N. Hales	37	1.7	–0.4
Majority		402	18.2	
Turnout			54.9	
Registered electors		4,018		
Labour gain from Liberal Democrats		Swing		

=== Southdown ===
Southdown
Party	Candidate	Votes	%	±%
Liberal Democrats	Angela Godfrey	1,352	60.6	+13.2
Labour	K. Weston	588	26.4	–9.7
Conservative	D. Bennett	290	13.0	–0.5
Majority		764	34.2	
Turnout			54.0	
Registered electors		4,126		
Liberal Democrats hold		Swing		

=== Twerton ===
Twerton
Party	Candidate	Votes	%	±%
Liberal Democrats	Tim Ball	940	49.3	+29.5
Labour	R. Padfield	794	41.7	–24.3
Conservative	H. Pointer	171	9.0	–2.3
Majority		146	7.6	
Turnout			52.2	
Registered electors		3,651		
Liberal Democrats gain from Labour		Swing		

=== Walcot ===
Walcot
Party	Candidate	Votes	%	±%
Conservative	P. Goodhart *	701	36.7	+9.2
Labour	A. Marjoram	665	34.8	–4.7
Liberal Democrats	M. Buhr	369	19.3	+3.1
Green	P. Sherrard-Smith	177	9.3	–3.7
Majority		36	1.9	
Turnout			52.6	
Registered electors		3,633		
Conservative hold		Swing		

=== Westmoreland ===
Westmoreland
Party	Candidate	Votes	%	±%
Liberal Democrats	John Bryant *	1,241	53.1	+20.0
Labour	A. Pye	798	34.2	–14.2
Conservative	A. Taylor	297	12.7	–1.4
Majority		443	19.1	
Turnout			58.9	
Registered electors		3,968		
Liberal Democrats hold		Swing		

=== Weston ===
Weston
Party	Candidate	Votes	%	±%
Liberal Democrats	R. Burden	1,350	55.7	+11.3
Conservative	E. Hampton	762	31.5	–0.9
Labour	S. Cottman	310	12.8	–6.7
Majority		588	24.2	
Turnout			60.3	
Registered electors		4,015		
Liberal Democrats hold		Swing		

=== Widcombe ===
Widcombe
Party	Candidate	Votes	%	±%
Liberal Democrats	Tony Clark *	1,210	55.8	+17.9
Conservative	H. Cross	606	28.0	–5.0
Labour	K. Bray	250	11.5	–5.8
Green	S. Hack	101	4.7	–6.5
Majority		604	27.8	
Turnout			57.0	
Registered electors		3,802		
Liberal Democrats hold		Swing		
