= Margaret Feeny =

Founder and first director of London's Africa Centre

Margaret Feeny MBE
- Born: Margaret Mary Feeny; 1917
- Died: 3 January 2012 (aged 94–95)
- Known for: Founder and first director of the Africa Centre, London

Margaret Mary Feeny MBE (1917 – 3 January 2012) was the founder and first director of London's Africa Centre charity, from 1963 to 1978.

== Biography ==
Margaret Feeny was born in 1917, the eleventh of twelve children of a businessman.

Feeny was General Secretary of the Sword of the Spirit, which became the Catholic Institute for International Relations (CIIR), and then Progressio. She conceptualized the Africa Centre, London, and organised support from both Africans and Britons to bring the idea to fruition. The Africa Centre was registered as a charity in 1961, and in 1964 opened to the public at 38 King Street, Covent Garden, with Feeny as its first director. She remained in that role from 1963 until 1978. In the 1969 Birthday Honours, she was appointed a Member of the Order of the British Empire (MBE).

In 1975, she moved to Bath, Somerset. She was elected as a Liberal Democrat councillor for the Abbey ward of Bath City Council in 1994, defeating the Conservative incumbent. She had previously stood unsuccessfully in the Walcot ward in 1986 and 1987, and in the Abbey ward in 1991 and 1992. After the abolition of Bath City Council and the creation of Bath and North East Somerset Council, Feeny was re-elected to the Abbey ward on the new authority in 1995.

Feeny became Mayor of Bath in 1996, but had a stroke while on official business to their twin town of Aix-en-Provence. She died in early 2012 aged 94 and her funeral took place at St John's Church, South Parade, Bath, on 18 January.
