= 1990 Bath City Council election =

1990 UK local government election

| ← 1988 | 3 May 1990 | 1991 → |

16 of 48 seats (one third) to Bath City Council 25 seats needed for a majority
| | First party | Second party | Third party |
|---|---|---|---|
| | Con | LD | Lab |
| Party | Conservative | Liberal Democrats | Labour |
| Seats before | 26 | 14 | 8 |
| Seats won | 5 | 5 | 6 |
| Seats after | 24 | 13 | 11 |
| Seat change | ▼2 | ▼1 | ▲3 |
| Popular vote | 11,411 | 10,609 | 11,530 |
| Percentage | 31.3% | 29.1% | 31.6% |
| Swing | ▼11.4% | ▲4.6% | ▲5.0% |
- Map showing the results of the 1990 Bath City Council elections. Blue showing Conservative, Red showing Labour and Yellow showing Liberal Democrats.
Council control before election
Conservative
Council control after election
No overall control

The 1990 Bath City Council election was held on Thursday 3 May 1990 to elect councillors to Bath City Council in England. It took place on the same day as other district council elections in the United Kingdom. One-third of seats were up for election.

== Results summary ==
Bath City Council election, 1990
| Party | This election | | | Full council | | | This election | | |
| Party | Seats | Net | Seats % | Other | Total | Total % | Votes | Votes % | +/− |
|---|---|---|---|---|---|---|---|---|---|
| Labour | 6 | ▲3 | 37.5% | 5 | 11 | 22.9% | 11,530 | 31.6% | ▲5% |
| Conservative | 5 | ▼2 | 31.3% | 19 | 24 | 50% | 11,411 | 31.3% | ▼11.4% |
| Liberal Democrats | 5 | ▼1 | 31.3% | 8 | 13 | 27.1% | 10,609 | 29.1% | ▲4.6% |
| Green | 0 | Steady | 0% | 0 | 0 | 0% | 2,316 | 6.4% | ▲0.2% |
| Association of Bath Citizens | 0 | Steady | 0% | 0 | 0 | 0% | 507 | 1.4% | N/A |
| Independent | 0 | Steady | 0% | 0 | 0 | 0% | 88 | 0.2% | N/A |

== Ward results ==
Sitting councillors seeking re-election, elected in 1986, are marked with an asterisk (*). The ward results listed below are based on the changes from the 1988 elections, not taking into account any party defections or by-elections.

=== Abbey ===
Abbey
| Party | Candidate | Votes | % | ±% |
|---|---|---|---|---|
| Conservative | Jeffrey William Higgins * | 741 | 39.1 | –16.0 |
| Labour | B. Tonner | 600 | 31.6 | +8.3 |
| Liberal Democrats | Stephen Maurice Hogg | 273 | 14.4 | +0.6 |
| Green | L. Thompson | 200 | 10.5 | +2.7 |
| Association of Bath Citizens | N. Menneer | 45 | 2.4 | N/A |
| Independent | P. Beeching | 37 | 2.0 | N/A |
| Majority | | 142 | 7.5 | |
| Turnout | | | 46.6 | |
| Registered electors | | 4,083 | | |
| Conservative hold | | Swing | | |

=== Bathwick ===
Bathwick
| Party | Candidate | Votes | % | ±% |
|---|---|---|---|---|
| Conservative | H. Lanning * | 1,245 | 54.4 | –3.5 |
| Labour | J. Luck | 362 | 15.8 | +6.8 |
| Liberal Democrats | Michael Twohig | 333 | 14.6 | +3.1 |
| Green | N. Hall | 280 | 12.2 | –9.3 |
| Association of Bath Citizens | F. Moore | 68 | 3.0 | N/A |
| Majority | | 883 | 38.6 | |
| Turnout | | | 52.4 | |
| Registered electors | | 4,369 | | |
| Conservative hold | | Swing | | |

=== Bloomfield ===
Bloomfield
| Party | Candidate | Votes | % | ±% |
|---|---|---|---|---|
| Labour | D. Davis | 1,193 | 48.5 | +5.0 |
| Conservative | J. Hogan | 737 | 30.0 | –13.4 |
| Liberal Democrats | C. Bray | 425 | 17.3 | +7.4 |
| Green | T. Oswald-Bannister | 103 | 4.2 | +1.0 |
| Majority | | 456 | 18.5 | |
| Turnout | | | 60.5 | |
| Registered electors | | 4,065 | | |
| Labour gain from Conservative | | Swing | | |

=== Combe Down ===
Combe Down
| Party | Candidate | Votes | % | ±% |
|---|---|---|---|---|
| Liberal Democrats | Jeffrey Stephen Manning | 1,315 | 48.9 | +5.8 |
| Conservative | R. Thomas | 889 | 33.1 | –11.5 |
| Labour | N. Rosser | 375 | 13.9 | +4.2 |
| Green | A. May | 110 | 4.1 | +1.5 |
| Majority | | 426 | 15.8 | |
| Turnout | | | 68.3 | |
| Registered electors | | 3,938 | | |
| Liberal Democrats hold | | Swing | | |

=== Kingsmead ===
Kingsmead
| Party | Candidate | Votes | % | ±% |
|---|---|---|---|---|
| Labour | H. Sinclair-Ross | 724 | 36.1 | +8.3 |
| Conservative | Elizabeth Ann Newnham * | 712 | 35.5 | –11.7 |
| Liberal Democrats | F. Bovett | 307 | 15.3 | –1.4 |
| Green | Duncan McCanlis | 175 | 8.7 | +0.3 |
| Association of Bath Citizens | T. Newman | 88 | 4.4 | N/A |
| Majority | | 12 | 0.6 | |
| Turnout | | | 52.0 | |
| Registered electors | | 3,867 | | |
| Labour gain from Conservative | | Swing | | |

=== Lambridge ===
Lambridge
| Party | Candidate | Votes | % | ±% |
|---|---|---|---|---|
| Conservative | D. McDaniel * | 653 | 35.1 | –15.9 |
| Labour | I. Roker | 560 | 30.1 | +10.7 |
| Liberal Democrats | Michael James Kelleher | 463 | 24.9 | +2.9 |
| Green | J. Frecheville | 128 | 6.9 | –0.7 |
| Association of Bath Citizens | V. Reed | 57 | 3.1 | N/A |
| Majority | | 93 | 5.0 | |
| Turnout | | | 61.8 | |
| Registered electors | | 3,023 | | |
| Conservative hold | | Swing | | |

=== Lansdown ===
Lansdown
| Party | Candidate | Votes | % | ±% |
|---|---|---|---|---|
| Conservative | P. Buckley * | 1,047 | 45.4 | –18.0 |
| Labour | C. Davis | 484 | 21.0 | +11.3 |
| Liberal Democrats | S. Gazeley | 457 | 19.8 | +0.8 |
| Green | L. Cockcroft | 190 | 8.2 | +0.3 |
| Association of Bath Citizens | A. Mockler | 128 | 5.6 | N/A |
| Majority | | 563 | 24.4 | |
| Turnout | | | 58.3 | |
| Registered electors | | 3,959 | | |
| Conservative hold | | Swing | | |

=== Lyncombe ===
Lyncombe
| Party | Candidate | Votes | % | ±% |
|---|---|---|---|---|
| Conservative | George Henry Hall * | 1,101 | 43.9 | –11.2 |
| Labour | D. Grant | 660 | 26.3 | +7.9 |
| Liberal Democrats | A. O'Flaherty | 549 | 21.9 | +2.7 |
| Green | T. Morgan | 172 | 6.9 | –0.4 |
| Association of Bath Citizens | G. Wheatcroft | 26 | 1.0 | N/A |
| Majority | | 441 | 17.6 | |
| Turnout | | | 57.8 | |
| Registered electors | | 4,345 | | |
| Conservative hold | | Swing | | |

=== Newbridge ===
Newbridge
| Party | Candidate | Votes | % | ±% |
|---|---|---|---|---|
| Liberal Democrats | Dawn Stollar * | 1,125 | 43.4 | +2.4 |
| Conservative | C. Mundy | 944 | 36.4 | –10.8 |
| Labour | S. Richards | 403 | 15.5 | +7.0 |
| Green | C. Hiron | 122 | 4.7 | +1.4 |
| Majority | | 181 | 7.0 | |
| Turnout | | | 59.1 | |
| Registered electors | | 4,394 | | |
| Liberal Democrats hold | | Swing | | |

=== Oldfield ===
Oldfield
| Party | Candidate | Votes | % | ±% |
|---|---|---|---|---|
| Labour | Hilary Fraser | 1,212 | 50.4 | –2.9 |
| Liberal Democrats | D. Usher | 725 | 30.2 | +7.7 |
| Conservative | E. Hamlen | 311 | 12.9 | –8.1 |
| Green | M. Deyes | 104 | 4.3 | +1.0 |
| Independent | N. Hales | 51 | 2.1 | N/A |
| Majority | | 487 | 20.2 | |
| Turnout | | | 58.7 | |
| Registered electors | | 4,101 | | |
| Labour gain from Liberal Democrats | | Swing | | |

=== Southdown ===
Southdown
| Party | Candidate | Votes | % | ±% |
|---|---|---|---|---|
| Liberal Democrats | Marian Frances Hammond * | 1,166 | 47.4 | +9.7 |
| Labour | S. Weston | 888 | 36.1 | –1.0 |
| Conservative | D. Bennett | 332 | 13.5 | –9.3 |
| Green | S. Pierce | 72 | 2.9 | +0.6 |
| Majority | | 278 | 11.3 | |
| Turnout | | | 58.7 | |
| Registered electors | | 4,190 | | |
| Liberal Democrats hold | | Swing | | |

=== Twerton ===
Twerton
| Party | Candidate | Votes | % | ±% |
|---|---|---|---|---|
| Labour | Kathleen Salt | 1,264 | 66.0 | –5.8 |
| Liberal Democrats | Angela Godfrey | 379 | 19.8 | +11.0 |
| Conservative | H. Pointer | 216 | 11.3 | –6.4 |
| Green | T. Wilcox | 57 | 3.0 | +1.4 |
| Majority | | 885 | 46.2 | |
| Turnout | | | 49.8 | |
| Registered electors | | 3,858 | | |
| Labour hold | | Swing | | |

=== Walcot ===
Walcot
| Party | Candidate | Votes | % | ±% |
|---|---|---|---|---|
| Labour | P. Hardy | 828 | 39.5 | +1.5 |
| Conservative | J. Herod | 577 | 27.5 | –14.1 |
| Liberal Democrats | D. Blesto | 340 | 16.2 | +7.5 |
| Green | Jay Risbridger | 272 | 13.0 | +1.2 |
| Association of Bath Citizens | G. McEwen | 81 | 3.9 | N/A |
| Majority | | 251 | 12.0 | |
| Turnout | | | 55.0 | |
| Registered electors | | 3,819 | | |
| Labour hold | | Swing | | |

=== Westmoreland ===
Westmoreland
| Party | Candidate | Votes | % | ±% |
|---|---|---|---|---|
| Labour | Denis Reginald Lovelace * | 1,078 | 48.4 | –3.5 |
| Liberal Democrats | Tim Ball | 738 | 33.1 | +10.6 |
| Conservative | S. Green | 315 | 14.1 | –7.6 |
| Green | J. Kohler | 97 | 4.4 | +0.5 |
| Majority | | 340 | 15.3 | |
| Turnout | | | 55.0 | |
| Registered electors | | 4,062 | | |
| Labour hold | | Swing | | |

=== Weston ===
Weston
| Party | Candidate | Votes | % | ±% |
|---|---|---|---|---|
| Liberal Democrats | Marthe Cairns | 1,173 | 44.4 | +4.0 |
| Conservative | F. Howarth | 856 | 32.4 | –13.8 |
| Labour | M. Hefferman | 515 | 19.5 | +9.5 |
| Green | A. Marchant | 96 | 3.6 | +0.3 |
| Majority | | 317 | 12.0 | |
| Turnout | | | 63.7 | |
| Registered electors | | 4,147 | | |
| Liberal Democrats hold | | Swing | | |

=== Widcombe ===
Widcombe
| Party | Candidate | Votes | % | ±% |
|---|---|---|---|---|
| Liberal Democrats | Charles Grundy | 841 | 37.9 | –0.5 |
| Conservative | J. Harrison | 734 | 33.0 | –7.8 |
| Labour | N. Swatton | 384 | 17.3 | +1.7 |
| Green | S. Hack | 248 | 11.2 | +5.9 |
| Association of Bath Citizens | A. Hobbs-Burfitt | 14 | 0.6 | N/A |
| Majority | | 107 | 4.9 | |
| Turnout | | | 57.7 | |
| Registered electors | | 3,859 | | |
| Liberal Democrats hold | | Swing | | |
