= 1984 Bath City Council election =

1984 UK local government election

| ← 1983 | 3 May 1984 | 1986 → |

16 of 48 seats (one third) to Bath City Council 25 seats needed for a majority
| | First party | Second party | Third party |
|---|---|---|---|
| | Con | Lab | All |
| Party | Conservative | Labour | Alliance |
| Seats before | 33 | 11 | 4 |
| Seats won | 9 | 5 | 2 |
| Seats after | 31 | 11 | 6 |
| Seat change | ▼2 | Steady | ▲2 |
| Popular vote | 12,145 | 8,686 | 7,769 |
| Percentage | 42.5% | 30.4% | 27.2% |
| Swing | ▼3.1% | ▲3.7% | ▲2.4% |
- Map showing the results of the 1984 Bath City Council elections. Blue showing Conservative, Red showing Labour and Yellow showing SDP–Liberal Alliance.
Council control before election
Conservative
Council control after election
Conservative

The 1984 Bath City Council election was held on Thursday 3 May 1984 to elect councillors to Bath City Council in England. It took place on the same day as other district council elections in the United Kingdom. One third of seats were up for election.

== Results summary ==
Bath City Council election, 1984
| Party | This election | | | Full council | | | This election | | |
| Party | Seats | Net | Seats % | Other | Total | Total % | Votes | Votes % | +/− |
|---|---|---|---|---|---|---|---|---|---|
| Conservative | 9 | ▼2 | 56.3 | 22 | 31 | 64.6 | 12,145 | 42.5 | ▼3.1% |
| Labour | 5 | Steady | 31.3 | 6 | 11 | 22.9 | 8,686 | 30.4 | ▲3.7% |
| Alliance | 2 | ▲2 | 12.5 | 4 | 6 | 12.5 | 7,769 | 27.2 | ▲2.4% |

== Ward results ==
Sitting councillors seeking re-election, elected in 1980, are marked with an asterisk (*). The ward results listed below are based on the changes from the 1983 elections, not taking into account any party defections or by-elections.

=== Abbey ===
Abbey
| Party | Candidate | Votes | % | ±% |
|---|---|---|---|---|
| Conservative | Laurence John Harris Coombs * | 979 | 57.3 | |
| Alliance | Adrian Pegg | 372 | 21.8 | |
| Labour | G. Stevens | 357 | 20.9 | |
| Majority | | 607 | 35.5 | |
| Turnout | | | 37.1 | |
| Registered electors | | 4,599 | | |
| Conservative hold | | Swing | | |

=== Bathwick ===
Bathwick
| Party | Candidate | Votes | % | ±% |
|---|---|---|---|---|
| Conservative | M. Branford | 1,136 | 65.2 | |
| Alliance | Kenneth Drain | 375 | 21.5 | |
| Labour | S. Lydiard | 230 | 13.2 | |
| Majority | | 761 | 43.7 | |
| Turnout | | | 36.7 | |
| Registered electors | | 4,750 | | |
| Conservative hold | | Swing | | |

=== Bloomfield ===
Bloomfield
| Party | Candidate | Votes | % | ±% |
|---|---|---|---|---|
| Labour | Samuel Leslie Jane * | 886 | 47.0 | +17.9 |
| Conservative | A. Dilly | 615 | 32.6 | –11.7 |
| Alliance | A. Stevenson | 383 | 20.3 | –6.3 |
| Majority | | 271 | 14.4 | |
| Turnout | | | 44.9 | |
| Registered electors | | 4,200 | | |
| Labour hold | | Swing | | |

=== Combe Down ===
Combe Down
| Party | Candidate | Votes | % | ±% |
|---|---|---|---|---|
| Conservative | J. Attwood * | 859 | 46.7 | –4.8 |
| Alliance | Jeffrey Stephen Manning | 721 | 39.2 | –5.4 |
| Labour | D. Nicoll | 258 | 14.0 | –0.7 |
| Majority | | 138 | 7.5 | |
| Turnout | | | 44.7 | |
| Registered electors | | 4,110 | | |
| Conservative hold | | Swing | | |

=== Kingsmead ===
Kingsmead
| Party | Candidate | Votes | % | ±% |
|---|---|---|---|---|
| Conservative | J. Mill | 752 | 49.4 | –2.4 |
| Labour | S. King | 419 | 27.5 | +1.1 |
| Alliance | B. Quibell | 350 | 23.0 | +1.1 |
| Majority | | 333 | 21.9 | |
| Turnout | | | 37.4 | |
| Registered electors | | 4,067 | | |
| Conservative hold | | Swing | | |

=== Lambridge ===
Lambridge
| Party | Candidate | Votes | % | ±% |
|---|---|---|---|---|
| Conservative | Anthony John Rhymes * | 876 | 58.9 | |
| Labour | P. Meads | 307 | 20.6 | |
| Alliance | B. Durand | 304 | 20.4 | |
| Majority | | 569 | 38.3 | |
| Turnout | | | 48.1 | |
| Registered electors | | 3,089 | | |
| Conservative hold | | Swing | | |

=== Lansdown ===
Lansdown
| Party | Candidate | Votes | % | ±% |
|---|---|---|---|---|
| Conservative | Ian Charles Dewey | 1,100 | 57.4 | –7.9 |
| Alliance | Margaret Ann Roper | 549 | 28.6 | +5.4 |
| Labour | E. Crawley | 269 | 14.0 | +2.4 |
| Majority | | 551 | 28.8 | |
| Turnout | | | 45.8 | |
| Registered electors | | 4,184 | | |
| Conservative hold | | Swing | | |

=== Lyncombe ===
Lyncombe
| Party | Candidate | Votes | % | ±% |
|---|---|---|---|---|
| Conservative | M. Hemmings | 1,131 | 56.1 | –2.7 |
| Alliance | G. Lambert | 514 | 25.5 | +7.1 |
| Labour | D. Haigh | 372 | 18.4 | +3.6 |
| Majority | | 617 | 30.6 | |
| Turnout | | | 43.4 | |
| Registered electors | | 4,650 | | |
| Conservative hold | | Swing | | |

=== Newbridge ===
Newbridge
| Party | Candidate | Votes | % | ±% |
|---|---|---|---|---|
| Conservative | Edwina Harding Bradley * | 998 | 50.4 | –6.0 |
| Alliance | Dawn Stollar | 557 | 28.1 | +7.8 |
| Labour | J. Miles | 425 | 21.5 | +8.0 |
| Majority | | 441 | 22.3 | |
| Turnout | | | 44.6 | |
| Registered electors | | 4,441 | | |
| Conservative hold | | Swing | | |

=== Oldfield ===
Oldfield
| Party | Candidate | Votes | % | ±% |
|---|---|---|---|---|
| Labour | Pamela Richards * | 933 | 46.3 | +4.3 |
| Alliance | M. Mackintosh | 636 | 31.6 | +3.2 |
| Conservative | M. Wheadon | 445 | 22.1 | –7.5 |
| Majority | | 297 | 14.7 | |
| Turnout | | | 47.3 | |
| Registered electors | | 4,261 | | |
| Labour hold | | Swing | | |

=== Southdown ===
Southdown
| Party | Candidate | Votes | % | ±% |
|---|---|---|---|---|
| Alliance | C. South | 728 | 43.3 | +7.1 |
| Labour | R. Padfield * | 634 | 37.7 | –0.2 |
| Conservative | J. Willis | 318 | 18.9 | –7.1 |
| Majority | | 94 | 5.6 | |
| Turnout | | | 44.1 | |
| Registered electors | | 3,811 | | |
| Alliance gain from Labour | | Swing | | |

=== Twerton ===
Twerton
| Party | Candidate | Votes | % | ±% |
|---|---|---|---|---|
| Labour | L. Harrington * | 1,060 | 69.2 | +5.5 |
| Alliance | M. Le Grice | 237 | 15.5 | –2.6 |
| Conservative | D. Legge | 235 | 15.3 | –2.9 |
| Majority | | 823 | 53.7 | |
| Turnout | | | 37.8 | |
| Registered electors | | 4,053 | | |
| Labour hold | | Swing | | |

=== Walcot ===
Walcot
| Party | Candidate | Votes | % | ±% |
|---|---|---|---|---|
| Labour | J. Linden | 719 | 40.9 | +8.2 |
| Conservative | John Humphrey Lyons * | 658 | 37.4 | –2.7 |
| Alliance | R. Grundy | 383 | 21.8 | –5.5 |
| Majority | | 61 | 3.5 | |
| Turnout | | | 47.5 | |
| Registered electors | | 3,704 | | |
| Labour gain from Conservative | | Swing | | |

=== Westmoreland ===
Westmoreland
| Party | Candidate | Votes | % | ±% |
|---|---|---|---|---|
| Labour | Leslie Albert William Ridd * | 1,045 | 61.4 | +13.4 |
| Conservative | N. Davison | 402 | 23.6 | –10.4 |
| Alliance | John Ozimek | 255 | 15.0 | –3.0 |
| Majority | | 643 | 37.8 | |
| Turnout | | | 42.1 | |
| Registered electors | | 4,040 | | |
| Labour hold | | Swing | | |

=== Weston ===
Weston
| Party | Candidate | Votes | % | ±% |
|---|---|---|---|---|
| Alliance | Colin Luckhurst | 1,011 | 44.4 | –0.6 |
| Conservative | D. Cassell | 833 | 36.6 | –5.0 |
| Labour | T. Hanlon | 434 | 19.1 | +5.8 |
| Majority | | 178 | 7.8 | |
| Turnout | | | 53.7 | |
| Registered electors | | 4,244 | | |
| Alliance hold | | Swing | | |

=== Widcombe ===
Widcombe
| Party | Candidate | Votes | % | ±% |
|---|---|---|---|---|
| Conservative | Jeannette Farley Hole * | 808 | 52.5 | +10.8 |
| Alliance | M. Denoon | 394 | 25.6 | +11.6 |
| Labour | G. West | 338 | 21.9 | +4.3 |
| Majority | | 414 | 26.9 | |
| Turnout | | | 39.0 | |
| Registered electors | | 3,944 | | |
| Conservative hold | | Swing | | |
