= 1982 Bath City Council election =

1982 UK local government election

← 1980	6 May 1982	1983 →

17 of 48 seats (one third plus one vacant seat) to Bath City Council 25 seats needed for a majority
	First party	Second party	Third party
	Con	Lab	All
Party	Conservative	Labour	Alliance
Seats before	33	14	1
Seats won	12	2	3
Seats after	33	11	4
Seat change	Steady	▼3	▲3
Popular vote	13,255	6,318	9,713
Percentage	44.2%	21.1%	32.4%
Swing	▼4.0%	▼14.1%	▲20.1%
- Map showing the results of the 1982 Bath City Council elections. Blue showing Conservative, Red showing Labour and Yellow showing SDP–Liberal Alliance.
Council control before election
Conservative
Council control after election
Conservative

The 1982 Bath City Council election was held on Thursday 6 May 1982 to elect councillors to Bath City Council in England. It took place on the same day as other district council elections in the United Kingdom. One third of seats were up for election. Two seats were contested in Lambridge due to an extra vacancy occurring.

== Results summary ==
Bath City Council election, 1982
Party	This election			Full council			This election		
Party	Seats	Net	Seats %	Other	Total	Total %	Votes	Votes %	+/−
Conservative	12	Steady	70.6	21	33	68.8	13,255	44.2%	▼4%
Alliance	3	▲3	17.6	1	4	8.3	9,713	32.4%	▲20.1%
Labour	2	▼3	11.8	9	11	22.9	6,318	21.1%	▼14.1%
Ecology	0	Steady	0.0	0	0	0.0	438	1.5%	▼2.4%
Independent	0	Steady	0.0	0	0	0.0	207	1.0%	N/A
Independent Alliance	0	Steady	0.0	0	0	0.0	47	0.2%	N/A

== Ward results ==
Sitting councillors seeking re-election, elected in 1978, are marked with an asterisk (*). The ward results listed below are based on the changes from the 1980 elections, not taking into account any party defections or by-elections.

=== Abbey ===
Abbey
Party	Candidate	Votes	%	±%
Conservative	Jeffrey William Higgins *	862	58.0	
Alliance	M. Macdonald	340	22.9	
Labour	S. Hamilton	236	15.9	
Ind. Alliance	P. Elcock	47	3.2	
Majority		522	35.2	
Turnout			36.0	
Registered electors		4,294		
Conservative hold		Swing		

=== Bathwick ===
Bathwick
Party	Candidate	Votes	%	±%
Conservative	H. Lanning	1,259	65.4	
Alliance	D. Tickell	512	26.6	
Labour	R. Cloet	154	8.0	
Majority		747	38.8	
Turnout			41.3	
Registered electors		4,664		
Conservative hold		Swing		

=== Bloomfield ===
Bloomfield
Party	Candidate	Votes	%	±%
Conservative	R. Burdett	788	38.0	
Labour	A. Whitehead *	645	31.1	
Alliance	David Treby	638	30.8	
Majority		143	6.9	
Turnout			49.8	
Registered electors		4,156		
Conservative gain from Labour		Swing		

=== Combe Down ===
Combe Down
Party	Candidate	Votes	%	±%
Conservative	R. Buchanan *	1,021	53.1	
Alliance	G. Mayer	903	46.9	
Majority		118	6.2	
Turnout			46.3	
Registered electors		4,152		
Conservative hold		Swing		

=== Kingsmead ===
Kingsmead
Party	Candidate	Votes	%	±%
Conservative	Elizabeth Ann Newnham *	881	52.0	
Alliance	M. Jones	429	25.3	
Labour	L. Moreton	384	22.7	
Majority		452	26.7	
Turnout			41.5	
Registered electors		4,079		
Conservative hold		Swing		

=== Lambridge ===
Lambridge (2 seats)
Party	Candidate	Votes	%	±%
Conservative	D. McDaniel	758	45.9	
Conservative	H. McDermid	662	–	
Alliance	A. Hanham	509	30.8	
Alliance	A. Kerslake	445	–	
Labour	D. Pearce	383	23.2	
Labour	G. Wood	340	–	
Turnout			55.2	
Registered electors		3,087		
Conservative hold		Swing		
Conservative hold		Swing		

=== Lansdown ===
Lansdown
Party	Candidate	Votes	%	±%
Conservative	P. Buckley *	1,201	60.2	
Alliance	Marian Hammond	614	30.8	
Labour	E. Crawley	180	9.0	
Majority		587	29.4	
Turnout			50.8	
Registered electors		3,930		
Conservative hold		Swing		

=== Lyncombe ===
Lyncombe
Party	Candidate	Votes	%	±%
Conservative	George Henry Hall *	1,142	56.7	
Alliance	P. Davis	575	28.6	
Ecology	J. Brinnand	296	14.7	
Majority		567	28.1	
Turnout			44.2	
Registered electors		4,555		
Conservative hold		Swing		

=== Newbridge ===
Newbridge
Party	Candidate	Votes	%	±%
Conservative	J. Anton *	898	45.0	
Alliance	M. Holmes	692	34.7	
Labour	L. Skipper	229	11.5	
Independent	M. Beechinor	178	8.9	
Majority		206	10.3	
Turnout			47.4	
Registered electors		4,211		
Conservative hold		Swing		

=== Oldfield ===
Oldfield
Party	Candidate	Votes	%	±%
Alliance	Brian Anthony Roper	647	37.2	
Labour	P. Grogan	635	36.6	
Conservative	D. Sykes	455	26.2	
Majority		12	0.6	
Turnout			40.7	
Registered electors		4,271		
Alliance gain from Labour		Swing		

=== Southdown ===
Southdown
Party	Candidate	Votes	%	±%
Alliance	Terry Edwards	631	42.4	
Labour	F. Hobbs *	525	35.3	
Conservative	T. Maginsky	333	22.4	
Majority		106	7.1	
Turnout			41.0	
Registered electors		3,632		
Alliance gain from Labour		Swing		

=== Twerton ===
Twerton
Party	Candidate	Votes	%	±%
Labour	I. Jefferies *	1,004	66.4	
Alliance	B. Potter	284	18.8	
Conservative	J. Popham	225	14.9	
Majority		720	47.6	
Turnout			37.9	
Registered electors		3,995		
Labour hold		Swing		

=== Walcot ===
Walcot
Party	Candidate	Votes	%	±%
Conservative	P. Goodhart	600	37.6	
Alliance	G. Plumbridge	547	34.3	
Labour	S. Sweeney	418	26.2	
Independent	J. Cruttwell	29	1.8	
Majority		53	3.3	
Turnout			41.7	
Registered electors		3,827		
Conservative hold		Swing		

=== Westmoreland ===
Westmoreland
Party	Candidate	Votes	%	±%
Labour	Denis Reginald Lovelace *	865	50.6	
Conservative	B. Redfearn	457	26.7	
Alliance	E. Bennett	387	22.6	
Majority		408	23.9	
Turnout			41.7	
Registered electors		4,102		
Labour hold		Swing		

=== Weston ===
Weston
Party	Candidate	Votes	%	±%
Alliance	Leon Pitt	1,224	55.6	
Conservative	J. Lee	977	44.4	
Majority		247	11.2	
Turnout			52.7	
Registered electors		4,174		
Alliance gain from Conservative		Swing		

=== Widcombe ===
Widcombe
Party	Candidate	Votes	%	±%
Conservative	S. Dunn *	736	48.0	
Alliance	J. Talbot	336	21.9	
Labour	D. Book	320	20.9	
Ecology	R. Carder	142	9.3	
Majority		400	26.1	
Turnout			39.0	
Registered electors		3,935		
Conservative hold		Swing		
