= 1983 Bath City Council election =

1983 UK local government election

← 1982	5 May 1983	1984 →

18 of 48 seats (one third plus two vacant seats) to Bath City Council 25 seats needed for a majority
	First party	Second party	Third party
	Con	Lab	All
Party	Conservative	Labour	Alliance
Seats before	33	11	4
Seats won	12	5	1
Seats after	33	11	4
Seat change	Steady	Steady	Steady
Popular vote	15,563	9,114	8,451
Percentage	45.6%	26.7%	24.8%
Swing	▲1.4%	▲5.6%	▼7.6%
- Map showing the results of the 1983 Bath City Council elections. Blue showing Conservative, Red showing Labour and Yellow showing SDP–Liberal Alliance.
Council control before election
Conservative
Council control after election
Conservative

The 1983 Bath City Council election was held on Thursday 5 May 1983 to elect councillors to Bath City Council in England. It took place on the same day as other district council elections in the United Kingdom. One third of seats were up for election. Two seats were contested in Twerton and Widcombe due to extra vacancies occurring.

== Results summary ==
Bath City Council election, 1983
Party	This election			Full council			This election		
Party	Seats	Net	Seats %	Other	Total	Total %	Votes	Votes %	+/−
Conservative	12	Steady	66.7	21	33	68.8	15,563	45.6	▲1.4%
Labour	5	Steady	27.8	6	11	22.9	9,114	26.7	▲5.6%
Alliance	1	Steady	5.6	3	4	8.3	8,451	24.8	▼7.6%
Independent	0	Steady	0.0	0	0	0.0	596	1.7	▲0.7%
Ecology	0	Steady	0.0	0	0	0.0	419	1.2	▼0.3%

== Ward results ==
Sitting councillors seeking re-election, elected in 1979, are marked with an asterisk (*). The ward results listed below are based on the changes from the 1982 elections, not taking into account any party defections or by-elections.

=== Abbey ===
Abbey
Party	Candidate	Votes	%	±%
Conservative	Elgar Spencer Jenkins *	1,021	58.8	
Labour	S. Phillips	298	17.2	
Alliance	C. Hussey	298	17.2	
Ecology	T. Oswald-Bannister	67	3.9	
Independent	P. Elcock	52	3.0	
Majority		723	41.6	
Turnout			40.4	
Registered electors		4,294		
Conservative hold		Swing		

=== Bathwick ===
Bathwick
Party	Candidate	Votes	%	±%
Conservative	G. O'Donovan *	1,338	67.7	
Alliance	G. Abbott	414	21.0	
Labour	P. Mosley	223	11.3	
Majority		924	46.7	
Turnout			42.0	
Registered electors		4,703		
Conservative hold		Swing		

=== Bloomfield ===
Bloomfield
Party	Candidate	Votes	%	±%
Conservative	Eric Jack Trevor Snook *	977	44.3	
Labour	J. Dowling	641	29.1	
Alliance	J. McNeilage	585	26.6	
Majority		336	15.2	
Turnout			52.6	
Registered electors		4,186		
Conservative hold		Swing		

=== Combe Down ===
Combe Down
Party	Candidate	Votes	%	±%
Conservative	Leila Margaret Wishart	1,077	51.5	
Alliance	G. Mayer	708	33.8	
Labour	P. Meads	307	14.7	
Majority		369	17.7	
Turnout			50.0	
Registered electors		4,181		
Conservative hold		Swing		

=== Kingsmead ===
Kingsmead
Party	Candidate	Votes	%	±%
Conservative	R. Atkinson *	842	51.8	
Labour	M. Macrae	429	26.4	
Alliance	A. Pearce	356	21.9	
Majority		413	25.4	
Turnout			40.8	
Registered electors		3,990		
Conservative hold		Swing		

=== Lambridge ===
Lambridge
Party	Candidate	Votes	%	±%
Conservative	H. McDermid *	795	46.6	
Alliance	A. Kerslake	597	26.4	
Labour	A. Hannam	314	18.4	
Majority		198	11.6	
Turnout			55.1	
Registered electors		3,099		
Conservative hold		Swing		

=== Lansdown ===
Lansdown
Party	Candidate	Votes	%	±%
Conservative	Anne Maureen McDonagh *	1,367	65.3	
Alliance	Margaret Ann Roper	486	23.2	
Labour	E. Crawley	242	11.6	
Majority		881	42.1	
Turnout			52.8	
Registered electors		3,971		
Conservative hold		Swing		

=== Lyncombe ===
Lyncombe
Party	Candidate	Votes	%	±%
Conservative	Brian James Hamlen *	1,337	58.8	
Alliance	G. Lambert	418	18.4	
Labour	D. Haigh	337	14.8	
Ecology	Don Grimes	180	7.9	
Majority		919	40.4	
Turnout			50.2	
Registered electors		4,524		
Conservative hold		Swing		

=== Newbridge ===
Newbridge
Party	Candidate	Votes	%	±%
Conservative	C. Mundy	1,139	56.4	
Alliance	B. Durand	409	20.3	
Labour	J. Miles	273	13.5	
Independent	M. Beechinor	198	9.8	
Majority		730	36.1	
Turnout			47.2	
Registered electors		4,281		
Conservative hold		Swing		

=== Oldfield ===
Oldfield
Party	Candidate	Votes	%	±%
Labour	D. Pearce	917	42.0	
Conservative	M. Wheadon	646	29.6	
Alliance	Marian Hammond	619	28.4	
Majority		271	12.4	
Turnout			51.3	
Registered electors		4,256		
Labour hold		Swing		

=== Southdown ===
Southdown
Party	Candidate	Votes	%	±%
Labour	S. Weston *	647	37.9	
Alliance	C. South	618	36.2	
Conservative	D. Sykes	444	26.0	
Majority		29	1.7	
Turnout			46.7	
Registered electors		3,660		
Labour hold		Swing		

=== Twerton ===
Twerton (2 seats)
Party	Candidate	Votes	%	±%
Labour	Alec Louis Ricketts *	1,075	63.7	
Labour	L. Harrington	965	–	
Conservative	J. Popham	308	18.2	
Alliance	B. Potter	305	18.1	
Conservative	J. Mill	268	–	
Alliance	J. Marigold	196	–	
Turnout			42.3	
Registered electors		3,995		
Labour hold		Swing		
Labour hold		Swing		

=== Walcot ===
Walcot
Party	Candidate	Votes	%	±%
Conservative	Howard William Routledge *	711	40.1	
Labour	J. Linden	580	32.7	
Alliance	G. Plumbridge	484	27.3	
Majority		131	7.4	
Turnout			47.6	
Registered electors		3,732		
Conservative hold		Swing		

=== Westmoreland ===
Westmoreland
Party	Candidate	Votes	%	±%
Labour	D. Book	912	48.0	
Conservative	A. Buchanan	646	34.0	
Alliance	E. Bennett	341	18.0	
Majority		266	14.0	
Turnout			46.7	
Registered electors		4,070		
Labour hold		Swing		

=== Weston ===
Weston
Party	Candidate	Votes	%	±%
Alliance	John James Malloy *	1,127	45.0	
Conservative	T. Broadwith	1,041	41.6	
Labour	T. Murphy	334	13.3	
Majority		86	3.4	
Turnout			59.3	
Registered electors		4,220		
Alliance hold		Swing		

=== Widcombe ===
Widcombe (2 seats)
Party	Candidate	Votes	%	±%
Conservative	H. Cross *	812	41.7	
Conservative	C. Patterson	794	–	
Independent	D. Collyer	346	17.8	
Labour	G. Evans	342	17.6	
Labour	G. West	278	–	
Alliance	A. Bennett	273	14.0	
Alliance	John Ozimek	217	–	
Ecology	R. Carder	172	8.8	
Turnout			49.6	
Registered electors		3,924		
Conservative hold		Swing		
Conservative hold		Swing		
