= 1973 Bath City Council election =

1973 UK local government election

10 May 1973	1976 →

All 45 seats to Bath City Council 23 seats needed for a majority
	First party	Second party	Third party
	Con	Lab	Lib
Party	Conservative	Labour	Liberal
Seats won	19	17	9
Popular vote	15,777	16,961	16,882
Percentage	31.1%	33.5%	33.3%
Council control after election
No overall control

The 1973 Bath City Council election was held on Thursday 10 May 1973 to elect councillors to the new Bath City Council in England. It took place on the same day as other district council elections in the United Kingdom.

These were the first elections to the new district council, which would come into effect on 1 April 1974. Future elections would take place every three years, with the next election scheduled for 6 May 1976.

The 1973 election saw no party take overall control of the council, with the Conservatives being the largest party.

== Election results ==
Bath City Council election, 1973
Party	Candidates						Votes		
Party	Stood	Elected	Gained	Unseated	Net	% of total	%	No.	Net %
Conservative	29	19	–	–	–	42.2%	31.1%	15,777	N/A
Labour	24	17	–	–	–	37.8%	33.5%	16,901	N/A
Liberal	24	9	–	–	–	20%	33.3%	16,882	N/A
Residents	3	0	–	–	–	0%	2.1%	1,053	N/A

== Ward results ==
=== Abbey ===
Abbey (3 seats)
Party	Candidate	Votes	%	±%
Conservative	Laurence John Harris Coombs	618	48.7	N/A
Conservative	Elgar Spencer Jenkins	551	–	
Conservative	Jeffrey William Higgins	499	–	
Residents	W. Evans	411	32.4	N/A
Residents	S. Farr	397	–	
Residents	H. Bland	245	–	
Liberal	M. Wall	240	18.9	N/A
Liberal	Adrian Pegg	229	–	
Liberal	A. Bailey	190	–	
Turnout			44.4	N/A
Registered electors		2,857		
Conservative win (new seat)				
Conservative win (new seat)				
Conservative win (new seat)				

=== Bathwick ===
Bathwick (3 seats)
Party	Candidate	Votes	%	±%
Conservative	P. Gees	unopposed	N/A	N/A
Conservative	Kenneth John Holloway	unopposed	N/A	N/A
Conservative	Mary Elizabeth Rawlings	unopposed	N/A	N/A
Registered electors		3,944		
Conservative win (new seat)				
Conservative win (new seat)				
Conservative win (new seat)				

=== Bloomfield ===
Bloomfield (3 seats)
Party	Candidate	Votes	%	±%
Labour	Samuel Leslie Jane	846	59.4	N/A
Labour	G. Yates	692	–	
Labour	T. Challis	658	–	
Conservative	J. Jones	579	40.6	N/A
Conservative	P. Dillon	568	–	
Conservative	A. Dilley	536	–	
Turnout			39.6	N/A
Registered electors		3,602		
Labour win (new seat)				
Labour win (new seat)				
Labour win (new seat)				

=== Combe Down ===
Combe Down (3 seats)
Party	Candidate	Votes	%	±%
Conservative	Ian Charles Dewey	910	52.0	N/A
Conservative	W. Podger	882	–	
Conservative	J. Attwood	876	–	
Liberal	R. Wardle	840	48.0	N/A
Liberal	G. Pyle	757	–	
Liberal	W. Brown	732	–	
Turnout			47.1	N/A
Registered electors		3,713		
Conservative win (new seat)				
Conservative win (new seat)				
Conservative win (new seat)				

=== Kingsmead ===
Kingsmead (3 seats)
Party	Candidate	Votes	%	±%
Labour	M. Pepper	937	51.8	N/A
Conservative	George Durant Kersley	873	48.2	N/A
Labour	Hilary Fraser	816	–	
Labour	J. Halpin	737	–	
Conservative	P. Lunn	702	–	
Conservative	F. Beresford-Smith	653	–	
Turnout			43.1	N/A
Registered electors		4,197		
Labour win (new seat)				
Conservative win (new seat)				
Labour win (new seat)				

=== Lambridge ===
Lambridge (3 seats)
Party	Candidate	Votes	%	±%
Conservative	Anthony John Rhymes	1,104	45.1	N/A
Conservative	H. Underhay	873	–	
Liberal	G. Mower	760	31.0	N/A
Liberal	A. Hanham	618	–	
Labour	R. Cambourne	586	23.9	N/A
Conservative	W. Logan	560	–	
Labour	P. Cave	505	–	
Labour	R. Eades	504	–	
Liberal	G. Whiteley	467	–	
Turnout			57.8	N/A
Registered electors		4,242		
Conservative win (new seat)				
Conservative win (new seat)				
Liberal win (new seat)				

=== Lansdown ===
Lansdown (3 seats)
Party	Candidate	Votes	%	±%
Liberal	Walter Gower Huggett	1,480	60.9	N/A
Liberal	Marianna Clark	1,451	–	
Liberal	H. Brake	1,200	–	
Conservative	R. Smith	949	39.1	N/A
Turnout			46.6	N/A
Registered electors		5,208		
Liberal win (new seat)				
Liberal win (new seat)				
Liberal win (new seat)				

=== Lyncombe ===
Lyncombe (3 seats)
Party	Candidate	Votes	%	±%
Conservative	Brian James Hamlen	unopposed	N/A	N/A
Conservative	Thomas John Cornish	unopposed	N/A	N/A
Conservative	H. Crallan	unopposed	N/A	N/A
Registered electors		4,911		
Conservative win (new seat)				
Conservative win (new seat)				
Conservative win (new seat)				

=== Newbridge ===
Newbridge (3 seats)
Party	Candidate	Votes	%	±%
Liberal	Peter Downey	1,054	56.9	N/A
Liberal	L. Corner	891	–	
Liberal	D. Lincoln	815	–	
Conservative	G. Hughes	799	43.1	N/A
Conservative	J. Hale	748	–	
Turnout			44.7	N/A
Registered electors		4,143		
Liberal win (new seat)				
Liberal win (new seat)				
Liberal win (new seat)				

=== Oldfield ===
Oldfield (3 seats)
Party	Candidate	Votes	%	±%
Labour	L. Ashman	982	64.3	N/A
Labour	Roy Gordon Hiscocks	972	–	
Labour	F. Gilbert	934	–	
Liberal	R. Brake	545	35.7	N/A
Turnout			38.9	N/A
Registered electors		3,928		
Labour win (new seat)				
Labour win (new seat)				
Labour win (new seat)				

=== Twerton East ===
Twerton East (3 seats)
Party	Candidate	Votes	%	±%
Labour	William Percy Johns	1,091	66.0	N/A
Labour	F. Hobbs	918	–	
Labour	Leslie Albert William Ridd	913	–	
Liberal	H. Nash	563	34.0	N/A
Turnout			35.5	N/A
Registered electors		4,657		
Labour win (new seat)				
Labour win (new seat)				
Labour win (new seat)				

=== Twerton West ===
Twerton West (3 seats)
Party	Candidate	Votes	%	±%
Labour	Alec Louis Ricketts	1,022	61.9	N/A
Labour	E. Hobbs	1,018	–	
Labour	J. Lyons	1,012	–	
Liberal	B. Potter	628	38.1	N/A
Liberal	G. Lambert	563	–	
Liberal	R. Ferris	545	–	
Turnout			30.0	N/A
Registered electors		5,504		
Labour win (new seat)				
Labour win (new seat)				
Labour win (new seat)				

=== Walcot ===
Walcot (3 seats)
Party	Candidate	Votes	%	±%
Conservative	John Humphrey Lyons	966	38.6	N/A
Liberal	G. Plumbridge	893	35.6	N/A
Conservative	M. Cheek	822	–	
Liberal	J. Ruff	803	–	
Conservative	L. Hughes	709	–	
Labour	M. Baber	646	25.8	N/A
Liberal	B. Hill	618	–	
Labour	R. Vince	594	–	
Labour	D. Holley	578	–	
Turnout			48.2	N/A
Registered electors		5,197		
Conservative win (new seat)				
Conservative win (new seat)				
Conservative win (new seat)				

=== Westmoreland ===
Westmoreland (3 seats)
Party	Candidate	Votes	%	±%
Labour	Raymond Charles Rosewarn	unopposed	N/A	N/A
Labour	R. Padfield	unopposed	N/A	N/A
Labour	T. Street	unopposed	N/A	N/A
Registered electors		3,641		
Labour win (new seat)				
Labour win (new seat)				
Labour win (new seat)				

=== Widcombe ===
Widcombe (3 seats)
Party	Candidate	Votes	%	±%
Liberal	Cicely Margaret Edmunds	unopposed	N/A	N/A
Conservative	Jeannette Farley Hole	unopposed	N/A	N/A
Conservative	D. Elliott	unopposed	N/A	N/A
Registered electors		3,367		
Liberal win (new seat)				
Conservative win (new seat)				
Conservative win (new seat)				
