= 1987 Bath City Council election =

1987 UK local government election

← 1986	7 May 1987	1988 →

17 of 48 seats (one third plus one vacant seat) to Bath City Council 25 seats needed for a majority
	First party	Second party	Third party
	Con	All	Lab
Party	Conservative	Alliance	Labour
Seats before	26	10	12
Seats won	9	7	1
Seats after	24	16	8
Seat change	▼2	▲6	▼4
Popular vote	15,053	13,993	7,885
Percentage	40.0%	37.2%	21.0%
Swing	▲4.0%	▲0.9%	▼6.7%
- Map showing the results of the 1987 Bath City Council elections. Blue showing Conservative, Red showing Labour and Yellow showing SDP–Liberal Alliance.
Council control before election
Conservative
Council control after election
No overall control

The 1987 Bath City Council election was held on Thursday 7 May 1987 to elect councillors to Bath City Council in England. It took place on the same day as other district council elections in the United Kingdom. One third of seats were up for election. Two seats were contested in Walcot due to an extra vacancy occurring.

== Results summary ==
Bath City Council election, 1987
Party	This election			Full council			This election		
Party	Seats	Net	Seats %	Other	Total	Total %	Votes	Votes %	+/−
Conservative	9	▼2	52.9%	15	24	50%	15,053	40.0%	▲4%
Alliance	7	▲6	41.2%	9	16	33.3%	13,993	37.2%	▲0.9%
Labour	1	▼4	5.9%	7	8	16.7%	7,885	21.0%	▼6.7%

== Ward results ==
Sitting councillors seeking re-election, elected in 1983, are marked with an asterisk (*). The ward results listed below are based on the changes from the 1986 elections, not taking into account any party defections or by-elections.

=== Abbey ===
Abbey
Party	Candidate	Votes	%	±%
Conservative	Elgar Spencer Jenkins *	1,036	50.3	+4.4
Alliance	Adrian Pegg	606	29.4	–2.1
Labour	G. Stevens	330	16.0	–6.6
Green	K. Bateup	86	4.2	N/A
Majority		430	20.9	
Turnout			46.2	
Registered electors		4,458		
Conservative hold		Swing		

=== Bathwick ===
Bathwick
Party	Candidate	Votes	%	±%
Conservative	G. O'Donovan *	1,309	60.9	+0.5
Alliance	Kenneth Drain	545	25.3	–2.8
Labour	H. Hornblower	202	9.4	–2.2
Green	J. Goodyer	95	4.4	N/A
Majority		764	35.5	
Turnout			46.2	
Registered electors		4,651		
Conservative hold		Swing		

=== Bloomfield ===
Bloomfield
Party	Candidate	Votes	%	±%
Conservative	Eric Jack Trevor Snook *	1,097	46.7	+6.7
Labour	S. Lydiard	779	33.2	–3.3
Alliance	M. Le Grice	471	20.1	–3.4
Majority		318	13.5	
Turnout			57.3	
Registered electors		4,097		
Conservative hold		Swing		

=== Combe Down ===
Combe Down
Party	Candidate	Votes	%	±%
Alliance	Jane Tyler	1,286	50.4	+3.0
Conservative	Leila Margaret Wishart *	1,057	41.5	+5.0
Labour	D. Davis	207	8.1	–8.0
Majority		229	9.0	
Turnout			62.7	
Registered electors		4,067		
Alliance gain from Conservative		Swing		

=== Kingsmead ===
Kingsmead
Party	Candidate	Votes	%	±%
Conservative	David Hawkins	858	45.5	+0.2
Alliance	F. Bovett	664	35.2	+6.7
Labour	P. Hardy	365	19.3	–6.7
Majority		194	10.3	
Turnout			45.8	
Registered electors		4,118		
Conservative hold		Swing		

=== Lambridge ===
Lambridge
Party	Candidate	Votes	%	±%
Conservative	H. McDermid *	770	40.2	–0.5
Alliance	Paul Crossley	652	34.1	+5.2
Labour	N. Carter	453	23.7	–6.7
Green	C. Turner	39	2.0	N/A
Majority		118	6.2	
Turnout			62.5	
Registered electors		3,061		
Conservative hold		Swing		

=== Lansdown ===
Lansdown
Party	Candidate	Votes	%	±%
Conservative	Anne Maureen McDonagh *	1,383	59.0	+8.2
Alliance	P. Buckingham	682	29.1	–3.5
Labour	E. Crawley	200	8.5	–8.2
Green	M. Gordon	81	3.5	N/A
Majority		701	29.9	
Turnout			58.2	
Registered electors		4,032		
Conservative hold		Swing		

=== Lyncombe ===
Lyncombe
Party	Candidate	Votes	%	±%
Conservative	Brian James Hamlen *	1,296	49.5	+2.3
Alliance	S. Ible	1,020	39.0	–1.1
Labour	D. Robinson	232	8.9	–3.7
Green	L. Jopling	70	2.7	N/A
Majority		276	10.5	
Turnout			59.9	
Registered electors		4,372		
Conservative hold		Swing		

=== Newbridge ===
Newbridge
Party	Candidate	Votes	%	±%
Alliance	S. Sutherland	1,312	49.5	+7.3
Conservative	D. Book	1,150	43.4	+1.9
Labour	C. Whitmarsh	188	7.1	–9.2
Majority		162	6.1	
Turnout			60.0	
Registered electors		4,418		
Alliance gain from Conservative		Swing		

=== Oldfield ===
Oldfield
Party	Candidate	Votes	%	±%
Alliance	D. Gregory	1,059	43.4	–7.3
Labour	D. Pearce *	924	37.8	+1.1
Conservative	R. Hall	459	18.8	+6.1
Majority		135	5.5	
Turnout			57.5	
Registered electors		4,154		
Alliance gain from Labour		Swing		

=== Southdown ===
Southdown
Party	Candidate	Votes	%	±%
Alliance	A. Bovett	1,078	50.3	+3.8
Labour	S. Weston *	631	29.4	–9.7
Conservative	M. Sykes	436	20.3	+5.9
Majority		447	20.8	
Turnout			53.2	
Registered electors		4,033		
Alliance gain from Labour		Swing		

=== Twerton ===
Twerton
Party	Candidate	Votes	%	±%
Labour	Alec Louis Ricketts *	1,013	61.2	–4.1
Alliance	Michael Twohig	312	18.9	–1.4
Conservative	J. Cameron	302	18.2	+3.7
Green	B. Searle	28	1.7	N/A
Majority		701	42.4	
Turnout			41.8	
Registered electors		3,969		
Labour hold		Swing		

=== Walcot ===
Walcot (2 seats)
Party	Candidate	Votes	%	±%
Conservative	P. Goodhart	847	36.2	+2.4
Conservative	Howard William Routledge *	792	–	
Labour	S. King	659	28.1	–13.8
Alliance	Margaret Feeny	657	28.1	+3.7
Labour	D. Nicoll	594	–	
Alliance	A. Stevenson	492	–	
Green	Derek Wall	179	7.6	N/A
Turnout			61.6	
Registered electors		3,805		
Conservative hold		Swing		
Conservative gain from Labour		Swing		

=== Westmoreland ===
Westmoreland
Party	Candidate	Votes	%	±%
Alliance	John Bryant	732	38.8	+11.4
Labour	D. Book *	709	37.5	–16.6
Conservative	D. Ashdown	448	23.7	+5.2
Majority		23	1.2	
Turnout			48.3	
Registered electors		3,915		
Alliance gain from Labour		Swing		

=== Weston ===
Weston
Party	Candidate	Votes	%	±%
Alliance	John James Malloy *	1,414	56.5	+6.3
Conservative	P. Blair	906	36.2	+0.6
Labour	W. Chivers	144	5.8	–8.4
Green	L. Barnes	39	1.6	N/A
Majority		508	20.3	
Turnout			60.1	
Registered electors		4,168		
Alliance hold		Swing		

=== Widcombe ===
Widcombe
Party	Candidate	Votes	%	±%
Alliance	Tony Clark	1,011	45.7	+1.3
Conservative	H. Cross *	907	41.0	+6.1
Labour	I. Roker	255	11.5	–9.3
Green	P. Hardman	40	1.8	N/A
Majority		104	4.7	
Turnout			57.2	
Registered electors		3,870		
Alliance gain from Conservative		Swing		
