= 1986 Bath City Council election =

1986 UK local government election

← 1984	8 May 1986	1987 →

16 of 48 seats (one third) to Bath City Council 25 seats needed for a majority
	First party	Second party	Third party
	Con	Lab	All
Party	Conservative	Labour	Alliance
Seats before	31	11	6
Seats won	7	3	6
Seats after	26	12	10
Seat change	▼5	▲1	▲4
Popular vote	11,429	8,771	11,508
Percentage	36.0%	27.7%	36.3%
Swing	▼6.5%	▼2.7%	▲9.1%
- Map showing the results of the 1986 Bath City Council elections. Blue showing Conservative, Red showing Labour and Yellow showing SDP–Liberal Alliance.
Council control before election
Conservative
Council control after election
Conservative

The 1986 Bath City Council election was held on Thursday 8 May 1986 to elect councillors to Bath City Council in England. It took place on the same day as other district council elections in the United Kingdom. One third of seats were up for election.

== Results summary ==
Bath City Council election, 1986
Party	This election			Full council			This election		
Party	Seats	Net	Seats %	Other	Total	Total %	Votes	Votes %	+/−
Conservative	7	▼5	43.8	19	26	54.2	11,429	36.0	▼6.5%
Alliance	6	▲4	37.5	4	10	20.8	11,508	36.3	▲9.1%
Labour	3	▲1	18.8	9	12	25	8,771	27.7	▼2.7%

== Ward results ==
Sitting councillors seeking re-election, elected in 1982, are marked with an asterisk (*). The ward results listed below are based on the changes from the 1984 elections, not taking into account any party defections or by-elections.

=== Abbey ===
Abbey
Party	Candidate	Votes	%	±%
Conservative	Jeffrey William Higgins *	819	45.9	–11.4
Alliance	Adrian Pegg	562	31.5	+9.7
Labour	G. Stevens	403	22.6	+1.7
Majority		257	14.4	
Turnout			41.1	
Registered electors		4,340		
Conservative hold		Swing		

=== Bathwick ===
Bathwick
Party	Candidate	Votes	%	±%
Conservative	H. Lanning *	1,145	60.4	–4.8
Alliance	Peter Winston Gordon Duguid	532	28.1	+6.6
Labour	F. Burdett	219	11.6	–1.6
Majority		613	32.3	
Turnout			41.8	
Registered electors		4,532		
Conservative hold		Swing		

=== Bloomfield ===
Bloomfield
Party	Candidate	Votes	%	±%
Conservative	R. Burdett *	812	40.0	+7.4
Labour	S. Lydiard	741	36.5	–10.5
Alliance	R. Grundy	476	23.5	+3.2
Majority		71	3.5	
Turnout			48.9	
Registered electors		4,153		
Conservative hold		Swing		

=== Combe Down ===
Combe Down
Party	Candidate	Votes	%	±%
Alliance	A. Meacock	1,031	47.4	+8.2
Conservative	David Hawkins	793	36.5	–10.2
Labour	D. Nicoll	349	16.1	+2.1
Majority		238	10.9	
Turnout			53.8	
Registered electors		4,038		
Alliance gain from Conservative		Swing		

=== Kingsmead ===
Kingsmead
Party	Candidate	Votes	%	±%
Conservative	Elizabeth Ann Newnham *	750	45.3	–4.1
Alliance	Kenneth Drain	476	28.7	+5.7
Labour	S. King	430	26.0	–1.5
Majority		274	16.6	
Turnout			39.8	
Registered electors		4,166		
Conservative hold		Swing		

=== Lambridge ===
Lambridge
Party	Candidate	Votes	%	±%
Conservative	D. McDaniel *	732	40.7	–18.2
Labour	A. Marjoram	547	30.4	+9.8
Alliance	Paul Crossley	521	28.9	+8.5
Majority		185	10.3	
Turnout			57.9	
Registered electors		3,109		
Conservative hold		Swing		

=== Lansdown ===
Lansdown
Party	Candidate	Votes	%	±%
Conservative	P. Buckley *	1,098	50.8	–6.6
Alliance	P. Buckingham	704	32.6	+4.0
Labour	H. Lintell	360	16.7	+2.7
Majority		394	18.2	
Turnout			52.1	
Registered electors		4,149		
Conservative hold		Swing		

=== Lyncombe ===
Lyncombe
Party	Candidate	Votes	%	±%
Conservative	George Henry Hall *	1,058	47.2	–8.9
Alliance	C. Matthews	899	40.1	+14.6
Labour	N. Carter	283	12.6	–5.8
Majority		159	7.1	
Turnout			49.5	
Registered electors		4,524		
Conservative hold		Swing		

=== Newbridge ===
Newbridge
Party	Candidate	Votes	%	±%
Alliance	Dawn Stollar	991	42.2	+14.1
Conservative	J. Skeet	974	41.5	–8.9
Labour	J. Miles	382	16.3	–5.2
Majority		17	0.7	
Turnout			53.5	
Registered electors		4,386		
Alliance gain from Conservative		Swing		

=== Oldfield ===
Oldfield
Party	Candidate	Votes	%	±%
Alliance	Brian Anthony Roper *	1,171	50.7	+19.1
Labour	B. Wotley	847	36.7	–9.6
Conservative	D. Gunstone	293	12.7	–9.4
Majority		324	14.0	
Turnout			55.5	
Registered electors		4,167		
Alliance hold		Swing		

=== Southdown ===
Southdown
Party	Candidate	Votes	%	±%
Alliance	Marian Frances Hammond	899	46.5	+3.2
Labour	R. Padfield	755	39.1	+1.4
Conservative	M. Sykes	278	14.4	–4.5
Majority		144	7.4	
Turnout			48.5	
Registered electors		3,986		
Alliance hold		Swing		

=== Twerton ===
Twerton
Party	Candidate	Votes	%	±%
Labour	M. Baber	957	65.3	–3.9
Alliance	E. Bennett	297	20.3	+4.8
Conservative	A. Wilson	212	14.5	–0.8
Majority		660	45.0	
Turnout			36.8	
Registered electors		3,980		
Labour hold		Swing		

=== Walcot ===
Walcot
Party	Candidate	Votes	%	±%
Labour	J. Borl	825	41.9	+1.0
Conservative	P. Goodhart *	666	33.8	–3.6
Alliance	Margaret Feeny	480	24.4	+2.6
Majority		159	8.1	
Turnout			54.0	
Registered electors		3,648		
Labour gain from Conservative		Swing		

=== Westmoreland ===
Westmoreland
Party	Candidate	Votes	%	±%
Labour	Denis Reginald Lovelace *	956	54.1	–7.3
Alliance	John Bryant	484	27.4	+12.4
Conservative	A. Buchanan	327	18.5	–5.1
Majority		472	26.7	
Turnout			44.8	
Registered electors		3,943		
Labour hold		Swing		

=== Weston ===
Weston
Party	Candidate	Votes	%	±%
Alliance	Leon Pitt *	1,150	50.2	+5.8
Conservative	P. Blair	816	35.6	–1.0
Labour	A. Watts	326	14.2	–4.9
Majority		334	14.6	
Turnout			55.0	
Registered electors		4,166		
Alliance hold		Swing		

=== Widcombe ===
Widcombe
Party	Candidate	Votes	%	±%
Alliance	J. Talbot	835	44.4	+18.8
Conservative	C. Sellick	656	34.9	–17.6
Labour	J. Chalmers	391	20.8	–1.1
Majority		179	9.5	
Turnout			48.4	
Registered electors		3,887		
Alliance gain from Conservative		Swing		
