= 1979 Bath City Council election =

1979 UK local government election

← 1978	3 May 1979	1980 →

16 of 48 seats (one third) to Bath City Council 25 seats needed for a majority
	First party	Second party	Third party
	Con	Lab	Lib
Party	Conservative	Labour	Liberal
Seats before	34	14	0
Seats won	11	4	1
Seats after	33	14	1
Seat change	▼1	Steady	▲1
Popular vote	22,693	15,085	8,019
Percentage	46.7%	31.0%	16.5%
Swing	▼3.7%	▼1.8%	▲2.9%
- Map showing the results of the 1979 Bath City Council elections. Blue showing Conservative, Red showing Labour and Yellow showing Liberal.
Council control before election
Conservative
Council control after election
Conservative

The 1979 Bath City Council election was held on Thursday 3 May 1979 to elect councillors to Bath City Council in England. It took place on the same day as the general election and other district council elections in the United Kingdom. One third of seats were up for election.

== Results summary ==
Bath City Council election, 1979
Party	This election			Full council			This election		
Party	Seats	Net	Seats %	Other	Total	Total %	Votes	Votes %	+/−
Conservative	11	▼1	68.8%	22	33	68.8%	22,693	46.7	▼3.7%
Labour	4	Steady	25%	10	14	29.2%	15,085	31.0	▼1.8%
Liberal	1	▲1	6.3%	0	1	2.1%	8,019	16.5	▲2.9%
Ecology	0	Steady	0%	0	0	0%	1,674	3.4	▲1.3%
Independent	0	Steady	0%	0	0	0%	1,138	2.3	▲1.3%

== Ward results ==
Sitting councillors seeking re-election, elected in 1976, are marked with an asterisk (*). The ward results listed below are based on the changes from the 1978 elections, not taking into account any party defections or by-elections.

=== Abbey ===
Abbey
Party	Candidate	Votes	%	±%
Conservative	Elgar Spencer Jenkins *	1,507	57.0	
Independent	R. Oswick	761	28.8	
Independent	L. Pitt	377	14.3	
Majority		746	28.2	
Turnout			68.4	
Registered electors		3,867		
Conservative hold		Swing		

=== Bathwick ===
Bathwick
Party	Candidate	Votes	%	±%
Conservative	G. O'Donovan	2,032	57.9	
Liberal	P. Nancarrow	978	27.9	
Labour	M. Scotford	499	14.2	
Majority		1,054	30.0	
Turnout			69.9	
Registered electors		5,020		
Conservative hold		Swing		

=== Bloomfield ===
Bloomfield
Party	Candidate	Votes	%	±%
Conservative	Eric Jack Trevor Snook *	1,726	52.4	
Labour	N. Martin	1,565	47.6	
Majority		161	4.8	
Turnout			79.6	
Registered electors		4,137		
Conservative hold		Swing		

=== Combe Down ===
Combe Down
Party	Candidate	Votes	%	±%
Conservative	Ian Charles Dewey *	1,647	50.9	
Liberal	Rob Greig	807	24.9	
Labour	P. Grogan	782	24.2	
Majority		840	26.0	
Turnout			78.4	
Registered electors		4,126		
Conservative hold		Swing		

=== Kingsmead ===
Kingsmead
Party	Candidate	Votes	%	±%
Conservative	R. Atkinson *	1,409	49.5	
Labour	A. Day	685	24.1	
Liberal	Adrian Pegg	510	17.9	
Ecology	D. Taylor	240	8.4	
Majority		724	25.4	
Turnout			71.3	
Registered electors		3,989		
Conservative hold		Swing		

=== Lambridge ===
Lambridge
Party	Candidate	Votes	%	±%
Conservative	H. Underhay *	1,235	52.0	
Labour	N. Whiskin	662	27.9	
Liberal	N. Davies	477	20.1	
Majority		573	24.1	
Turnout			78.2	
Registered electors		3,036		
Conservative hold		Swing		

=== Lansdown ===
Lansdown
Party	Candidate	Votes	%	±%
Conservative	Anne Maureen McDonagh *	1,764	57.2	
Liberal	Kenneth Drain	826	26.8	
Labour	D. Holley	492	16.0	
Majority		938	30.4	
Turnout			81.8	
Registered electors		3,769		
Conservative hold		Swing		

=== Lyncombe ===
Lyncombe
Party	Candidate	Votes	%	±%
Conservative	Brian James Hamlen *	2,072	59.6	
Ecology	Don Grimes	848	24.4	
Labour	B. Lock	559	16.1	
Majority		1,224	35.2	
Turnout			76.8	
Registered electors		4,532		
Conservative hold		Swing		

=== Newbridge ===
Newbridge
Party	Candidate	Votes	%	±%
Conservative	Robin Nicholas Lane Agg-Manning *	1,625	53.0	
Liberal	M. McCartney	953	31.1	
Labour	Pamela Richards	487	15.9	
Majority		672	21.9	
Turnout			76.3	
Registered electors		4,019		
Conservative hold		Swing		

=== Oldfield ===
Oldfield
Party	Candidate	Votes	%	±%
Labour	Roy Gordon Hiscocks *	2,163	67.0	
Conservative	M. Price	1,065	33.0	
Majority		1,098	34.0	
Turnout			76.0	
Registered electors		4,247		
Labour hold		Swing		

=== Southdown ===
Southdown
Party	Candidate	Votes	%	±%
Labour	William Percy Johns *	1,297	49.5	
Conservative	P. Price	732	27.9	
Liberal	G. Lambert	590	22.5	
Majority		565	21.6	
Turnout			77.6	
Registered electors		3,375		
Labour hold		Swing		

=== Twerton ===
Twerton
Party	Candidate	Votes	%	±%
Labour	Alec Louis Ricketts *	1,718	58.2	
Conservative	T. Simpson	639	21.6	
Liberal	B. Potter	596	20.2	
Majority		1,079	36.6	
Turnout			73.1	
Registered electors		3,972		
Labour hold		Swing		

=== Walcot ===
Walcot
Party	Candidate	Votes	%	±%
Conservative	Howard William Routledge	1,144	41.5	
Liberal	R. Wardle	830	30.1	
Labour	S. Sweeney	781	28.3	
Majority		314	11.4	
Turnout			69.6	
Registered electors		3,956		
Conservative hold		Swing		

=== Westmoreland ===
Westmoreland
Party	Candidate	Votes	%	±%
Labour	M. Baber *	2,046	63.3	
Conservative	H. Peters	1,186	36.7	
Majority		860	26.6	
Turnout			78.8	
Registered electors		4,099		
Labour hold		Swing		

=== Weston ===
Weston
Party	Candidate	Votes	%	±%
Liberal	John James Malloy	1,452	42.7	
Conservative	George Henry Hall *	1,391	40.9	
Labour	S. Paine	560	16.5	
Majority		61	1.8	
Turnout			81.4	
Registered electors		4,180		
Liberal gain from Conservative		Swing		

=== Widcombe ===
Widcombe
Party	Candidate	Votes	%	±%
Conservative	H. Cross *	1,519	52.5	
Labour	I. Morgan	789	27.3	
Ecology	R. Carder	586	20.2	
Majority		730	25.2	
Turnout			74.1	
Registered electors		3,907		
Conservative hold		Swing		
