= 1978 Bath City Council election =

1978 UK local government election

← 1976	4 May 1978	1979 →

16 of 48 seats (one third) to Bath City Council 25 seats needed for a majority
	First party	Second party
	Con	Lab
Party	Conservative	Labour
Seats before	35	13
Seats won	11	5
Seats after	34	14
Seat change	▼1	▲1
Popular vote	12,963	8,435
Percentage	50.4%	32.8%
Swing	▼5.0%	▲2.3%
- Map showing the results of the 1978 Bath City Council elections. Blue showing Conservative and Red showing Labour.
Council control before election
Conservative
Council control after election
Conservative

The 1978 Bath City Council election was held on Thursday 4 May 1978 to elect councillors to Bath City Council in England. It took place on the same day as other district council elections in the United Kingdom. One third of seats were up for election.

== Results summary ==
Bath City Council election, 1978
Party	This election			Full council			This election		
Party	Seats	Net	Seats %	Other	Total	Total %	Votes	Votes %	+/−
Conservative	11	▼1	68.8	13	34	70.8	12,963	50.4	▼5%
Labour	5	▲1	31.3	9	14	29.2	8,435	32.8	▲2.3%
Liberal	0	Steady	0.0	0	0	0.0	3,496	13.6	▲0.3%
Ecology	0	Steady	0.0	0	0	0.0	552	2.1	N/A
Independent	0	Steady	0.0	0	0	0.0	259	1.0	▲0.2%

== Ward results ==
Sitting councillors seeking re-election, elected in 1976, are marked with an asterisk (*). The ward results listed below are based on the changes from the 1976 elections, not taking into account any party defections or by-elections.

=== Abbey ===
Abbey
Party	Candidate	Votes	%	±%
Conservative	Jeffrey William Higgins *	856	64.5	–10.2
Labour	M. Rose	355	26.7	+1.4
Liberal	A. Fox	117	8.8	N/A
Majority		500	37.8	N/A
Turnout			34.2	–5.2
Registered electors		3,884		
Conservative hold		Swing		

=== Bathwick ===
Bathwick
Party	Candidate	Votes	%	±%
Conservative	P. Gees *	1,112	71.9	–12.4
Liberal	P. Nancarrow	222	14.4	N/A
Labour	B. Carlin	212	13.7	–2.0
Majority		1,810	57.5	N/A
Turnout			40.7	–10.4
Registered electors		3,803		
Conservative hold		Swing		

=== Bloomfield ===
Bloomfield
Party	Candidate	Votes	%	±%
Labour	A. Whitehead	812	51.9	–0.6
Conservative	J. Jones	752	48.1	+0.6
Majority		60	3.8	N/A
Turnout			37.7	–13.5
Registered electors		4,145		
Labour gain from Conservative		Swing		

=== Combe Down ===
Combe Down
Party	Candidate	Votes	%	±%
Conservative	R. Buchanan	1,135	65.2	–6.5
Labour	C. Dore	498	28.6	+0.3
Liberal	Kenneth Drain	107	6.1	N/A
Majority		637	36.6	N/A
Turnout			42.0	–8.1
Registered electors		4,138		
Conservative hold		Swing		

=== Kingsmead ===
Kingsmead
Party	Candidate	Votes	%	±%
Conservative	Elizabeth Ann Newnham	1,011	58.3	+0.3
Labour	Hilary Fraser	723	41.7	–0.3
Majority		288	16.6	N/A
Turnout			45.1	–5.3
Registered electors		3,845		
Conservative hold		Swing		

=== Lambridge ===
Lambridge
Party	Candidate	Votes	%	±%
Conservative	G. Mower *	821	52.7	–1.3
Liberal	A. Hanham	427	27.4	+3.6
Labour	N. Whiskin	309	19.8	–2.5
Majority		394	25.3	N/A
Turnout			51.7	–7.1
Registered electors		3,012		
Conservative hold		Swing		

=== Lansdown ===
Lansdown
Party	Candidate	Votes	%	±%
Conservative	P. Buckley *	1,012	59.1	+9.2
Liberal	R. Wardle	485	28.3	–10.7
Labour	B. Lock	216	12.6	+1.5
Majority		527	30.8	N/A
Turnout			46.3	–13.2
Registered electors		3,702		
Conservative hold		Swing		

=== Lyncombe ===
Lyncombe
Party	Candidate	Votes	%	±%
Conservative	J. Dawson *	1,139	59.1	–21.2
Labour	J. Hornblower	380	20.7	+1.0
Ecology	Don Grimes	313	17.7	N/A
Majority		759	41.4	N/A
Turnout			42.1	–5.4
Registered electors		4,354		
Conservative hold		Swing		

=== Newbridge ===
Newbridge
Party	Candidate	Votes	%	±%
Conservative	J. Anton	1,018	69.7	+27.7
Labour	S. Paine	225	15.4	+6.2
Liberal	Adrian Pegg	218	14.9	–12.7
Majority		793	54.3	N/A
Turnout			37.1	–16.9
Registered electors		3,938		
Conservative hold		Swing		

=== Oldfield ===
Oldfield
Party	Candidate	Votes	%	±%
Labour	G. Whitty	879	46.0	–19.4
Conservative	M. Beckett	483	25.3	–9.3
Liberal	E. Andrews	290	15.2	N/A
Independent	F. Gilbert *	259	13.6	N/A
Majority		396	20.7	N/A
Turnout			44.6	+0.5
Registered electors		4,284		
Labour hold		Swing		

=== Southdown ===
Southdown
Party	Candidate	Votes	%	±%
Labour	F. Hobbs *	694	54.6	N/A
Conservative	M. Maidment	430	33.8	N/A
Liberal	B. Potter	148	11.6	N/A
Majority		264	20.8	N/A
Turnout			38.0	N/A
Registered electors		3,351		
Labour hold		Swing		

=== Twerton ===
Twerton
Party	Candidate	Votes	%	±%
Labour	I. Jefferies	1,001	64.9	–5.4
Conservative	M. Price	359	23.3	N/A
Liberal	C. Ferris	182	11.8	–17.9
Majority		642	41.6	N/A
Turnout			39.7	–7.1
Registered electors		3,886		
Labour hold		Swing		

=== Walcot ===
Walcot
Party	Candidate	Votes	%	±%
Conservative	G. Organ *	618	44.0	–4.5
Liberal	G. Plumbridge	407	29.0	–3.5
Labour	S. Sweeney	379	27.0	+8.0
Majority		211	15.0	N/A
Turnout			36.7	–6.1
Registered electors		3,830		
Conservative hold		Swing		

=== Westmoreland ===
Westmoreland
Party	Candidate	Votes	%	±%
Labour	Denis Reginald Lovelace *	1,085	62.5	+2.0
Conservative	G. O'Donovan	453	26.1	–13.4
Liberal	H. Nash	199	11.5	N/A
Majority		632	36.4	N/A
Turnout			42.8	+0.4
Registered electors		4,056		
Labour hold		Swing		

=== Weston ===
Weston
Party	Candidate	Votes	%	±%
Conservative	C. Stebbings *	919	49.0	+6.7
Liberal	John James Malloy	694	37.0	+1.5
Labour	L. Harrington	264	14.1	–8.1
Majority		225	12.0	N/A
Turnout			45.7	–9.9
Registered electors		4,111		
Conservative hold		Swing		

=== Widcombe ===
Widcombe
Party	Candidate	Votes	%	±%
Conservative	D. Elliott *	835	56.5	–13.2
Labour	P. Shelton	403	27.3	–3.0
Ecology	R. Carder	239	16.2	N/A
Majority		432	29.2	N/A
Turnout			37.2	–7.2
Registered electors		3,968		
Conservative hold		Swing		
