= 1988 Bath City Council election =

1988 UK local government election

← 1987	5 May 1988	1990 →

16 of 48 seats (one third) to Bath City Council 25 seats needed for a majority
	First party	Second party	Third party
	Con	SLD	Lab
Party	Conservative	SLD	Labour
Seats before	24	16	8
Seats won	11	1	4
Seats after	26	14	8
Seat change	▲2	▼2	Steady
Popular vote	13,741	7,882	8,546
Percentage	42.7%	24.5%	26.6%
Swing	▲2.7%	▼12.7%	▲5.6%
- Map showing the results of the 1988 Bath City Council elections. Blue showing Conservative, Red showing Labour and Yellow showing Social and Liberal Democrats.
Council control before election
No overall control
Council control after election
Conservative

The 1988 Bath City Council election was held on Thursday 5 May 1988 to elect councillors to Bath City Council in England. It took place on the same day as other district council elections in the United Kingdom. One third of seats were up for election.

== Results summary ==
Bath City Council election, 1988
Party	This election			Full council			This election		
Party	Seats	Net	Seats %	Other	Total	Total %	Votes	Votes %	+/−
Conservative	11	▲2	68.8	15	26	54.2	13,741	42.7	▲2.7
Labour	4	Steady	25	4	8	16.7	8,546	26.6	▲5.6
SLD	1	▼2	6.3	13	14	29.2	7,882	24.1	▼12.7
Green	0	Steady	0	0	0	0.0	2,003	6.2	▲4.5

== Ward results ==
Sitting councillors seeking re-election, elected in 1984, are marked with an asterisk (*). The ward results listed below are based on the changes from the 1987 elections, not taking into account any party defections or by-elections.

=== Abbey ===
Abbey
Party	Candidate	Votes	%	±%
Conservative	Laurence John Harris Coombs *	998	55.1	+4.8
Labour	P. Ward	422	23.3	+7.3
SLD	M. Finch	250	13.8	–15.6
Green	A. Egmore	142	7.8	+3.6
Majority		576	31.8	
Turnout			42.2	
Registered electors		4,297		
Conservative hold		Swing		

=== Bathwick ===
Bathwick
Party	Candidate	Votes	%	±%
Conservative	M. Branford *	1,187	57.9	–3.0
Green	G. Withers	441	21.5	+17.1
SLD	S. Gazeley	236	11.5	–13.8
Labour	W. Tonner	185	9.0	–0.4
Majority		746	36.4	
Turnout			45.1	
Registered electors		4,542		
Conservative hold		Swing		

=== Bloomfield ===
Bloomfield
Party	Candidate	Votes	%	±%
Labour	S. Lydiard	900	43.5	+10.3
Conservative	J. Hogan	899	43.4	–3.3
Liberal Democrats	N. Sutherland	204	9.9	–10.2
Green	T. Oswald-Bannister	67	3.2	N/A
Majority		1	0.1	
Turnout			50.5	
Registered electors		4,095		
Labour hold		Swing		

=== Combe Down ===
Combe Down
Party	Candidate	Votes	%	±%
Conservative	Leila Margaret Wishart	1,068	44.6	+3.1
SLD	Jeffrey Stephen Manning	1,032	43.1	–7.3
Labour	D. Nicoll	232	9.7	+1.6
Green	T. Young	140	8.4	N/A
Majority		36	1.5	
Turnout			60.3	
Registered electors		3,973		
Conservative hold		Swing		

=== Kingsmead ===
Kingsmead
Party	Candidate	Votes	%	±%
Conservative	J. Mill *	790	47.2	+1.7
Labour	P. Hardy	465	27.8	+8.5
SLD	Kenneth Drain	280	16.7	–18.5
Green	P. Hardman	140	8.4	N/A
Majority		325	19.4	
Turnout			41.0	
Registered electors		4,086		
Conservative hold		Swing		

=== Lambridge ===
Lambridge
Party	Candidate	Votes	%	±%
Conservative	Anthony John Rhymes *	850	51.0	+10.8
SLD	Ramon David Cliffe	367	22.0	–12.1
Labour	W. Chivers	323	19.4	–4.3
Green	E. Sparrow	126	7.6	+5.6
Majority		483	29.0	
Turnout			55.4	
Registered electors		3,007		
Conservative hold		Swing		

=== Lansdown ===
Lansdown
Party	Candidate	Votes	%	±%
Conservative	P. Blair	1,240	63.4	+4.4
SLD	M. Le Grice	371	19.0	–10.1
Labour	D. Davis	190	9.7	+1.2
Green	C. French	155	7.9	+4.4
Majority		869	44.4	
Turnout			48.7	
Registered electors		4,018		
Conservative hold		Swing		

=== Lyncombe ===
Lyncombe
Party	Candidate	Votes	%	±%
Conservative	M. Hemmings *	1,229	55.1	+5.6
SLD	M. Mackintosh	427	19.2	–19.8
Labour	A. Whitehead	411	18.4	+9.5
Green	M. Deyes	162	7.3	+4.6
Majority		802	36.0	
Turnout			51.5	
Registered electors		4,345		
Conservative hold		Swing		

=== Newbridge ===
Newbridge
Party	Candidate	Votes	%	±%
Conservative	Edwina Harding Bradley *	1,149	47.2	+3.8
SLD	Ruth Malloy	999	41.0	–8.5
Labour	C. Whitmarsh	207	8.5	+1.4
Green	Duncan McCanlis	81	3.3	N/A
Majority		150	6.2	
Turnout			55.4	
Registered electors		4,395		
Conservative hold		Swing		

=== Oldfield ===
Oldfield
Party	Candidate	Votes	%	±%
Labour	Pamela Richards *	1,142	53.3	+15.5
SLD	S. Ible	482	22.5	–20.9
Conservative	D. Hucklesby	449	21.0	+2.2
Green	N. Hall	70	3.3	N/A
Majority		660	30.8	
Turnout			51.9	
Registered electors		4,129		
Labour hold		Swing		

=== Southdown ===
Southdown
Party	Candidate	Votes	%	±%
SLD	Paul Crossley	724	37.7	–12.6
Labour	S. Weston	712	37.1	+7.7
Conservative	M. Sykes	438	22.8	+2.5
Green	K. Bateup	44	2.3	N/A
Majority		12	0.6	
Turnout			46.3	
Registered electors		4,147		
SLD hold		Swing		

=== Twerton ===
Twerton
Party	Candidate	Votes	%	±%
Labour	L. Harrington *	1,072	71.8	+10.6
Conservative	J. Cameron	264	17.7	–0.5
SLD	G. Scaggs	132	8.8	–10.1
Green	L. Jopling	24	1.6	–0.1
Majority		808	54.1	
Turnout			37.8	
Registered electors		3,947		
Labour hold		Swing		

=== Walcot ===
Walcot
Party	Candidate	Votes	%	±%
Conservative	Howard William Routledge *	793	41.6	+5.4
Labour	Hilary Fraser	723	38.0	+9.9
Green	Derek Wall	224	11.8	+4.2
SLD	Michael James Kelleher	165	8.7	–19.4
Majority		70	3.6	
Turnout			49.5	
Registered electors		3,848		
Conservative hold		Swing		

=== Westmoreland ===
Westmoreland
Party	Candidate	Votes	%	±%
Labour	Leslie Albert William Ridd *	922	51.9	+14.4
SLD	Michael Twohig	431	22.5	–16.3
Conservative	M. Lodge	416	21.7	–2.0
Green	A. Baker	74	3.9	N/A
Majority		561	29.4	
Turnout			57.4	
Registered electors		4,050		
Labour hold		Swing		

=== Weston ===
Weston
Party	Candidate	Votes	%	±%
Conservative	M. Sparrow	1,111	46.2	+10.0
SLD	Colin Luckhurst *	972	40.4	–16.1
Labour	S. Cottman	241	10.0	+4.2
Green	A. Marchant	79	3.3	+1.7
Majority		139	5.8	
Turnout			57.4	
Registered electors		4,185		
Conservative gain from SLD		Swing		

=== Widcombe ===
Widcombe
Party	Candidate	Votes	%	±%
Conservative	N. Guy *	860	40.8	–0.2
SLD	Charles Grundy	810	38.4	–7.3
Labour	W. Chalmers	329	15.6	+4.1
Green	C. Harrison	111	5.3	+3.5
Majority		50	2.4	
Turnout			54.2	
Registered electors		3,896		
Conservative hold		Swing		
