= 1980 Bath City Council election =

1980 UK local government election

← 1979	1 May 1980	1982 →

18 of 48 seats (one third plus two vacant seats) to Bath City Council 25 seats needed for a majority
	First party	Second party	Third party
	Con	Lab	Lib
Party	Conservative	Labour	Liberal
Seats before	33	14	1
Seats won	13	5	0
Seats after	33	14	1
Seat change	Steady	Steady	Steady
Popular vote	14,372	10,490	3,678
Percentage	48.2%	35.2%	12.3%
Swing	▲1.9%	▲4.2%	▼4.2%
- Map showing the results of the 1980 Bath City Council elections. Blue showing Conservative and Red showing Labour.
Council control before election
Conservative
Council control after election
Conservative

The 1980 Bath City Council election was held on Thursday 1 May 1980 to elect councillors to Bath City Council in England. It took place on the same day as other district council elections in the United Kingdom. One third of seats were up for election. Two seats were contested in Lyncombe and Widcombe due to extra vacancies occurring.

== Results summary ==
Bath City Council election, 1980
Party	This election			Full council			This election		
Party	Seats	Net	Seats %	Other	Total	Total %	Votes	Votes %	+/−
Conservative	13	Steady	72.2	20	33	68.8	14,372	48.2	▲1.5%
Labour	5	Steady	27.8	9	14	29.2	10,490	35.2	▲4.2%
Liberal	0	Steady	0.0	1	1	2.1	3,678	12.3	▼4.2%
Ecology	0	Steady	0.0	0	0	0.0	1,173	3.9	▲0.5%
World Government	0	Steady	0.0	0	0	0.0	102	0.3	N/A

== Ward results ==
Sitting councillors seeking re-election, elected in 1976, are marked with an asterisk (*). The ward results listed below are based on the changes from the 1979 elections, not taking into account any party defections or by-elections.

=== Abbey ===
Abbey
Party	Candidate	Votes	%	±%
Conservative	Laurence John Harris Coombs *	1,009	65.2	
Labour	A. Spiller	437	28.2	
World Government	Gilbert Young	102	6.6	
Majority		572	37.0	
Turnout			38.4	
Registered electors		4,033		
Conservative hold		Swing		

=== Bathwick ===
Bathwick
Party	Candidate	Votes	%	±%
Conservative	Mary Elizabeth Rawlings *	1,155	60.9	
Liberal	Rob Greig	544	28.7	
Labour	T. Smithin	197	10.4	
Majority		611	32.2	
Turnout			38.3	
Registered electors		4,950		
Conservative hold		Swing		

=== Bloomfield ===
Bloomfield
Party	Candidate	Votes	%	±%
Labour	Samuel Leslie Jane *	1,082	63.2	
Conservative	J. Jones	630	36.8	
Majority		452	26.4	
Turnout			42.1	
Registered electors		4,062		
Labour hold		Swing		

=== Combe Down ===
Combe Down
Party	Candidate	Votes	%	±%
Conservative	J. Attwood *	1,024	70.6	
Labour	A. Whitehouse	426	29.4	
Majority		598	41.2	
Turnout			34.8	
Registered electors		4,169		
Conservative hold		Swing		

=== Kingsmead ===
Kingsmead
Party	Candidate	Votes	%	±%
Conservative	George Durant Kersley *	914	52.2	
Labour	J. Hornblower	551	31.5	
Liberal	Adrian Pegg	171	9.8	
Ecology	D. Taylor	114	6.5	
Majority		363	20.7	
Turnout			43.3	
Registered electors		4,042		
Conservative hold		Swing		

=== Lambridge ===
Lambridge
Party	Candidate	Votes	%	±%
Conservative	Anthony John Rhymes *	779	47.6	
Labour	D. Pearce	458	28.0	
Liberal	A. Kerslake	398	24.3	
Majority		321	19.6	
Turnout			52.9	
Registered electors		3,089		
Conservative hold		Swing		

=== Lansdown ===
Lansdown
Party	Candidate	Votes	%	±%
Conservative	M. Cheek *	936	54.3	
Liberal	P. Davis	402	23.3	
Labour	D. Holley	257	14.9	
Ecology	A. Gimingham	130	7.5	
Majority		534	31.0	
Turnout			44.1	
Registered electors		3,908		
Conservative hold		Swing		

=== Lyncombe ===
Lyncombe (2 seats)
Party	Candidate	Votes	%	±%
Conservative	C. Sellick	1,213	54.7	
Conservative	George Henry Hall	1,140	–	
Ecology	Don Grimes	580	26.2	
Labour	P. Underdown	423	19.1	
Labour	S. King	303	–	
Turnout			49.2	
Registered electors		4,501		
Conservative hold		Swing		
Conservative hold		Swing		

=== Newbridge ===
Newbridge
Party	Candidate	Votes	%	±%
Conservative	Edwina Harding Bradley *	991	55.9	
Liberal	L. Corner	496	28.0	
Labour	C. Whitmarsh	286	16.1	
Majority		495	27.9	
Turnout			44.2	
Registered electors		4,009		
Conservative hold		Swing		

=== Oldfield ===
Oldfield
Party	Candidate	Votes	%	±%
Labour	Pamela Richards	979	62.2	
Conservative	H. Jennings	429	27.3	
Liberal	S. Jones	166	10.5	
Majority		550	34.9	
Turnout			37.1	
Registered electors		4,245		
Labour hold		Swing		

=== Southdown ===
Southdown
Party	Candidate	Votes	%	±%
Labour	R. Padfield *	794	56.4	
Conservative	E. Holloway	388	27.6	
Liberal	B. Potter	226	16.1	
Majority		406	28.8	
Turnout			40.7	
Registered electors		3,458		
Labour hold		Swing		

=== Twerton ===
Twerton
Party	Candidate	Votes	%	±%
Labour	Raymond Charles Rosewarn *	1,585	86.6	
Conservative	T. Simpson	246	13.4	
Majority		1,339	73.2	
Turnout			46.1	
Registered electors		3,972		
Labour hold		Swing		

=== Walcot ===
Walcot
Party	Candidate	Votes	%	±%
Conservative	John Humphrey Lyons *	623	46.9	
Labour	S. Sweeney	409	30.8	
Liberal	R. Wardle	187	14.1	
Ecology	R. Oldfield	110	8.3	
Majority		214	16.1	
Turnout			35.1	
Registered electors		3,790		
Conservative hold		Swing		

=== Westmoreland ===
Westmoreland
Party	Candidate	Votes	%	±%
Labour	Leslie Albert William Ridd *	1,203	75.6	
Conservative	T. Maginsky	389	24.4	
Majority		814	51.2	
Turnout			38.8	
Registered electors		4,101		
Labour hold		Swing		

=== Weston ===
Weston
Party	Candidate	Votes	%	±%
Conservative	T. Vaughan *	961	45.6	
Liberal	Leon Pitt	754	35.8	
Labour	J. Waters	391	18.6	
Majority		207	9.8	
Turnout			49.7	
Registered electors		4,239		
Conservative hold		Swing		

=== Widcombe ===
Widcombe (2 seats)
Party	Candidate	Votes	%	±%
Conservative	Jeannette Farley Hole *	792	49.7	
Conservative	S. Dunn	753	–	
Labour	D. Book	385	24.2	
Labour	P. Grogan	324	–	
Ecology	R. Carder	239	15.0	
Liberal	D. England	177	11.1	
Liberal	Kenneth Drain	157	–	
Turnout			35.8	
Registered electors		3,946		
Conservative hold		Swing		
Conservative hold		Swing		
