= 1976 Bath City Council election =

1976 UK local government election

- 6 May 1976

All 48 seats to Bath City Council 25 seats needed for a majority
	First party	Second party	Third party
	Con	Lab	Lib
Party	Conservative	Labour	Liberal
Last election	19 seats, 31.1%	17 seats, 33.5%	9 seats, 33.3%
Seats won	35	13	0
Seat change	▲16	▼4	▼9
Popular vote	42,100	23,201	10,079
Percentage	55.4%	30.5%	13.3%
Swing	▲24.3%	▼3.0%	▼20.0%
- Map showing the results of the 1976 Bath City Council elections. Blue showing Conservative and Red showing Labour.
Council control before election
No overall control
Council control after election
Conservative

The 1976 Bath City Council election was held on Thursday 6 May 1976 to elect councillors to Bath City Council in England. It took place on the same day as other district council elections in the United Kingdom. The entire council was up for election. Following boundary changes the number of wards was increased by one, and the number of seats increased from 45 to 48. This was the second election to the district council, the election saw terms of councillors extended from three to four years. Subsequent elections for the council would be elected by thirds following the passing a resolution under section 7 (4) (b) of the Local Government Act 1972.

The 1976 election saw the Conservatives take majority control of the City Council.

== Election results ==
Bath City Council election, 1976
Party	Candidates						Votes		
Party	Stood	Elected	Gained	Unseated	Net	% of total	%	No.	Net %
Conservative	40	35	–	–	▲16	72.9	55.4	42,100	▲24.3%
Labour	42	13	–	–	▼4	27.1	30.5	23,201	▼3%
Liberal	18	0	–	–	▼9	0.0	13.3	10,079	▼20%
Independent	1	0	–	–	Steady	0.0	0.8	583	N/A

== Ward results ==
Sitting councillors seeking re-election, elected in 1973, are marked with an asterisk (*). The ward results listed below are based on the changes from the 1973 elections where boundary changes have not taken place, not taking into account any party defections or by-elections.

=== Abbey ===
Abbey (3 seats)
Party	Candidate	Votes	%	±%
Conservative	Laurence John Harris Coombs *	1,067	74.7	+26.0
Conservative	Elgar Spencer Jenkins *	1,059	–	
Conservative	Jeffrey William Higgins *	1,006	–	
Labour	A. Keighley	362	25.3	N/A
Labour	T. Doe	360	–	
Turnout			39.4	–5.0
Registered electors		3,866		
Conservative hold		Swing		
Conservative hold		Swing		
Conservative hold		Swing		

=== Bathwick ===
Bathwick (3 seats)
Party	Candidate	Votes	%	±%
Conservative	Mary Elizabeth Rawlings *	1,652	84.3	N/A
Conservative	Kenneth John Holloway *	1,495	–	
Conservative	P. Gees *	1,460	–	
Labour	W. Carlin	308	15.7	N/A
Labour	R. Scotford	294	–	
Labour	M. Roberts	282	–	
Turnout			51.1	N/A
Registered electors		3,886		
Conservative hold				
Conservative hold				
Conservative hold				

=== Bloomfield ===
Bloomfield (3 seats)
Party	Candidate	Votes	%	±%
Labour	Samuel Leslie Jane *	1,094	52.5	–6.9
Conservative	Eric Jack Trevor Snook	988	47.5	+6.9
Conservative	J. Dawson	922	–	
Labour	D. Holley	909	–	
Conservative	P. Moore	901	–	
Labour	M. Scotford	871	–	
Turnout			51.2	+11.6
Registered electors		4,062		
Labour hold		Swing		
Conservative gain from Labour		Swing		
Conservative gain from Labour		Swing		

=== Combe Down ===
Combe Down (3 seats)
Party	Candidate	Votes	%	±%
Conservative	J. Attwood *	1,420	71.7	+19.7
Conservative	Ian Charles Dewey *	1,398	–	
Conservative	W. Podger *	1,341	–	
Labour	C. Dore	560	28.3	N/A
Labour	M. Dunford	519	–	
Turnout			50.1	+3.0
Registered electors		4,159		
Conservative hold		Swing		
Conservative hold		Swing		
Conservative hold		Swing		

=== Kingsmead ===
Kingsmead (3 seats)
Party	Candidate	Votes	%	±%
Conservative	George Durant Kersley *	1,145	58.0	+9.8
Conservative	R. Atkinson	1,083	–	
Conservative	P. Scott	953	–	
Labour	Hilary Fraser *	830	42.0	–9.8
Labour	R. Morgan	650	–	
Labour	I. Jefferies	605	–	
Turnout			50.4	+7.3
Registered electors		3,870		
Conservative hold		Swing		
Conservative gain from Labour		Swing		
Conservative gain from Labour		Swing		

=== Lambridge ===
Lambridge (3 seats)
Party	Candidate	Votes	%	±%
Conservative	Anthony John Rhymes *	1,104	54.0	+8.9
Conservative	H. Underhay *	862	–	
Conservative	G. Mower *	822	–	
Liberal	A. Hanham	486	23.8	–7.2
Labour	R. Cambourne	456	22.3	–1.6
Labour	R. Vine	315	–	
Labour	G. Hobson	306	–	
Liberal	J. Longley	181	–	
Liberal	Kenneth Drain	164	–	
Turnout			58.8	+1.0
Registered electors		2,869		
Conservative hold		Swing		
Conservative hold		Swing		
Conservative gain from Liberal		Swing		

=== Lansdown ===
Lansdown (3 seats)
Party	Candidate	Votes	%	±%
Conservative	M. Cheek *	1,089	49.9	+10.8
Conservative	Anne Maureen McDonagh	1,080	–	
Conservative	P. Buckley	1,031	–	
Liberal	Marianna Clark *	852	39.0	–21.9
Liberal	Walter Gower Huggett *	846	–	
Liberal	R. Berry	682	–	
Labour	J. Whitehead	242	11.1	N/A
Labour	A. Day	237	–	
Turnout			59.5	+12.9
Registered electors		3,569		
Conservative gain from Liberal		Swing		
Conservative gain from Liberal		Swing		
Conservative gain from Liberal		Swing		

=== Lyncombe ===
Lyncombe (3 seats)
Party	Candidate	Votes	%	±%
Conservative	Thomas John Cornish *	1,584	80.3	N/A
Conservative	Brian James Hamlen *	1,547	–	
Conservative	H. Crallan *	1,542	–	
Labour	S. Reed	388	19.7	N/A
Labour	B. Lock	368	–	
Turnout			47.5	N/A
Registered electors		4,328		
Conservative hold				
Conservative hold				
Conservative hold				

=== Newbridge ===
Newbridge (3 seats)
Party	Candidate	Votes	%	±%
Conservative	Edwina Harding Bradley	1,152	42.0	–1.1
Conservative	Robin Nicholas Lane Agg-Manning	869	–	
Conservative	L. Rittner	817	–	
Liberal	Peter Downey *	756	27.6	–29.3
Liberal	L. Corner *	628	–	
Independent	P. Fussell	583	21.3	N/A
Liberal	D. Lincoln *	466	–	
Labour	M. Petri	252	9.2	N/A
Labour	A. Davis	244	–	
Turnout			54.0	+9.3
Registered electors		3,944		
Conservative gain from Liberal		Swing		
Conservative gain from Liberal		Swing		
Conservative gain from Liberal		Swing		

=== Oldfield ===
Oldfield (3 seats)
Party	Candidate	Votes	%	±%
Labour	L. Ashman *	1,076	65.4	+1.1
Labour	Roy Gordon Hiscocks *	1,065	–	
Labour	F. Gilbert *	1,004	–	
Conservative	M. Beckett	570	34.6	N/A
Conservative	J. Cruickshank	559	–	
Conservative	A. Campbell-Macinnes	549	–	
Turnout			44.1	+5.2
Registered electors		4,140		
Labour hold		Swing		
Labour hold		Swing		
Labour hold		Swing		

=== Southdown ===
Southdown (3 seats)
Party	Candidate	Votes	%	±%
Labour	R. Padfield *	unopposed	N/A	N/A
Labour	William Percy Johns *	unopposed	N/A	N/A
Labour	F. Hobbs *	unopposed	N/A	N/A
Registered electors		3,339		
Labour win (new seat)				
Labour win (new seat)				
Labour win (new seat)				

=== Twerton ===
Twerton (3 seats)
Party	Candidate	Votes	%	±%
Labour	Raymond Charles Rosewarn *	1,190	70.3	N/A
Labour	Alec Louis Ricketts *	905	–	
Labour	J. Halpin	828	–	
Liberal	B. Potter	503	29.7	N/A
Liberal	R. Ferris	498	–	
Liberal	P. Webster	437	–	
Turnout			46.8	
Registered electors		3,851		
Labour win (new seat)				
Labour win (new seat)				
Labour win (new seat)				

=== Walcot ===
Walcot (3 seats)
Party	Candidate	Votes	%	±%
Conservative	John Humphrey Lyons *	930	48.5	+9.9
Conservative	R. Hall	672	–	
Conservative	G. Organ	666	–	
Liberal	G. Plumbridge *	623	32.5	–3.1
Liberal	D. Lush	425	–	
Liberal	G. Whiteley	409	–	
Labour	B. Smith	364	19.0	–6.8
Labour	D. Halpin	361	–	
Turnout			42.8	–5.4
Registered electors		3,858		
Conservative hold		Swing		
Conservative hold		Swing		
Conservative gain from Liberal		Swing		

=== Westmoreland ===
Westmoreland (3 seats)
Party	Candidate	Votes	%	±%
Labour	Leslie Albert William Ridd *	1,059	60.5	N/A
Labour	M. Baber	1,016	–	
Labour	Denis Reginald Lovelace *	999	–	
Conservative	J. Jones	692	39.5	N/A
Turnout			42.4	N/A
Registered electors		4,114		
Labour hold				
Labour hold				
Labour hold				

=== Weston ===
Weston (3 seats)
Party	Candidate	Votes	%	±%
Conservative	T. Vaughan *	939	42.3	N/A
Conservative	George Henry Hall	934	–	
Conservative	C. Stebbings	917	–	
Liberal	Brian Randall Pamplin	788	35.5	N/A
Liberal	J. Coates	711	–	
Liberal	Adrian Pegg	624	–	
Labour	C. Rolfe	492	22.2	
Labour	D. Turner	483	–	
Labour	G. Whitty	454	–	
Turnout			55.6	N/A
Registered electors		4,008		
Conservative win (new seat)				
Conservative win (new seat)				
Conservative win (new seat)				

=== Widcombe ===
Widcombe (3 seats)
Party	Candidate	Votes	%	±%
Conservative	Jeannette Farley Hole *	1,141	69.7	N/A
Conservative	H. Cross	1,088	–	
Conservative	D. Elliott *	1,064	–	
Labour	C. Morgan	495	30.3	N/A
Labour	P. Mason	494	–	
Labour	J. Quin	464	–	
Turnout			44.4	N/A
Registered electors		3,919		
Conservative hold				
Conservative hold				
Conservative gain from Liberal				
